= List of Phytomyza species =

This is a list of species in the genus Phytomyza.

- Phytomyza abditus Hering, 1927
- Phytomyza abdominalis Zetterstedt, 1848
- Phytomyza abeliae Sasakawa, 1961
- Phytomyza abiskensis Spencer, 1976
- Phytomyza acanthopanicis Sasakawa, 1961
- Phytomyza achilleae Hering, 1932
- Phytomyza achilleaececis Süss, 1984
- Phytomyza achilleanella (Tschirnhaus, 1981)
- Phytomyza aconitella Hendel, 1934
- Phytomyza aconiti Hendel, 1920
- Phytomyza aconitophila Hendel, 1924
- Phytomyza actaeae Hendel, 1922
- Phytomyza actinidiae (Sasakawa, 1998)
- Phytomyza acuminata Strobl, 1909
- Phytomyza acutiventris (Zlobin, 1993)
- Phytomyza additionalis Papp, 2019
- Phytomyza adenostylis Hering, 1926
- Phytomyza adjuncta Hering, 1928
- Phytomyza aenescens (Zetterstedt, 1855)
- Phytomyza aesculi Eiseman & Lonsdale, 2018
- Phytomyza affinalis Frost, 1924
- Phytomyza affinis Fallén, 1823
- Phytomyza africana Spencer, 1959
- Phytomyza agnata Papp, 2019
- Phytomyza agromyzina Meigen, 1830
- Phytomyza aizoon Hering, 1932
- Phytomyza akebiae (Sasakawa, 1954)
- Phytomyza alamedensis Spencer, 1981
- Phytomyza alaskana Griffiths, 1974
- Phytomyza albiceps Meigen, 1830
- Phytomyza albifrons Groschke, 1957
- Phytomyza albimargo Hering, 1925
- Phytomyza albipennis Fallén, 1823
- Phytomyza aldrichi Spencer, 1986
- Phytomyza alopecuri (Griffiths, 1980)
- Phytomyza alpestris Hendel, 1920
- Phytomyza alpigenae Hendel, 1925
- Phytomyza alpina Groschke, 1957
- Phytomyza alysi Nowakowski, 1975
- Phytomyza alysicarpi Singh & Ipe, 1968
- Phytomyza ambigua
- Phytomyza analis (Rondani, 1875)
- Phytomyza ancholiae Goureau, 1851
- Phytomyza anderi (Rydén, 1952)
- Phytomyza anemonantheae Spencer, 1969
- Phytomyza anemonephila Zlobin, 2005
- Phytomyza anemones Hering, 1925
- Phytomyza anemonivora Spencer, 1969
- Phytomyza angelicae Kaltenbach, 1874
- Phytomyza angelicastri Hering, 1932
- Phytomyza angelicivora Hering, 1924
- Phytomyza angulata (Zlobin, 1993)
- Phytomyza anonera Séguy, 1951
- Phytomyza anserimontis Griffiths, 1976
- Phytomyza antennariae Bland, 2011
- Phytomyza antennata Spencer, 1960
- Phytomyza anthocercidis Spencer, 1977
- Phytomyza anthyllidis Hering, 1954
- Phytomyza aphyllae Beiger, 1964
- Phytomyza aposeridis Groschke, 1957
- Phytomyza aprilina Goureau
- Phytomyza aquilegiae Hardy, 1849
- Phytomyza aquilegiana Frost, 1930
- Phytomyza aquilegioides Sehgal, 1971
- Phytomyza aquilegiophaga Spencer, 1969
- Phytomyza aquilegivora Spencer, 1969
- Phytomyza aquilonia Frey, 1946
- Phytomyza araciocecis Hering, 1958
- Phytomyza araciocesis Hering, 1958
- Phytomyza aragonensis Griffiths, 1967
- Phytomyza araliae Sasakawa, 1955
- Phytomyza aralivora Spencer, 1969
- Phytomyza archangelicae Hering, 1937
- Phytomyza arctagrostidis (Griffiths, 1980)
- Phytomyza arcticola (Spencer, 1969)
- Phytomyza argentata Papp, 2019
- Phytomyza aristata Hendel, 1934
- Phytomyza arnaudi Sasakawa, 1955
- Phytomyza arnicae Hering, 1925
- Phytomyza arnicicola Lundqvist, 1949
- Phytomyza arnicivora Sehgal, 1971
- Phytomyza aronici Nowakowski, 1962
- Phytomyza artemisivora Spencer, 1971
- Phytomyza asparagi (Hering, 1942)
- Phytomyza asparagivora (Spencer, 1964)
- Phytomyza asteris Hendel, 1934
- Phytomyza asterophaga Spencer, 1969
- Phytomyza astotinensis Griffiths, 1976
- Phytomyza astrantiae Hendel, 1924
- Phytomyza athamantae Hering, 1943
- Phytomyza atomaria Zetterstedt, 1848
- Phytomyza atricornis (Meigen, 1838)
- Phytomyza atripalpis Aldrich, 1929
- Phytomyza aulagromyzina Pakalniškis, 1994
- Phytomyza aurata Griffiths, 1974
- Phytomyza aurei Hering, 1931
- Phytomyza auricornis Frost, 1927
- Phytomyza avicursa Lonsdale, 2021
- Phytomyza banffensis Spencer, 1969
- Phytomyza beigerae (Griffiths, 1980)
- Phytomyza bellidina Hendel, 1934
- Phytomyza bellidis (Griffiths, 1967)
- Phytomyza beringiana Griffiths, 1975
- Phytomyza bicolor (Meigen, 1838)
- Phytomyza bifida Sasakawa, 1961
- Phytomyza bipunctata Loew, 1858
- Phytomyza biseta Hering, 1954
- Phytomyza blackstoniae (Spencer, 1990)
- Phytomyza boulderella Spencer, 1986
- Phytomyza brevicornis Hendel, 1934
- Phytomyza brevifacies Hendel, 1934
- Phytomyza brevifascies Hendel, 1934
- Phytomyza breviseta (Zetterstedt, 1860)
- Phytomyza brevituba Sasakawa, 1998
- Phytomyza brischkei Hendel, 1922
- Phytomyza brunnea Brischke, 1881
- Phytomyza brunnipes Brischke, 1881
- Phytomyza buhri Hering, 1930
- Phytomyza buhriana Hering, 1949
- Phytomyza buhriella Spencer, 1969
- Phytomyza bukkensis Papp, 2019
- Phytomyza bulbiseta Zlobin, 1997
- Phytomyza bulgarica Černý, Barták, Kúbik & Vála, 2022
- Phytomyza burchardi Hering, 1927
- Phytomyza burmensis Zlobin, 2002
- Phytomyza caesalpiniae Blanchard, 1954
- Phytomyza caffra Macquart, 1846
- Phytomyza calceata (Meigen, 1838)
- Phytomyza californica Griffiths, 1974
- Phytomyza californiensis Winkler, 2009
- Phytomyza callianthemi Hering, 1944
- Phytomyza calthae Hering, 1924
- Phytomyza calthivora Hendel, 1934
- Phytomyza calthophila Hering, 1931
- Phytomyza cameronensis Spencer, 1982
- Phytomyza campanulae Hendel, 1920
- Phytomyza camuna Süss & Moreschi, 2005
- Phytomyza cana Rydén, 1954
- Phytomyza canadensis Spencer, 1969
- Phytomyza caprifoliae Spencer, 1969
- Phytomyza carbonensis Spencer, 1981
- Phytomyza carlestolrai Černý, 2007
- Phytomyza carotae (Spencer, 1966)
- Phytomyza carpesicola Sasakawa, 1955
- Phytomyza castillejae Spencer, 1973
- Phytomyza catalaunica Spencer, 1960
- Phytomyza catenula Lonsdale, 2021
- Phytomyza caulinaris Hering, 1949
- Phytomyza ceanothi Spencer, 1986
- Phytomyza cearothi Spencer, 1986
- Phytomyza cecidonomia Hering, 1937
- Phytomyza centaurii (Spencer, 1990)
- Phytomyza centralis Frost, 1936
- Phytomyza cepelaki (Černý, 2012)
- Phytomyza ceylonensis Spencer, 1975
- Phytomyza chaerophylli Kaltenbach, 1856
- Phytomyza chaerophylliana Hering, 1931
- Phytomyza chamaemetabola (Griffiths, 1974)
- Phytomyza cheilanthus Garg, 1971
- Phytomyza chelonei Spencer, 1969
- Phytomyza chrysocera Hendel, 1935
- Phytomyza cichorii (Spencer, 1966)
- Phytomyza cicutae Hendel, 1922
- Phytomyza cicutella Spencer, 1981
- Phytomyza cicutivora Hering, 1932
- Phytomyza ciliata Hendel, 1935
- Phytomyza ciliolati Spencer, 1969
- Phytomyza cinerea Hendel, 1920
- Phytomyza cinnae (Griffiths, 1980)
- Phytomyza cirrhosae Spencer, 1969
- Phytomyza cirsii Hendel, 1923
- Phytomyza cirsiophaga Hendel, 1935
- Phytomyza clematadi Watt, 1923
- Phytomyza clematicaulis Hering, 1958
- Phytomyza clematidella Spencer, 1959
- Phytomyza clematidicaulis Hering, 1958
- Phytomyza clematidophoeta Spencer, 1969
- Phytomyza clematiphaga Spencer, 1969
- Phytomyza clematisana Spencer, 1981
- Phytomyza clematisella Spencer, 1986
- Phytomyza clematisi Spencer, 1964
- Phytomyza clemativora Coquillett, 1910
- Phytomyza clematoides Spencer, 1986
- Phytomyza cnidii Griffiths, 1973
- Phytomyza coloradella Spencer, 1986
- Phytomyza columbiana Griffiths, 1977
- Phytomyza columbinae Sehgal, 1971
- Phytomyza compta (Spencer, 1986)
- Phytomyza confinis Meigen, 1838
- Phytomyza confusa Eiseman & Lonsdale, 2018
- Phytomyza conglomerata Boucher & Wheeler, 2001
- Phytomyza conii Hering, 1932
- Phytomyza coniopais Hering, 1931
- Phytomyza conioselini Griffiths, 1973
- Phytomyza conjuncta Iwasaki, 1996
- Phytomyza continua Hendel, 1920
- Phytomyza conyzae Hendel, 1920
- Phytomyza coquilletti Spencer, 1986
- Phytomyza corni Kaltenbach, 1859
- Phytomyza cornuta Hendel, 1935
- Phytomyza cortusifolii Spencer, 1965
- Phytomyza corvimontana Hering, 1930
- Phytomyza crassiseta Zetterstedt, 1860
- Phytomyza crawfurdiae (Sasakawa, 1954)
- Phytomyza crepidis Spencer, 1981
- Phytomyza curvipes (Zlobin, 1993)
- Phytomyza cygnicollina (Griffiths, 1980)
- Phytomyza cytisi Brischke, 1881
- Phytomyza dalmatiensis (Spencer, 1961)
- Phytomyza dasyops Hendel, 1920
- Phytomyza davisii (Walton, 1912)
- Phytomyza deflecta Hendel, 1920
- Phytomyza deirdreae Griffiths, 1972
- Phytomyza delphinivora Spencer, 1969
- Phytomyza demissa Spencer, 1969
- Phytomyza despinosa Griffiths, 1976
- Phytomyza deutziae Sasakawa, 1957
- Phytomyza digitalis Hering, 1925
- Phytomyza dioni Boucher & Wheeler, 2001
- Phytomyza disjuncta Sasakawa, 1961
- Phytomyza disjunctivena Gu, 1991
- Phytomyza distantia Sasakawa, 2007
- Phytomyza distantinervis (Strobl, 1909)
- Phytomyza ditmani Kulp, 1968
- Phytomyza diversicornis Hendel, 1927
- Phytomyza doellingeriae Eiseman & Lonsdale, 2018
- Phytomyza doolittlei (Spencer, 1986)
- Phytomyza doronici Hendel, 1923
- Phytomyza dorsata Hendel, 1920
- Phytomyza dreisbachi Steyskal, 1972
- Phytomyza dryas Hering, 1937
- Phytomyza dryoptericola Sasakawa, 1961
- Phytomyza dubia (Zlobin, 1994)
- Phytomyza duplex Spencer, 1986
- Phytomyza echo Winkler, 1986
- Phytomyza edmontonensis Sehgal, 1971
- Phytomyza elgonensis (Spencer, 1985)
- Phytomyza elsae Hendel, 1927
- Phytomyza enigma Malloch, 1934
- Phytomyza enigmatosa Zlobin, 1994
- Phytomyza epistomella Hendel, 1935
- Phytomyza erigeronis Eiseman & Lonsdale, 2018
- Phytomyza erigerontophaga Spencer, 1969
- Phytomyza erigerophila Hering, 1927
- Phytomyza eriodictyi (Spencer, 1981)
- Phytomyza esakii Sasakawa, 1955
- Phytomyza eumorpha Frey, 1946
- Phytomyza eupatorii Hendel, 1927
- Phytomyza euphrasiae Kaltenbach, 1860
- Phytomyza evanescens Hendel, 1920
- Phytomyza evansi Spencer, 1986
- Phytomyza exilis Hering, 1937
- Phytomyza facialis Kaltenbach, 1872
- Phytomyza fallaciosa Brischke, 1881
- Phytomyza farfarae Hendel, 1935
- Phytomyza farfarella Hendel, 1935
- Phytomyza fasciata Macquart, 1835
- Phytomyza fasciata Meigen, 1830
- Phytomyza felix Spencer, 1981
- Phytomyza fennoscandiae Spencer, 1976
- Phytomyza ferina Spencer, 1971
- Phytomyza ferruginea Hendel, 1935
- Phytomyza ferulae Hering, 1927
- Phytomyza ferulivora Griffiths, 1956
- Phytomyza filiformis Papp, 2019
- Phytomyza filipenduliphila (Zlobin, 1994)
- Phytomyza fimbriata Sasakawa, 1955
- Phytomyza flavens Spencer, 1986
- Phytomyza flaviantennalis Spencer, 1981
- Phytomyza flaviceps Macquart, 1835
- Phytomyza flavicornis Fallén, 1823
- Phytomyza flavida (Spencer, 1986)
- Phytomyza flavifacies Hendel, 1935
- Phytomyza flavifascies Hendel, 1935
- Phytomyza flavilabris Macquart, 1835
- Phytomyza flavilonicera Eiseman & Lonsdale, 2021
- Phytomyza flavimanus (Zetterstedt, 1860)
- Phytomyza flavinervis Frost, 1924
- Phytomyza flaviventris Zetterstedt, 1848
- Phytomyza flavivertex (Zlobin, 1993)
- Phytomyza flavofemoralis Sasakawa, 1955
- Phytomyza flavofemorata Strobl, 1893
- Phytomyza flavohumeralis (Zlobin, 1993)
- Phytomyza flexuosa Spencer, 1986
- Phytomyza formosae Spencer, 1966
- Phytomyza franzi Hering, 1944
- Phytomyza fricki (Griffiths, 1974)
- Phytomyza frontalis (Meigen, 1830)
- Phytomyza fulgens Hendel, 1920
- Phytomyza fulvovittata Strobl, 1910
- Phytomyza fumariacea Garg, 1971
- Phytomyza furcata (Griffiths, 1980)
- Phytomyza fuscipes (Macquart, 1835)
- Phytomyza fuscula Zetterstedt, 1838
- Phytomyza gei (Brischke, 1881)
- Phytomyza gelida Spencer, 1969
- Phytomyza geminata Sasakawa, 2008
- Phytomyza genalis Melander, 1913
- Phytomyza geniculata Brullé, 1833
- Phytomyza geniculata Macquart, 1835
- Phytomyza gentianae Hendel, 1920
- Phytomyza gentianella Hendel, 1932
- Phytomyza gentii (Hendel, 1920)
- Phytomyza genualis (Zlobin, 1994)
- Phytomyza gilva Spencer, 1971
- Phytomyza glabricola Kulp, 1968
- Phytomyza glacialis Griffiths, 1964
- Phytomyza glechomae Kaltenbach, 1862
- Phytomyza globulariae Hendel, 1935
- Phytomyza gracilis (Meigen, 1830)
- Phytomyza grandella (Spencer, 1986)
- Phytomyza gregaria Frick, 1954
- Phytomyza griffithsella Winkler, 2009
- Phytomyza griffithsi Spencer, 1963
- Phytomyza griffithsiana Beiger, 1977
- Phytomyza grisescens Hendel, 1920
- Phytomyza gymnostoma Loew, 1858
- Phytomyza haemorrhoidalis (Zetterstedt, 1848)
- Phytomyza hasegawai Sasakawa, 1981
- Phytomyza hatfieldae Eiseman & Lonsdale, 2018
- Phytomyza hebronensis Spencer, 1969
- Phytomyza hecate (Pakalniškis, 1998)
- Phytomyza heckfordi Bland, 2011
- Phytomyza hedingi Rydén, 1953
- Phytomyza helianthi Sasakawa, 1955
- Phytomyza hellebori Kaltenbach, 1872
- Phytomyza helosciadii Kaltenbach, 1862
- Phytomyza hendeli Hering, 1923
- Phytomyza heracleana Hering, 1937
- Phytomyza heraclei (Bouché, 1847)
- Phytomyza heringiana Hendel, 1922
- Phytomyza heterophylli Bland, 1997
- Phytomyza hiemalis Griffiths, 1974
- Phytomyza himachali Singh & Garg, 1970
- Phytomyza hirsuta Spencer, 1976
- Phytomyza hirta Rydén, 1957
- Phytomyza holosericea (Bouché, 1847)
- Phytomyza homogyneae Hendel, 1927
- Phytomyza hoppi Hering, 1925
- Phytomyza hoppiella (Spencer, 1990)
- Phytomyza horticola Goureau, 1851
- Phytomyza humeralis (Zlobin, 1993)
- Phytomyza humilis Spencer, 1969
- Phytomyza hyalipennis (Meigen, 1838)
- Phytomyza hyaloposthia Sasakawa, 1986
- Phytomyza hydrangeae Sasakawa, 1956
- Phytomyza hydrophyllivora Eiseman & Lonsdale, 2018
- Phytomyza hyperborea Griffiths, 1972
- Phytomyza hypophallus Papp, 2019
- Phytomyza hypophylla Griffiths, 1972
- Phytomyza hypospinosa Papp, 2019
- Phytomyza ignota Pakalniškis, 1994
- Phytomyza ilicicola Loew, 1863
- Phytomyza ilicis Curtis, 1846
- Phytomyza immanis (Spencer, 1969)
- Phytomyza immerita (Spencer, 1969)
- Phytomyza impunita Lonsdale, 2015
- Phytomyza infelix Spencer, 1969
- Phytomyza integerrimi Griffiths, 1974
- Phytomyza inulicola Hering, 1937
- Phytomyza inusitata Sasakawa, 2004
- Phytomyza involucratae Spencer, 1969
- Phytomyza isais Hering, 1937
- Phytomyza isicae Hering, 1962
- Phytomyza ixeridopsis (Griffiths, 1977)
- Phytomyza japonica Sasakawa, 1953
- Phytomyza jasperensis Sehgal, 1971
- Phytomyza jonaitisi Pakalniškis, 1996
- Phytomyza jucunda Frost & Sasakawa, 1954
- Phytomyza jugalis Hendel, 1935
- Phytomyza kalopanacis Iwasaki, 1997
- Phytomyza kaltenbachi Hendel, 1922
- Phytomyza kamtschatkensis Hendel, 1935
- Phytomyza kandybinae (Zlobin, 1994)
- Phytomyza kareliensis Spencer, 1976
- Phytomyza karmarensis Černý, Barták, Kúbik & Vála, 2022
- Phytomyza karnarensis Černý, Barták, Kubík & Vála, 2022
- Phytomyza kasi Henshaw, 1989
- Phytomyza kerteszi (Černý, 2019)
- Phytomyza kerzhneri Winkler, 2009
- Phytomyza kibunensis Sasakawa, 1953
- Phytomyza kisakai Sasakawa, 1954
- Phytomyza klondikensis Boucher & Wheeler, 2001
- Phytomyza kluanensis (Griffiths, 1974)
- Phytomyza knowltoniae Hering, 1957
- Phytomyza krygeri Hering, 1949
- Phytomyza kugleri Spencer, 1974
- Phytomyza kumaonensis Singh & Ipe, 1968
- Phytomyza kurilensis Iwasaki, 2000
- Phytomyza kyfhusana Hering, 1928
- Phytomyza lactuca Frost, 1924
- Phytomyza lacustris (Zlobin, 1994)
- Phytomyza lanati Spencer, 1966
- Phytomyza lappae Goureau, 1851
- Phytomyza lappivora Hendel, 1927
- Phytomyza laterella (Zlobin, 1994)
- Phytomyza lateritia (Rondani, 1875)
- Phytomyza latifolii Groschke, 1957
- Phytomyza latifrons Hendel, 1935
- Phytomyza latifrons Spencer, 1986
- Phytomyza leptargyreae (Griffiths, 1976)
- Phytomyza leslieae Lonsdale & Scheffer, 2011
- Phytomyza lethe Hering, 1930
- Phytomyza leucanthemi Hering, 1935
- Phytomyza leucocephala (Meigen, 1830)
- Phytomyza libanotidis Hering, 1928
- Phytomyza ligusticifoliae Spencer, 1981
- Phytomyza lindbergi Spencer, 1957
- Phytomyza lineata Lonsdale & Scheffer, 2011
- Phytomyza linnaeae (Griffiths, 1974)
- Phytomyza lithospermi Nowakowski, 1959
- Phytomyza liturata Brullé, 1833
- Phytomyza loewii Hendel, 1923
- Phytomyza lonicerae Robineau-Desvoidy
- Phytomyza lugentis Griffiths, 1972
- Phytomyza lupini Sehgal, 1968
- Phytomyza lupinivora Sehgal, 1968
- Phytomyza lusatica Hering, 1955
- Phytomyza luteoscutellata Meijere, 1924
- Phytomyza luzulae Hering, 1924
- Phytomyza luzulivora (Spencer, 1986)
- Phytomyza lycopi Nowakowski, 1959
- Phytomyza majalis Zlobin, 1994
- Phytomyza major Malloch, 1913
- Phytomyza malaca Spencer, 1981
- Phytomyza malaisei Zlobin, 2002
- Phytomyza manni (Spencer, 1986)
- Phytomyza marginella Fallén, 1823
- Phytomyza maritima (Tschirnhaus, 1981)
- Phytomyza masoni Spencer, 1986
- Phytomyza masumiae (Sasakawa, 2010)
- Phytomyza matricariae Hendel, 1923
- Phytomyza medicaginis Hering, 1925
- Phytomyza melana Hendel, 1920
- Phytomyza melanella Frost, 1924
- Phytomyza melanogaster Thomson, 1869
- Phytomyza melanosoma Hendel, 1920
- Phytomyza melanostoma Hendel, 1920
- Phytomyza meridensis Spencer, 1973
- Phytomyza meridialis Spencer, 1982
- Phytomyza meridionalis Spencer, 1972
- Phytomyza merita (Zlobin, 1993)
- Phytomyza mertensiae Sehgal, 1971
- Phytomyza merula Spencer, 1969
- Phytomyza milii Kaltenbach, 1864
- Phytomyza mimula (Spencer, 1969)
- Phytomyza mimuli (Spencer, 1969)
- Phytomyza minima Meigen, 1830
- Phytomyza minimoides Winkler, 2009
- Phytomyza minuens Hendel, 1935
- Phytomyza minuta (Meigen, 1838)
- Phytomyza minuta (Spencer, 1981)
- Phytomyza minutissima Spencer, 1981
- Phytomyza miranda Spencer, 1969
- Phytomyza misella Spencer, 1969
- Phytomyza mitchelli (Spencer, 1986)
- Phytomyza mitellae Griffiths, 1972
- Phytomyza modica Spencer, 1969
- Phytomyza modocensis Spencer, 1981
- Phytomyza monori Groschke, 1957
- Phytomyza montana Groschke, 1957
- Phytomyza montanoides (Spencer, 1981)
- Phytomyza montella (Spencer, 1986)
- Phytomyza montereyensis Spencer, 1981
- Phytomyza monticola Černý, 2007
- Phytomyza multifidae Sehgal, 1971
- Phytomyza multifidi Spencer, 1985
- Phytomyza murina Hendel, 1935
- Phytomyza mutellinae Beiger, 1961
- Phytomyza mylini Hering, 1957
- Phytomyza myosotica Nowakowski, 1959
- Phytomyza nagvakensis Spencer, 1969
- Phytomyza nana Winkler, 2009
- Phytomyza narcissiflorae Hering, 1928
- Phytomyza natalensis Spencer, 1964
- Phytomyza neglecta (Zlobin, 1994)
- Phytomyza nemopanthi Griffiths & Piercey-Normore, 1995
- Phytomyza nemophilae Eiseman & Lonsdale, 2019
- Phytomyza nepalensis Spencer, 1965
- Phytomyza nepetae Hendel, 1922
- Phytomyza nervi Hering, 1956
- Phytomyza nervosa Loew, 1869
- Phytomyza nigella Zlobin, 1997
- Phytomyza nigra (Meigen, 1830)
- Phytomyza nigrella Hendel, 1935
- Phytomyza nigricans Macquart, 1835
- Phytomyza nigriceps (Wulp, 1871)
- Phytomyza nigricornis Kaltenbach, 1856
- Phytomyza nigricornis Macquart, 1835
- Phytomyza nigricoxa Hendel, 1935
- Phytomyza nigrifemur Hering, 1934
- Phytomyza nigrilineata (Griffiths, 1974)
- Phytomyza nigrinervis Frost, 1924
- Phytomyza nigripennis Fallén, 1823
- Phytomyza nigrissima (Spencer, 1985)
- Phytomyza nigrita Spencer, 1960
- Phytomyza nigritella Zetterstedt, 1848
- Phytomyza nigrociliata Sasakawa, 1961
- Phytomyza nigroclypea Hendel, 1935
- Phytomyza nigroorbitalis Rydén, 1956
- Phytomyza nilgiriensis Ipe, 1971
- Phytomyza nishijimai Sasakawa, 1955
- Phytomyza nitidicollis Meigen, 1838
- Phytomyza nordica (Spencer, 1981)
- Phytomyza norwegica Rydén, 1957
- Phytomyza notata Meigen, 1830
- Phytomyza notopleuralis Spencer, 1969
- Phytomyza novitzkyi Hering, 1958
- Phytomyza nowakowskiana Beiger, 1975
- Phytomyza nugax (Spencer, 1969)
- Phytomyza obscura Hendel, 1920
- Phytomyza obscurata Hendel, 1920
- Phytomyza obscurella Fallén, 1823
- Phytomyza obscuriceps Hendel, 1935
- Phytomyza obscuripennis (Macquart, 1835)
- Phytomyza obscuritarsis (Rondani, 1875)
- Phytomyza ochracea Hendel, 1920
- Phytomyza oenanthes Sasakawa, 1955
- Phytomyza oenanthica Hering, 1949
- Phytomyza oenanthoides Spencer, 1981
- Phytomyza oligochaeta Papp, 2019
- Phytomyza omlandi Scheffer & Lonsdale, 2011
- Phytomyza omphalivora (Sasakawa, 1993)
- Phytomyza opaca Hendel, 1920
- Phytomyza opacae Kulp, 1968
- Phytomyza opacella Hendel, 1935
- Phytomyza orbitella (Spencer, 1981)
- Phytomyza oreas Griffiths, 1974
- Phytomyza oreophila Franz, 1947
- Phytomyza orientalis Spencer, 1962
- Phytomyza origani Hering, 1931
- Phytomyza orindensis Spencer, 1981
- Phytomyza orlandensis Spencer, 1973
- Phytomyza orobanchia Kaltenbach, 1864
- Phytomyza oscinina Fallén, 1823
- Phytomyza osmorhizae Spencer, 1969
- Phytomyza ovalis Griffiths, 1975
- Phytomyza ovimontis Griffiths, 1976
- Phytomyza oxytropidis Sehgal, 1971
- Phytomyza palionisi Pakalniškis, 1998
- Phytomyza pallens (Spencer, 1969)
- Phytomyza pallida (Meigen, 1838)
- Phytomyza pallipes Spencer, 1969
- Phytomyza pallitarsis (Macquart, 1835)
- Phytomyza palmeri Eiseman & Lonsdale, 2018
- Phytomyza palpata (Hendel, 1920)
- Phytomyza palustris Eiseman & Lonsdale, 2018
- Phytomyza pampeana Blanchard, 1954
- Phytomyza paniculatae Sasakawa, 1953
- Phytomyza paraciliata (Godfray, 1985)
- Phytomyza paracontinua Papp, 2019
- Phytomyza paranigrifemur Černý, 2007
- Phytomyza paratripolii (Chen & Wang, 2003)
- Phytomyza paratrolliivora Papp, 2019
- Phytomyza parva (Rondani, 1875)
- Phytomyza parvicella (Coquillett, 1902)
- Phytomyza pastinacae Hendel, 1923
- Phytomyza pauliloewi Hendel, 1920
- Phytomyza pedicularicaulis Spencer, 1969
- Phytomyza pedicularidis Spencer, 1969
- Phytomyza pedicularifolii Hering, 1960
- Phytomyza penicilla Hendel, 1935
- Phytomyza penstemonella Spencer, 1981
- Phytomyza penstemonis Spencer, 1969
- Phytomyza perangusta Sasakawa, 1972
- Phytomyza peregrini Griffiths, 1976
- Phytomyza periclymeni Hendel, 1922
- Phytomyza permutata Hering, 1962
- Phytomyza persicae Frick, 1954
- Phytomyza peteoi
- Phytomyza petiolaris Griffiths, 1975
- Phytomyza petoei Hering, 1924
- Phytomyza peucedani Ryden, 1953
- Phytomyza phaceliae Spencer, 1981
- Phytomyza phalangites Griffiths, 1976
- Phytomyza phellandrii Hering, 1956
- Phytomyza phillyreae Hering, 1930
- Phytomyza philoclematidis Hering, 1957
- Phytomyza picridocecis Hering, 1957
- Phytomyza pieninica Nowakowski, 1963
- Phytomyza pilescens Singh & Ipe, 1973
- Phytomyza pimpinellae Hendel, 1924
- Phytomyza placita Spencer, 1977
- Phytomyza plantaginis Goureau, 1851
- Phytomyza plantaginis Robineau-Desvoidy, 1851
- Phytomyza platensis Brèthes, 1923
- Phytomyza platonoffi Spencer, 1976
- Phytomyza platystoma (Hendel, 1920)
- Phytomyza plumea (Spencer, 1969)
- Phytomyza plumigera (Zlobin, 1994)
- Phytomyza plumiseta Frost, 1924
- Phytomyza poae (Griffiths, 1980)
- Phytomyza podagrariae Hering, 1957
- Phytomyza polycladae Sasakawa, 1955
- Phytomyza polysticha Hendel, 1935
- Phytomyza poppii Rydén, 1951
- Phytomyza prava Spencer, 1969
- Phytomyza prima (Zlobin, 2001)
- Phytomyza primulae Goureau, 1851
- Phytomyza pseudoangelicae Sasakawa, 2008
- Phytomyza pseudogentii Beiger, 1972
- Phytomyza pseudomilii (Griffiths, 1980)
- Phytomyza ptarmicae Hering, 1937
- Phytomyza pubescens (Zlobin, 1993)
- Phytomyza pubicornis Hendel, 1920
- Phytomyza puccinelliae Spencer, 1969
- Phytomyza pulchella Spencer, 1977
- Phytomyza pulchelloides Henshaw & Howse, 1989
- Phytomyza pulchra Hendel, 1920
- Phytomyza pullula Zetterstedt, 1848
- Phytomyza pulmonariae Nowakowski, 1959
- Phytomyza pulsatillae Hering, 1924
- Phytomyza pulsatillicola Hering, 1962
- Phytomyza pummankiensis Spencer, 1976
- Phytomyza pusilla (Forster, 1891)
- Phytomyza qinghaiensis (Gu, 1991)
- Phytomyza quadriseta Sasakawa, 1972
- Phytomyza quadrispinosa Sasakawa, 2008
- Phytomyza queribunda Spencer, 1969
- Phytomyza ranunculi (Schrank, 1803)
- Phytomyza ranunculicola Hering, 1949
- Phytomyza ranunculina Spencer, 1963
- Phytomyza ranunculiphila Zlobin, 1993
- Phytomyza ranunculivora Hering, 1932
- Phytomyza rapunculi Hendel, 1927
- Phytomyza ravasternopleuralis Sasakawa, 1955
- Phytomyza rectae Hendel, 1924
- Phytomyza redunca Sasakawa, 2006
- Phytomyza regalensis Steyskal, 1972
- Phytomyza rhabdophora Griffiths, 1964
- Phytomyza rhaetica (Griffiths, 1980)
- Phytomyza rhodiolae Griffiths, 1976
- Phytomyza rhodopaea Beiger, 1979
- Phytomyza ringdahli Rydén, 1937
- Phytomyza ripara (Wulp, 1871)
- Phytomyza riparia Sehgal, 1971
- Phytomyza robustella Hendel, 1935
- Phytomyza rostrata Hering, 1934
- Phytomyza rubicola Sasakawa, 1998
- Phytomyza rufescens Roser, 1840
- Phytomyza ruficeps (Macquart, 1835)
- Phytomyza ruficeps (Meigen, 1830)
- Phytomyza ruficeps Zlobin, 1997
- Phytomyza ruficornis (Macquart, 1835)
- Phytomyza rufifrons (Macquart, 1835)
- Phytomyza rufimanus (Macquart, 1835)
- Phytomyza rufipes Meigen, 1830
- Phytomyza rydeni Hering, 1934
- Phytomyza rydeniella Spencer, 1976
- Phytomyza salviae (Hering, 1924)
- Phytomyza salviarum Eiseman & Lonsdale, 2019
- Phytomyza saniculae Spencer, 1981
- Phytomyza saskatoonensis Spencer, 1969
- Phytomyza saxatilis Griffiths, 1974
- Phytomyza saxifragae Hering, 1924
- Phytomyza saximontana Griffiths, 1974
- Phytomyza scabiosae Hendel, 1935
- Phytomyza scabiosarum Meijere, 1934
- Phytomyza scabiosella (Beiger, 2001)
- Phytomyza scaligerae Hering, 1967
- Phytomyza scaligeriae Hering, 1967
- Phytomyza schlicki Spencer, 1976
- Phytomyza schuetzei Hering, 1955
- Phytomyza schusteri (Spencer, 1981)
- Phytomyza scolopendri Goureau, 1851
- Phytomyza scopulina Griffiths, 1976
- Phytomyza scotina Hendel, 1920
- Phytomyza scrophulariae (Spencer, 1966)
- Phytomyza sedi Kaltenbach, 1869
- Phytomyza sedicola Hering, 1924
- Phytomyza sehgali Spencer, 1969
- Phytomyza selini Hering, 1922
- Phytomyza sempervirentis Eiseman & Lonsdale, 2018
- Phytomyza senecionella Sehgal, 1971
- Phytomyza senecionis Kaltenbach, 1869
- Phytomyza seneciophila (Spencer, 1985)
- Phytomyza seneciovora Spencer, 1959
- Phytomyza seseleos Hering, 1957
- Phytomyza shepherdiana (Griffiths, 1976)
- Phytomyza sibirica Hendel, 1935
- Phytomyza sii Hering, 1930
- Phytomyza silai Hering, 1935
- Phytomyza sitchensis Griffiths, 1973
- Phytomyza skuratowiczi Beiger, 1972
- Phytomyza smyrnii Spencer, 1954
- Phytomyza socia Brischke, 1881
- Phytomyza soenderupi Hering, 1941
- Phytomyza soenderupiella Spencer, 1976
- Phytomyza soldanellae Starý, 1950
- Phytomyza solidaginis Hendel, 1920
- Phytomyza solidaginivora Spencer, 1969
- Phytomyza solidaginophaga Sehgal, 1971
- Phytomyza sonorensis Spencer, 1981
- Phytomyza sordida (Brischke, 1881)
- Phytomyza sorosi Zlobin, 1994
- Phytomyza spenceri Korytkowski, 2014
- Phytomyza spenceriana (Griffiths, 1980)
- Phytomyza sphondyliivora Spencer, 1957
- Phytomyza spinaciae Hendel, 1928
- Phytomyza splendida Spencer, 1981
- Phytomyza spoliata Strobl, 1906
- Phytomyza spondylii Goureau, 1851
- Phytomyza spondylii Robineau-Desvoidy, 1851
- Phytomyza stenoptera Papp, 2019
- Phytomyza stolonigena Hering, 1949
- Phytomyza styriaca (Griffiths, 1980)
- Phytomyza subalpina Sehgal, 1971
- Phytomyza subaquilegiana Zlobin, 1997
- Phytomyza subnigra (Spencer, 1985)
- Phytomyza subrostrata Frey, 1946
- Phytomyza subtenella Frost, 1924
- Phytomyza subtilis Spencer, 1969
- Phytomyza succisae Hering, 1922
- Phytomyza suda (Spencer, 1969)
- Phytomyza suikazurae (Sasakawa, 1993)
- Phytomyza superba Spencer, 1969
- Phytomyza suwai Iwasaki, 1996
- Phytomyza swertiae Hering, 1937
- Phytomyza symphoricarpi (Griffiths, 1974)
- Phytomyza symphyti Hendel, 1935
- Phytomyza syngenesiae (Hardy, 1849)
- Phytomyza takasagoensis Sasakawa, 1972
- Phytomyza takhiniensis Boucher & Wheeler, 2001
- Phytomyza tamui Sasakawa, 1957
- Phytomyza tanaitica (Zlobin, 1993)
- Phytomyza taraxaci Hendel, 1927
- Phytomyza tarnwoodensis Eiseman & Lonsdale, 2018
- Phytomyza tarsata (Meigen, 1838)
- Phytomyza tenella Meigen, 1830
- Phytomyza tenuifrons (Zlobin, 1993)
- Phytomyza tenuis Spencer, 1969
- Phytomyza thalictrella Spencer, 1981
- Phytomyza thalictri Escher-Kündig, 1912
- Phytomyza thalictricola Hendel, 1925
- Phytomyza thalictrivora Spencer, 1969
- Phytomyza thapsi Robineau-Desvoidy, 1851
- Phytomyza thermarum (Griffiths, 1976)
- Phytomyza thoracica (Macquart, 1835)
- Phytomyza thymi Hering, 1928
- Phytomyza thysselini Hendel, 1923
- Phytomyza thysselinivora Hering, 1924
- Phytomyza tiarellae Griffiths, 1972
- Phytomyza tibialis (Fallén, 1823)
- Phytomyza tigris Eiseman & Lonsdale, 2018
- Phytomyza timida Spencer, 1969
- Phytomyza tlingitica Griffiths, 1973
- Phytomyza tomentella Sasakawa, 1972
- Phytomyza torilisi Guglya, 2021
- Phytomyza torrentium (Griffiths, 1980)
- Phytomyza tottoriensis Kuroda, 1954
- Phytomyza triangularidis Eiseman & Lonsdale, 2018
- Phytomyza trichopsis Hendel, 1935
- Phytomyza triostevena Eiseman & Lonsdale, 2021
- Phytomyza trivittata Frost, 1924
- Phytomyza trollii Hering, 1930
- Phytomyza trolliicaulis Süss, 1989
- Phytomyza trolliivora Hering, 1935
- Phytomyza trolliophila Hering, 1949
- Phytomyza tropica Spencer, 1961
- Phytomyza tschirnhausi (Griffiths, 1980)
- Phytomyza tucumana Blanchard, 1954
- Phytomyza tundrensis Spencer, 1969
- Phytomyza tussilaginis Hendel, 1925
- Phytomyza ukogi Iwasaki, 1996
- Phytomyza umanomitsubae Sasakawa, 1993
- Phytomyza umbelliferarum Hendel, 1935
- Phytomyza uncinata Sasakawa, 1986
- Phytomyza urbana Spencer, 1969
- Phytomyza ussuriensis Winkler, 2009
- Phytomyza valida Sasakawa, 1972
- Phytomyza vancouveriella Eiseman & Lonsdale, 2018
- Phytomyza varii Spencer, 1964
- Phytomyza varipes Macquart, 1835
- Phytomyza varronivora Monteiro, Barbosa & Esposito, 2019
- Phytomyza venerabilis Spencer, 1977
- Phytomyza veratri Hering, 1941
- Phytomyza verbenae Eiseman & Lonsdale, 2018
- Phytomyza vernalis Groschke, 1957
- Phytomyza veronicicola Hering, 1925
- Phytomyza verticillatae Kulp, 1968
- Phytomyza vetusta Théobald, 1937
- Phytomyza viduata Meigen, 1838
- Phytomyza vilnensis Pakalniškis, 1998
- Phytomyza virgaureae Hering, 1926
- Phytomyza virosae Pakalniškis, 2000
- Phytomyza vitalae Kaltenbach, 1872
- Phytomyza vitalbae Kaltenbach, 1872
- Phytomyza vitalbella Hering, 1957
- Phytomyza vittata (Meigen, 1838)
- Phytomyza vivida (Spencer, 1965)
- Phytomyza vockerothi Winkler, 2009
- Phytomyza vomitoriae Kulp, 1968
- Phytomyza wahlgreni Rydén, 1944
- Phytomyza williamsoni Blanchard, 1954
- Phytomyza winkleri Lonsdale, 2021
- Phytomyza xanthocephala (Zetterstedt, 1860)
- Phytomyza xiphochaeta Hendel, 1935
- Phytomyza xylostei Goureau, 1851
- Phytomyza yasumatsui (Sasakawa, 1955)
- Phytomyza zapatai Korytkowski, 2014
- Phytomyza zarzyckii Nowakowski, 1975
- Phytomyza zimini (Zlobin, 1993)
- Phytomyza zinovjevi Zlobin, 1994
- Phytomyza ziziae Eiseman & Lonsdale, 2018
- Phytomyza zlobini Winkler, 2009
- BOLD:AAF5490 (Phytomyza sp.)
- BOLD:AAG4753 (Phytomyza sp.)
- BOLD:AAG4775 (Phytomyza sp.)
- BOLD:AAG4776 (Phytomyza sp.)
- BOLD:AAH9392 (Phytomyza sp.)
- BOLD:AAL4155 (Phytomyza sp.)
- BOLD:AAL4211 (Phytomyza sp.)
- BOLD:AAN5437 (Phytomyza sp.)
- BOLD:AAP2987 (Phytomyza sp.)
- BOLD:AAR9787 (Phytomyza sp.)
- BOLD:AAR9788 (Phytomyza sp.)
- BOLD:AAX3741 (Phytomyza sp.)
- BOLD:AAY3881 (Phytomyza sp.)
- BOLD:AAY3883 (Phytomyza sp.)
- BOLD:AAY3884 (Phytomyza sp.)
- BOLD:AAY3885 (Phytomyza sp.)
- BOLD:AAY3886 (Phytomyza sp.)
- BOLD:AAY3887 (Phytomyza sp.)
- BOLD:AAY3888 (Phytomyza sp.)
- BOLD:AAY3889 (Phytomyza sp.)
- BOLD:AAY3890 (Phytomyza sp.)
- BOLD:AAY3893 (Phytomyza sp.)
- BOLD:AAY3898 (Phytomyza sp.)
- BOLD:AAY3899 (Phytomyza sp.)
- BOLD:AAY3901 (Phytomyza sp.)
- BOLD:AAY3941 (Phytomyza sp.)
- BOLD:AAY3942 (Phytomyza sp.)
- BOLD:AAY3944 (Phytomyza sp.)
- BOLD:AAY3945 (Phytomyza sp.)
- BOLD:AAY3947 (Phytomyza sp.)
- BOLD:AAY3948 (Phytomyza sp.)
- BOLD:AAY3949 (Phytomyza sp.)
- BOLD:AAY3957 (Phytomyza sp.)
- BOLD:ABW5489 (Phytomyza sp.)
- BOLD:ABX0259 (Phytomyza sp.)
- BOLD:ABX2164 (Phytomyza sp.)
- BOLD:ACB0972 (Phytomyza sp.)
- BOLD:ACC1107 (Phytomyza sp.)
- BOLD:ACC1108 (Phytomyza sp.)
- BOLD:ACC1238 (Phytomyza sp.)
- BOLD:ACC1516 (Phytomyza sp.)
- BOLD:ACC4386 (Phytomyza sp.)
- BOLD:ACC4458 (Phytomyza sp.)
- BOLD:ACC5519 (Phytomyza sp.)
- BOLD:ACC6326 (Phytomyza sp.)
- BOLD:ACC6481 (Phytomyza sp.)
- BOLD:ACC8877 (Phytomyza sp.)
- BOLD:ACD0532 (Phytomyza sp.)
- BOLD:ACD3309 (Phytomyza sp.)
- BOLD:ACD3369 (Phytomyza sp.)
- BOLD:ACE0704 (Phytomyza sp.)
- BOLD:ACE7084 (Phytomyza sp.)
- BOLD:ACF7427 (Phytomyza sp.)
- BOLD:ACG0481 (Phytomyza sp.)
- BOLD:ACG2112 (Phytomyza sp.)
- BOLD:ACG4255 (Phytomyza sp.)
- BOLD:ACG4285 (Phytomyza sp.)
- BOLD:ACG4829 (Phytomyza sp.)
- BOLD:ACG5827 (Phytomyza sp.)
- BOLD:ACG6079 (Phytomyza sp.)
- BOLD:ACI3892 (Phytomyza sp.)
- BOLD:ACI4071 (Phytomyza sp.)
- BOLD:ACI5021 (Phytomyza sp.)
- BOLD:ACI5038 (Phytomyza sp.)
- BOLD:ACI8703 (Phytomyza sp.)
- BOLD:ACJ3847 (Phytomyza sp.)
- BOLD:ACK1658 (Phytomyza sp.)
- BOLD:ACK2451 (Phytomyza sp.)
- BOLD:ACM7162 (Phytomyza sp.)
- BOLD:ACN8054 (Phytomyza sp.)
- BOLD:ACO1223 (Phytomyza sp.)
- BOLD:ACO4647 (Phytomyza sp.)
- BOLD:ACO9983 (Phytomyza sp.)
- BOLD:ACP3876 (Phytomyza sp.)
- BOLD:ACP5876 (Phytomyza sp.)
- BOLD:ACP5941 (Phytomyza sp.)
- BOLD:ACP6320 (Phytomyza sp.)
- BOLD:ACP6869 (Phytomyza sp.)
- BOLD:ACP7355 (Phytomyza sp.)
- BOLD:ACP8542 (Phytomyza sp.)
- BOLD:ACP9372 (Phytomyza sp.)
- BOLD:ACR0073 (Phytomyza sp.)
- BOLD:ACR0535 (Phytomyza sp.)
- BOLD:ACR1468 (Phytomyza sp.)
- BOLD:ACR3013 (Phytomyza sp.)
- BOLD:ACR3022 (Phytomyza sp.)
- BOLD:ACR3108 (Phytomyza sp.)
- BOLD:ACS4079 (Phytomyza sp.)
- BOLD:ACU3718 (Phytomyza sp.)
- BOLD:ACV4673 (Phytomyza sp.)
- BOLD:ACX1288 (Phytomyza sp.)
- BOLD:ACX1377 (Phytomyza sp.)
- BOLD:ACX1436 (Phytomyza sp.)
- BOLD:ACX1740 (Phytomyza sp.)
- BOLD:ACX1801 (Phytomyza sp.)
- BOLD:ACX1819 (Phytomyza sp.)
- BOLD:ACX1845 (Phytomyza sp.)
- BOLD:ACX1854 (Phytomyza sp.)
- BOLD:ACX2037 (Phytomyza sp.)
- BOLD:ACX2143 (Phytomyza sp.)
- BOLD:ACX2168 (Phytomyza sp.)
- BOLD:ACX2174 (Phytomyza sp.)
- BOLD:ACX2175 (Phytomyza sp.)
- BOLD:ACX2263 (Phytomyza sp.)
- BOLD:ACX2264 (Phytomyza sp.)
- BOLD:ACX2290 (Phytomyza sp.)
- BOLD:ACX2303 (Phytomyza sp.)
- BOLD:ACX2460 (Phytomyza sp.)
- BOLD:ACX2558 (Phytomyza sp.)
- BOLD:ACX2559 (Phytomyza sp.)
- BOLD:ACX2654 (Phytomyza sp.)
- BOLD:ACX2656 (Phytomyza sp.)
- BOLD:ACX2831 (Phytomyza sp.)
- BOLD:ACX2849 (Phytomyza sp.)
- BOLD:ACX3018 (Phytomyza sp.)
- BOLD:ACX3028 (Phytomyza sp.)
- BOLD:ACX3062 (Phytomyza sp.)
- BOLD:ACX3227 (Phytomyza sp.)
- BOLD:ACX3267 (Phytomyza sp.)
- BOLD:ACX3297 (Phytomyza sp.)
- BOLD:ACX3315 (Phytomyza sp.)
- BOLD:ACX4877 (Phytomyza sp.)
- BOLD:ACZ4227 (Phytomyza sp.)
- BOLD:ADD1316 (Phytomyza sp.)
- BOLD:ADH5120 (Phytomyza sp.)
- BOLD:ADL1213 (Phytomyza sp.)
- BOLD:ADX3795 (Phytomyza sp.)
- BOLD:ADX4553 (Phytomyza sp.)
- BOLD:AEB6059 (Phytomyza sp.)
- BOLD:AEB9101 (Phytomyza sp.)
- BOLD:AEB9731 (Phytomyza sp.)
- BOLD:AEH1648 (Phytomyza sp.)
- BOLD:AEI2018 (Phytomyza sp.)
