= Phytomyza crassiseta =

Scientific classification
- Kingdom: Animalia
- Phylum: Arthropoda
- Class: Insecta
- Order: Diptera
- Family: Agromyzidae
- Subfamily: Phytomyzinae
- Genus: Phytomyza
- Species: P. crassiseta

Binomial name
- Phytomyza crassiseta Zetterstedt, 1860

Synonyms
- Phytomyza veronicae Brischke, 1881; Phytomyza veronicae Kaltenbach, 1874

Species of fly

Phytomyza crassiseta is a species of fly in the family Agromyzidae.

== Distribution ==
Canada, United States, Europe.
