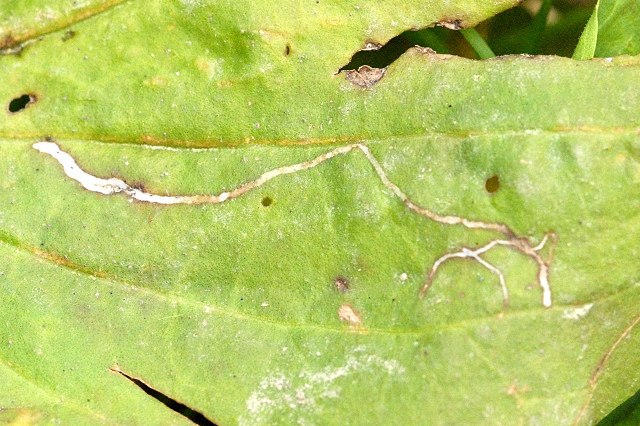
- Phytomyza plantaginis from Commanster, Belgian High Ardennes

Scientific classification
- Kingdom: Animalia
- Phylum: Arthropoda
- Class: Insecta
- Order: Diptera
- Family: Agromyzidae
- Subfamily: Phytomyzinae
- Genus: Phytomyza
- Species: P. plantaginis

Binomial name
- Phytomyza plantaginis Goureau, 1851

Synonyms
- Phytomyza biseriata Hering, 1936; Phytomyza genualis Loew, 1869; Phytomyza nannodes Hendel, 1935; Phytomyza plantaginicaulis Hering, 1944; Phytomyza plantaginis Robineau-Desvoidy, 1851; Phytomyza robinaldi Goureau, 1848; Phytomyza robinaldi Goureau, 1851

= Phytomyza plantaginis =

Species of fly

Phytomyza plantaginis is a species of fly in the family Agromyzidae.

== Distribution ==
France.
