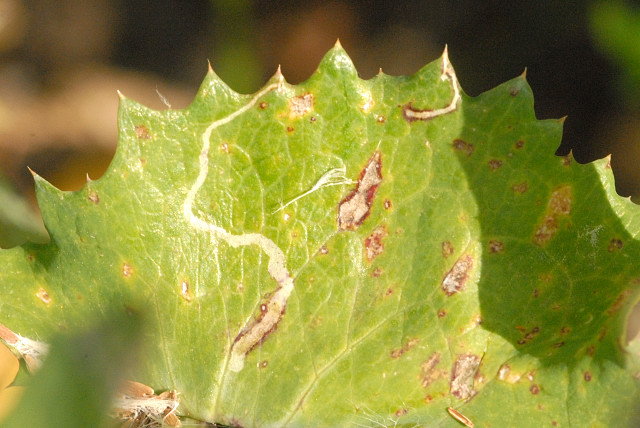
- Leaf mine of P.horticola

Scientific classification
- Kingdom: Animalia
- Phylum: Arthropoda
- Clade: Pancrustacea
- Class: Insecta
- Order: Diptera
- Family: Agromyzidae
- Subfamily: Phytomyzinae
- Genus: Phytomyza
- Species: P. horticola

Binomial name
- Phytomyza horticola Goureau, 1851

Synonyms
- Napomyza lactucae Vimmer, 1926; Phytomyza bidensivora Séguy, 1951; Phytomyza cucumidis Macquart, 1855; Phytomyza fediae Kaltenbach, 1860; Phytomyza horticola Goureau, 1848; Phytomyza hortulana Robineau-Desvoidy, 1851; Phytomyza linariae Kaltenbach, 1862; Phytomyza pisi Kaltenbach, 1864; Phytomyza tropaeoli Dufour, 1857

= Phytomyza horticola =

Species of fly

Phytomyza horticola is a species of leaf-mining fly in the family Agromyzidae of the order Diptera. For a time it was treated as Chromatomyia horticola, but its original name has been restored after genus Chromatomyia was synonymized with Phytomyza. The species is a pest of high economic importance affecting the vegetable crops in temperate and tropical regions.

== Habitat and distribution ==
Phytomyza horticola is recorded in around 268 genera of 36 families, commonly Brassicaceae, Fabaceae and Asteraceae. The polyphagous pest is distributed in various regions of Africa, Asia, and Europe.
