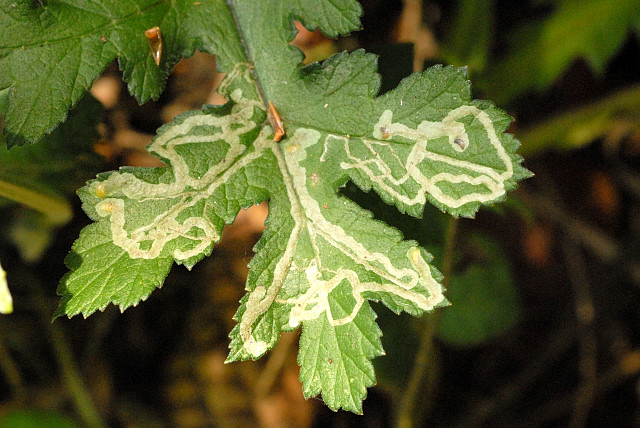
- Phytomyza spondylii

Scientific classification
- Kingdom: Animalia
- Phylum: Arthropoda
- Class: Insecta
- Order: Diptera
- Family: Agromyzidae
- Subfamily: Phytomyzinae
- Genus: Phytomyza
- Species: P. spondylii

Binomial name
- Phytomyza spondylii Goureau, 1851

Synonyms
- Phytomyza sphondylii Hendel, 1935; Phytomyza spondilii Goureau, 1851; Phytomyza spondylii Robineau-Desvoidy, 1851; Phytomyza spondylii ssp. heracleiphaga Spencer, 1969

= Phytomyza spondylii =

Species of fly

Phytomyza spondylii is a species of fly in the family Agromyzidae.

== Distribution ==
France.
