= Phytomyza ancholiae =

Scientific classification
- Kingdom: Animalia
- Phylum: Arthropoda
- Class: Insecta
- Order: Diptera
- Family: Agromyzidae
- Subfamily: Phytomyzinae
- Genus: Phytomyza
- Species: P. ancholiae

Binomial name
- Phytomyza ancholiae Goureau, 1851

Synonyms
- Phytomyza aquilegiae Robineau-Desvoidy, 1851; Phytomyza minuscula Goureau, 1848; Phytomyza minuscula Goureau, 1851

Species of fly

Phytomyza ancholiae is a species of fly in the family Agromyzidae.in the Phytomyza minuscula group, along with Phytomyza aquilegivora (the columbine leafminer).

== Distribution ==
France.
