= Phytomyza hellebori =

Scientific classification
- Kingdom: Animalia
- Phylum: Arthropoda
- Class: Insecta
- Order: Diptera
- Family: Agromyzidae
- Subfamily: Phytomyzinae
- Genus: Phytomyza
- Species: P. hellebori

Binomial name
- Phytomyza hellebori Kaltenbach, 1872

Synonyms
- Phytomyza hellebornia Hering, 1932

Species of fly

Phytomyza hellebori is a species of fly in the family Agromyzidae. The larvae can be found in Europe feeding on hellebore (Helleborus species).

== Distribution ==
Germany.
