= Phytomyza angelicae =

Scientific classification
- Kingdom: Animalia
- Phylum: Arthropoda
- Class: Insecta
- Order: Diptera
- Family: Agromyzidae
- Subfamily: Phytomyzinae
- Genus: Phytomyza
- Species: P. angelicae

Binomial name
- Phytomyza angelicae Kaltenbach, 1874

Synonyms
- Phytomyza aegopodii Hendel, 1923; Phytomyza laserpitii Hendel, 1924

Species of fly

Phytomyza angelicae is a species of fly in the family Agromyzidae.

== Distribution ==
Canada, United States, Europe.
