= Phytomyza zlobini =

Scientific classification
- Kingdom: Animalia
- Phylum: Arthropoda
- Class: Insecta
- Order: Diptera
- Family: Agromyzidae
- Subfamily: Phytomyzinae
- Genus: Phytomyza
- Species: P. zlobini

Binomial name
- Phytomyza zlobini Winkler, 2009

Synonyms
- Napomyza hirta Zlobin, 1994

Species of fly

Phytomyza zlobini is a species of fly in the family Agromyzidae.

== Distribution ==
Russia.
