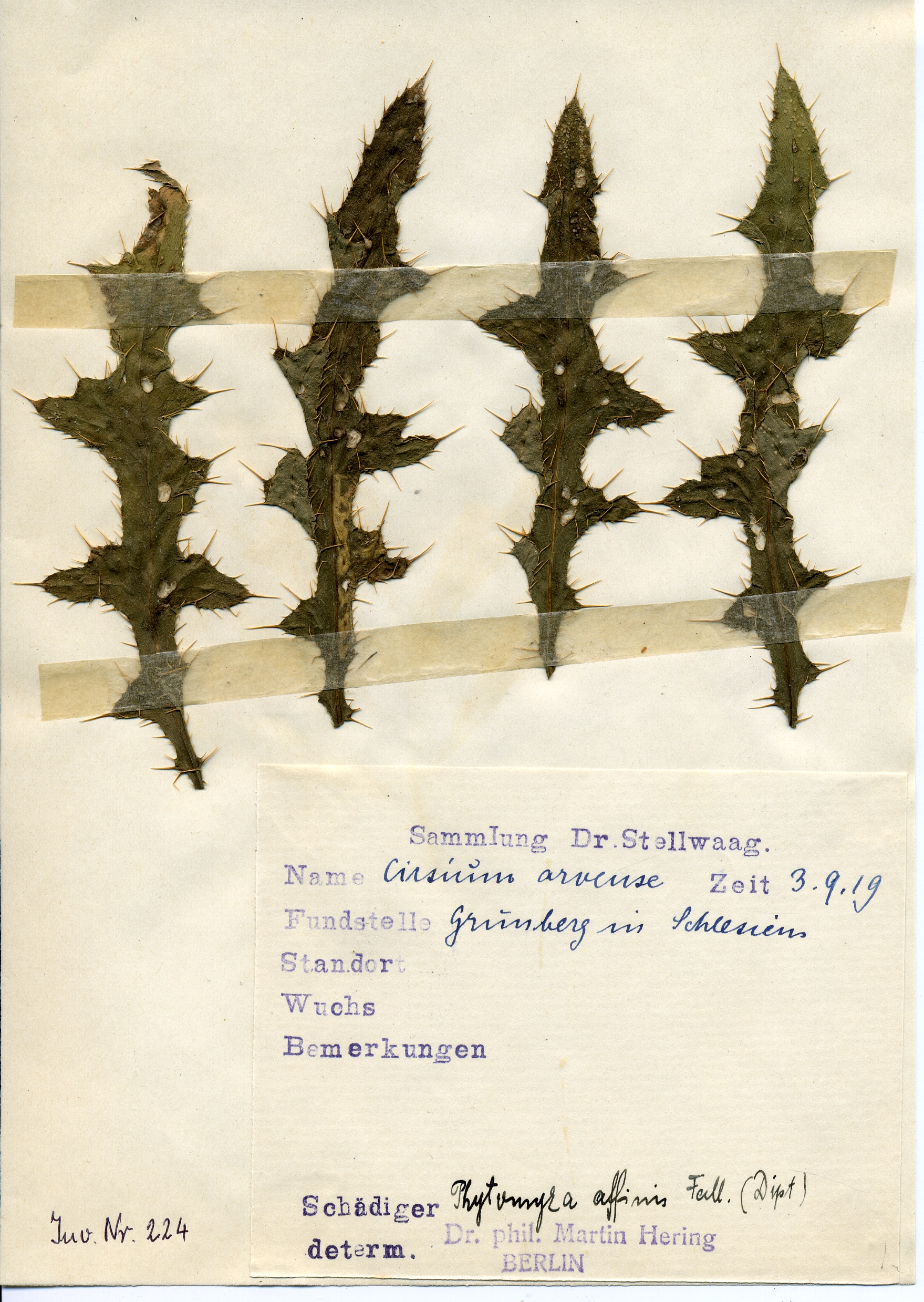
- Phytomyza affinis leaf mines on Cirsium arvense

Scientific classification
- Kingdom: Animalia
- Phylum: Arthropoda
- Class: Insecta
- Order: Diptera
- Family: Agromyzidae
- Subfamily: Phytomyzinae
- Genus: Phytomyza
- Species: P. affinis

Binomial name
- Phytomyza affinis Fallén, 1823

= Phytomyza affinis =

Species of fly

Phytomyza affinis is a species of fly in the family Agromyzidae. It is found in the Palearctic. Description of imago-Antennomere III brown black, 1-11 red. Mesonotum matt black lateral parts and notopleural depression yellow. Acrosticals in 2-4 rows. Coxae 1 yellow basally, II-III blackish. Femora yellow (black basally). Base of femora, tibiae and tarsi black. Abdomen brown black. Tergites with a yellow apical line dilated at the sides. Long. : 2,5–3 mm. The larva mines Cirsium arvense and also feeds on seeds of Euphrasia.
