= Phytomyza penstemonis =

Scientific classification
- Kingdom: Animalia
- Phylum: Arthropoda
- Class: Insecta
- Order: Diptera
- Family: Agromyzidae
- Subfamily: Phytomyzinae
- Genus: Phytomyza
- Species: P. penstemonis

Binomial name
- Phytomyza penstemonis Spencer, 1969

Synonyms
- Phytomyza colemanensis Sehgal, 1971

Species of fly

Phytomyza penstemonis is a species of fly in the family Agromyzidae.

== Distribution ==
United States.
