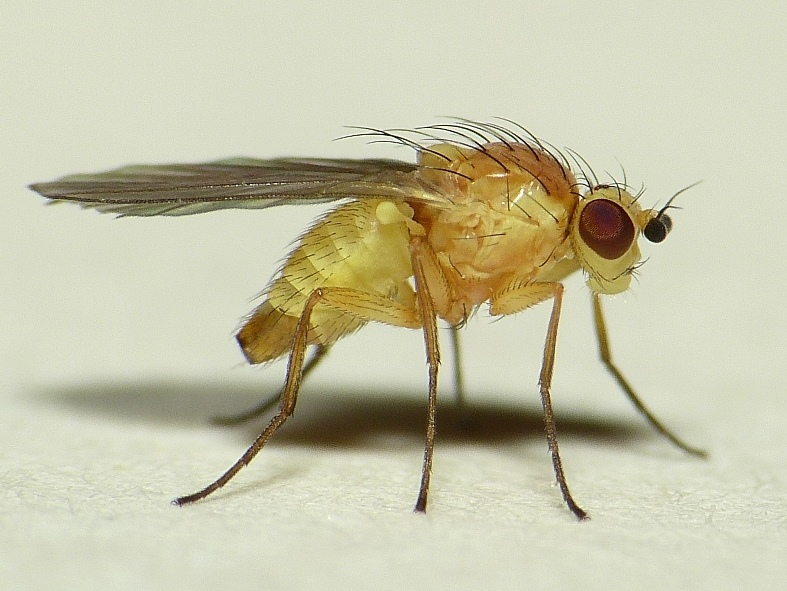
- Phytomyza ranunculi Netherlands

Scientific classification
- Kingdom: Animalia
- Phylum: Arthropoda
- Class: Insecta
- Order: Diptera
- Family: Agromyzidae
- Subfamily: Phytomyzinae
- Genus: Phytomyza
- Species: P. ranunculi

Binomial name
- Phytomyza ranunculi (Schrank, 1803)

Synonyms
- Musca ranunculi Schrank, 1803; Phytomyza albipes Meigen, 1830; Phytomyza cinerovittata Zetterstedt, 1848; Phytomyza citrina Roser, 1840; Phytomyza flava Fallén, 1823; Phytomyza flaveola Fallén, 1810; Phytomyza flavoscutellata Fallén, 1823; Phytomyza flavotibialis Strobl, 1902; Phytomyza incisa Macquart, 1835; Phytomyza islandica Rydén, 1953; Phytomyza linguae Lundqvist, 1947; Phytomyza maculipes Brullé, 1833; Phytomyza maculipes Zetterstedt, 1848; Phytomyza pallida Meigen, 1830; Phytomyza praecox Meigen, 1830; Phytomyza ranunculi Goureau, 1851; Phytomyza ranunculi Kaltenbach, 1867; Phytomyza ranunculi Robineau-Desvoidy, 1851; Phytomyza ranunculi ssp. pentalinearis Kuroda, 1954; Phytomyza scutellata Meigen, 1830; Phytomyza tenuipennis Singh & Ipe, 1973; Phytomyza terminalis Meigen, 1830; Phytomyza vitripennis Meigen, 1830; Phytomyza zetterstedti Schiner, 1862

= Phytomyza ranunculi =

Species of fly

Phytomyza ranunculi is a species of fly in the family Agromyzidae. It is found in the Palearctic.

== Life cycle ==
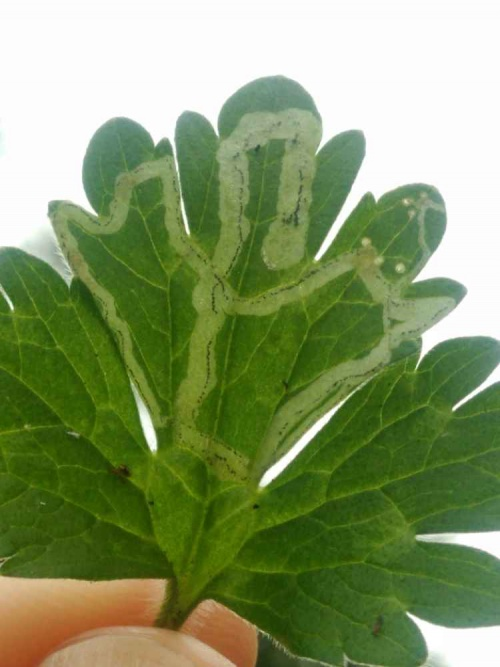
Phytomyza ranunculi leaf mine

Eggs are laid on plants in the Ranunculaceae family. The larvae are, primarily, leaf-miners. They form a long, conspicuous white mine with the frass present in close strings.

In 2018 the first confirmed adults were reared from stem-mines of meadow buttercup (Ranunculus acris). This is a rare example of 'organoxeny', where a phytophagous insect occurs on a different part of a plant from where it can normally be found .

The larvae pupates into a greyish or brown puparium, with posterior spiracles each with about 18-20 bulbs. Adult flies are approximately 2 mm in length. Adults are highly variable in colour, with several named variants including a pale form (P. ranunculi var. flava) and dark forms (P. ranunculi var. flavoscutellata and var. islandica).

== Distribution ==
The fly is widespread throughout Europe.

== Parasitoids ==
P. ranunculi pupae are particularly at risk from parasitism. Up to 75% of all reared puparium have been shown to be parasitised. Parasitoids of this species include numerous species in the hymenoptera superfamilies Chalcidoidea and Ichneumonoidea:

- Chrysocharis idyia (Walker, 1839)
- Chrysocharis orbicularis (Nees, 1834)
- Chrysocharis pentheus (Walker, 1839)
- Chrysocharis pubicornis (Zetterstedt, 1838)
- Chrysocharis viridis (Nees, 1934)
- Pediobius metallicus (Nees, 1834)
- Cirrospilus vittatus Walker, 1838
- Diglyphus chabrias (Walker, 1838)
- Diglyphus isaea (Walker, 1838)
- Diglyphus minoeus (Walker, 1838)
- Diglyphus pusztensis (Erdös and Novicky, 1951)
- Hemiptarsenus ornatus (Nees, 1834)
- Hemiptarsenus unguicellus (Zetterstedt, 1838)
- Necremnus tidius (Walker, 1839)
- Pnigalio soemius (Walker, 1839)
- Miscogaster elegans Walker, 1833
- Miscogaster maculata Walker, 1833
- Stenomalina gracilis (Walker, 1934)
- Epiclerus panyas (Walker, 1839)
- Chorebus kama (Nixon, 1945)
- Coloneura stylata Förster, 1862
- Dacnusa areolaris (Nees, 1811)
- Dacnusa confinis Ruthe, 1859
- Dacnusa laeta (Nixon, 1954)
- Dacnusa laevipectus Thomson, 1895
- Dacnusa macrospila (Haliday, 1839)
- Dacnusa maculipes Thomson, 1895
- Dacnusa melicerta (Nixon, 1954)
- Dacnusa sibirica Telenga, 1935
- Dapsilarthra sylvia (Haliday, 1839)
- Exotela gilvipes (Haliday, 1839)
- Grammospila rufiventris (Nees, 1812)
- Colastes braconius Haliday, 1833
- Apodesmia posticatae (Fischer, 1957)
- Opius pallipes Wesmael, 1835
- Opius orbiculator (Nees, 1811)
