= Phytomyza agromyzina =

- Leaf mine - Arnhem,Rijkerswoerdse Plassen, the Netherlands

Scientific classification
- Kingdom: Animalia
- Phylum: Arthropoda
- Clade: Pancrustacea
- Class: Insecta
- Order: Diptera
- Family: Agromyzidae
- Subfamily: Phytomyzinae
- Genus: Phytomyza
- Species: P. agromyzina

Binomial name
- Phytomyza agromyzina Meigen, 1830

Synonyms
- Phytomyza similis Brischke, 1881

Species of fly

Phytomyza agromyzina is a species of fly in the family Agromyzidae. It was first described by Johann Wilhelm Meigen.

== Distribution ==
This species is found in Canada, United States, and Europe.

== Ecology ==
Phytomyza agromyzina larvae are leaf-mining, feeding on the leaves of dogwood plants (genus Cornus). It is parasitized by Chrysocharis viridis, a parasitoid wasp.
