= Phytomyza ditmani =

Scientific classification
- Kingdom: Animalia
- Phylum: Arthropoda
- Class: Insecta
- Order: Diptera
- Family: Agromyzidae
- Subfamily: Phytomyzinae
- Genus: Phytomyza
- Species: P. ditmani

Binomial name
- Phytomyza ditmani Kulp, 1968

Species of fly

Phytomyza ditmani is a species of fly in the family Agromyzidae.

== Distribution ==
District of Columbia.
