= Phytomyza aconiti =

Scientific classification
- Kingdom: Animalia
- Phylum: Arthropoda
- Class: Insecta
- Order: Diptera
- Family: Agromyzidae
- Subfamily: Phytomyzinae
- Genus: Phytomyza
- Species: P. aconiti

Binomial name
- Phytomyza aconiti Hendel, 1920

Synonyms
- Phytomyza delphiniae Frost, 1928

Species of fly

Phytomyza aconiti, the larkspur leafminer, is a species of leaf miner fly in the family Agromyzidae.

== Distribution ==
Canada, United States, Europe.
