= Phytomyza breviseta =

Scientific classification
- Kingdom: Animalia
- Phylum: Arthropoda
- Class: Insecta
- Order: Diptera
- Family: Agromyzidae
- Subfamily: Phytomyzinae
- Genus: Phytomyza
- Species: P. breviseta

Binomial name
- Phytomyza breviseta (Zetterstedt, 1860)

Synonyms
- Agromyza breviseta Zetterstedt, 1860

Species of fly

Phytomyza breviseta is a species of fly in the family Agromyzidae.

== Distribution ==
Sweden.
