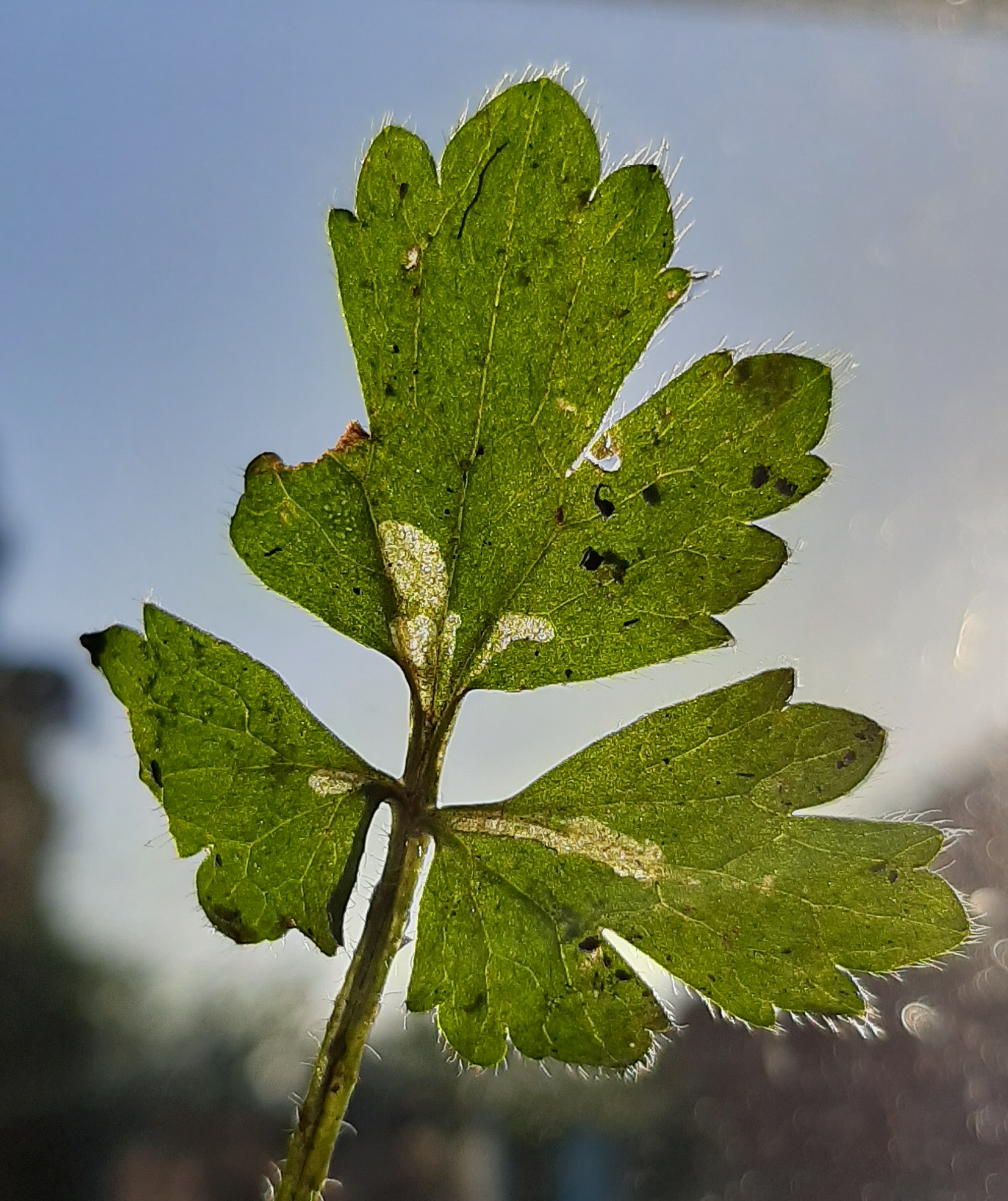

Scientific classification
- Kingdom: Animalia
- Phylum: Arthropoda
- Class: Insecta
- Order: Diptera
- Family: Agromyzidae
- Subfamily: Phytomyzinae
- Genus: Phytomyza
- Species: P. stolonigena

Binomial name
- Phytomyza stolonigena Hering, 1949

= Phytomyza stolonigena =

Species of fly

Phytomyza stolonigena is a leaf mining fly in the family Agromyzidae, whose larvae burrow into leaves of Ranunculus. The larvae of the fly make characteristic mines in Ranunculus leaves; they mine in the petiole, making single corridors that fan out into the leaf blade.

== Distribution ==
Germany.
