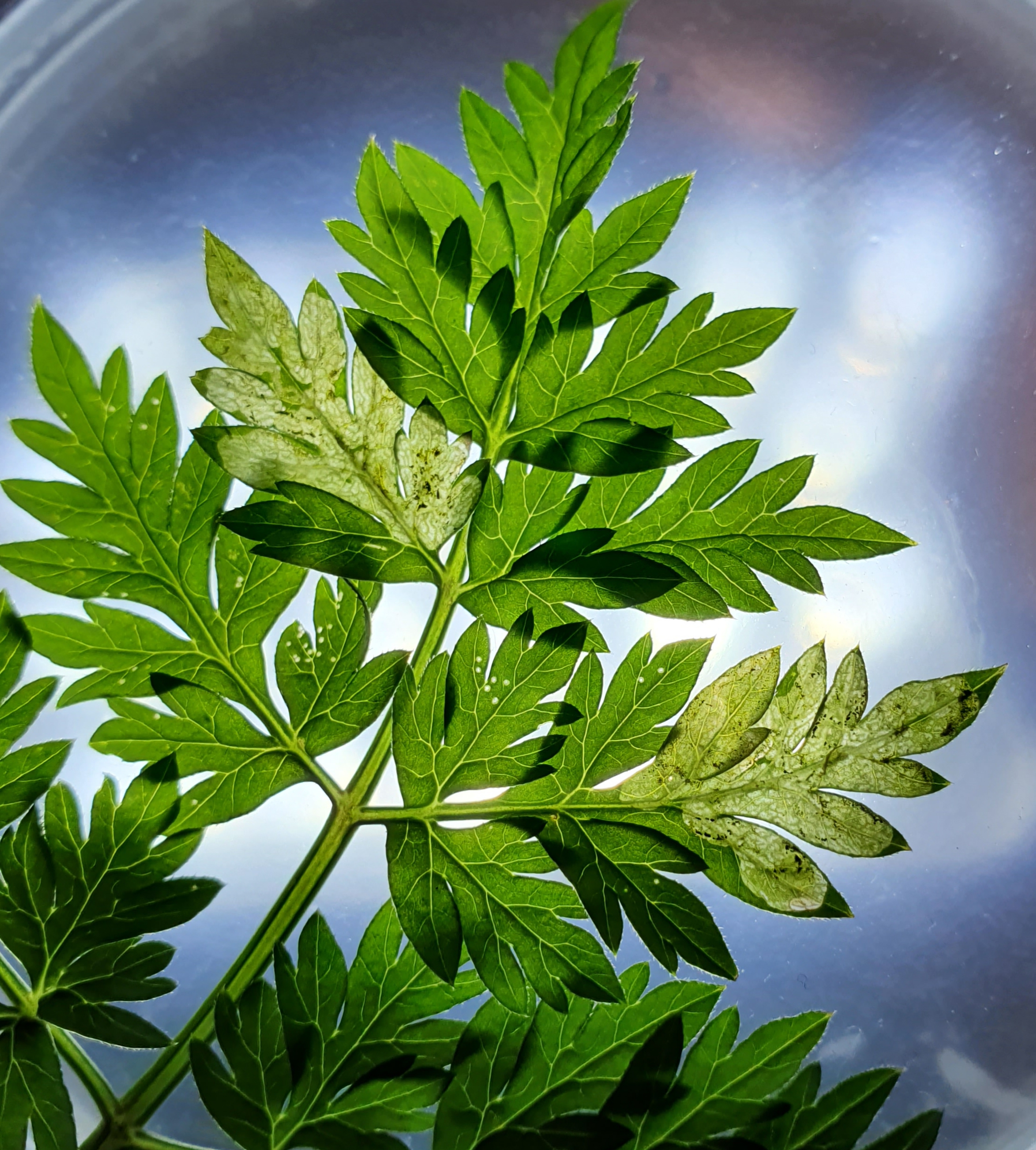
- Mine on cow parsley

Scientific classification
- Kingdom: Animalia
- Phylum: Arthropoda
- Class: Insecta
- Order: Diptera
- Family: Agromyzidae
- Genus: Phytomyza
- Species: P. chaerophylli

Binomial name
- Phytomyza chaerophylli Kaltenbach, 1856

Synonyms
- Phytomyza anthrisci Hendel, 1924; Phytomyza aromatici Hering, 1931; Phytomyza carvi Hering, 1932; Phytomyza coniophila Hering, 1931; Phytomyza conopodii Hering, 1943; Phytomyza daucivora Hering, 1931; Phytomyza sisonis Hering, 1943; Phytomyza tordylii Hendel, 1927

= Phytomyza chaerophylli =

Species of insect

Phytomyza chaerophylli is a species of leaf mining fly in the family Agromyzidae which is found in Europe.

== Description ==
The larvae make a short upper-surface gallery following a leaf margin which widens, so that within the confined limits of some umbelliferous leaves often forms a secondary blotch. The frass is in two untidy rows of isolated grains. Larvae leave the leaf through a semi-circular slit in the lower epidermis to pupate in the soil. Plant species which the fly larvae feed on include Sison amomum.

Mines and larvae can be found throughout the winter, the first generation from April to July although larvae can be found feeding through most of the year.

== Distribution ==
Widespread and common throughout much of Europe.
