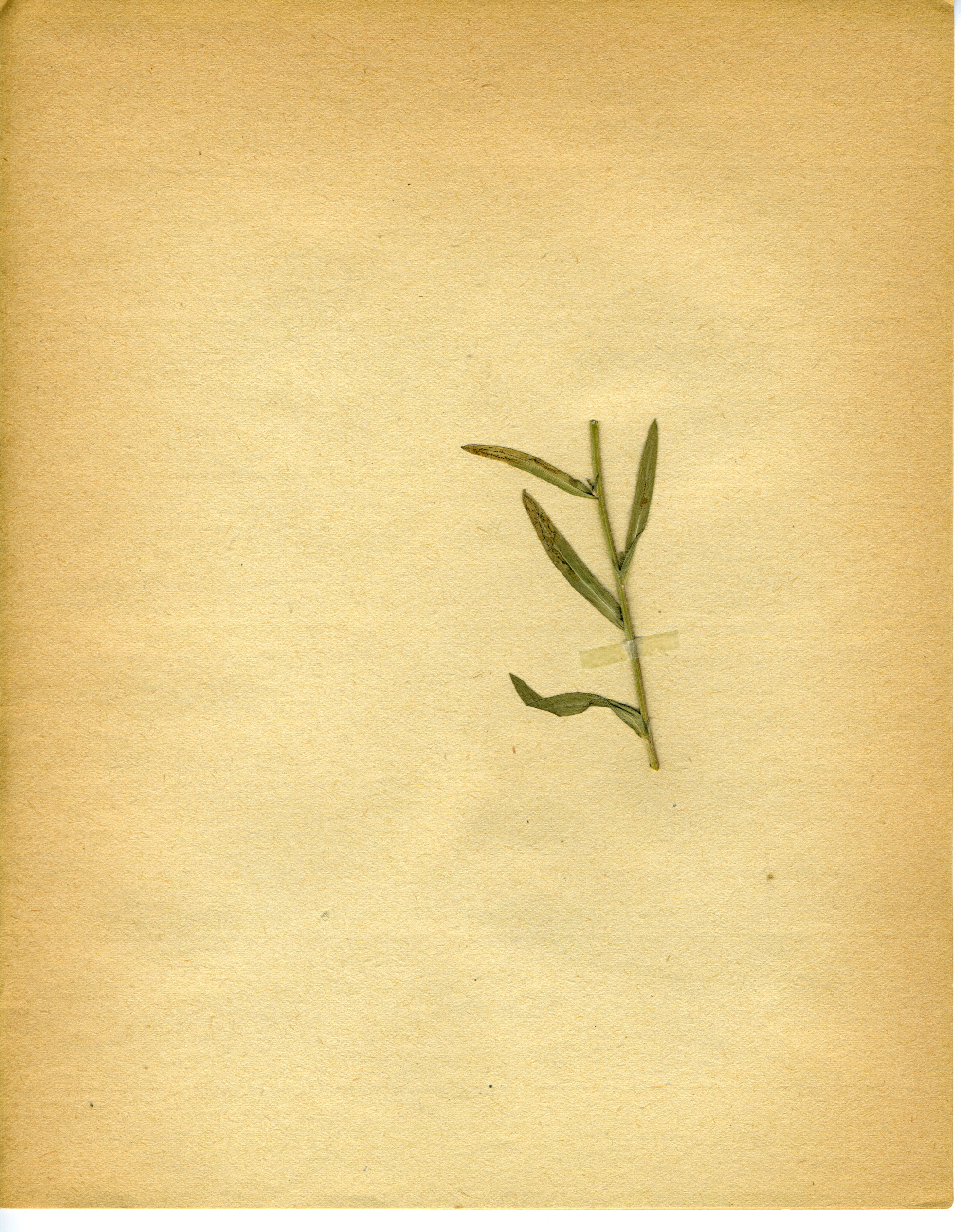

Scientific classification
- Kingdom: Animalia
- Phylum: Arthropoda
- Class: Insecta
- Order: Diptera
- Family: Agromyzidae
- Subfamily: Phytomyzinae
- Genus: Phytomyza
- Species: P. erigerophila

Binomial name
- Phytomyza erigerophila Hering, 1927

Synonyms
- Phytomyza archhieracii Hering, 1927; Phytomyza asteribia Hering, 1935

= Phytomyza erigerophila =

Species of fly

Phytomyza erigerophila is a species of fly in the family Agromyzidae.

== Distribution ==
Canada, United States, Europe.
