= Phytomyza plumiseta =

Scientific classification
- Kingdom: Animalia
- Phylum: Arthropoda
- Class: Insecta
- Order: Diptera
- Family: Agromyzidae
- Subfamily: Phytomyzinae
- Genus: Phytomyza
- Species: P. plumiseta

Binomial name
- Phytomyza plumiseta Frost, 1924

Species of fly

Phytomyza plumiseta is a species of fly in the family Agromyzidae.

== Distribution ==
Canada, United States.
