= Selachops flavocincta =

Scientific classification
- Kingdom: Animalia
- Phylum: Arthropoda
- Class: Insecta
- Order: Diptera
- Family: Agromyzidae
- Subfamily: Phytomyzinae
- Genus: Selachops
- Species: S. flavocincta

Binomial name
- Selachops flavocincta Wahlberg, 1844

Synonyms
- Encoelocera bicolor Loew, 1844

Species of fly

Selachops flavocincta is a species of fly in the family Agromyzidae.

== Distribution ==
Europe.
