= Phytomyza aquilegiana =

Scientific classification
- Kingdom: Animalia
- Phylum: Arthropoda
- Class: Insecta
- Order: Diptera
- Family: Agromyzidae
- Subfamily: Phytomyzinae
- Genus: Phytomyza
- Species: P. aquilegiana

Binomial name
- Phytomyza aquilegiana Frost, 1930

Species of fly

Phytomyza aquilegiana, known generally as the columbine leafminer, is a species of fly in the family Agromyzidae.

== Distribution ==
The species is found in the Southeastern United States.
