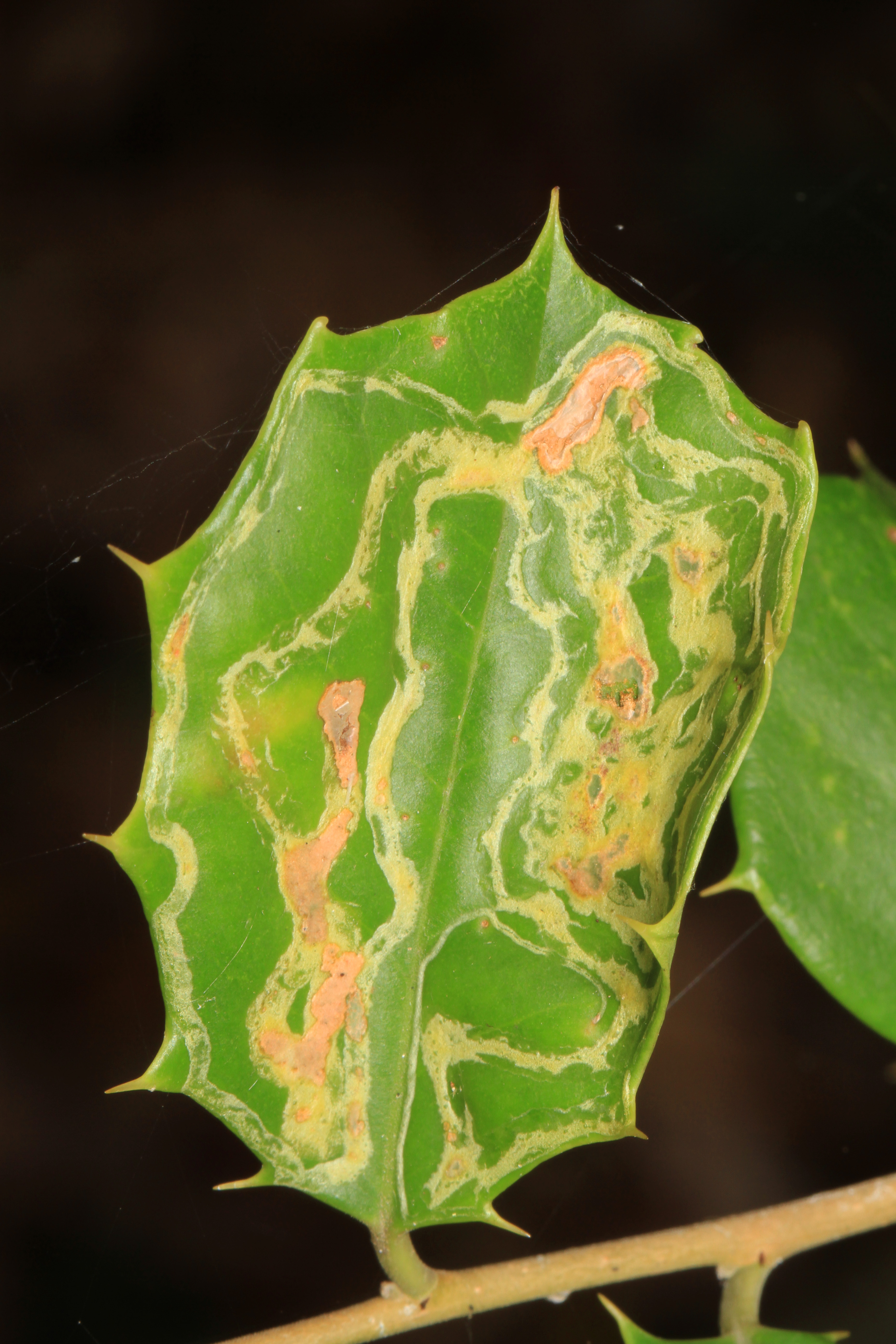
- Leaf mines caused by P. opacae

Scientific classification
- Kingdom: Animalia
- Phylum: Arthropoda
- Class: Insecta
- Order: Diptera
- Family: Agromyzidae
- Subfamily: Phytomyzinae
- Genus: Phytomyza
- Species: P. opacae

Binomial name
- Phytomyza opacae Kulp, 1968

= Phytomyza opacae =

Species of fly

Phytomyza opacae is a species of fly in the family Agromyzidae. Its host plants are Ilex myrtifolia, Ilex cassine, Ilex opaca, and Ilex amelanchier.
