= Phytomyza davisii =

Scientific classification
- Kingdom: Animalia
- Phylum: Arthropoda
- Class: Insecta
- Order: Diptera
- Family: Agromyzidae
- Subfamily: Phytomyzinae
- Genus: Phytomyza
- Species: P. davisii

Binomial name
- Phytomyza davisii (Walton, 1912)

Synonyms
- Agromyza davisii Walton, 1912

Species of fly

Phytomyza davisii is a species of fly in the family Agromyzidae.

== Distribution ==
Canada, United States.
