= Phytomyza ovalis =

Scientific classification
- Kingdom: Animalia
- Phylum: Arthropoda
- Class: Insecta
- Order: Diptera
- Family: Agromyzidae
- Subfamily: Phytomyzinae
- Genus: Phytomyza
- Species: P. ovalis

Binomial name
- Phytomyza ovalis Griffiths, 1975

Species of fly

Phytomyza ovalis is a species of fly in the family Agromyzidae.

== Distribution ==
United States.
