= Phytomyza pastinacae =

Scientific classification
- Kingdom: Animalia
- Phylum: Arthropoda
- Class: Insecta
- Order: Diptera
- Family: Agromyzidae
- Subfamily: Phytomyzinae
- Genus: Phytomyza
- Species: P. pastinacae

Binomial name
- Phytomyza pastinacae Hendel, 1923

Synonyms
- Phytomyza angelicella Frost, 1927

Species of fly

Phytomyza pastinacae is a species of fly in the family Agromyzidae.

== Distribution ==
Canada, United States, Europe.
