= Phytomyza frontalis =

Scientific classification
- Kingdom: Animalia
- Phylum: Arthropoda
- Class: Insecta
- Order: Diptera
- Family: Agromyzidae
- Subfamily: Phytomyzinae
- Genus: Phytomyza
- Species: P. frontalis

Binomial name
- Phytomyza frontalis (Meigen, 1830)

Synonyms
- Agromyza frontalis Meigen, 1830

Species of fly

Phytomyza frontalis is a species of fly in the family Agromyzidae.

== Distribution ==
Germany.
