= Phytomyza solidaginophaga =

Scientific classification
- Kingdom: Animalia
- Phylum: Arthropoda
- Class: Insecta
- Order: Diptera
- Family: Agromyzidae
- Subfamily: Phytomyzinae
- Genus: Phytomyza
- Species: P. solidaginophaga

Binomial name
- Phytomyza solidaginophaga Sehgal, 1971

Species of fly

Phytomyza solidaginophaga is a species of fly in the family Agromyzidae.

== Distribution ==
Alberta.
