= Phytomyza glabricola =

Scientific classification
- Kingdom: Animalia
- Phylum: Arthropoda
- Class: Insecta
- Order: Diptera
- Family: Agromyzidae
- Subfamily: Phytomyzinae
- Genus: Phytomyza
- Species: P. glabricola

Binomial name
- Phytomyza glabricola Kulp, 1968

Species of fly

Phytomyza glabricola, the inkberry holly leafminer, is a species of fly in the family Agromyzidae.

== Distribution ==
United States.
