= Phytomyza aldrichi =

Scientific classification
- Kingdom: Animalia
- Phylum: Arthropoda
- Class: Insecta
- Order: Diptera
- Family: Agromyzidae
- Subfamily: Phytomyzinae
- Genus: Phytomyza
- Species: P. aldrichi

Binomial name
- Phytomyza aldrichi Spencer, 1986

Species of fly

Phytomyza aldrichi is a species of fly in the family Agromyzidae.

== Distribution ==
Idaho.
