= Paraphytomyza anomala =

Scientific classification
- Kingdom: Animalia
- Phylum: Arthropoda
- Class: Insecta
- Order: Diptera
- Family: Agromyzidae
- Subfamily: Phytomyzinae
- Genus: Paraphytomyza
- Species: P. anomala

Binomial name
- Paraphytomyza anomala (Strobl, 1893)

Synonyms
- Phytomyza anomala Strobl, 1893

Species of fly

Paraphytomyza anomala is a species of fly in the family Agromyzidae.

== Distribution ==
Austria.
