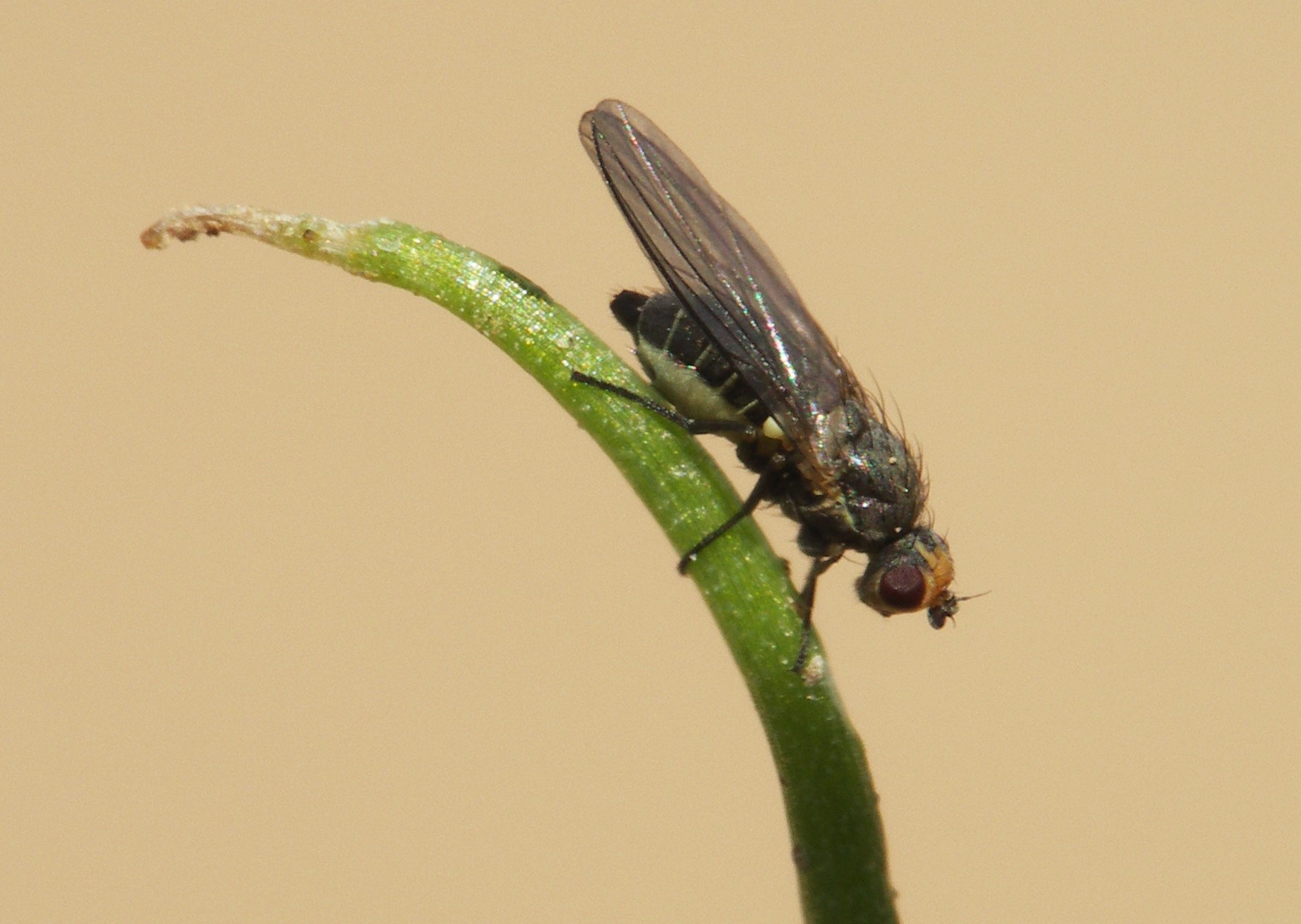
- Adult leaf miner fly lays its eggs on an Allium leaf.

Scientific classification
- Kingdom: Animalia
- Phylum: Arthropoda
- Clade: Pancrustacea
- Class: Insecta
- Order: Diptera
- Family: Agromyzidae
- Genus: Phytomyza
- Species: P. gymnostoma

Binomial name
- Phytomyza gymnostoma Loew, 1858

= Phytomyza gymnostoma =

Species of leaf miner

Phytomyza gymnostoma, common name onion leaf miner or allium leafminer, is a species of leaf miner and an agricultural pest, specialising in crops in the Allium genus. These plants include onions, leeks, and garlic. It is native to mainland Europe, but was first detected in England in 2002, and North America in 2015. They are bivoltine, meaning they produce two generations per year.

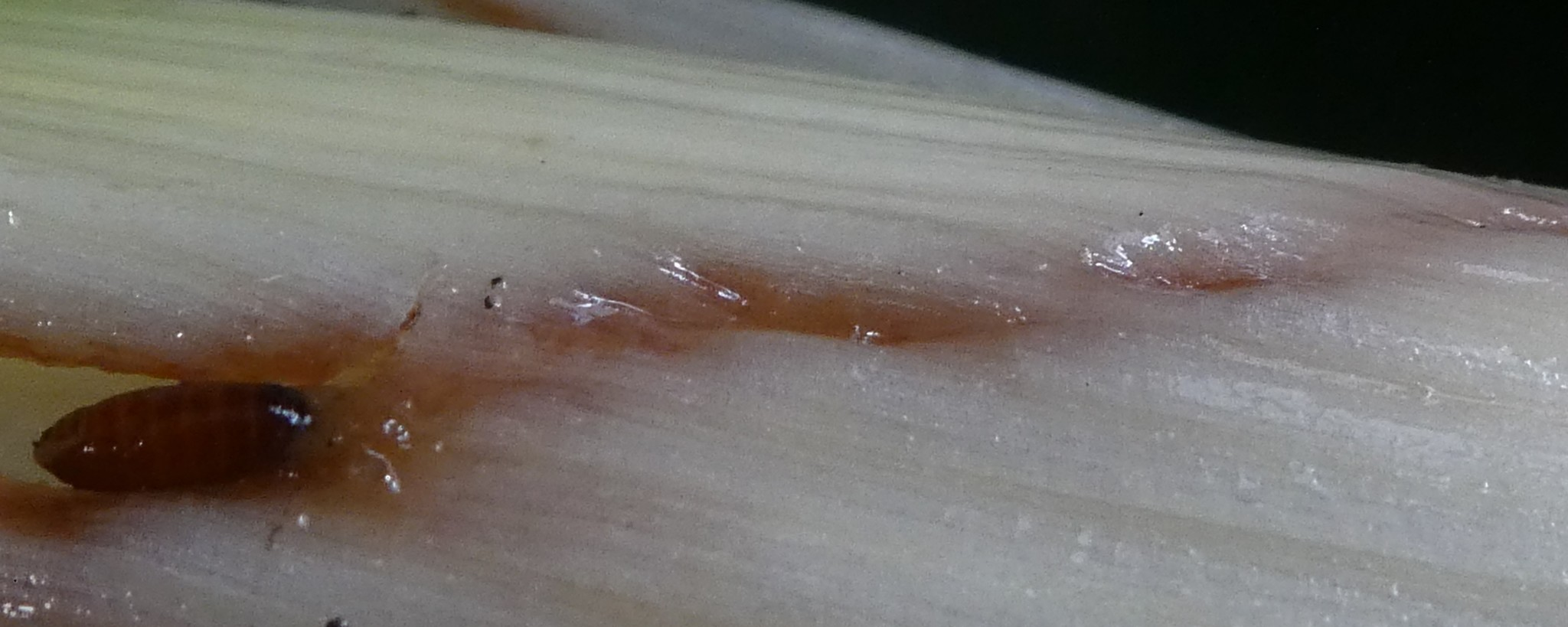
A leaf miner pupating in a leek
