= Paraphytomyza =

Scientific classification
- Kingdom: Animalia
- Phylum: Arthropoda
- Class: Insecta
- Order: Diptera
- Family: Agromyzidae
- Subfamily: Phytomyzinae
- Genus: Paraphytomyza; Enderlein, 1936

Genus of flies

Paraphytomyza is a genus of flies in the family Agromyzidae.

== Species ==
- Paraphytomyza anomala (Strobl, 1893)
- Paraphytomyza morenae (Strobl, 1900)
