= Metopomyza =

Scientific classification
- Kingdom: Animalia
- Phylum: Arthropoda
- Class: Insecta
- Order: Diptera
- Family: Agromyzidae
- Subfamily: Phytomyzinae
- Genus: Metopomyza; Enderlein, 1936

Type species
- Agromyza flavonotata Haliday, 1833

Synonyms
- Etopomyza Spencer, 1973

Genus of flies

Metopomyza is a genus of flies in the family Agromyzidae.

== Species ==
- Metopomyza adretana Boucher & Wheeler, 2001
- Metopomyza antiqua Zlobin, 1983
- Metopomyza beckeri (Strobl, 1909)
- Metopomyza danielssoni Zlobin, 1995
- Metopomyza flavipes Spencer, 1969
- Metopomyza flavonotata (Haliday, 1833)
- Metopomyza flavoscutellaris (Fallén, 1823)
- Metopomyza griffithsi Sehgal, 1971
- Metopomyza henshawi Zlobin, 2002
- Metopomyza interfrontalis (Melander, 1913)
- Metopomyza junci Tschirnhaus, 1981
- Metopomyza knutsoni Zlobin, 1995
- Metopomyza laeta Sasakawa, 1955
- Metopomyza levis Zlobin, 1995
- Metopomyza nepalensis Sasakawa, 1996
- Metopomyza nigrina Zlobin, 1995
- Metopomyza nigriorbita (Hendel, 1931)
- Metopomyza nigripes Spencer, 1981
- Metopomyza nigrohumeralis (Hendel, 1931)
- Metopomyza ornata (Meigen, 1830)
- Metopomyza taipingensis Shiao & Wu, 1997
- Metopomyza xanthaspioides (Frey, 1946)
- Metopomyza xanthaspis (Loew, 1858)
