= Selachops =

Scientific classification
- Kingdom: Animalia
- Phylum: Arthropoda
- Class: Insecta
- Order: Diptera
- Family: Agromyzidae
- Subfamily: Phytomyzinae
- Genus: Selachops; Wahlberg, 1844

Type species
- Selachops flavocincta Wahlberg, 1844

Synonyms
- Encoelocera Loew, 1844

Genus of flies

Selachops is a genus of flies in the family Agromyzidae.

== Species ==
- Selachops flavocincta Wahlberg, 1844
- Selachops intiba Zlobin, 1983
- Selachops relicta Zlobin, 1983
