= Gymnophytomyza =

Scientific classification
- Kingdom: Animalia
- Phylum: Arthropoda
- Class: Insecta
- Order: Diptera
- Family: Agromyzidae
- Subfamily: Phytomyzinae
- Genus: Gymnophytomyza; Hendel, 1936

Type species
- Phytomyza heteroneura Hendel, 1920

Genus of flies

Gymnophytomyza is a genus of flies in the family Agromyzidae.

== Species ==
- Gymnophytomyza heteroneura (Hendel, 1920)
- Gymnophytomyza secunda Zlobin, 1999
