= Haplopeodes =

Scientific classification
- Kingdom: Animalia
- Phylum: Arthropoda
- Class: Insecta
- Order: Diptera
- Family: Agromyzidae
- Subfamily: Agromyzinae
- Genus: Haplopeodes; Steyskal, 1980

Type species
- Phytomyza minuta Frost, 1924

Genus of flies

Haplopeodes is a genus of flies in the family Agromyzidae.

== Species ==
- Haplopeodes bullati (Spencer, 1963)
- Haplopeodes eurhabdus Steyskal, 1980
- Haplopeodes flavinotus Valladares, 1998
- Haplopeodes gomphrenae Valladares, 1998
- Haplopeodes kefi Steyskal, 1980
- Haplopeodes lopesi (Oliveira & Silva, 1954)
- Haplopeodes loprestii Eiseman & Lonsdale, 2021
- Haplopeodes lycivorus Valladares, 1998
- Haplopeodes minutus (Frost, 1924)
- Haplopeodes palliatus (Coquillett, 1902)
- Haplopeodes peruviana Korytkowski, 2014
- Haplopeodes punctiscutellatus Sasakawa, 1994
- Haplopeodes vogti Steyskal, 1980
