= Claude Charles Goureau =

French soldier and entomologist

Claude Charles Goureau (15 April 1790 in Pisy, Yonne – 6 February 1879 in Santigny) was a French soldier and entomologist.

In 1808, he entered L'École Polytechnique, training there until 1810. He then spent two years at L’école du génie, a military academy in Metz where he was awarded the rank of second lieutenant. During the siege of Magdeburg in 1812, he was promoted to the rank of captain, then, in 1814 to capitaine d’état-major and he also received the Légion d'honneur. He was in command of various fortifications, not only those of Paris in 1840, but also forts guarding the English Channel at Mayenne and Ille-et-Vilaine. In 1846, he became an Officer of the Legion of Honour.

After his retirement, in 1850, to Santigny, he became fully occupied with entomology. Goureau was especially devoted to the study of harmful (and later beneficial) insects. He became a member of the Société entomologique de France in 1835, becoming vice-president in 1842, 1844 and 1851, president in 1845 and 1852 and an honorary member in 1866. He is credited as being the first to recognize structural colors in the seemingly clear transparent wings of Drosophilidae in 1843.

== Works ==
Partial list

- Les Insectes nuisibles aux arbres fruitiers, aux plantes potagères, aux céréales et aux plantes fourragères (two volumes, V. Masson et fils, Paris, 1861–1865).
- Les Insectes nuisibles à l'homme, aux animaux et à l'économie domestiques (V. Masson et fils, Paris, 1866).
- Les Insectes nuisibles aux forêts et aux arbres d'avenues (V. Masson et fils, Paris, 1867).
- Les Insectes nuisibles aux arbustes et aux plantes de parterre (V. Masson et fils, Paris, 1869).
- Les insectes utiles à l'homme (V. Masson et fils, Paris, 1872).

== Sources ==
- Jean Gouillard (2004). Histoire des entomologistes français, 1750–1950. Édition entièrement revue et augmentée. Boubée (Paris) : 287 p.
- French Wikipedia Translation
