= Johann Heinrich Kaltenbach =

German naturalist and entomologist

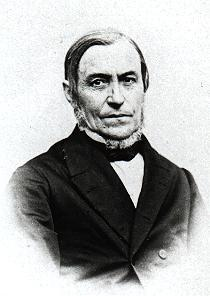
Johann Heinrich Kaltenbach

Johann Heinrich Kaltenbach (30 October 1807, Cologne – 20 May 1876, Aachen), was a German naturalist and entomologist mainly interested in pest species. He was a teacher in Aachen.

== Important works ==
- Monographie der Familien der Pflanzenläuse (Phytophthires); Aachen, In Commission der Roschütz'schen Buchandlung (1843) - Monograph on families of plant lice.
- "Die deutschen Phytophagen aus der Klasse der Insekten. Fortsetzung. Alphabetisches Verzeichniss der deutschen Pflanzengattungen (Buchstabe B)." Verh. Naturforsch. Ver. Preuss. Rheinl. Westfalens 15: 77–161.(1858).
- Die Pflanzenfeinde aus der Klasse der Insekten. Ein nach Pflanzenfamilien geordnetes Handbuch sammtlicher auf den einheimischen Pflanzen bisher beobachteten Insekten zum Gebrauch fhr Entomologen, Insektensammler, Botaniker, Land- und Forstwirthe und Gartenfreunde. Hoffman, Stuttgart. viii + 848 p.([1872]). Issued in 3 parts; though dated as 1874 on the cover, p. 1-288 were published in 1872.

In the field of botany, Kaltenbach was the author of Flora des Aachener Beckens (Flora of the Aachen basin), a book in which he identified almost 800 phanerogams.

== Sources ==
Osborn, H. 1952: A Brief History of Entomology Including Time of Demosthenes and Aristotle to Modern Times with over Five Hundred Portraits. Columbus, Ohio, The Spahr & Glenn Company: 1-303
