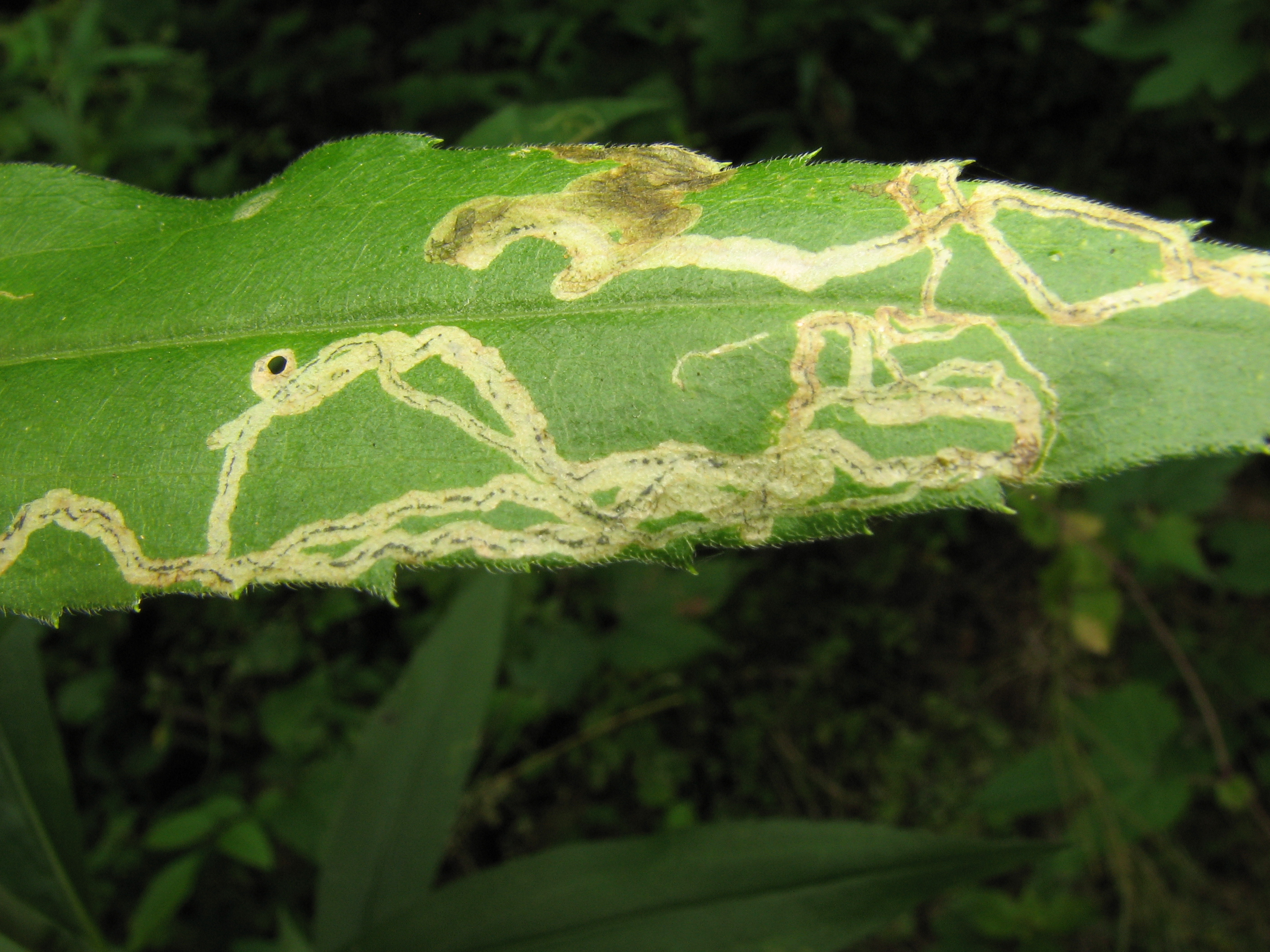
- Mines made in goldenrod leaf by Phytomyza larvae

Scientific classification
- Kingdom: Animalia
- Phylum: Arthropoda
- Class: Insecta
- Order: Diptera
- Family: Agromyzidae
- Subfamily: Phytomyzinae
- Genus: Phytomyza; Fallén, 1810

Type species
- Phytomyza flaveola Fallén, 1823

Synonyms
- Lonicera Meijere, 1924; Napomyia Schiner, 1868; Napomyza Curtis, 1837; Phythomyza Rondani, 1874; Phytomyia Haliday, 1833

= Phytomyza =

Genus of flies

Phytomyza is a genus of leaf miners in the family Agromyzidae.

== See also ==
- List of Phytomyza species
