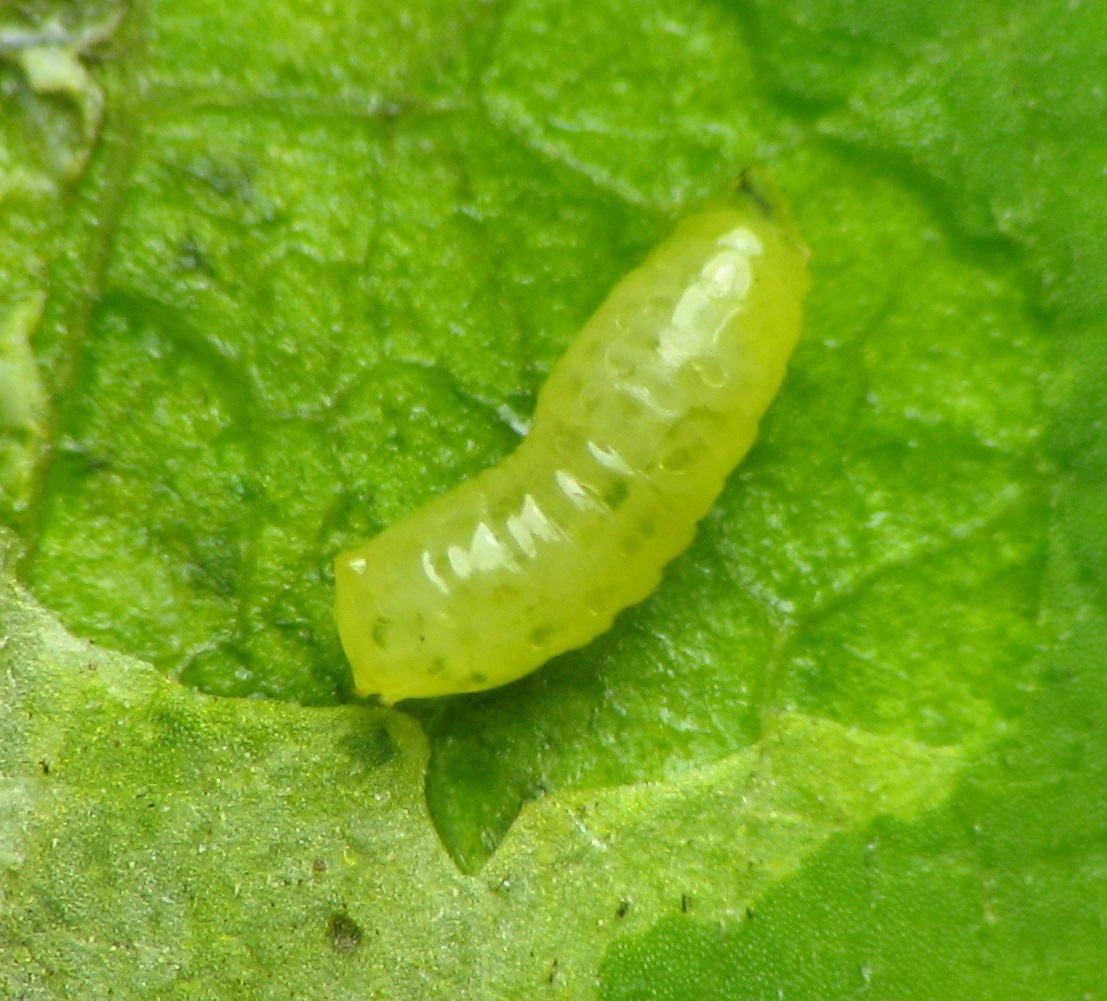
- Liriomyza asclepiadis larva

Scientific classification
- Kingdom: Animalia
- Phylum: Arthropoda
- Class: Insecta
- Order: Diptera
- Section: Schizophora
- Subsection: Acalyptratae
- Superfamily: Opomyzoidea
- Family: Agromyzidae
- Subfamily: Phytomyzinae

= Phytomyzinae =

Subfamily of flies

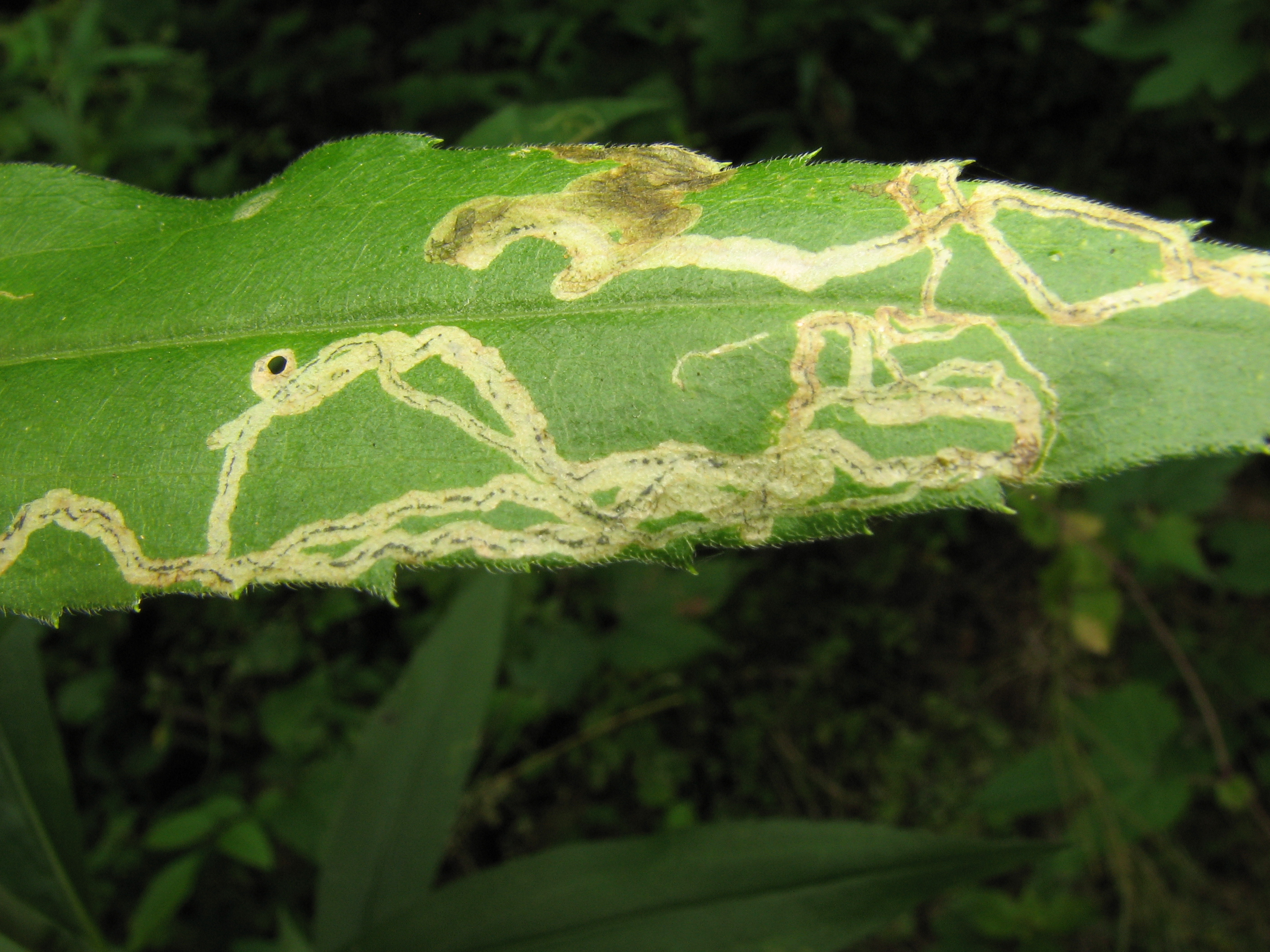
Mines in goldenrod leaf made by Phytomyza larvae

Phytomyzinae is a subfamily of flies in the family Agromyzidae. There are at least 520 described species in Phytomyzinae.

== Genera ==
- Amauromyza Hendel, 1931
- Aulagromyza Enderlein, 1936
- Calycomyza Hendel, 1931
- Cerodontha Rondani, 1861
- Chromatomyia Hardy, 1849
- Gymnophytomyza Hendel, 1936
- Liriomyza Mik, 1894
- Metopomyza Enderlein, 1936
- Napomyza Westwood, 1840
- Nemorimyza Frey, 1946
- Paraphytomyza Enderlein, 1936
- Phytobia Lioy, 1864
- Phytoliriomyza Hendel, 1931
- Phytomyza Fallén, 1810
- Pseudonapomyza Hendel, 1920
- Selachops Wahlberg, 1844
