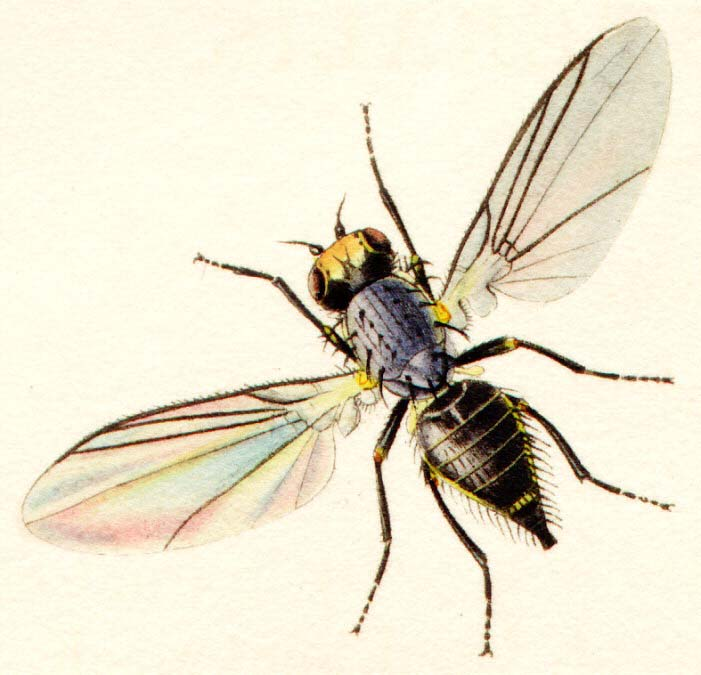
- Napomyza lateralis

Scientific classification
- Kingdom: Animalia
- Phylum: Arthropoda
- Clade: Pancrustacea
- Class: Insecta
- Order: Diptera
- Section: Schizophora
- Subsection: Acalyptratae
- Superfamily: Opomyzoidea
- Family: Agromyzidae; Fallén, 1823

Subfamilies
- Agromyzinae; Phytomyzinae

= Agromyzidae =

Leaf-miner flies

Family of flies

The Agromyzidae are a family of flies, commonly referred to as the leaf-miner flies for the feeding habits of their larvae, most of which are leaf miners on various plants. It includes roughly 2,500 species, they are small, some with wing length of 1 mm. The maximum size is 6.5 mm. Most species are in the range of 2 to 3 mm.

== General description ==
Adult agromyzids can be recognized by the distinctive sclerotization of the head. The upper part of the frons, above the ptilinal suture (known as the frontal vitta) is lightly sclerotized and lacks setae, while the lower part of the frons and the dorsal area of the head tends to be much more heavily sclerotized and setaceous. Thus, the frontal vitta often forms a distinctive patch on the head, different in colour and texture from the rest of the head. The compound eyes are usually oval and fairly small, although in some species, they are larger and more circular.

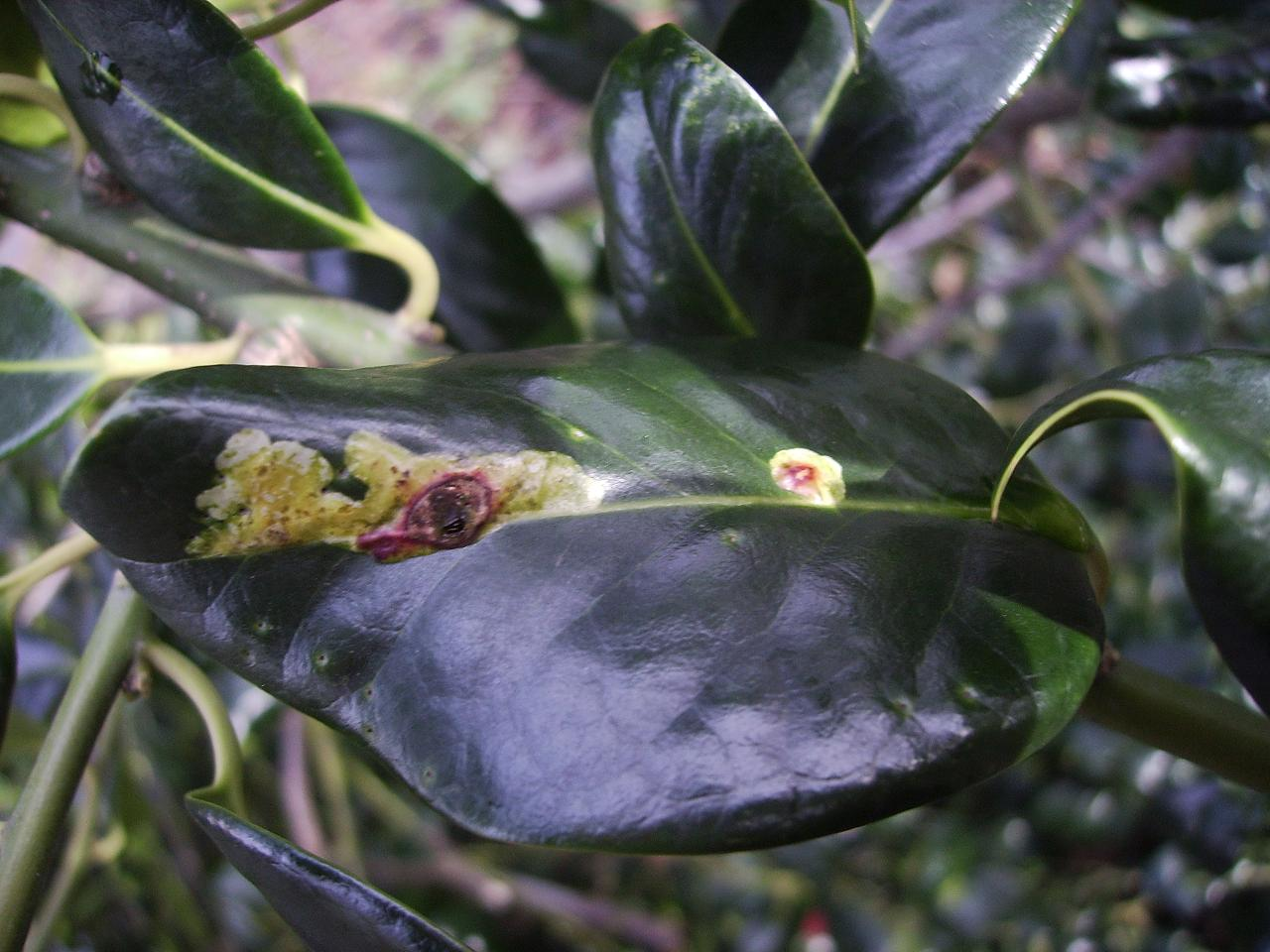
Larval mines of European holly leaf miner, Phytomyza ilicis

The wings are usually hyaline, although those of a few tropical species have darker markings. A few species, including all Agromyza spp., are capable of stridulation, possessing a "file" on the first abdominal segment and a "scraper" on the hind femur. The family Agromyzidae is commonly referred to as the leaf-miner flies, for the feeding habits of their larvae, most of which are leaf miners on various plants.

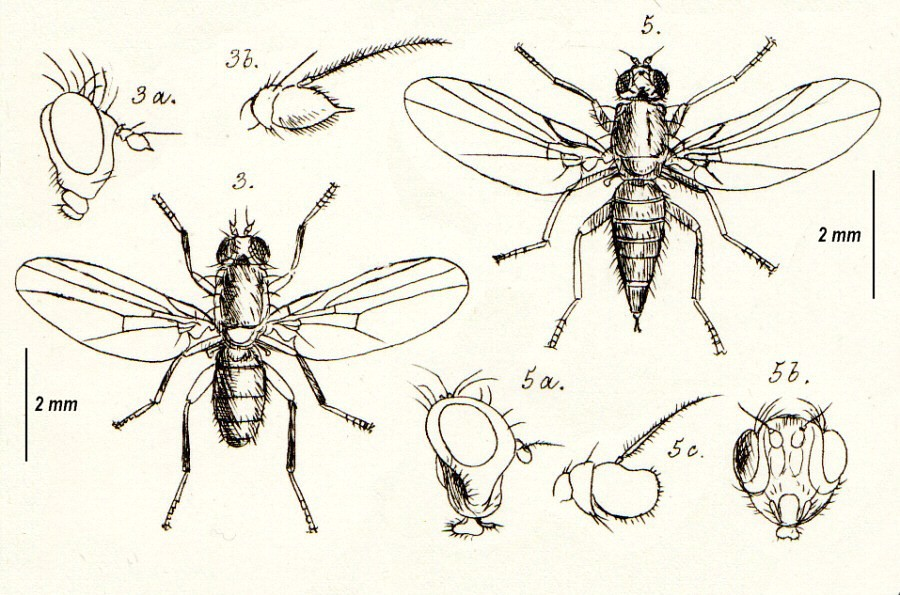
Figure 3 Cerodontha denticornis, 3a head lateral, 3b antenna, and figure 5 Phytomyza affinis 5a head lateral, 5b face, 5c antenna

== Technical description ==
These are small, sometimes minute, flies, at most 0.9 to 6.0 mm in length. The body is usually short, and the thorax has a rectangular profile, with a well-developed humeral callus. The abdomen is broad and the legs are short. The thorax and abdomen are often light grey, rarely dark, but may be yellow, green, blue-green, and variably coppery or metallic. The wings are equal in length to the body or slightly longer. Wings have the lower calypter much reduced or absent. The chaetotaxy is well developed, especially on the head. The postvertical orbital bristles on the head are always present and divergent, inner and outer vertical bristles on the head are well developed. They have ocellar bristles, frontal bristles (two to eight pairs of frontal bristles, the lower one to three pairs curve inward, the other pairs backward), vibrissae (in some cases weakly developed), and oral bristles are always present. Interfrontal bristles are absent, but interfrontal setulae are sometimes present. The basal segment of the antennae is very short; the second antennal segment is not grooved. The third antennal segment is always large, usually round (not elongated but sometimes with a sharp point) and usually with swollen, and the almost bare or pubescent arista never is plumose. The face in lateral view is not deeply excavated between the antennae and the edge of the mouth. The ptilinal suture is clearly defined. The mouthparts are functional. The proboscis is usually short and thick, rarely elongated and geniculated (Ophiomyia). The maxillary palps are single-segmented and porrect. The thorax is without a continuous dorsal suture and without well-defined posterior calli. The thorax has well-developed dorsocentral bristles, posterior bristles, supra-alar bristles, and acrostichal and intra-alar bristles. The scutellum has two to four bristles. On each side of the thorax is a humeral bristle and one or two notopleural bristles. In describing the bristles of the thorax (dorsocentral bristles and acrostichal), a formula is used in which the first number indicates the postsutural ones, and the second number, following a plus (+) or minus (−) sign the presutural. A few bristles are on the legs, but bristles on tibia 2, are of taxonomic significance. Tibiae are without a dorsal preapical bristle. Hind tibiae are without strong bristles in the basal 4/5. The front femora are without a conspicuous spine beneath. The wing venation usually exhibits first and second basal, anal, and discal cells but may lack one or more of the cells. Wings have a discal cell, or are without a discal cell; without a subapical cell. The anal cell is very short and closed. The costa has one break which is at the end of the subcosta. The subcosta is apparent (faint) and joins vein 1 well short of the costa, or terminates before it (vein Sc is complete or incomplete, apically ending in vein R1 (Agromyzinae) or separate from vein R1, but reduced to a fold that may or may not reach the costa (Phytomyzinae)); . Wing vein 4 extends far beyond the end of the first basal cell. Wing vein 6 is present, falling short of the wing margin. Wing venation is shown in the gallery.

The abdomen is moderately long and consists of six segments and with a coating of short pubescence well-developed at some places. The female has an elongated telescopic ovipositor, which in the resting position is retracted into the elongated tergite 7, often called the ovipositor. (Female with oviscape, nonretractable basal segment of the ovipositor).

Agromyzinae wing veins

Phytomyzinae wing veins (with discal cell)

Phytomyzinae wing veins (without discal cell)

The egg is oval-shaped, white or yellowish. The larva is apodous, cylindrical and tapering at both ends. The length of the last instar larva is, as a rule, in the order of 2–3 mm. The tracheal system is metapneustic in the first instar early age and amphipneustic in the subsequent stages. The pupa is variable, from barrel shaped, to a more elongated shape. The outer surface can segmentation and is more or less smooth or wrinkled. The color varies from black to brown to yellowish white.

== Biology ==
Melanagromyza sp. ovipositing on Anthriscus sylvestris

Agromyzidae larvae are phytophagous, feeding as leaf miners, less frequently as stem miners or stem borers. A few live on developing seeds, or produce galls. Sometimes larvae is found in roots or under bark. The biology of many species is as yet unknown. There is a high degree of host specificity, an example being Phytomyza ilicis, the European holly leaf miner that feeds on no other species. Some Agromyzidae are quarantine species in many countries. Liriomyza huidobrensis, Liriomyza sativae and Liriomyza trifolii are examples.

A number of species attack plants of agricultural or ornamental value, so are considered pests. These insects are very important to agronomy by the direct damage that they cause, particularly on young plants, the leaf of which may, for example, be completely destroyed. By their nutritional bites females of some species are able to inoculate pathogenic fungi, or to transmit viruses. About 10% of the species of Agromyzidae are considered pests. The most important pest genera are Agromyza, Melanagromyza, Ophiomyia, Liriomyza, Napomyza and Phytomyza.

For examples of pest species see Asparagus miner (Ophiomyia simplex), Chromatomyia horticola, Serpentine leaf miner (Liriomyza brassicae), and American serpentine leaf miner (Liriomyza trifolii).

Some 110 species are known to occur on cultivated plants. A number of species are of particular importance, especially Liriomyza and Ophiomyia species. Larvae of species in the genera Liriomyza and Phytomyza are extremely polyphagous (they attack many different species of plants).

A long imaginal aestivation and hibernation period is an uncommon overwintering strategy among agromyzid flies.

The shape of the mine is often characteristic of the species and therefore useful for identification. For some of the serpentine leaf miners it is possible to use the mine to indicate the instar of the animal that made it, and in some cases its cause of death. Polytene chromosomes can be isolated from some agromyzid larvae. Adults occur in a variety of habitats, depending on the larval host plants.

== Identification ==
Morphological similarity makes identification difficult, and DNA barcoding is increasingly used to identify species.

== Genera ==
List of genera according to Catalogue of Life:

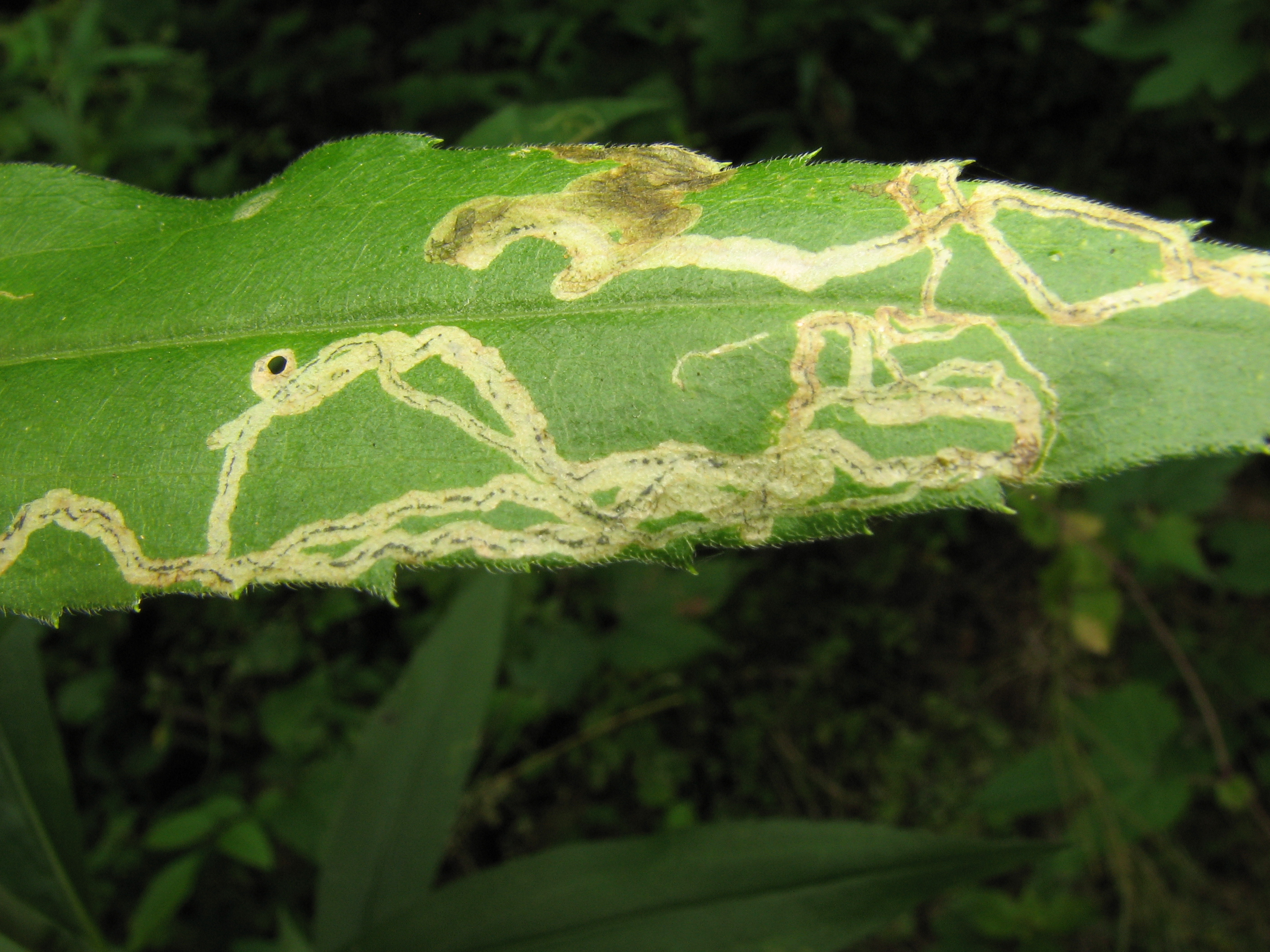
Mines of Phytomyza sp. on leaf of Solidago.

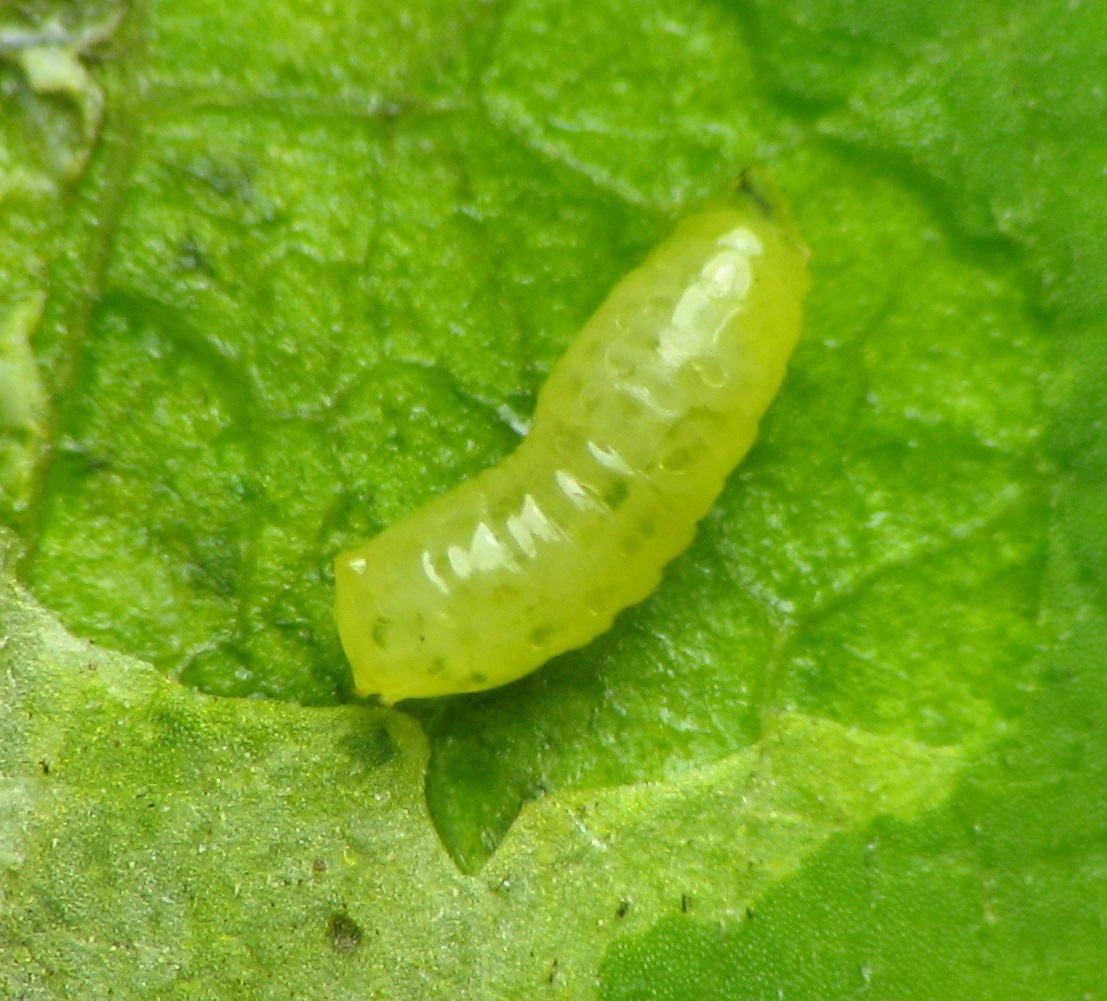
Larva of Liriomyza asclepiadis on leaf of Asclepias.

- Agromyza
- Amauromyza
- Aulagromyza
- Calycomyza
- Cerodontha
- Chromatomyia
- Euhexomyza Lonsdale, 2014
- Gymnophytomyza
- Haplopeodes
- Indonapomyza
- Japanagromyza
- Kleinschmidtimyia
- Liriomyza
- Melanagromyza
- Metopomyza
- Napomyza
- Nemorimyza
- Ophiomyia
- Penetagromyza
- Phytobia
- Phytoliriomyza
- Phytomyza
- Pseudoliriomyza
- Pseudonapomyza
- Ptochomyza
- Selachops
- Tropicomyia
- Xeniomyza

== Phylogeny ==
- Opomyzoidea
  - Clusioinea
    Clusiidae
  - - Agromyzoinea
      - Odiniidae
      - - Fergusoninidae
        - Agromyzidae
    - - Opomyzoinea
        Opomyzidae+Anthomyzidae
      - Asteioinea

== See also ==
- Liriomyza sativae - Vegetable leaf miner
- Phytobia betulae
- Phytobia optabilis
