= List of Liriomyza species =

This is a list of 413 species in Liriomyza, a genus of leaf miner flies in the family Agromyzidae.

== Liriomyza species ==
- Liriomyza abnormis Spencer, 1981
- Liriomyza acrostichalis Papp, 2017
- Liriomyza aculeolata Zlobin, 2002
- Liriomyza admiranda Spencer, 1981
- Liriomyza aestiva Zlobin, 1997
- Liriomyza agrios Lonsdale, 2017
- Liriomyza alaskensis Spencer, 1969
- Liriomyza albispina Lonsdale, 2017
- Liriomyza allia (Frost, 1943)
- Liriomyza alticola Singh & Ipe, 1973
- Liriomyza alyssi (Hering, 1960)
- Liriomyza amarellae Hering, 1963
- Liriomyza americana (Schiner, 1868)
- Liriomyza amoena (Meigen, 1830)
- Liriomyza anaphalidis Sasakawa, 1961
- Liriomyza anatolis Lonsdale, 2017
- Liriomyza andina (Malloch, 1934)
- Liriomyza andryalae Hering, 1927
- Liriomyza angulicornis (Malloch, 1918)
- Liriomyza anthemidis Pakalniškis, 1994
- Liriomyza antipoda Harrison, 1976
- Liriomyza antiquaria Spencer, 1977
- Liriomyza aphila Lonsdale, 2017
- Liriomyza apilaca Lonsdale, 2017
- Liriomyza aposeridis Beiger, 1972
- Liriomyza approximata (Hendel, 1920)
- Liriomyza apsara Singh & Ipe, 1973
- Liriomyza aquapolis Lonsdale, 2017
- Liriomyza archboldi Frost, 1962
- Liriomyza arctii Spencer, 1969
- Liriomyza arenarium Lonsdale, 2017
- Liriomyza arida Korytkowski, 2014
- Liriomyza arnaudi Spencer, 1981
- Liriomyza artemisiae Spencer, 1981
- Liriomyza artemisicola Meijere, 1924
- Liriomyza asclepiadis Spencer, 1969
- Liriomyza asphodeli Spencer, 1957
- Liriomyza assimilis (Malloch, 1918)
- Liriomyza asteriphila Zlobin, 1996
- Liriomyza asteris Hering, 1928
- Liriomyza asterivora Sasakawa, 1956
- Liriomyza aterrima Pakalniškis, 1998
- Liriomyza atrassimilis Lonsdale, 2017
- Liriomyza avicenniae Martinez & Etienne, 2002
- Liriomyza baccharidis Spencer, 1963
- Liriomyza balcanica (Strobl, 1898)
- Liriomyza baptisiae (Frost, 1931)
- Liriomyza barrocoloradensis (Frost, 1936)
- Liriomyza bartaki Cerný, 2007
- Liriomyza beata Hendel, 1931
- Liriomyza beatitae Tschirnhaus, 2017
- Liriomyza belcanicoides Sehgal, 1971
- Liriomyza bella Spencer, 1981
- Liriomyza bellissima (Spencer, 1969)
- Liriomyza bessarabica Hering, 1941
- Liriomyza bharati Singh & Ipe, 1973
- Liriomyza bicolumbis Lonsdale, 2017
- Liriomyza biensis Boucher, 2014
- Liriomyza biformata (Becker, 1919)
- Liriomyza bifurcata Sehgal, 1971
- Liriomyza bispinosa Sasakawa, 1992
- Liriomyza bispinula Lonsdale, 2011
- Liriomyza bituberculata Sasakawa, 1994
- Liriomyza blechi Spencer, 1973
- Liriomyza bogotensis Arevalo, 1993
- Liriomyza borealis (Malloch, 1913)
- Liriomyza brassicae (Riley, 1885)
- Liriomyza braziliae Spencer, 1963
- Liriomyza brunnifrons (Malloch, 1914)
- Liriomyza bryoniae (Kaltenbach, 1858)
- Liriomyza buhri Hering, 1937
- Liriomyza bulbata Hendel, 1931
- Liriomyza bulbipalpis Tschirnhaus, 1992
- Liriomyza bulgarica Beiger, 1979
- Liriomyza bulnesiae Spencer, 1963
- Liriomyza caesalpiniae Valladares, 1991
- Liriomyza californiensis Spencer, 1981
- Liriomyza canescens Spencer, 1976
- Liriomyza cannabis Hendel, 1931
- Liriomyza cardamines Sasakawa, 1954
- Liriomyza cassiniae Spencer, 1977
- Liriomyza caulophaga (Kleinschmidt, 1960)
- Liriomyza cekalovici Spencer, 1982
- Liriomyza centaureae Hering, 1927
- Liriomyza cepae (Hering, 1927)
- Liriomyza certosa Spencer, 1961
- Liriomyza cestri Spencer, 1982
- Liriomyza charada Lonsdale, 2017
- Liriomyza chemsaki Spencer, 1981
- Liriomyza chilensis (Malloch, 1934)
- Liriomyza chinensis (Kato, 1949)
- Liriomyza chlamydata (Melander, 1913)
- Liriomyza cicerina (Rondani, 1874)
- Liriomyza cilicornis Hendel, 1931
- Liriomyza cirriformis Arevalo, 1993
- Liriomyza citreifemorata (Watt, 1923)
- Liriomyza clarae Beiger, 1972
- Liriomyza clianthi (Watt, 1923)
- Liriomyza cocculi (Frick, 1953)
- Liriomyza colombiella Spencer, 1984
- Liriomyza commelinae (Frost, 1931)
- Liriomyza concepcionensis Spencer, 1982
- Liriomyza conclavis Lonsdale, 2011
- Liriomyza congesta (Becker, 1903)
- Liriomyza cordillerana Sehgal, 1968
- Liriomyza coronillae Pakalniškis, 1994
- Liriomyza cortesi Spencer, 1982
- Liriomyza costaricana Spencer, 1983
- Liriomyza cracentis Lonsdale, 2017
- Liriomyza craspediae Spencer, 1976
- Liriomyza cruciferarum Hering, 1927
- Liriomyza cunicularia Lonsdale, 2011
- Liriomyza cyclaminis Süss, 1987
- Liriomyza debilis Sasakawa, 1956
- Liriomyza decempunctata Sasakawa, 1961
- Liriomyza deceptiva (Malloch, 1918)
- Liriomyza deficiens Hendel, 1931
- Liriomyza demeijerei Hering, 1930
- Liriomyza dendranthemae Nowakowski, 1975
- Liriomyza denudata Spencer, 1981
- Liriomyza dianthicola (Venturi, 1949)
- Liriomyza diminuella (Spencer, 1961)
- Liriomyza discalis (Malloch, 1913)
- Liriomyza domestica Garg, 1971
- Liriomyza dracunculi Hering, 1932
- Liriomyza eboni Spencer, 1969
- Liriomyza edmontonensis Spencer, 1969
- Liriomyza electa Spencer, 1977
- Liriomyza elevaster Lonsdale, 2017
- Liriomyza elevata Spencer, 1986
- Liriomyza elquensis Spencer, 1982
- Liriomyza emaciata Lonsdale, 2017
- Liriomyza emiliae Séguy, 1951
- Liriomyza endiviae Hering, 1955
- Liriomyza equiseti Meijere, 1924
- Liriomyza erucifolii Meijere, 1943
- Liriomyza eupatoriana Spencer, 1954
- Liriomyza eupatoriella Spencer, 1986
- Liriomyza eupatorii (Kaltenbach, 1874)
- Liriomyza euphorbiae Martinez & Sobhian, 1999
- Liriomyza euphorbiana Hendel, 1931
- Liriomyza euphorbivora Eiseman & Lonsdale, 2021
- Liriomyza europaea Zlobin, 2002
- Liriomyza fasciola (Meigen, 1838)
- Liriomyza fasciventris (Becker, 1907)
- Liriomyza flavalis Spencer, 1959
- Liriomyza flaveola (Fallén, 1823)
- Liriomyza flaviantennata (Spencer, 1966)
- Liriomyza flavicola Spencer, 1981
- Liriomyza flavocentralis (Watt, 1923)
- Liriomyza flavolateralis (Watt, 1923)
- Liriomyza flavonigra (Coquillett, 1902)
- Liriomyza flavopicta Hendel, 1931
- Liriomyza freidbergi Spencer, 1974
- Liriomyza freyella Spencer, 1976
- Liriomyza frickella Spencer, 1981
- Liriomyza fricki Spencer, 1965
- Liriomyza frigida Spencer, 1981
- Liriomyza frommeri Spencer, 1981
- Liriomyza frontella (Malloch, 1914)
- Liriomyza fumeola Lonsdale, 2017
- Liriomyza furva Spencer, 1976
- Liriomyza galiivora (Spencer, 1969)
- Liriomyza gayi (Porter, 1915)
- Liriomyza geniculata Sasakawa, 1992
- Liriomyza gibsoni Lonsdale, 2017
- Liriomyza globulariae Hendel, 1931
- Liriomyza graminacea Spencer, 1981
- Liriomyza graminivora Hering, 1949
- Liriomyza grandis Spencer, 1963
- Liriomyza griffithsi Lonsdale, 2017
- Liriomyza groschkei Hering, 1956
- Liriomyza guadeloupensis Martinez, 1992
- Liriomyza gudmanni Hering, 1928
- Liriomyza hampsteadensis Spencer, 1971
- Liriomyza haploneura Hendel, 1931
- Liriomyza hebae Spencer, 1976
- Liriomyza helenii Spencer, 1981
- Liriomyza helianthi Spencer, 1981
- Liriomyza helichrysi Spencer, 1963
- Liriomyza helichrysivora Spencer, 1965
- Liriomyza hemerocallis Iwasaki, 1993
- Liriomyza heringi Nowakowski, 1961
- Liriomyza herrerai Spencer, 1984
- Liriomyza hieracii (Kaltenbach, 1862)
- Liriomyza hieracivora Spencer, 1971
- Liriomyza hilairensis Lonsdale, 2017
- Liriomyza himalayana Garg, 1971
- Liriomyza homeri Spencer, 1976
- Liriomyza hordei Spencer, 1984
- Liriomyza huidobrensis (Blanchard, 1926)
- Liriomyza hypopolymnia Eiseman & Lonsdale, 2021
- Liriomyza impolita Spencer, 1977
- Liriomyza imurai Sasakawa, 1993
- Liriomyza inca Korytkowski, 2014
- Liriomyza infuscata Hering, 1926
- Liriomyza inopinata Spencer, 1977
- Liriomyza insignis Spencer, 1963
- Liriomyza inti Korytkowski, 2014
- Liriomyza intonsa Spencer, 1976
- Liriomyza irazui Spencer, 1983
- Liriomyza irwini Sasakawa, 1992
- Liriomyza ivanauskasi Pakalniškis, 1998
- Liriomyza ivorcutleri Eiseman & Lonsdale, 2018
- Liriomyza jezoensis Sasakawa, 1961
- Liriomyza katoi Sasakawa, 1961
- Liriomyza kenti Spencer, 1969
- Liriomyza kerteszi Papp, 2017
- Liriomyza khekhtsirica Zlobin, 2002
- Liriomyza kleiniae Hering, 1927
- Liriomyza korytkowskii Tschirnhaus, 2017
- Liriomyza kovalevi Zlobin, 1998
- Liriomyza kumaonensis Garg, 1971
- Liriomyza kuscheli Spencer, 1964
- Liriomyza labanoro Pakalniškis, 1992
- Liriomyza lacertella (Rondani, 1875)
- Liriomyza lacunosa (Spencer, 1977)
- Liriomyza langei Frick, 1951
- Liriomyza languida Spencer, 1977
- Liriomyza lathyri Sehgal, 1971
- Liriomyza lathyroides (Spencer, 1981)
- Liriomyza latigenis (Hendel, 1920)
- Liriomyza latipalpis Hendel, 1920
- Liriomyza lepida Spencer, 1977
- Liriomyza lepidii Harrison, 1976
- Liriomyza lesinensis Hering, 1967
- Liriomyza lima (Melander, 1913)
- Liriomyza limopsis Lonsdale, 2017
- Liriomyza limpida Hering, 1933
- Liriomyza litorea Shiao & Wu, 1995
- Liriomyza lituanica Pakalniškis, 1992
- Liriomyza lolii Spencer, 1982
- Liriomyza lupinella Spencer, 1981
- Liriomyza lupini Spencer, 1981
- Liriomyza lupiniphaga Spencer, 1981
- Liriomyza lusatiensis Hering, 1956
- Liriomyza lutea (Meigen, 1830)
- Liriomyza maai Sasakawa, 2008
- Liriomyza madridensis Spencer, 1984
- Liriomyza maipuensis Sasakawa, 1994
- Liriomyza manii Singh & Ipe, 1973
- Liriomyza manni Spencer, 1985
- Liriomyza marginalis (Malloch, 1913)
- Liriomyza mariaecamilae Arevalo, 1993
- Liriomyza mediterranea Hendel, 1931
- Liriomyza melantherae Spencer, 1959
- Liriomyza melitensis Spencer, 1973
- Liriomyza menthavora Arevalo, 1993
- Liriomyza meracula Spencer, 1977
- Liriomyza merga Lonsdale, 2011
- Liriomyza mesocanadensis Lonsdale, 2017
- Liriomyza michaeli Papp, 2017
- Liriomyza microglossae Spencer, 1963
- Liriomyza mikaniopsidis Spencer, 1961
- Liriomyza mikanivora Spencer, 1973
- Liriomyza minor Spencer, 1981
- Liriomyza mirifica Spencer, 1963
- Liriomyza miserabilis Lonsdale, 2011
- Liriomyza monoensis Spencer, 1981
- Liriomyza montana Sehgal, 1968
- Liriomyza montella Spencer, 1986
- Liriomyza montis Spencer, 1986
- Liriomyza montserratensis Spencer, 1984
- Liriomyza mosquerensis Arevalo, 1993
- Liriomyza mosselensis Spencer, 1965
- Liriomyza muranica Cerný, 2012
- Liriomyza myrsinitae Hering, 1957
- Liriomyza mystica Boucher & Nishida, 2014
- Liriomyza nana Spencer, 1965
- Liriomyza nares Boucher & Wheeler, 2001
- Liriomyza navarinensis Spencer, 1982
- Liriomyza nebulosa Lonsdale, 2011
- Liriomyza nietzkei Spencer, 1973
- Liriomyza nigra Spencer, 1984
- Liriomyza nigriscutellata Spencer, 1981
- Liriomyza nigrissima Spencer, 1981
- Liriomyza nordica Spencer, 1969
- Liriomyza novissima Spencer, 1960
- Liriomyza obliqua Hendel, 1931
- Liriomyza obscurata Spencer, 1963
- Liriomyza occipitalis Hendel, 1931
- Liriomyza okrae Sousa & Couri, 2018
- Liriomyza oldenbergi Hering, 1933
- Liriomyza oleariae Spencer, 1976
- Liriomyza oleariana Spencer, 1977
- Liriomyza orbona (Meigen, 1830)
- Liriomyza orilliensis Spencer, 1969
- Liriomyza ornatipennata Korytkowski, 2014
- Liriomyza ortizi Korytkowski, 2014
- Liriomyza pagana (Malloch, 1934)
- Liriomyza palauensis Spencer, 1963
- Liriomyza parabella Lonsdale, 2011
- Liriomyza paradigma Hering, 1936
- Liriomyza parapuella Papp, 2017
- Liriomyza pascuum (Meigen, 1838)
- Liriomyza patagonica (Malloch, 1934)
- Liriomyza patagoniensis Spencer, 1982
- Liriomyza paumensis Spencer, 1981
- Liriomyza pechumani Spencer, 1986
- Liriomyza pectinimentula Sasakawa, 2005
- Liriomyza peleensis Spencer, 1969
- Liriomyza penella Spencer, 1982
- Liriomyza penita Spencer, 1976
- Liriomyza pereziae Hering, 1963
- Liriomyza periorbita Hendel, 1931
- Liriomyza persica Griffiths, 1963
- Liriomyza peruensis Zlobin, 2001
- Liriomyza peruviana Korytkowski, 2014
- Liriomyza peullae (Malloch, 1934)
- Liriomyza philadelphi Sasakawa, 1961
- Liriomyza philadelphivora Spencer, 1969
- Liriomyza phryne Hendel, 1931
- Liriomyza phyllodes Lonsdale, 2011
- Liriomyza pictella (Thomson, 1869)
- Liriomyza pilicornis Lonsdale, 2017
- Liriomyza pilosa Spencer, 1969
- Liriomyza pirinensis Cerný, Barták, Kubík & Vála, 2022
- Liriomyza pisivora Hering, 1957
- Liriomyza pistilla Lonsdale, 2017
- Liriomyza plantaginella Spencer, 1976
- Liriomyza politella (Malloch, 1934)
- Liriomyza polygalae Hering, 1927
- Liriomyza praeusta Sasakawa, 1961
- Liriomyza primitiva Spencer, 1977
- Liriomyza projecta Lonsdale, 2011
- Liriomyza prompta Boucher & Nishida, 2014
- Liriomyza prostrata (Sasakawa, 1963)
- Liriomyza pseudopygmina (Hering, 1933)
- Liriomyza ptarmicae Meijere, 1925
- Liriomyza puella (Meigen, 1830)
- Liriomyza pulchella Sasakawa, 1961
- Liriomyza pulloides Spencer, 1986
- Liriomyza pusilla (Meigen, 1830)
- Liriomyza pusio (Meigen, 1830)
- Liriomyza quadrisetosa (Malloch, 1913)
- Liriomyza quichuana Korytkowski, 2014
- Liriomyza quiquevittata Sasakawa, 1994
- Liriomyza ranunculoides Spencer, 1969
- Liriomyza richteri Hering, 1927
- Liriomyza rigaudensis Lonsdale, 2017
- Liriomyza robustae Spencer, 1984
- Liriomyza rotundiphallus Papp, 2017
- Liriomyza sabaziae Spencer, 1963
- Liriomyza salpingion Lonsdale, 2011
- Liriomyza santafecina Arevalo, 1993
- Liriomyza sativae Blanchard, 1938
- Liriomyza scaevolae Spencer, 1977
- Liriomyza schlingeri Spencer, 1981
- Liriomyza schmidti (Aldrich, 1929)
- Liriomyza schmidtiana Spencer, 1973
- Liriomyza schwabei Spencer, 1963
- Liriomyza scorzonerae Rydén, 1951
- Liriomyza securicornis Sasakawa, 1961
- Liriomyza seneciella Spencer, 1963
- Liriomyza senecionivora Sehgal, 1971
- Liriomyza septentrionalis Sehgal, 1968
- Liriomyza serrana Korytkowski, 2014
- Liriomyza serriolae Hering, 1955
- Liriomyza setistylus Papp, 2017
- Liriomyza similis Spencer, 1981
- Liriomyza simulator (Malloch, 1934)
- Liriomyza singula Spencer, 1969
- Liriomyza sinuata Sehgal, 1971
- Liriomyza smilacinae Spencer, 1969
- Liriomyza socialis Spencer, 1969
- Liriomyza solanita Spencer, 1963
- Liriomyza solanivora Spencer, 1973
- Liriomyza solivaga Spencer, 1971
- Liriomyza sonchi Hendel, 1931
- Liriomyza soror Hendel, 1931
- Liriomyza sorosis (Williston, 1896)
- Liriomyza specifica Spencer, 1981
- Liriomyza spencerella Valladares, 1985
- Liriomyza splendens Spencer, 1986
- Liriomyza stachyos Spencer, 1981
- Liriomyza strigata (Meigen, 1830)
- Liriomyza strigosa Spencer, 1963
- Liriomyza strumosa Sasakawa, 2008
- Liriomyza subachoquensis Arevalo, 1993
- Liriomyza subartemisicola Frey, 1945
- Liriomyza subasclepiadis Spencer, 1986
- Liriomyza subflavopicta Sasakawa, 1998
- Liriomyza subinsignis Spencer, 1982
- Liriomyza subobliqua Hendel, 1931
- Liriomyza subpusilla (Malloch, 1914)
- Liriomyza subsativae Sasakawa, 1992
- Liriomyza subvirgo Rohdendorf-Holmanova, 1960
- Liriomyza suecica Rydén, 1956
- Liriomyza sylvatica Sehgal, 1971
- Liriomyza synedrellae Martinez, 1992
- Liriomyza tanaceti Meijere, 1924
- Liriomyza taraxaci Hering, 1927
- Liriomyza taraxanox Lonsdale, 2017
- Liriomyza taraxanuda Lonsdale, 2017
- Liriomyza taurica Zlobin, 2002
- Liriomyza temperata Spencer, 1986
- Liriomyza tenera Spencer, 1977
- Liriomyza tequendamae (Spencer, 1963)
- Liriomyza tetrachaeta Zlobin, 2002
- Liriomyza texella Spencer, 1986
- Liriomyza thalhammeri Cerný, 2017
- Liriomyza thalictri Hering, 1932
- Liriomyza thesii Hering, 1924
- Liriomyza tibidabensis Spencer, 1966
- Liriomyza togata (Melander, 1913)
- Liriomyza tragopogonis Meijere, 1928
- Liriomyza tricornis Lonsdale, 2011
- Liriomyza trifoliearum Spencer, 1973
- Liriomyza trifolii (Burgess, 1880)
- Liriomyza trivialis Spencer, 1973
- Liriomyza trixivora Lonsdale, 2011
- Liriomyza tropaeoli Guglya, 2021
- Liriomyza tryssos Lonsdale, 2017
- Liriomyza tubifer (Melander, 1913)
- Liriomyza tubula Spencer, 1981
- Liriomyza tumbrensis Spencer, 1982
- Liriomyza umbilici Hering, 1927
- Liriomyza umbrina (Watt, 1923)
- Liriomyza umbrinella (Watt, 1923)
- Liriomyza umbrosa (Watt, 1923)
- Liriomyza undulatimentula Sasakawa, 1992
- Liriomyza urophorina Mik, 1894
- Liriomyza urticae (Watt, 1924)
- Liriomyza valerianae Hendel, 1932
- Liriomyza valerianellae Hering, 1957
- Liriomyza valerianivora Eiseman & Lonsdale, 2018
- Liriomyza valladaresae Carvalho-Filho, Almeida & Esposito, 2016
- Liriomyza variata (Malloch, 1913)
- Liriomyza veluta Spencer, 1969
- Liriomyza venegasiae Spencer, 1981
- Liriomyza venturensis Spencer, 1981
- Liriomyza vicina Spencer, 1976
- Liriomyza vicunella Spencer, 1982
- Liriomyza violicaulis Hering, 1962
- Liriomyza violiphaga Hendel, 1932
- Liriomyza violivora (Spencer, 1986)
- Liriomyza virgo (Zetterstedt, 1837)
- Liriomyza virgula Frey, 1946
- Liriomyza viticola (Sasakawa, 1972)
- Liriomyza vitrimentula Sasakawa, 1994
- Liriomyza volatilis Spencer, 1965
- Liriomyza vulcanica Zlobin, 1997
- Liriomyza wachtlii Hendel, 1920
- Liriomyza wahlenbergiae Spencer, 1976
- Liriomyza watti Spencer, 1976
- Liriomyza xanthocera (Czerny, 1909)
- Liriomyza yasumatsui Sasakawa, 1972
- Liriomyza zinniae Spencer, 1981
