= Serpentine leaf miner =

Scientific classification
- Kingdom: Animalia
- Phylum: Arthropoda
- Class: Insecta
- Order: Diptera
- Family: Agromyzidae
- Subfamily: Phytomyzinae
- Genus: Liriomyza
- Species: L. brassicae

Binomial name
- Liriomyza brassicae (Riley, 1885)

Synonyms
- Liriomyza hawaiiensis Frick, 1952; Liriomyza ornephila Garg, 1971; Oscinis brassicae Riley, 1885; Phytomyza mitis Curran, 1931

Species of fly

The serpentine leaf miner is the larva of a fly, Liriomyza brassicae, in the family Agromyzidae, the leaf miner flies. It mines wild and cultivated plants, such as cabbage, broccoli, cauliflower and Chinese broccoli.

It is distributed in the Pacific, Africa, and the Americas.

The life cycle of the fly is up to 21 days. It lays eggs in the leaf epidermis of host plants. Larvae hatch within four days. They are yellow or green and have three instars. It emerges from the pupa as an adult, a gray fly with black and yellow spots.

The American serpentine leafminer (Liriomyza trifolii) is a closely related species, and Liriomyza huidobrensis is also known as the serpentine leafminer. Another member of the genus, Liriomyza commelinae occurs widely in the neotropics and pupates within the mine. It feeds mainly on plants within the genus Commelina.

== In popular culture ==
The Wire song Outdoor Miner was inspired by co-writer Graham Lewis's fascination with this insect and details its life cycle.
