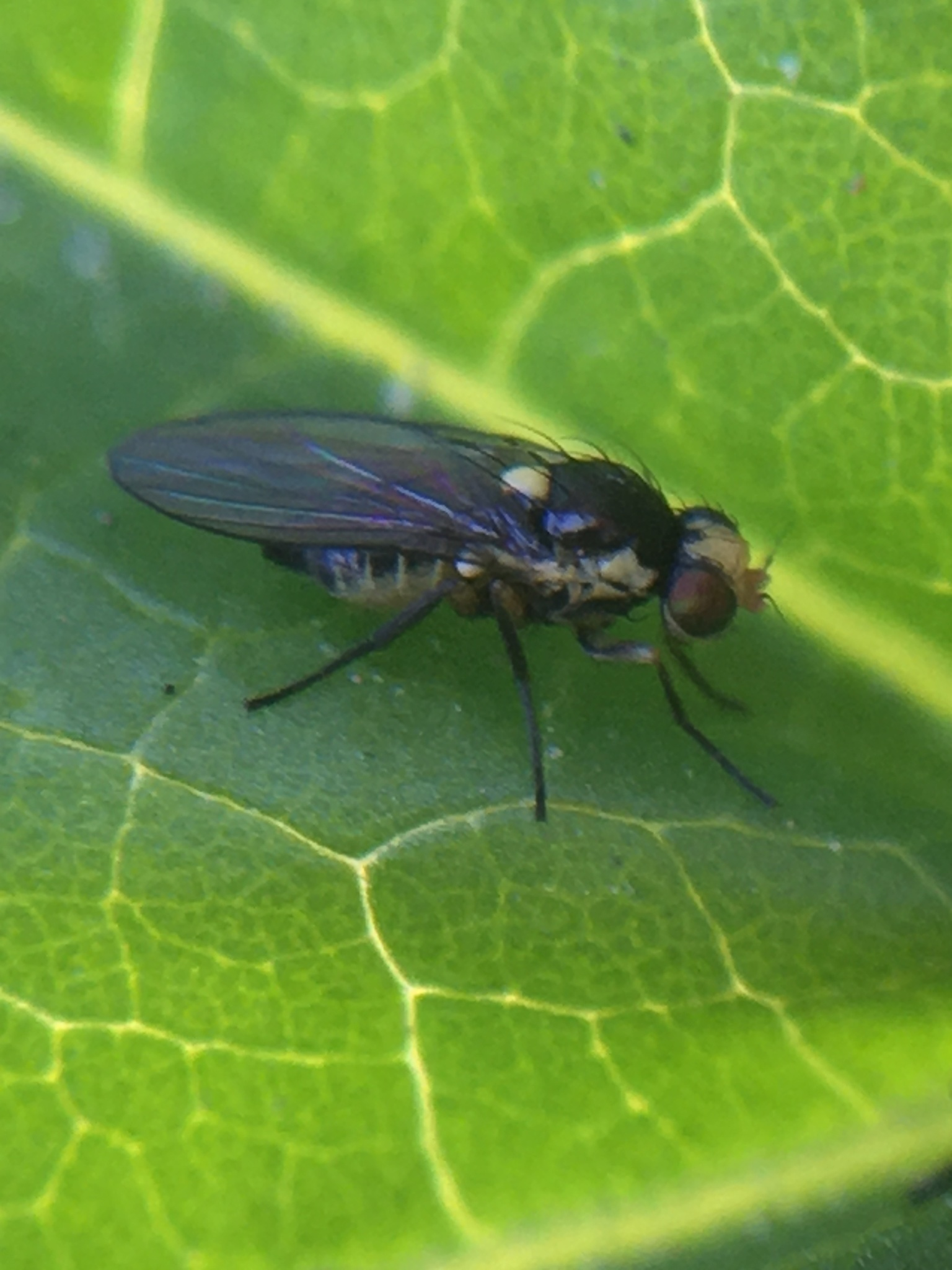
- Liriomyza huidobrensis

Scientific classification
- Kingdom: Animalia
- Phylum: Arthropoda
- Clade: Pancrustacea
- Class: Insecta
- Order: Diptera
- Family: Agromyzidae
- Subfamily: Phytomyzinae
- Genus: Liriomyza
- Species: L. huidobrensis

Binomial name
- Liriomyza huidobrensis (Blanchard, 1926)

Synonyms
- Agromyza huidobrensis Blanchard, 1926; Liriomyza cucumifoliae (Blanchard, 1938)

= Liriomyza huidobrensis =

Species of fly

Liriomyza huidobrensis, commonly known as the pea leaf miner, is a species of insect, a fly in the family Agromyzidae. The larvae of this fly mine the leaves and stems of peas and a range of other vegetables. It is also known as the serpentine leaf miner, but this name is also used for a closely related species, Liriomyza brassicae.

== Description ==
Adults of this species are tiny flies, about 2 mm (0.08 in) long, with black and yellow bodies and translucent wings.

== Distribution ==
This leaf miner originated in South America but prior to the 1980s, was restricted to that continent and Central America. In 1987, it was first found in Europe, being detected in a glasshouse in the Netherlands. From there it has spread within Europe, especially in the Mediterranean area and Eastern Europe, this latter region being surprising because the winters would be expected to be too cold. A pea leafminer already present in North America is a different species, Liriomyza langei. L. huidobrensis is now present on all continents except Australasia and Antarctica.

A new biotype has been found in Indonesia, Asia, the Mediterranean region and South America, and this biotype has expanded its range into southern California. The adult insects can fly and may scatter to a limited extent, but dispersal is mostly through the import of infected plants, with eggs, larvae or pupae already present in the leaf tissues. This insect is not found out-of-doors in Britain, but has been discovered in greenhouses in England and Wales, on each occasion being subsequently eradicated.

== Life cycle ==
The adult female leaf miner deposits eggs individually in the tissues of host plants, usually laying a total of 100 to 120 eggs. When these hatch, the larvae eat their way through the leaf tissue, leaving an intact layer of epidermis on the top and bottom of the leaf blade. The larvae passes through three instar stages before pupating.

Adult flies feed on nectar and plant sap, the females gashing leaves to access the sap and the males sometimes feeding at holes made by the females, being unable to puncture the leaves themselves. A single mating will fertilise all the female's eggs, and these are laid through circular punctures made in the leaves for this purpose. The eggs take two to five days to hatch and the larvae take up to seven days to feed. They make contorted tracks inside the leaves, usually close to the midrib and veins. These are white with moist black areas of frass and dried brown ones. When fully developed, the larvae exit the leaf and pupate in the leaf litter or soil. The pupae are protected by the chitinised remains of the last larval skin to be shed. Adults emerge from the pupae one to two weeks later. They live for two to four weeks. In warmer climates, breeding can take place during much of the year, but in some countries, such as Israel, adults are not to be seen during the heat of mid-summer. This insect is more cold-hardy than its close relative Liriomyza sativae, being able to withstand temperatures as low as −19 °C (−2.20 °F).

== Damage ==
This insect is highly polyphagous and feeds on plants in at least fifteen plant families, without showing a preference for any particular family. Crops that act as hosts to this leaf miner include peas, beans, lettuce, celery, spinach, broccoli, onions and many ornamental plants. Young plants can be severely affected and even die, and older plants have reduced photosynthetic activity and thus impaired growth rate. Even a few mines in the foliage of lettuce, celery or spinach can render the crop unmarketable. Feeding damage by adult females, and the puncture holes they make when laying eggs can affect the appearance of cut flowers and ornamental plants. In potatoes, the larvae first affect only the lower part of the plant, but as the plant matures and growth ceases, upper parts are affected, the tissues become necrotic and die.
