= Napomyza =

Scientific classification
- Kingdom: Animalia
- Phylum: Arthropoda
- Class: Insecta
- Order: Diptera
- Family: Agromyzidae
- Subfamily: Phytomyzinae
- Genus: Napomyza; Westwood, 1840

Type species
- Phytomyza festiva Meigen, 1830

Synonyms
- Dineura Lioy, 1864

Genus of flies

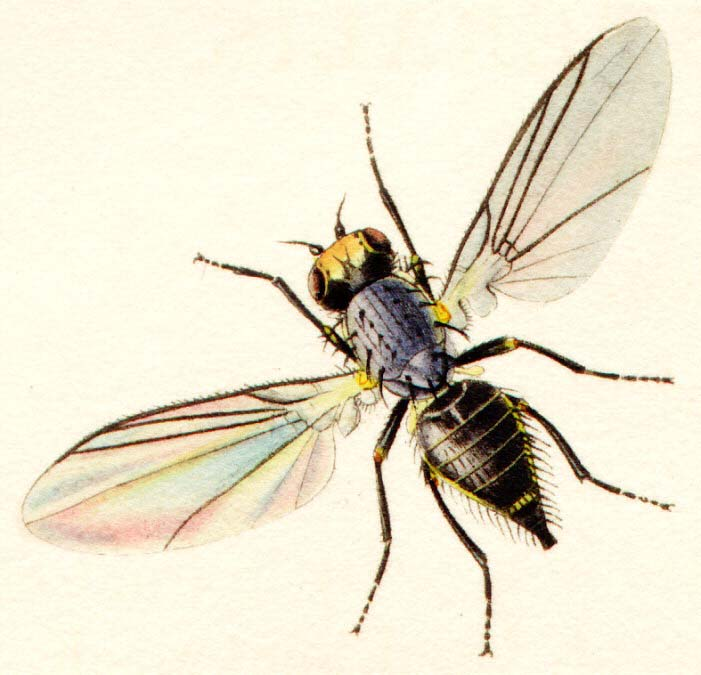

Napomyza is a genus of flies in the family Agromyzidae.

== Species ==
- Napomyza alpipennis (Fallén, 1823)
- Napomyza annulipes (Meigen, 1830)
- Napomyza blairmorensis (Sehgal, 1971)
- Napomyza bupleuri (Hering, 1963)
- Napomyza clematidicolla (Spencer, 1963)
- Napomyza clematidis (Spencer, 1969)
- Napomyza clematidis (Kaltenbach, 1859)
- Napomyza costata (Harrison, 1959)
- Napomyza drakensbergensis Spencer, 1963
- Napomyza elegans (Meigen, 1830)
- Napomyza eximia (Spencer, 1964)
- Napomyza glabra (Hendel, 1935)
- Napomyza hermonensis Spencer, 1974
- Napomyza hirtella Zlobin, 1994
- Napomyza hirticornis (Hendel, 1932)
- Napomyza improvisa (Spencer, 1976)
- Napomyza lateralis (Fallén, 1823)
- Napomyza lyalli (Spencer, 1976)
- Napomyza marginalis (Frost, 1927)
- Napomyza mima Zlobin, 1994
- Napomyza munroi Spencer, 1960
- Napomyza nigritula (Zetterstedt, 1838)
- Napomyza pusztae Papp, 2019
- Napomyza ranunculella Spencer, 1974
- Napomyza ranunculicaulis (Spencer, 1977)
- Napomyza renovata (Spencer, 1960)
- Napomyza strana Spencer, 1960
- Napomyza subeximia Spencer, 1985
- Napomyza thalhammeri (Strobl, 1900)
- Napomyza xizangensis Chen & Wang, 2003
