= Liriomyza biformata =

Scientific classification
- Kingdom: Animalia
- Phylum: Arthropoda
- Class: Insecta
- Order: Diptera
- Family: Agromyzidae
- Subfamily: Phytomyzinae
- Genus: Liriomyza
- Species: L. biformata

Binomial name
- Liriomyza biformata (Becker, 1919)

Synonyms
- Agromyza biformata Becker, 1919; Agromyza braziliensis Frost, 1939; Agromyza ecuadorensis Frost, 1939; Agromyza quadrata Malloch, 1934

Species of fly

Liriomyza biformata is a species of fly in the family Agromyzidae.

== Distribution ==
Ecuador.
