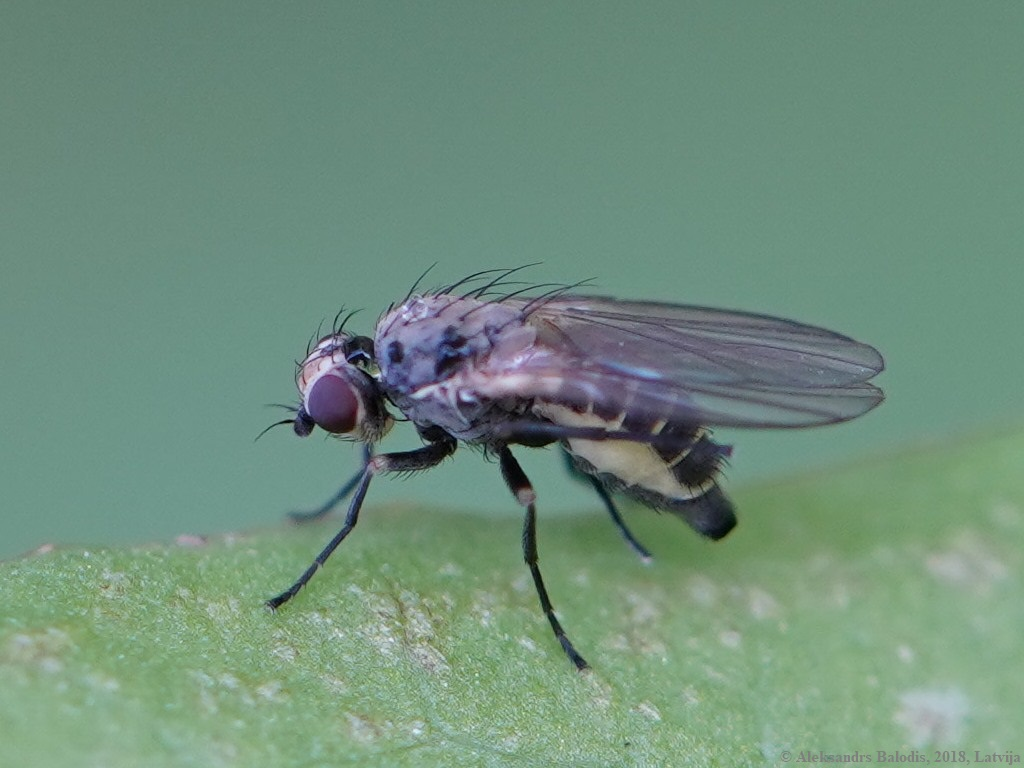
- Phytobia lateralis

Scientific classification
- Kingdom: Animalia
- Phylum: Arthropoda
- Class: Insecta
- Order: Diptera
- Family: Agromyzidae
- Subfamily: Phytomyzinae
- Genus: Phytobia; Lioy, 1864

Type species
- Agromyza errans Meigen, 1830

Synonyms
- Liomycina Enderlein, 1936; Shizukoa Sasakawa, 1963

= Phytobia =

Genus of flies

Phytobia is a genus of flies in the family Agromyzidae, with a worldwide distribution principally in Europe and the Americas.

== Description ==
All known larvae of Phytobia feed on the young xylem within stems of woody plants, creating concealed galleries that may reach considerable lengths (reportedly up to 17 m in P. betulae). P. betulae lays its eggs on the bark of new-growth twigs of suitable birch trees and, after hatching, larvae tunnel downwards along the shoot within the differentiating xylem layer, sometimes reaching the base of the tree. Adults are small- to medium-sized flies (approximately 5 mm in the case of P. betulae). Confirmed host plant families for Phytobia species include Betulaceae, Fagaceae, Rosaceae, Salicaceae, Sapindaceae, and Cupressaceae in North America, Europe, and Australia, with Asteraceae also hypothesized to be a host family based on the finding of possible larval sign on the shrub Wedelia calycina in Guadeloupe. Larval tunnels mar the appearance of certain woods used commercially, and thus may be of economic importance.

== Species ==
- Phytobia aethiops (Walker, 1853)
- Phytobia alocomentula Sasakawa, 1996
- Phytobia amazonica Sousa & Couri, 2017
- Phytobia amelanchieris (Greene, 1917)
- Phytobia aucupariae (Kangas, 1949)
- Phytobia betulivora Spencer, 1969
- Phytobia bifida Zlobin, 2002
- Phytobia bifistula Sasakawa, 2004
- Phytobia bimaculata Sasakawa, 2013
- Phytobia bohemica Cerný, 2001
- Phytobia brincki Spencer, 1965
- Phytobia cacaulandia Sousa & Couri, 2017
- Phytobia californica Spencer, 1981
- Phytobia cambii (Hendel, 1931)
- Phytobia carbonaria (Zetterstedt, 1848)
- Phytobia caudata Sasakawa, 2013
- Phytobia cerasiferae (Kangas, 1955)
- Phytobia clypeolata Sasakawa, 1996
- Phytobia colorata Spencer, 1977
- Phytobia communis Sousa & Couri, 2017
- Phytobia confessa Spencer, 1969
- Phytobia conigera Sasakawa, 2013
- Phytobia correntosana (Malloch, 1934)
- Phytobia coylesi Spencer, 1969
- Phytobia cucullata Sasakawa, 2013
- Phytobia delicata Sousa & Couri, 2017
- Phytobia diversata Spencer, 1961
- Phytobia dorsocentralis (Frost, 1936)
- Phytobia ecuadorensis Spencer, 1977
- Phytobia errans (Meigen, 1830)
- Phytobia fausta Spencer, 1977
- Phytobia flavifrontalis Sousa & Couri, 2017
- Phytobia flavohumeralis Sehgal, 1968
- Phytobia flavosquamata (Spencer, 1959)
- Phytobia frutescens Sasakawa, 1996
- Phytobia furcata (Sasakawa, 1963)
- Phytobia fusca Sasakawa, 1996
- Phytobia gigas Spencer, 1966
- Phytobia graeca Cerný, 2011
- Phytobia grandissima Singh & Ipe, 1973
- Phytobia guatemalensis Sasakawa, 2005
- Phytobia harai Sasakawa, 1994
- Phytobia hirticula (Sasakawa, 1963)
- Phytobia incerta Spencer, 1963
- Phytobia indecora (Malloch, 1918)
- Phytobia insulana Spencer, 1977
- Phytobia inusitata Spencer, 1966
- Phytobia ipeii Singh & Tandon, 1966
- Phytobia iridis (Hendel, 1927)
- Phytobia kallima Frost, 1936
- Phytobia kuhlmanni Spencer, 1966
- Phytobia lamasi Sousa & Couri, 2017
- Phytobia lanei Spencer, 1966
- Phytobia liepae Spencer, 1977
- Phytobia lineata Sasakawa, 1955
- Phytobia longipes Sasakawa, 1988
- Phytobia lunulata Hendel, 1920
- Phytobia luzonensis Sasakawa, 1996
- Phytobia maai (Spencer, 1962)
- Phytobia macalpinei Spencer, 1977
- Phytobia magna (Sasakawa, 1963)
- Phytobia malabarensis Spencer, 1977
- Phytobia mallochi (Hendel, 1924)
- Phytobia manifesta Spencer, 1977
- Phytobia matura Spencer, 1973
- Phytobia megapodema Sousa & Couri, 2017
- Phytobia mentula Sasakawa, 1992
- Phytobia millarae Spencer, 1977
- Phytobia monsonensis Sasakawa, 1992
- Phytobia morio (Brischke, 1881)
- Phytobia multisetosa Sousa & Couri, 2017
- Phytobia nigeriensis Spencer, 1977
- Phytobia nigrita (Malloch, 1914)
- Phytobia niheii Sousa & Couri, 2017
- Phytobia optabilis Spencer, 1977
- Phytobia pallida Spencer, 1986
- Phytobia pansa Sasakawa, 1996
- Phytobia papillata Sasakawa, 2013
- Phytobia paranaensis (Spencer, 1966)
- Phytobia peruensis Spencer, 1977
- Phytobia pipinna Sasakawa, 1992
- Phytobia planipalpis Sousa & Couri, 2017
- Phytobia powelli Spencer, 1981
- Phytobia prolata (Sasakawa, 1963)
- Phytobia propincua (Sasakawa, 1963)
- Phytobia pruinosa (Coquillett, 1902)
- Phytobia pruni (Grossenbacher, 1915)
- Phytobia prunivora Spencer, 1981
- Phytobia pseudobetulivora Zlobin, 2008
- Phytobia pyri Sousa & Couri, 2017
- Phytobia rabelloi Spencer, 1966
- Phytobia ruandensis (Spencer, 1959)
- Phytobia sasakawai Spencer, 1989
- Phytobia semibifurcata Zlobin, 2002
- Phytobia seticopia (Sasakawa, 1963)
- Phytobia setitibialis Sasakawa, 1992
- Phytobia setosa (Loew, 1869)
- Phytobia shizukoae Spencer, 1965
- Phytobia simpla Sousa & Couri, 2017
- Phytobia sinuosa Sasakawa, 2013
- Phytobia spinifera Sousa & Couri, 2017
- Phytobia spinulosa Sasakawa, 1992
- Phytobia subdiversata Sasakawa, 1996
- Phytobia terminalis (Sasakawa, 1963)
- Phytobia torulosa Sasakawa, 2013
- Phytobia triangularis (Sasakawa, 2013)
- Phytobia triplicis Zlobin, 2002
- Phytobia unica Spencer, 1973
- Phytobia vanduzeei Spencer, 1981
- Phytobia vilkamaai Zlobin, 2002
- Phytobia vindhyaensis Singh & Ipe, 1973
- Phytobia waltoni (Malloch, 1913)
- Phytobia xanthophora (Schiner, 1868)
- Phytobia xizangensis (Chen & Wang, 2008)
