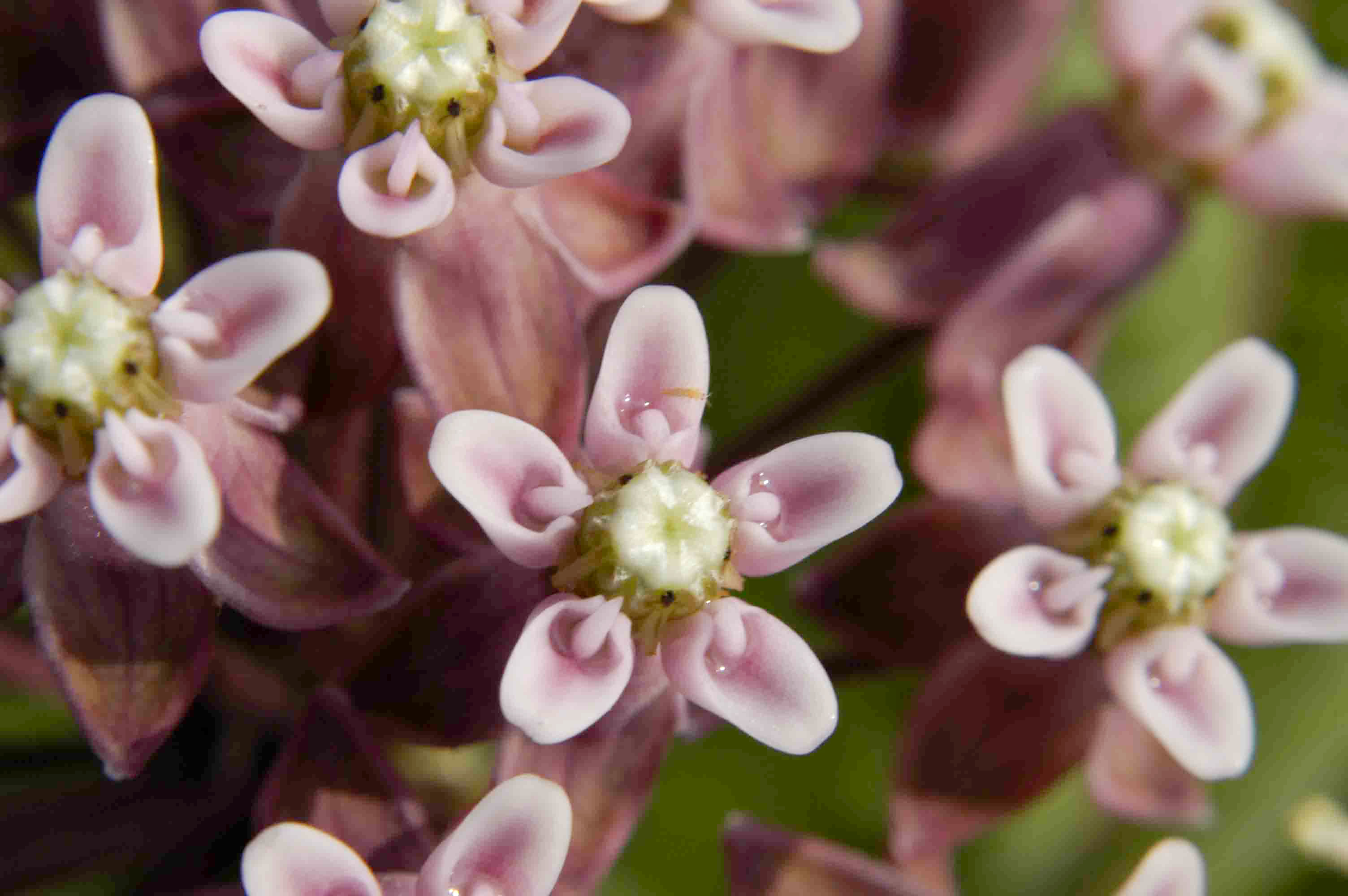

Conservation status
- Secure (NatureServe)

Scientific classification
- Kingdom: Plantae
- Clade: Tracheophytes
- Clade: Angiosperms
- Clade: Eudicots
- Clade: Asterids
- Order: Gentianales
- Family: Apocynaceae
- Genus: Asclepias
- Species: A. sullivantii

Binomial name
- Asclepias sullivantii Engelm. ex A.Gray

= Asclepias sullivantii =

Species of plant

Asclepias sullivantii is a species of flowering plant in the milkweed genus, Asclepias. Common names include prairie milkweed, Sullivant's milkweed, and smooth milkweed. It is native to North America, where it occurs in the central United States and Ontario in Canada.

== Description ==
This is a perennial herb growing from deep rhizomes. The stem is 40 centimeters to just over one meter tall. The ovate, pointed leaves are oppositely arranged and hairless. The leaves are also thick and leathery, with wavy margins, reddish midveins. They curve up on the stem. Pale to deep pinkish purple flowers are borne in rounded clusters from the leaf axils. The fruit is a greenish follicle. The flowers are insect-pollinated, but the plant often reproduces vegetatively via the rhizome.

This species is very similar to Asclepias syriaca, the common milkweed, and the two easily hybridize. Common milkweed can be distinguished by several characters. Its blunt-tipped leaf blades have a coating of hairs on the undersides and are straight on the stem, not curving up. The flowers are smaller and more numerous, and the surface of the follicle is rougher.

== Habitat ==
The native habitat of the plant includes prairie and meadows. It grows in moist areas, such as river bottomland. The original range of Asclepias sullivantii was the tall grass prairie, but very little of that habitat remains because of wide spread conversion to farming. In Minnesota it is listed as threatened species, mainly because of habitat loss, and the remaining plants are found on old railroad right ways that preserve small prairie remnants. It is restricted to mesic tall grass prairies and seems to have little ability to survive degraded habitats.

== Ecology ==
Insects that take nectar from the plant include bumblebees and other bees, wasps, ants, flies, and butterflies. The caterpillars of the monarch butterfly feed on the foliage. The larva of the milkweed leaf-miner (Liriomyza asclepiadis) mine the leaves. Aphids that can be found on the plant include the yellow milkweed aphid (Aphis nerii), black aphid (Aphis rumicis), and the green peach aphid (Myzus persicae).

The ruby-throated hummingbird takes nectar.

== Toxicity ==
Most Asclepias are toxic if consumed in large quantities due to cardiac glycoside content.
