= Outdoor Miner =

Single by Wire

from the album Chairs Missing
- B-side: "Practice Makes Perfect"
- Released: 12 January 1979
- Genre: Post-punk; jangle pop; pop
- Length: 2:51
- Label: Harvest
- Songwriters: Colin Newman; Graham Lewis
- Producer: Mike Thorne

Wire singles chronology
"Dot Dash" (1978)	"Outdoor Miner" (1979)	"A Question of Degree" (1979)

"Outdoor Miner" is a song written by Colin Newman and Graham Lewis, and performed by the English post-punk band Wire. It was released in January 1979 as the band's fourth single (reaching number 51 in the UK singles chart) and appeared on their second album, Chairs Missing.

== Background ==
The song originally appeared on Wire's 1978 album Chairs Missing. The song is based on Graham Lewis's fascination with the serpentine leaf miner insect and details the life cycle of the insect. EMI recognised that the song could potentially be a hit single, but were concerned that it was too short at only 1:45. Unusually, the record label asked the group to make a longer version for the single. They added an additional verse and chorus, plus a piano solo played by producer Mike Thorne, pushing the length to 2:51. EMI were confident that the song could become a hit and commercial breakthrough for Wire.

The single soon entered the charts, reaching number 51, and the BBC asked Wire to appear on the long-running music show Top of the Pops if the single continued to rise. At the time, Top of the Pops was one of the few opportunities for acts to promote their work on national television, with over 15 million viewers. However, the British Market Research Bureau who compiled the UK Singles Chart claimed that there was an attempt to rig the chart by EMI personnel buying multiple copies of the single. Although EMI strenuously denied any attempts at rigging the chart, that week's sales were not included. Despite selling twice as many copies as the previous week, the single dropped down the chart and Wire's chance to appear on Top of The Pops disappeared. Wire's place was instead taken by Donny and Marie Osmond, who were in London for a concert.

"Outdoor Miner"
Wire's "Outdoor Miner"

== Critical reception ==
Reviewing the single for NME, Charles Shaar Murray wrote: "This record is white and shows the dirt. Its surface is injured but rarely hurt. Guitars twang, keyboards ching, a voice intones. It is 3.55, your reviewer groans. It sounds soft and squishy, I can't hear the words. Time passes, how absurd. This group are overrated your correspondent demurs ... sod it I'm bored".

== Cover versions ==
"Outdoor Miner" has been covered by several artists. Notable versions include Lush in 1992, Flying Saucer Attack in 1994, The Lightning Seeds and Luna in 1996. In a unique move, a tribute album to the song was released in 2004 on the 25th anniversary of the song, A Houseguest's Wish: Translations of Wire's "Outdoor Miner" which has 19 different interpretations of the song. As well as the Lush and Flying Saucer Attack covers, it features covers by Sharron Kraus, Boy Division and Adam Franklin amongst others.

== Personnel ==
Personnel taken from Chairs Missing liner notes, except where noted.

Wire

- Colin Newman – vocals, guitars
- Bruce Gilbert – guitars
- Graham Lewis – bass guitar
- Robert Gotobed – drums

Additional musician

- Mike Thorne – piano (single version)
