= Liriomyza eupatoriella =

Scientific classification
- Kingdom: Animalia
- Phylum: Arthropoda
- Class: Insecta
- Order: Diptera
- Family: Agromyzidae
- Subfamily: Phytomyzinae
- Genus: Liriomyza
- Species: L. eupatoriella

Binomial name
- Liriomyza eupatoriella Spencer, 1986

Species of fly

Liriomyza eupatoriella is a species of leaf miners, the larva of a fly in the family Agromyzidae. The larva of this species mines the leaves of plants of the genus Eupatorium, commonly called "boneset", as well as related plants of other genera, including white snakeroot.
