= Liriomyza smilacinae =

Scientific classification
- Kingdom: Animalia
- Phylum: Arthropoda
- Class: Insecta
- Order: Diptera
- Family: Agromyzidae
- Subfamily: Phytomyzinae
- Genus: Liriomyza
- Species: L. smilacinae

Binomial name
- Liriomyza smilacinae Spencer, 1969

Species of fly

Liriomyza smilacinae is a species of fly in the family Agromyzidae.

== Distribution ==
Canada, California.
