= Frost Entomological Museum =

- Established: 1969
- Location: Penn State University, University Park, Pennsylvania, U.S.
- Coordinates: 40.803706°N 77.862041°W
- Type: Natural History Museum
- Collection size: 2 million specimens
- Website: https://ento.psu.edu/frost

The Frost Entomological Museum is an active research institution, associated with the Pennsylvania State University's flagship campus in University Park, Pennsylvania. The museum houses a research collection, estimated at 1.3 million arthropod specimens, and a public exhibition and educational space. Although the museum was founded in 1969, much of the collection dates to the early 1900s and even the late 1800s.

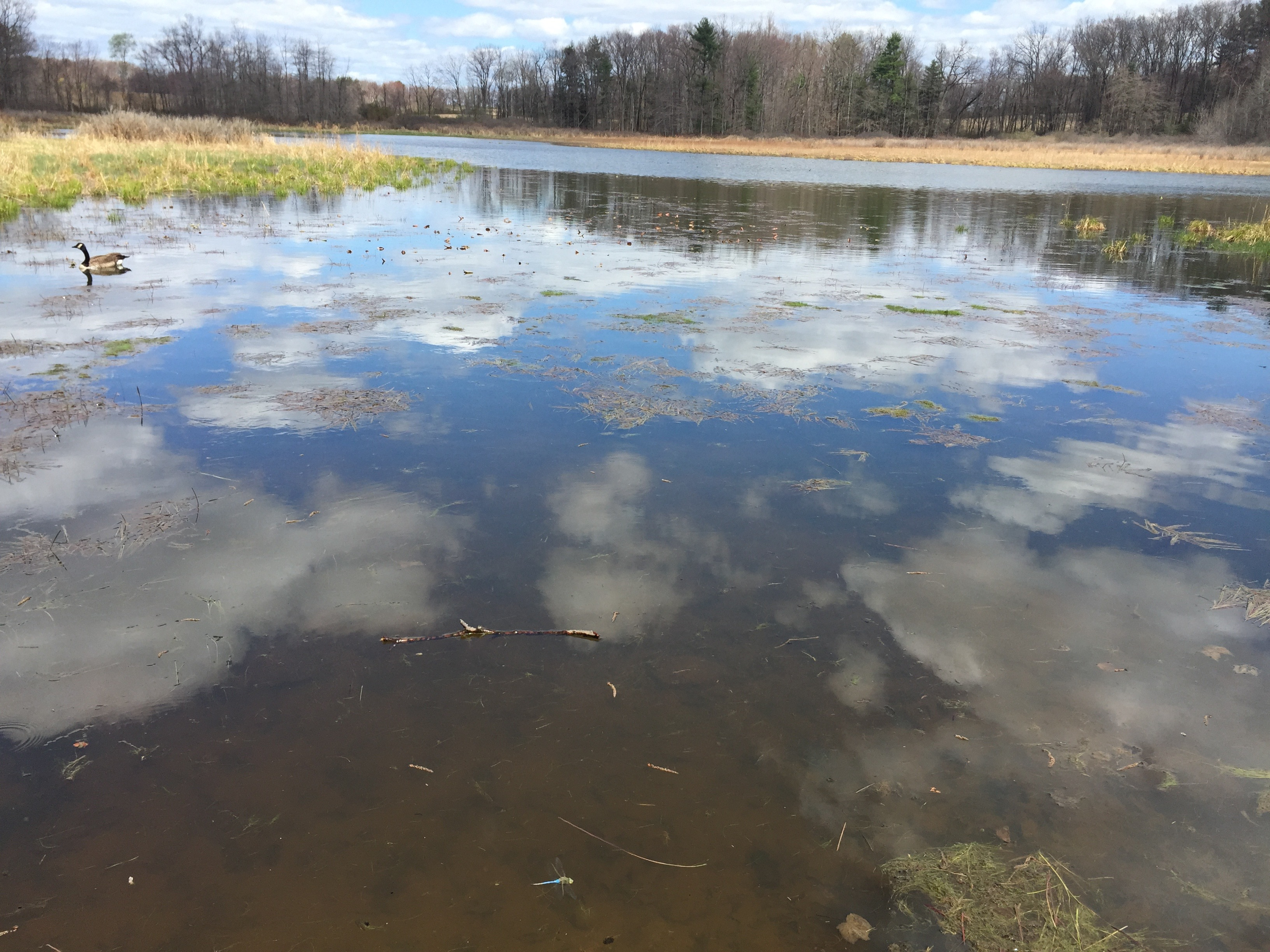
Ten acre pond, near the museum

The research collection provides a record of the insect biodiversity of the Commonwealth of Pennsylvania and the eastern and southeastern United States. Major collection holdings include:

- Aphididae - The John O. Pepper aphid collection consists of over 32,000 mounted specimens, representing at least 800 species. The collection is especially strong in aphids from central Pennsylvania.
- Anoplura - The K. C. Kim collection of sucking lice comprises more than 15,000 slide-mounts and represents approximately 300 species.
- Odonata - The George H. and Alice F. Beatty Collection includes more than 60,000 dragonfly and damselfly specimens, collected from the 1940s through the 1970s. More than 1,000 species are represented, and half of the specimens were collected in Mexico.

Other notable collections, which reflect the interests of the museum's namesake, Dr. Stuart W. Frost, include leaf miners, light-trapped insects, and arthropods of the Archbold Biological Station.

== External References ==
- Penn State University Department of Entomology
- The Frost Entomological Museum
