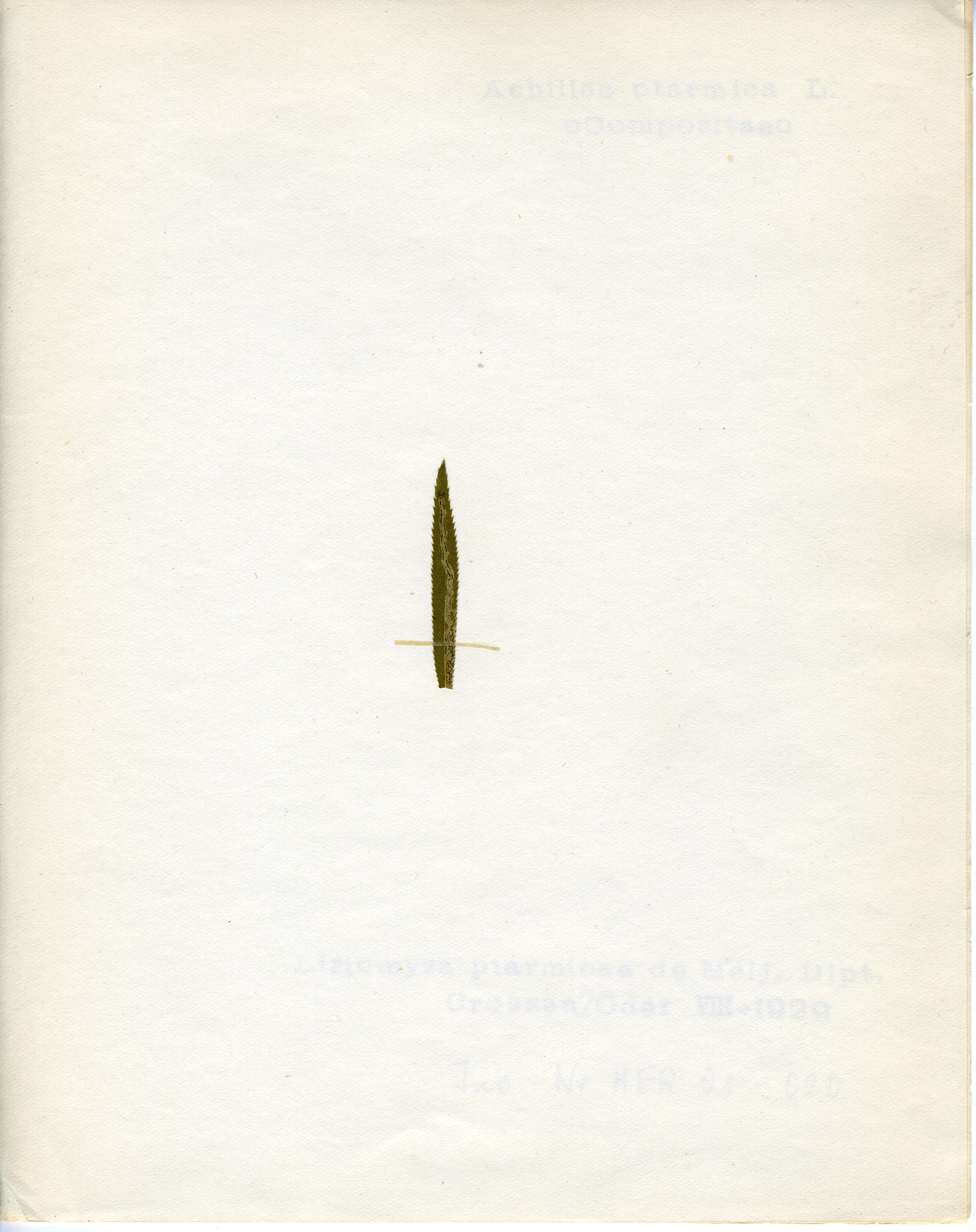

Scientific classification
- Kingdom: Animalia
- Phylum: Arthropoda
- Clade: Pancrustacea
- Class: Insecta
- Order: Diptera
- Family: Agromyzidae
- Subfamily: Phytomyzinae
- Genus: Liriomyza
- Species: L. ptarmicae

Binomial name
- Liriomyza ptarmicae Meijere, 1925

Synonyms
- Liriomyza aesalon Hering, 1936; Liriomyza chrysanthemi Hering, 1956; Liriomyza millefolii Hering, 1927

= Liriomyza ptarmicae =

Species of fly

Liriomyza ptarmicae is a species of fly in the family Agromyzidae.

== Distribution ==
United States, Palaearctic.
