= Phytobia betulae =

Scientific classification
- Kingdom: Animalia
- Phylum: Arthropoda
- Class: Insecta
- Order: Diptera
- Family: Agromyzidae
- Genus: Phytobia
- Species: P. betulae

Binomial name
- Phytobia betulae (Kangas, 1935)

Species of insect

Phytobia betulae is a species of fly in the family Agromyzidae. It is native to Northern and Eastern Europe, being common in Scandinavia. Its larvae tunnel through the branches and trunk of birch trees, often leaving a dark stain in the timber but not adversely affecting the tree's growth.

== Description ==
The eggs of P. betulae are small, white, and oval. The larvae are transparent or white and narrowly cylindrical, with the final (third) instar reaching a length of 15 to 20 mm (0.6 to 0.8 in). The pupae are barrel-shaped, whitish, or pale yellow. The adults are small black flies, up to 5 mm (0.2 in) long.

== Life cycle ==
Phytobia betulae has a single generation each year. The insects emerge from pupation in early summer and the female searches out a suitable host tree, usually Betula pendula or B. pubescens. Eggs are deposited singly under the bark of new-growth twigs. They hatch after about one week and the larvae tunnel downwards along the shoot within the differentiating xylem layer. Although narrow at first, the tunnels become up to 4 mm (0.16 in) wide and extremely long (17 m (56 ft)), often reaching the base of the tree; the larvae may reverse direction and mine upwards in the trunk or continue to tunnel into the root system before returning to the trunk. Larval tunnels from this species will often cause discoloration (brown stripes) in the wood of birch trees, but they do not however affect the tree's survival and growth. The tunnels are filled with frass, and there may be some short side passages in the tree bole. The larvae emerge near the base of the tree in the late summer or early autumn, fall to the ground and pupate in the plant litter or soil, where they overwinter.

== Ecology ==
When choosing where to lay eggs, the adult female P. betulae probes twigs in the upper part of the crown of host trees with its ovipositor and tends to select vigorous young shoots. The larvae do best on fast growing trees and the tree may be infected every year, leaving permanent marks in the timber. Once the tree reaches around thirty years of age its growth rate slows and infections diminish. Two species of braconid and one species of ichneumid wasp parasitize the larvae, laying their eggs in the first instar. The pupae are probably eaten by predatory insects and small mammals and birds.
