= Liriomyza schmidti =

Scientific classification
- Kingdom: Animalia
- Phylum: Arthropoda
- Class: Insecta
- Order: Diptera
- Family: Agromyzidae
- Subfamily: Phytomyzinae
- Genus: Liriomyza
- Species: L. schmidti

Binomial name
- Liriomyza schmidti (Aldrich, 1929)

Synonyms
- Agromyza schmidti Aldrich, 1929

Species of fly

Liriomyza schmidti is a species of fly in the family Agromyzidae.

== Distribution ==
Florida, West Indies, Costa Rica.
