= Liriomyza bryoniae =

Scientific classification
- Kingdom: Animalia
- Phylum: Arthropoda
- Class: Insecta
- Order: Diptera
- Family: Agromyzidae
- Genus: Liriomyza
- Species: L. bryoniae

Binomial name
- Liriomyza bryoniae Kaltenbach

Species of fly

Liriomyza bryoniae is a species of leaf miner fly in the family Agromyzidae, native to northwestern Europe. It is an occasional pest of horticultural crops; host plants include tomatoes, cucumbers, melons, egg plants, potatoes and various other plants growing under glass or in the open.
