= Liriomyza sativae =

Scientific classification
- Kingdom: Animalia
- Phylum: Arthropoda
- Clade: Pancrustacea
- Class: Insecta
- Order: Diptera
- Family: Agromyzidae
- Subfamily: Phytomyzinae
- Genus: Liriomyza
- Species: L. sativae

Binomial name
- Liriomyza sativae Blanchard, 1938

Synonyms
- Agromyza subpusilla Frost, 1943; Liriomyza canomarginis Frick, 1952; Liriomyza guytona Freeman, 1958; Liriomyza minutiseta Frick, 1952; Liriomyza munda Frick, 1957; Liriomyza propepusilla Frost, 1954; Liriomyza pullata Frick, 1952; Liriomyza verbenicola Hering, 1951

Species of fly

Liriomyza sativae, commonly known as the vegetable leaf miner, is a species of insect, a fly in the family Agromyzidae. The larvae of this fly mine the leaves of a range of vegetables and weeds, but seem to favour plants in the families Cucurbitaceae, Fabaceae and Solanaceae.

== Description ==
Eggs of L. sativae measure approximately 0.25 by 0.12 mm (0.010 by 0.005 in) and are translucent and whitish. The larvae are legless grubs, with no head capsule. They are translucent at first, but become yellowish-orange in later instars. The pupae are oval and slightly flattened and vary in colour from yellowish-orange to a darker golden brown when the adults are nearly ready to emerge. The adults are up to 1.7 mm (0.07 in) long, with females being larger than males; the face, frons, third segment of the antenna and scutellum are yellow, and the mesothorax and abdomen are black, although the edges of some plates on the abdomen are yellow. This unique mesonotum is useful in distinguishing L. sativae from their close relatives L. trifolii. The limbs are brown with yellow femora and coxa.

The flight mechanism of this insect is of interest, as it makes partial use of the unusual mechanism of clap and fling, mainly employed by very small insects such as thrips. L. sativae uses the mechanism only on the outer part of the wing to increase lift by some 7% when hovering.

== Distribution ==
L. sativae occurs in the southern part of the United States, in Central America and in much of South America. It is sometimes detected in more northerly parts of the United States having been transported there in plant material, but it is unable to survive in cold weather (apart from in glasshouses).

== Host range ==
The larvae of Liriomyza sativae mine the leaves of a number of plants grown as vegetables as well as many weeds, with forty plants from ten families acting as hosts in Florida. Plants in the families Cucurbitaceae, Fabaceae and Solanaceae are often infested, and vegetable crops affected include beans, eggplant, potato, pepper, tomato, squash and watermelon. Celery is also attacked, but to a lesser extent than by the closely related American leaf miner (Liriomyza trifolii), and wild plants that act as host include Solanum americanum and Bidens alba.

== Life cycle ==
The female lays eggs inside the leaf tissues of a susceptible plant, creating small puncture holes. The developing larva feeds on the leaf tissue, creating a tunnel between the upper and lower surfaces as it advances. This starts small but gets wider as the larva increases in size. After three instars, the larva cuts a slit, usually in the upper leaf surface, and falls to the ground where it pupates. At 25 to 30 °C (77 to 86 °F), the larval stage lasts for about eight days with a similar period for the pupal stage, whereas at 15 °C (59 °F), the whole cycle takes twenty-five days. A female may lay several hundred eggs over the course of her life-span of a month.

== Control ==
Leaf miners in general are kept under control by their natural enemies. However, in the mid-twentieth century, L. sativae became a serious pest of tomatoes in Florida, having been a minor problem before, when use of insecticides (DDT and BHC) proved more lethal to the braconid wasps that parasitised them than to the other insects the pesticides were designed to control. In addition, the leaf miners quickly developed resistance to various insecticides used against them.

Where a crop is vulnerable, some cultivars may be more susceptible to attack than others. Growing a crop in close proximity to weeds, or adjacent to a crop like cotton where leaf miners are already present, may result in the pest insects moving in to the new crop. With insecticides not always being effective, various management strategies have been attempted to control the leaf miners, one possibility being the application of entomopathogenic nematodes in aqueous suspension under humid conditions.
