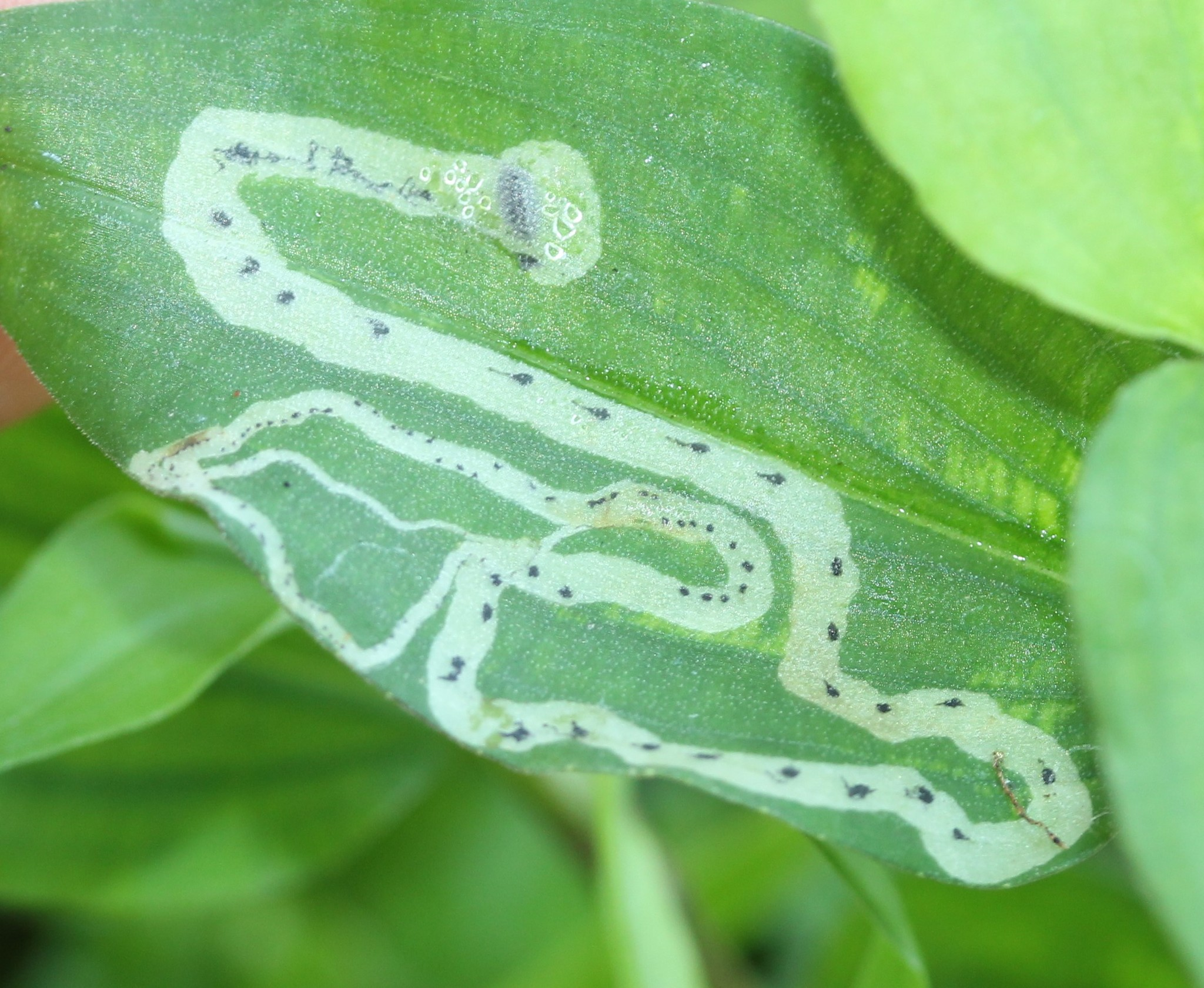
- Leaf mines caused by Liriomyza commelinae larvae

Scientific classification
- Kingdom: Animalia
- Phylum: Arthropoda
- Class: Insecta
- Order: Diptera
- Family: Agromyzidae
- Subfamily: Phytomyzinae
- Genus: Liriomyza
- Species: L. commelinae

Binomial name
- Liriomyza commelinae (Frost, 1931)

Synonyms
- Agromyza commelinae Frost, 1931; Liriomyza bahamondesi Blanchard, 1954

= Liriomyza commelinae =

Species of fly

Liriomyza commelinae is a species of fly in the family Agromyzidae.

== Distribution ==
Florida, Neotropical.
