= Napomyza nigritula =

Scientific classification
- Kingdom: Animalia
- Phylum: Arthropoda
- Class: Insecta
- Order: Diptera
- Family: Agromyzidae
- Subfamily: Phytomyzinae
- Genus: Napomyza
- Species: N. nigritula

Binomial name
- Napomyza nigritula (Zetterstedt, 1838)

Synonyms
- Phytomyza cineracea Hendel, 1920; Phytomyza nigrigenis Hering, 1937; Phytomyza nigritula Zetterstedt, 1838

Species of fly

Napomyza nigritula is a species of fly in the family Agromyzidae.

== Distribution ==
Europe, Canada, United States.
