= Phytobia errans =

Scientific classification
- Kingdom: Animalia
- Phylum: Arthropoda
- Class: Insecta
- Order: Diptera
- Family: Agromyzidae
- Subfamily: Phytomyzinae
- Genus: Phytobia
- Species: P. errans

Binomial name
- Phytobia errans (Meigen, 1830)

Synonyms
- Agromyza errans Meigen, 1830

Species of fly

Phytobia errans is a species of fly in the family Agromyzidae.

== Distribution ==
Germany.
