= Liriomyza nigriscutellata =

Scientific classification
- Kingdom: Animalia
- Phylum: Arthropoda
- Class: Insecta
- Order: Diptera
- Family: Agromyzidae
- Subfamily: Phytomyzinae
- Genus: Liriomyza
- Species: L. nigriscutellata

Binomial name
- Liriomyza nigriscutellata Spencer, 1981

Species of fly

Liriomyza nigriscutellata is a species of fly in the family Agromyzidae.

== Distribution ==
California.
