= Napomyza elegans =

Scientific classification
- Kingdom: Animalia
- Phylum: Arthropoda
- Class: Insecta
- Order: Diptera
- Family: Agromyzidae
- Subfamily: Phytomyzinae
- Genus: Napomyza
- Species: N. elegans

Binomial name
- Napomyza elegans (Meigen, 1830)

Synonyms
- Phytomyza elegans Meigen, 1830; Phytomyza festiva Meigen, 1830

Species of fly

Napomyza elegans is a species of fly in the family Agromyzidae. It is mostly yellow although the top of its thorax and some horizontal stripes on the gaster are black.

== Distribution ==
Germany.
