= Liriomyza blechi =

Scientific classification
- Kingdom: Animalia
- Phylum: Arthropoda
- Class: Insecta
- Order: Diptera
- Family: Agromyzidae
- Subfamily: Phytomyzinae
- Genus: Liriomyza
- Species: L. blechi

Binomial name
- Liriomyza blechi Spencer, 1973

Species of fly

Liriomyza blechi is a species of fly in the family Agromyzidae.

== Distribution ==
United States.
