= Napomyza thalhammeri =

Scientific classification
- Kingdom: Animalia
- Phylum: Arthropoda
- Class: Insecta
- Order: Diptera
- Family: Agromyzidae
- Subfamily: Phytomyzinae
- Genus: Napomyza
- Species: N. thalhammeri

Binomial name
- Napomyza thalhammeri (Strobl, 1900)

Synonyms
- Phytomyza thalhammeri Strobl, 1900

Species of fly

Napomyza thalhammeri is a species of fly in the family Agromyzidae.

== Distribution ==
Yugoslavia.
