= Liriomyza virgula =

Scientific classification
- Kingdom: Animalia
- Phylum: Arthropoda
- Clade: Pancrustacea
- Class: Insecta
- Order: Diptera
- Family: Agromyzidae
- Subfamily: Phytomyzinae
- Genus: Liriomyza
- Species: L. virgula

Binomial name
- Liriomyza virgula Frey, 1946

Synonyms
- Liriomyza larissa Hering, 1956

Species of fly

Liriomyza virgula is a species of leaf miner fly in the family Agromyzidae.

== Description ==
The adult fly has a wing length of c. 1.75 mm.

== Distribution ==
L. virgula is a Western Palaearctic species known from Belgium, Belarus, Czech Republic, Estonia, Finland, France, Germany, Hungary, Italy, Kazakhstan, Lithuania, Norway, Slovakia, Switzerland, Turkey, and the United Kingdom.
