= Liriomyza septentrionalis =

Scientific classification
- Kingdom: Animalia
- Phylum: Arthropoda
- Class: Insecta
- Order: Diptera
- Family: Agromyzidae
- Subfamily: Phytomyzinae
- Genus: Liriomyza
- Species: L. septentrionalis

Binomial name
- Liriomyza septentrionalis Sehgal, 1968

Species of fly

Liriomyza septentrionalis is a species of fly in the family Agromyzidae.

== Distribution ==
Alberta, British Columbia, California, Colorado
