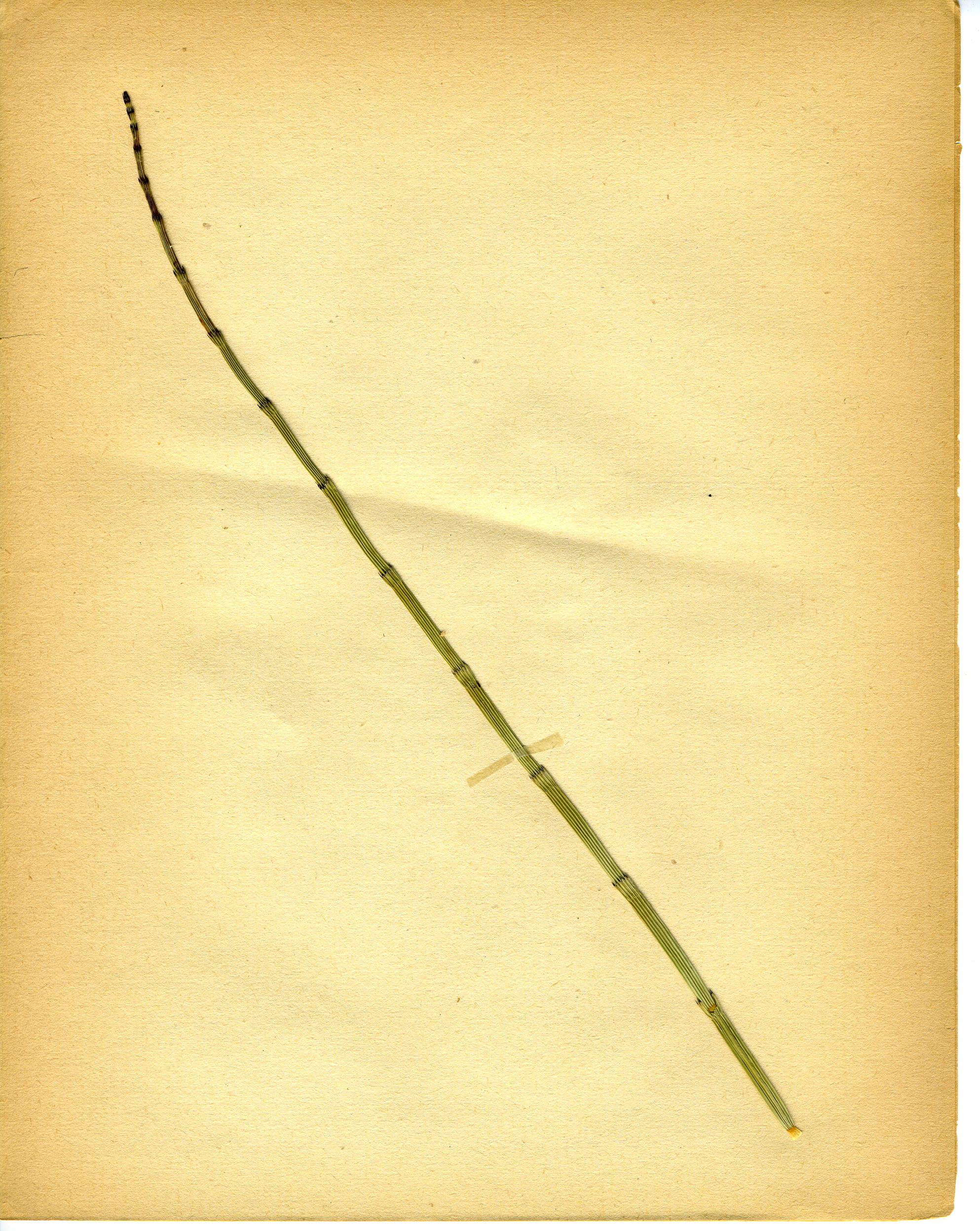

Scientific classification
- Kingdom: Animalia
- Phylum: Arthropoda
- Class: Insecta
- Order: Diptera
- Family: Agromyzidae
- Subfamily: Phytomyzinae
- Genus: Liriomyza
- Species: L. virgo

Binomial name
- Liriomyza virgo (Zetterstedt, 1837)

Synonyms
- Agromyza pallidicornis Papp, 1984; Agromyza virgo Zetterstedt, 1837; Agromyza virgo Zetterstedt, 1838; Liriomyza arcticola Spencer, 1969; Liriomyza pallicornis Spencer, 1976; Phytomyza pallicornis Zetterstedt, 1848

= Liriomyza virgo =

Species of fly

Liriomyza virgo is a species of fly in the family Agromyzidae.

== Distribution ==
Sweden.
