= Liriomyza fricki =

Scientific classification
- Kingdom: Animalia
- Phylum: Arthropoda
- Class: Insecta
- Order: Diptera
- Family: Agromyzidae
- Subfamily: Phytomyzinae
- Genus: Liriomyza
- Species: L. fricki

Binomial name
- Liriomyza fricki Spencer, 1965

Species of fly

Liriomyza fricki is a species of fly in the family Agromyzidae.

== Distribution ==
United States.
