= Phytobia ruandensis =

Scientific classification
- Kingdom: Animalia
- Phylum: Arthropoda
- Class: Insecta
- Order: Diptera
- Family: Agromyzidae
- Subfamily: Phytomyzinae
- Genus: Phytobia
- Species: P. ruandensis

Binomial name
- Phytobia ruandensis (Spencer, 1959)

Synonyms
- Agromyza ruandensis Spencer, 1959

Species of fly

Phytobia ruandensis is a species of fly in the family Agromyzidae.

== Distribution ==
Rwanda.
