= Liriomyza marginalis =

Scientific classification
- Kingdom: Animalia
- Phylum: Arthropoda
- Class: Insecta
- Order: Diptera
- Family: Agromyzidae
- Subfamily: Phytomyzinae
- Genus: Liriomyza
- Species: L. marginalis

Binomial name
- Liriomyza marginalis (Malloch, 1913)

Synonyms
- Agromyza melampyga var. marginalis Malloch, 1913

Species of fly

Liriomyza marginalis is a species of fly in the family Agromyzidae.

== Distribution ==
United States, West Indies, Brazil.
