= Liriomyza flaveola =

Scientific classification
- Kingdom: Animalia
- Phylum: Arthropoda
- Class: Insecta
- Order: Diptera
- Family: Agromyzidae
- Subfamily: Phytomyzinae
- Genus: Liriomyza
- Species: L. flaveola

Binomial name
- Liriomyza flaveola (Fallén, 1823)

Synonyms
- Agromyza albicornis Meigen, 1838; Agromyza blanda Meigen, 1830; Agromyza flaveola Fallén, 1823; Agromyza variegata Meigen, 1838

Species of fly

Liriomyza flaveola is a species of fly in the family Agromyzidae.

== Distribution ==
California, Europe.
