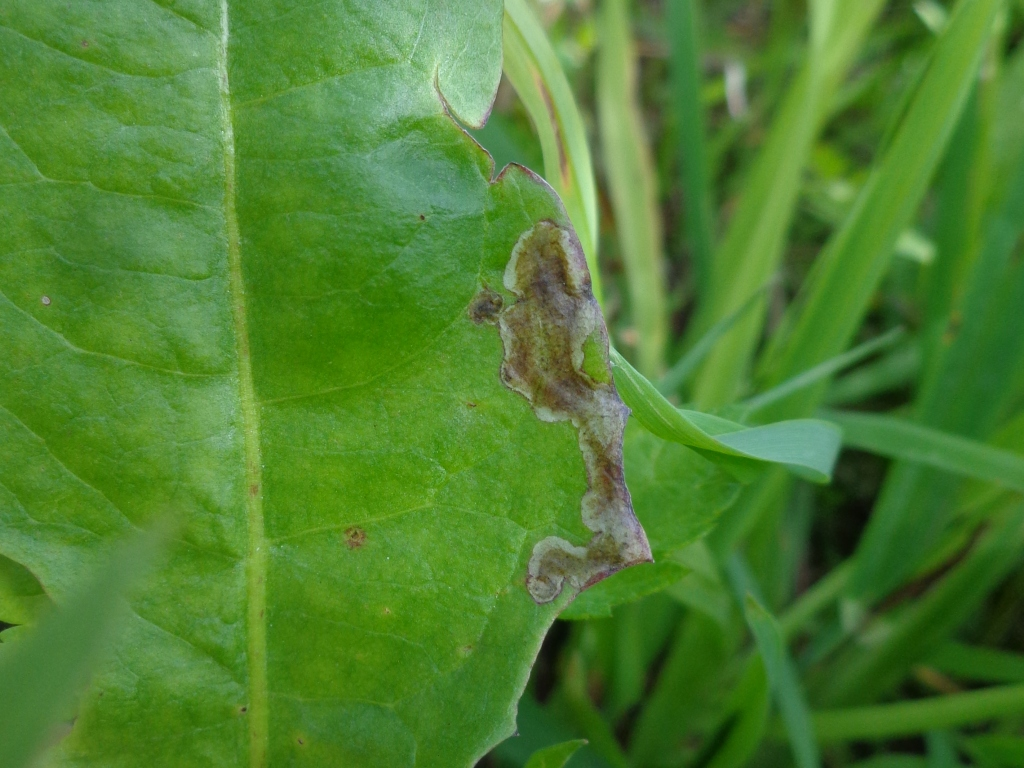
- Mine of Liriomyza taraxaci

Scientific classification
- Kingdom: Animalia
- Phylum: Arthropoda
- Class: Insecta
- Order: Diptera
- Family: Agromyzidae
- Subfamily: Phytomyzinae
- Genus: Liriomyza
- Species: L. taraxaci

Binomial name
- Liriomyza taraxaci Hering, 1927

= Liriomyza taraxaci =

Species of fly

Liriomyza taraxaci is a species of fly in the family Agromyzidae.

== Distribution ==
Canada, United States, Palaearctic.
