= Liriomyza urophorina =

Scientific classification
- Kingdom: Animalia
- Phylum: Arthropoda
- Class: Insecta
- Order: Diptera
- Family: Agromyzidae
- Subfamily: Phytomyzinae
- Genus: Liriomyza
- Species: L. urophorina

Binomial name
- Liriomyza urophorina Mik, 1894

Species of fly

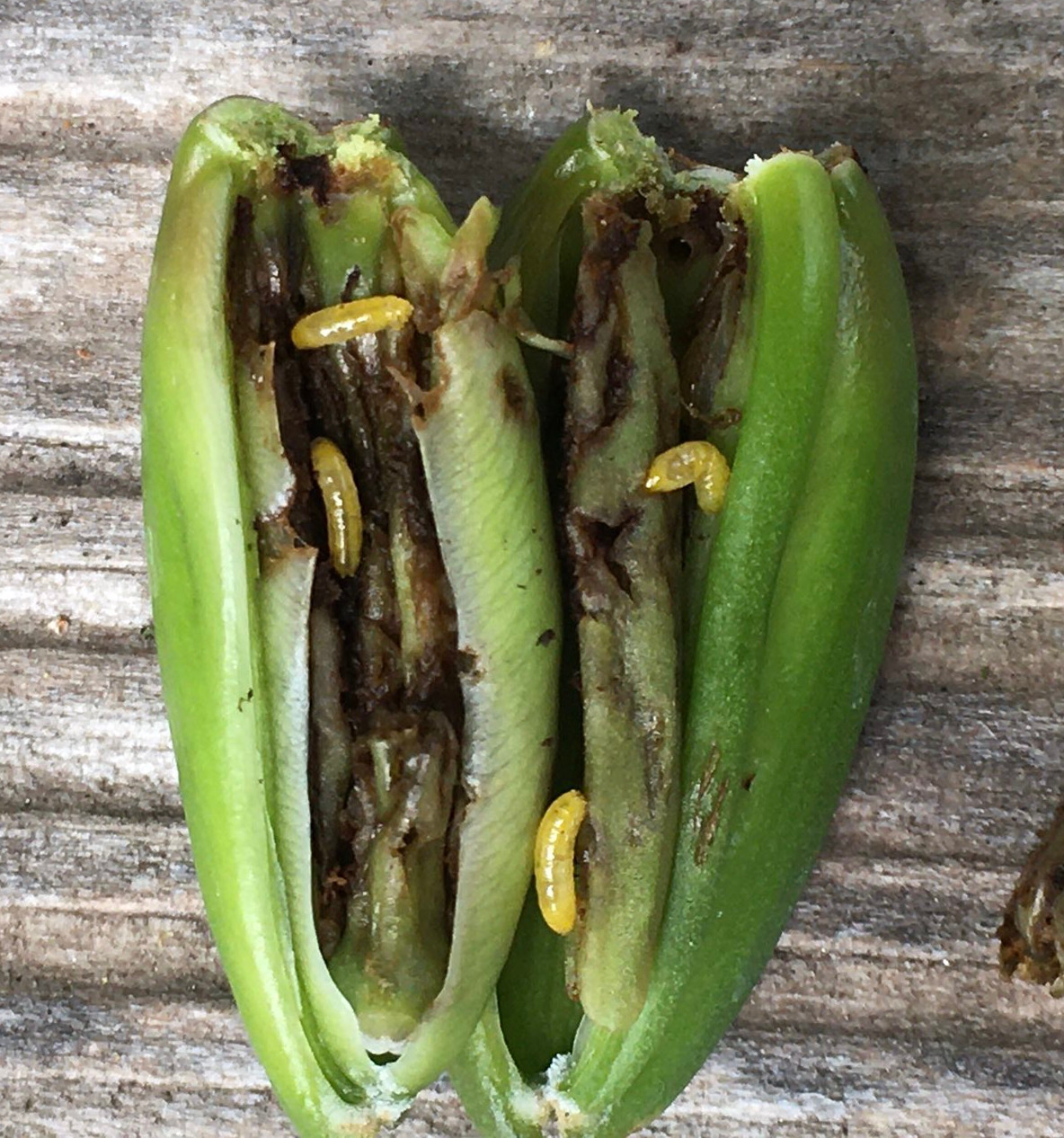
Liriomyza urophorina larvae in Lilium bud

Liriomyza urophorina is a species of fly in the family Agromyzidae.

== Distribution ==
India, Europe.
