= Liriomyza langei =

Scientific classification
- Kingdom: Animalia
- Phylum: Arthropoda
- Class: Insecta
- Order: Diptera
- Family: Agromyzidae
- Subfamily: Phytomyzinae
- Genus: Liriomyza
- Species: L. langei

Binomial name
- Liriomyza langei Frick, 1951

Synonyms
- Liriomyza decora Blanchard, 1954; Liriomyza dianthi Frick, 1958

Species of fly

Liriomyza langei is a species of fly in the family Agromyzidae.

== Distribution ==
United States.
