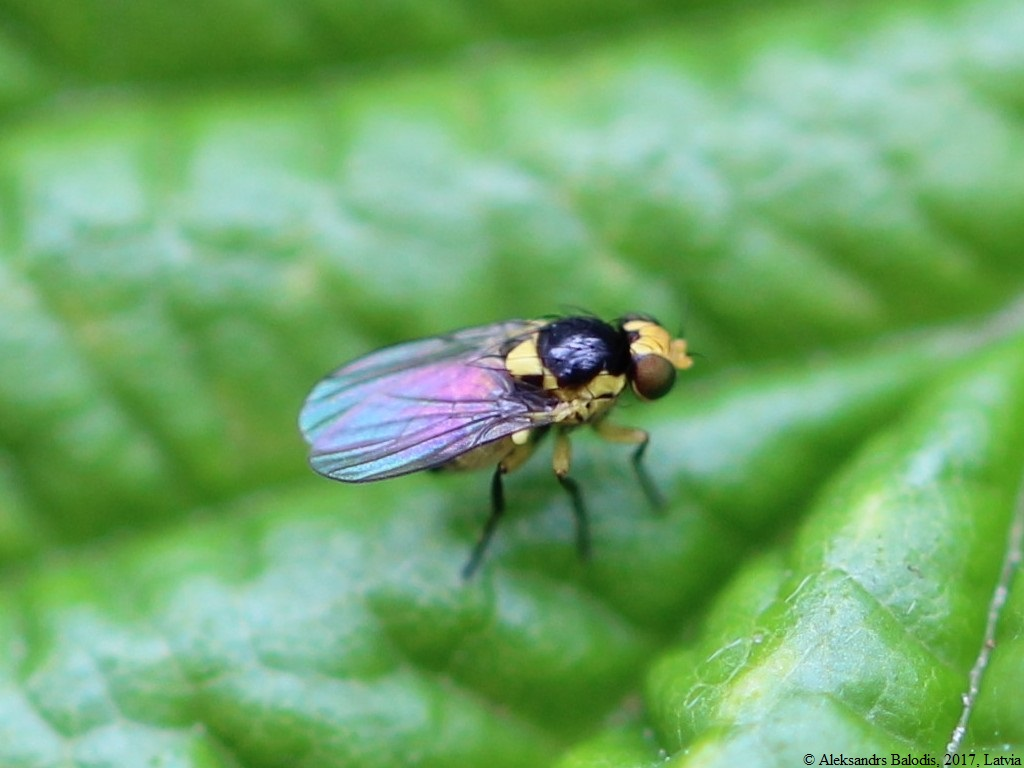

Scientific classification
- Kingdom: Animalia
- Phylum: Arthropoda
- Class: Insecta
- Order: Diptera
- Family: Agromyzidae
- Subfamily: Phytomyzinae
- Genus: Liriomyza
- Species: L. pusilla

Binomial name
- Liriomyza pusilla (Meigen, 1830)

Synonyms
- Agromyza pusilla Meigen, 1830; Liriomyza compositella Spencer, 1961

= Liriomyza pusilla =

Species of fly

Liriomyza pusilla is a species of fly in the family Agromyzidae.

== Distribution ==
Germany.
