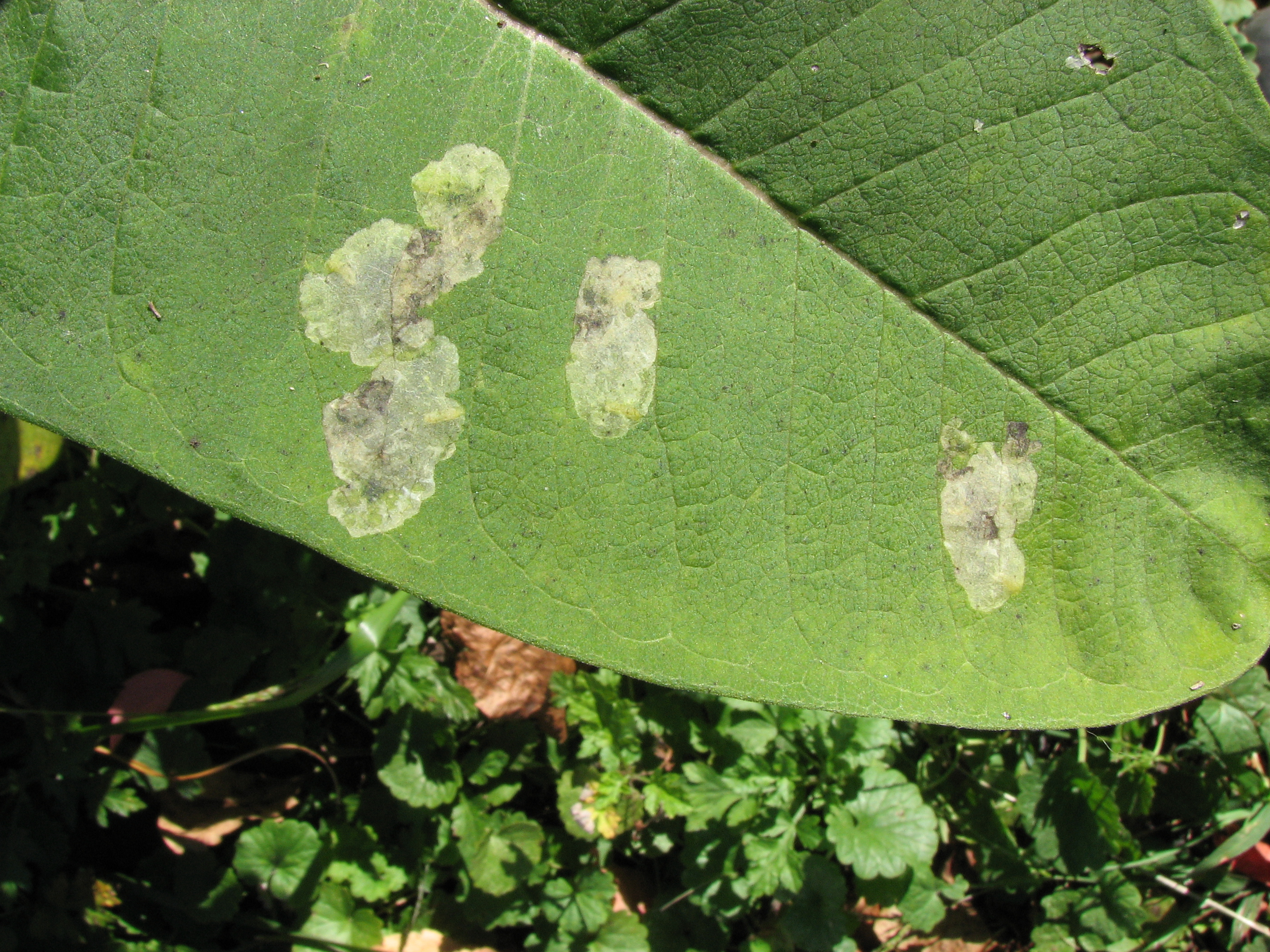
- Liriomyza asclepiadis mines

Scientific classification
- Kingdom: Animalia
- Phylum: Arthropoda
- Class: Insecta
- Order: Diptera
- Family: Agromyzidae
- Subfamily: Phytomyzinae
- Genus: Liriomyza
- Species: L. asclepiadis

Binomial name
- Liriomyza asclepiadis Spencer, 1969

= Liriomyza asclepiadis =

Species of fly

Liriomyza asclepiadis is a species of fly in the family Agromyzidae.

== Distribution ==
Canada, United States.
