= Stuart W. Frost =

American entomologist

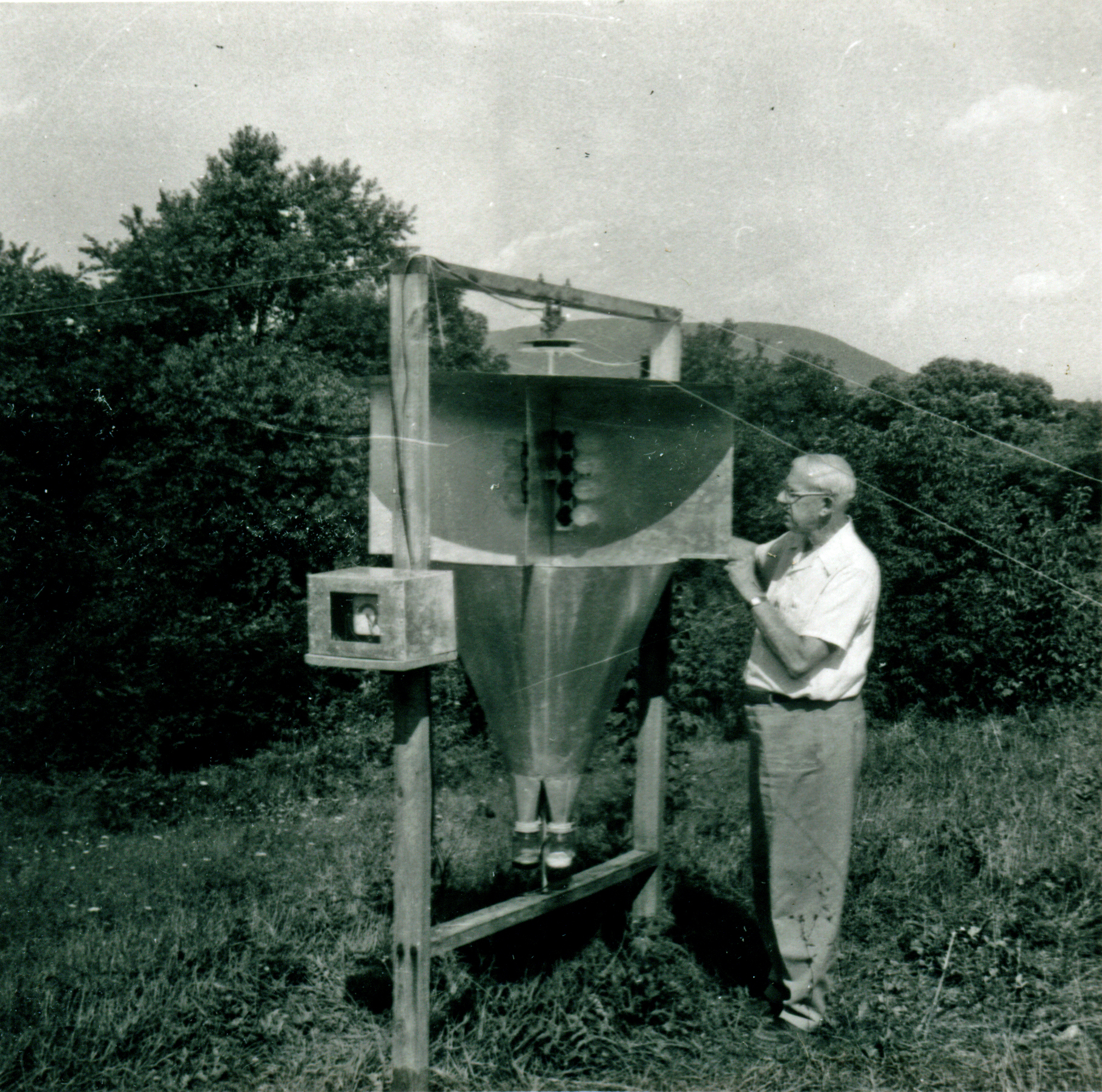
- Stuart W. Frost standing with one of his light traps
- Born: December 4, 1891; Tarrytown, New York
- Died: January 21, 1980 (aged 88)
- Education: Cornell University
- Scientific career
- Fields: Entomology
- Workplaces: Cornell University

Stuart W. Frost (1891–1980) was a professor of entomology at The Pennsylvania State University, University Park, Pennsylvania. He was born in Tarrytown, New York, and graduated from Cornell University. He was a specialist in leaf-mining flies (Diptera). The Frost Entomological Museum at Penn State was named in his honor.

Born in New York, Stuart W. Frost was trained in the legendary John Henry Comstock's lab at Cornell. In his lifetime, Frost published over 200 papers and 4 books and proposed names for 46 species of Diptera. Over his four decades of affiliation with Penn State University, he added thousands of specimens to the entomological research collection.

From an early age, Frost was interested in natural history, spending much of his free time exploring the New York scenery around him. He would fastidiously record his observations of the flora and fauna he encountered, occasionally bringing different species home for experimentation. At this time he also visited the American Museum of Natural History in New York, learning the different techniques of insect preservation.

He began his undergraduate studies at Cornell University in 1911, receiving a laboratory assistantship in entomology. Frost assisted with a variety of classes with Professor Glenn W. Herrick, Dr. J.C. Bradley, and Dr. Robert Matheson. Graduating with his undergraduate degree in 1915, Frost took a job with the New York State Food Supply Commission, an organization that worked on optimizing food production during World War I. He attended Cornell University for graduate coursework from 1915 to 1918, collaborating with entomologists from a variety of institutions, particularly from institutions with museums.

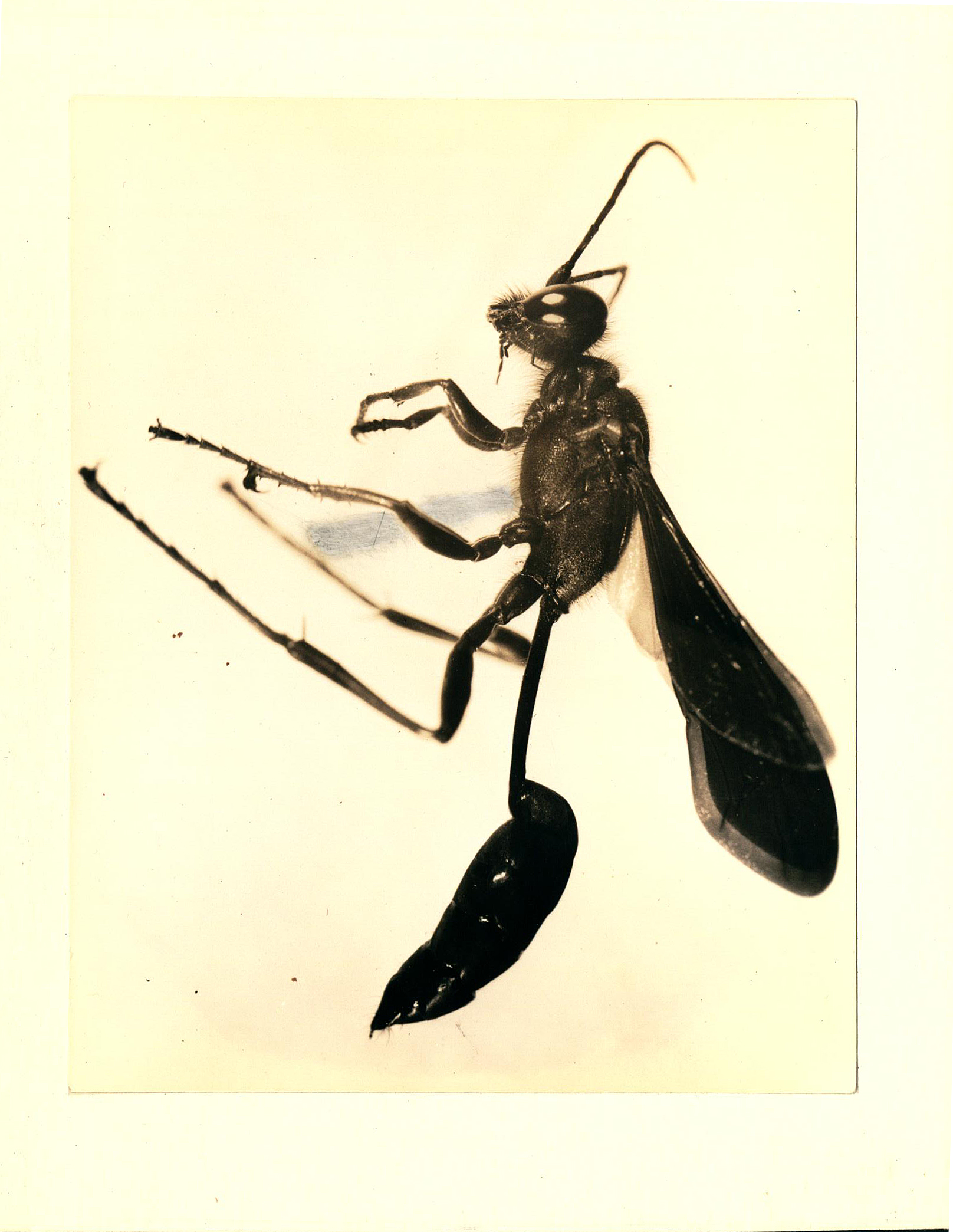
Wasp, photo by Stuart W. Frost

Frost then took a position at the Pennsylvania State College (now University) as an entomologist at the agricultural research station in Arendtsville, Pennsylvania, studying fruit tree pests. In 1923, he returned to Cornell for his graduate studies for another year, receiving his Ph.D. in 1925 with the thesis "A Study of Leafmining Diptera of North America" before moving back to the research station for 12 more years.

In 1937, Frost received a professorship at Penn State University's University Park campus, researching and developing light traps for insects. He subsequently began to organize a collection of insects within the Department of Zoology-Entomology with the hope of eventually creating an insect museum. In 1957, Frost retired as Professor Emeritus of Entomology and prepared Dr. K. C. Kim for succeeding him as curator of the museum.

Following his retirement from Penn State University, Frost moved to Florida and utilized his light traps to collect over 400,000 specimens at the Archbold Biological Station until 1971. He then returned to Penn State to volunteer at the Frost Entomological Museum, identifying insects and working on publications until his death on January 21, 1980.
