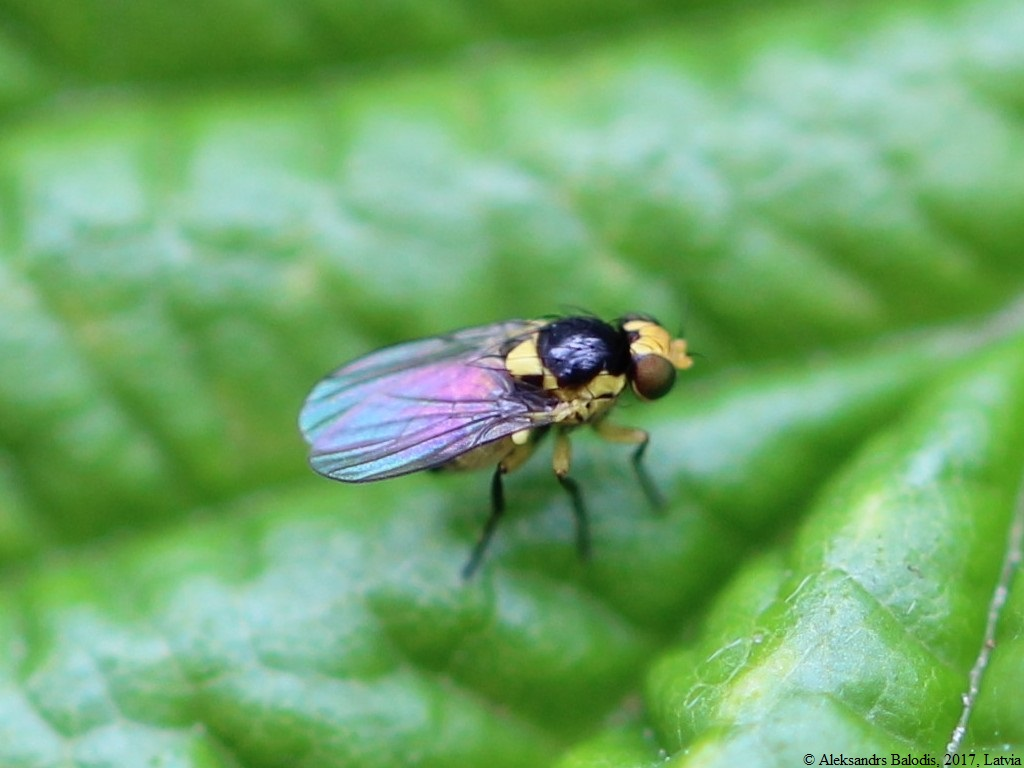
- Liriomyza pusilla

Scientific classification
- Kingdom: Animalia
- Phylum: Arthropoda
- Class: Insecta
- Order: Diptera
- Family: Agromyzidae
- Subfamily: Phytomyzinae
- Genus: Liriomyza; Mik, 1894

Type species
- Liriomyza urophorina Mik, 1894

Diversity
- at least 410 species

Synonyms
- Agrophila Lioy, 1864; Antineura Melander, 1913; Craspedomyza Enderlein, 1936; Galiomyza Spencer, 1981; Haplomyza Hendel, 1914; Lyriomyza Dam, Vuister, Bergshoeff, Vos & Meijden, 1995

= Liriomyza =

Genus of flies

Liriomyza is a genus of flies in the family Agromyzidae.

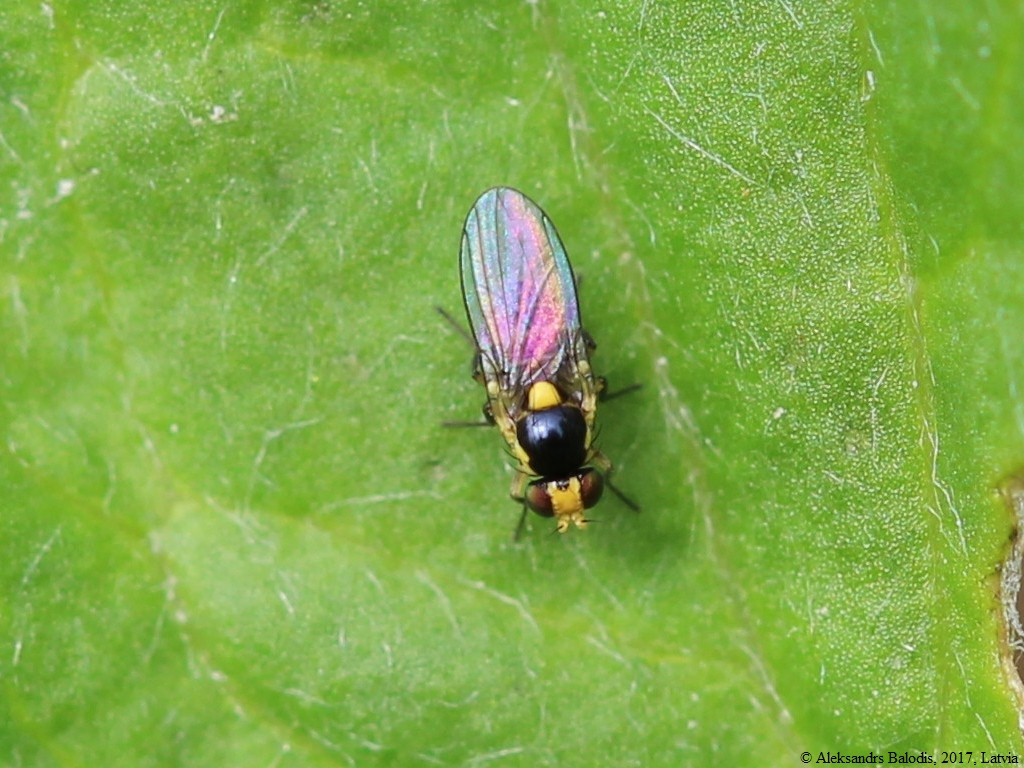
Liriomyza pusilla

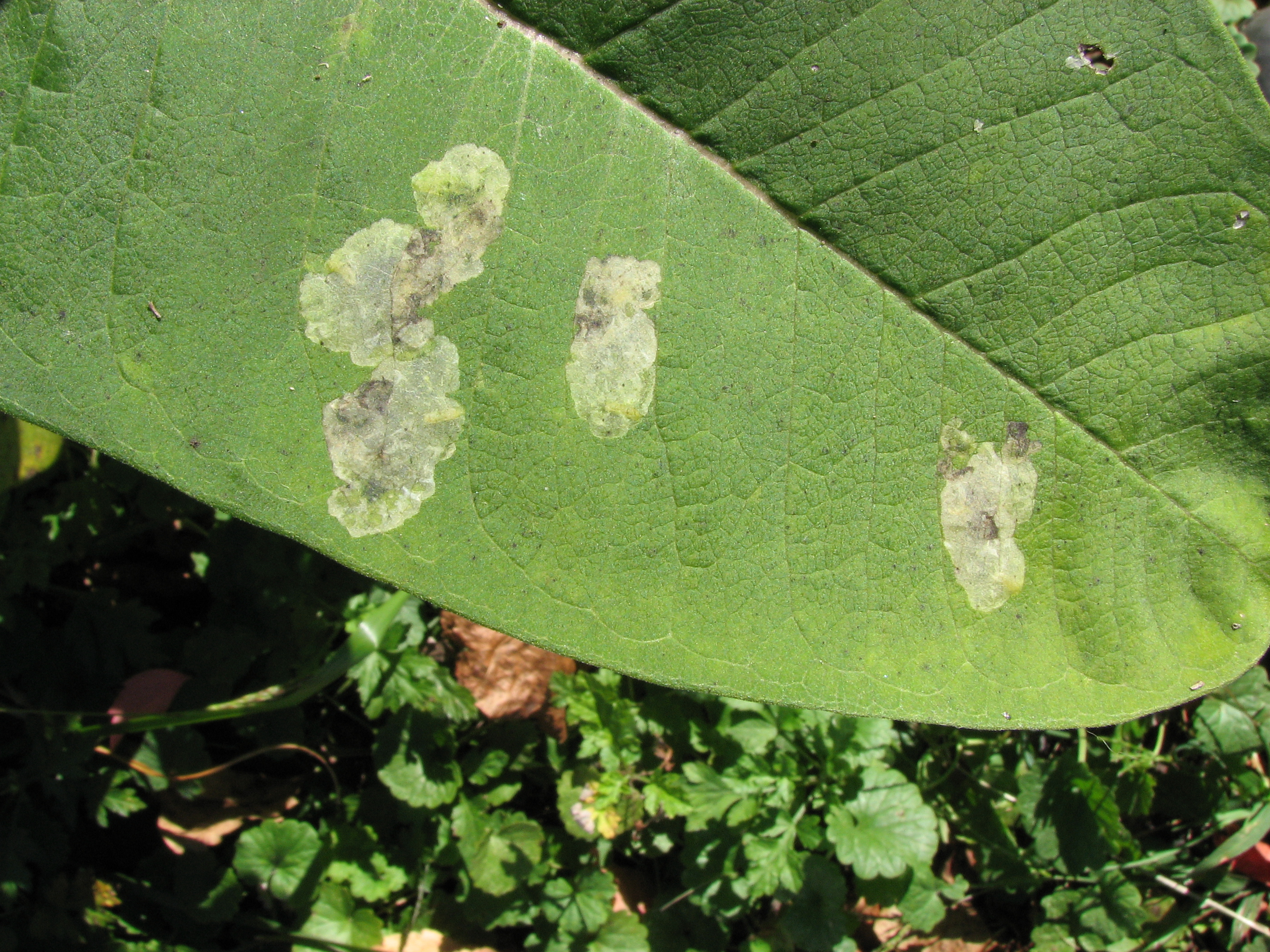
Leaf mines made by Liriomyza asclepiadis in milkweed leaf

== See also ==
- List of Liriomyza species
