= List of Agromyza species =

This is a list of 213 species in Agromyza, a genus of leaf miner flies in the family Agromyzidae.

== Agromyza species ==
- Agromyza abiens Zetterstedt, 1848^{c g}
- Agromyza abutilonis Spencer, 1959^{c g}
- Agromyza abyssinica Spencer, 1964^{c g}
- Agromyza alandensis Spencer, 1976^{c g}
- Agromyza albertensis Sehgal, 1968^{i c g}
- Agromyza albicornis Waltl, 1837^{c g}
- Agromyza albipennis Meigen, 1830^{i c g}
- Agromyza albipila Becker, 1908^{c g}
- Agromyza albitarsis Meigen, 1830^{i c g b}
- Agromyza alnibetulae Hendel, 1931^{c g}
- Agromyza alnivora Spencer, 1969^{c g}
- Agromyza alticeps Hendel, 1931^{c g}
- Agromyza alunulata Hendel, 1931^{c g}
- Agromyza ambigua Fallen, 1823^{i c g}
- Agromyza ambrosivora Spencer, 1969^{i c g b}
- Agromyza anderssoni Spencer, 1976^{c g}
- Agromyza animata Spencer, 1973^{c g}
- Agromyza antennalis Spencer, 1961^{c g}
- Agromyza anthracina Meigen, 1830^{c g}
- Agromyza anthrax Williston, 1896^{c g}
- Agromyza apfelbecki Strobl, 1902^{c g}
- Agromyza aprilina Malloch, 1915^{i c g}
- Agromyza aristata Malloch, 1915^{i c g b} (elm agromyzid leafminer)
- Agromyza artonia Garg, 1971^{c g}
- Agromyza audcenti Gibbs, 2004^{c g}
- Agromyza baetica Griffiths, 1963^{c g}
- Agromyza basilaris Waltl, 1837^{c g}
- Agromyza betulae Sasakawa, 1961^{c g}
- Agromyza bicaudata Hendel, 1920^{c g}
- Agromyza bicophaga Hering, 1925^{c g}
- Agromyza bispinata Spencer, 1969^{i c g}
- Agromyza bohemani Spencer, 1976^{c g}
- Agromyza brachypodii Griffiths, 1963^{c g}
- Agromyza brevispinata Sehgal, 1971^{i c g}
- Agromyza bromi Spencer, 1966^{c g}
- Agromyza brunnicosa Becker, 1908^{c g}
- Agromyza buhriella Hering, 1957^{c g}
- Agromyza burmensis Spencer, 1962^{c g}
- Agromyza canadensis Malloch, 1913^{i c g}
- Agromyza catherinae Spencer, 1959^{c g}
- Agromyza cercispinosa Sasakawa, 2005^{c g}
- Agromyza ceylonensis Spencer, 1961^{c g}
- Agromyza chillcotti Spencer, 1969^{i c g}
- Agromyza cinerascens Macquart, 1835^{c g}
- Agromyza comosa Spencer, 1962^{c g}
- Agromyza confusa Spencer, 1961^{c g}
- Agromyza conjuncta Spencer, 1966^{c g}
- Agromyza daryalings Singh & Ipe, 1973^{c g}
- Agromyza demeijerei Hendel, 1920^{c g}
- Agromyza dipsaci Hendel, 1927^{c g}
- Agromyza distans Hendel, 1931^{c g}
- Agromyza diversa Johnson, 1922^{i c g b}
- Agromyza drepanura Hering, 1930^{c g}
- Agromyza erodii Hering, 1927^{c g}
- Agromyza erodii hering , 1927^{g}
- Agromyza erythrocephala Hendel, 1920^{c g}
- Agromyza eyeni Spencer, 1959^{c g}
- Agromyza facilis Spencer, 1969^{i c g}
- Agromyza felleri Hering, 1941^{c g}
- Agromyza ferruginosa Van der Wulp, 1871^{c g}
- Agromyza ferruginosa van-der Wulp, 1871^{g}
- Agromyza filipendulae Spencer, 1976^{c g}
- Agromyza flava Sousa, Couri & In Press^{c g}
- Agromyza flaviceps Fallén, 1823^{c g}
- Agromyza flavipennis Hendel, 1920^{c g}
- Agromyza flavisquama Malloch, 1914^{c g}
- Agromyza fragariae Malloch, 1913^{i c g}
- Agromyza frontella (Rondani, 1874)^{i c g b} (alfalfa blotch leafminer)
- Agromyza frontosa (Becker, 1908)^{c g}
- Agromyza fusca Spencer, 1963^{c g}
- Agromyza graminacea Spencer, 1985^{c g}
- Agromyza graminicola Hendel, 1931^{c g}
- Agromyza granadensis Spencer, 1972^{c g}
- Agromyza haldwaniensis Garg, 1971^{c g}
- Agromyza hardyi Spencer, 1986^{i c g}
- Agromyza hendeli Griffiths, 1963^{c g}
- Agromyza hiemalis Becker, 1908^{c g}
- Agromyza hierroensis Spencer, 1957^{c g}
- Agromyza hockingi Spencer, 1969^{i c g}
- Agromyza hordei Spencer, 1961^{c g}
- Agromyza humuli Hering, 1924^{c g}
- Agromyza idaeiana Hardy, 1853^{g b}
- Agromyza igniceps Hendel, 1920^{c g}
- Agromyza illustris Spencer, 1977^{c g}
- Agromyza infusca Spencer, 1959^{c g}
- Agromyza insolens Spencer, 1963^{c g}
- Agromyza intermittens Becker, 1907^{c g}
- Agromyza invaria (Walker, 1857)^{c g}
- Agromyza isolata Malloch, 1913^{i c g b}
- Agromyza johannae de Meijere, 1924^{c g}
- Agromyza kiefferi Tavares, 1901^{c g}
- Agromyza kincaidi Malloch, 1913^{i c g}
- Agromyza kolobowai Hendel, 1931^{c g}
- Agromyza kumaonensis Sehgal, 1986^{c g}
- Agromyza kusumae Garg, 1971^{c g}
- Agromyza lapponica Hendel, 1931^{c g}
- Agromyza lathyri Hendel, 1923^{c g}
- Agromyza latifrons Zlobin, 2001^{c g}
- Agromyza latipennis Malloch, 1914^{c g}
- Agromyza leechi Spencer, 1969^{i c g}
- Agromyza leptinomentula Sasakawa, 2005^{c g}
- Agromyza liriomyzina Zlobin, 1998^{c g}
- Agromyza lithospermi Spencer, 1963^{c g}
- Agromyza lucida Hendel, 1920^{i c g}
- Agromyza lunulata Sasakawa, 1956^{c g}
- Agromyza luteifrons Strobl, 1906^{c g}
- Agromyza luteitarsis (Rondani, 1875)^{g}
- Agromyza lutetarsis (Rondani, 1875)^{c g}
- Agromyza lyneborgi Spencer, 1976^{c g}
- Agromyza malaisei Spencer, 1962^{c g}
- Agromyza malvaceivora Seguy, 1951^{c g}
- Agromyza marionae Griffiths, 1963^{c g}
- Agromyza marmorensis Spencer, 1969^{i c g}
- Agromyza masculina Sehgal, 1968^{i c g}
- Agromyza masoni Spencer, 1969^{i c g}
- Agromyza megaepistoma Sasakawa, 2005^{c g}
- Agromyza megalopsis Hering, 1933^{c g}
- Agromyza mellita Spencer, 1977^{c g}
- Agromyza microproboscis Hendel, 1931^{c g}
- Agromyza mobilis Meigen, 1830^{c g}
- Agromyza morivora Sasakawa & Fukuhara, 1965^{c g}
- Agromyza munduleae (Seguy, 1951)^{c g}
- Agromyza myosotidis Kaltenbach, 1864^{c g}
- Agromyza myostidis Kaltenbach, 1864^{c g}
- Agromyza nana Meigen, 1830^{c g}
- Agromyza nearctica Sehgal, 1971^{i c g}
- Agromyza nevadensis Spencer, 1981^{i c g}
- Agromyza nigrella (Rondani, 1875)^{i c g}
- Agromyza nigrescens Hendel, 1920^{c g}
- Agromyza nigripes Meigen, 1830^{i c g}
- Agromyza nigrociliata Hendel, 1931^{c g}
- Agromyza obesa Malloch, 1914^{c g}
- Agromyza obscuritarsis (Rondani, 1875)^{g}
- Agromyza occulta Waltl, 1837^{c g}
- Agromyza ocularis Spencer, 1961^{c g}
- Agromyza oliverensis Spencer, 1969^{i c g}
- Agromyza oliviae Spencer, 1959^{c g}
- Agromyza orobi Hendel, 1920^{c g}
- Agromyza oryzae (Munakata, 1910)^{c g}
- Agromyza pagana Spencer, 1986^{i c g}
- Agromyza paganella Henshaw, 1989^{c g}
- Agromyza pallidifrons Spencer, 1959^{c g}
- Agromyza pallidiseta Malloch, 1924^{i c g}
- Agromyza panici Meijere, 1934^{c g}
- Agromyza papuensis Sasakawa, 1963^{c g}
- Agromyza parca L.^{i c g b}
- Agromyza parilis Spencer, 1986^{i c g}
- Agromyza parvicornis (Valenciennes, 1836)^{i c g b} (corn blotch leafminer)
- Agromyza pascuum Waltl, 1837^{c g}
- Agromyza paucineura Zlobin, 2001^{c g}
- Agromyza penniseti Spencer, 1959^{c g}
- Agromyza pennisetivora Spencer, 1961^{c g}
- Agromyza phragmitidis Hendel, 1922^{c g}
- Agromyza phylloposthia Sasakawa, 2008^{c g}
- Agromyza pittodes Hendel, 1931^{c g}
- Agromyza plaumanni Spencer, 1963^{c g}
- Agromyza plebeia Malloch, 1914^{c g}
- Agromyza polygoni Hering, 1941^{c g}
- Agromyza potenillae (Kaltenbach, 1864)^{c g}
- Agromyza potentillae (Kaltenbach, 1864)^{i c g}
- Agromyza pratensis Waltl, 1837^{c g}
- Agromyza prespana Spencer, 1957^{c g}
- Agromyza proxima Spencer, 1969^{i c g}
- Agromyza pseudoreptans Nowakowski, 1967^{i c g b}
- Agromyza pseudorufipes Nowakowski, 1964^{g}
- Agromyza pseudoruifpes Nowakowski, 1964^{c g}
- Agromyza pudica (G. B. Sowerby I, 1828)^{i c g b}
- Agromyza pulla Meigen, 1830^{c g}
- Agromyza quadriseta Zlobin, 2001^{c g}
- Agromyza reptans Fallen, 1823^{i c g b}
- Agromyza riparia Van der Wulp, 1871^{g}
- Agromyza rondensis Strobl, 1900^{c g}
- Agromyza rubi Brischke, 1881^{c g}
- Agromyza rubiginosa Griffiths, 1955^{c g}
- Agromyza ruficornis Macquart, 1835^{g}
- Agromyza rufipes Meigen, 1830^{c g}
- Agromyza sahyadriae Ipe, 1971^{c g}
- Agromyza salicina Hendel, 1922^{c g}
- Agromyza schlingerella Spencer, 1981^{i c g}
- Agromyza serratimentula Sasakawa, 1992^{c g}
- Agromyza solita Wulp, 1897^{c g}
- Agromyza somereni Spencer, 1959^{c g}
- Agromyza spenceri Griffiths, 1963^{c g}
- Agromyza spinisera Sasakawa & Fan, 1985^{c g}
- Agromyza spiraeoidarum Hering, 1954^{g}
- Agromyza spiraeoidearum Hering, 1957^{i c g}
- Agromyza stackelbergi Hendel, 1931^{c g}
- Agromyza subantennalis Sasakawa, 1963^{c g}
- Agromyza subnigripes Malloch, 1913^{i c g}
- Agromyza sulfuriceps Loew, 1872^{i c g b}
- Agromyza susannae Spencer, 1959^{c g}
- Agromyza tacita Spencer, 1969^{i c g}
- Agromyza terebrans Bezzi & Tavares, 1916^{c g}
- Agromyza trebinjensis Strobl, 1900^{c g}
- Agromyza tularensis Spencer, 1981^{i c g}
- Agromyza ugandae Spencer, 1985^{c g}
- Agromyza uniseta Spencer, 1959^{c g}
- Agromyza uralensis Zlobin, 2000^{c g}
- Agromyza utahensis Spencer, 1986^{i c g}
- Agromyza valdorensis Spencer, 1969^{i c g}
- Agromyza varicornis Strobl, 1900^{c g}
- Agromyza varifrons Rohwer, 1909^{i c g b}
- Agromyza venezolana Spencer, 1963^{c g}
- Agromyza venusta Spencer, 1977^{c g}
- Agromyza verdensis Spencer, 1959^{c g}
- Agromyza viciae Kaltenbach, 1872^{c g}
- Agromyza vicifoliae Hering, 1932^{c g}
- Agromyza virginiensis Spencer, 1977^{i c g}
- Agromyza vitrinervis Malloch, 1915^{c g}
- Agromyza vockerothi (Meigen, 1822)^{i c g b}
- Agromyza wistariae Sasakawa, 1961^{c g}
- Agromyza woerzi Groschke, 1957^{c g}
- Agromyza yanonis (Matsumura, 1916)^{c g}

Data sources: i = ITIS, c = Catalogue of Life, g = GBIF, b = Bugguide.net
