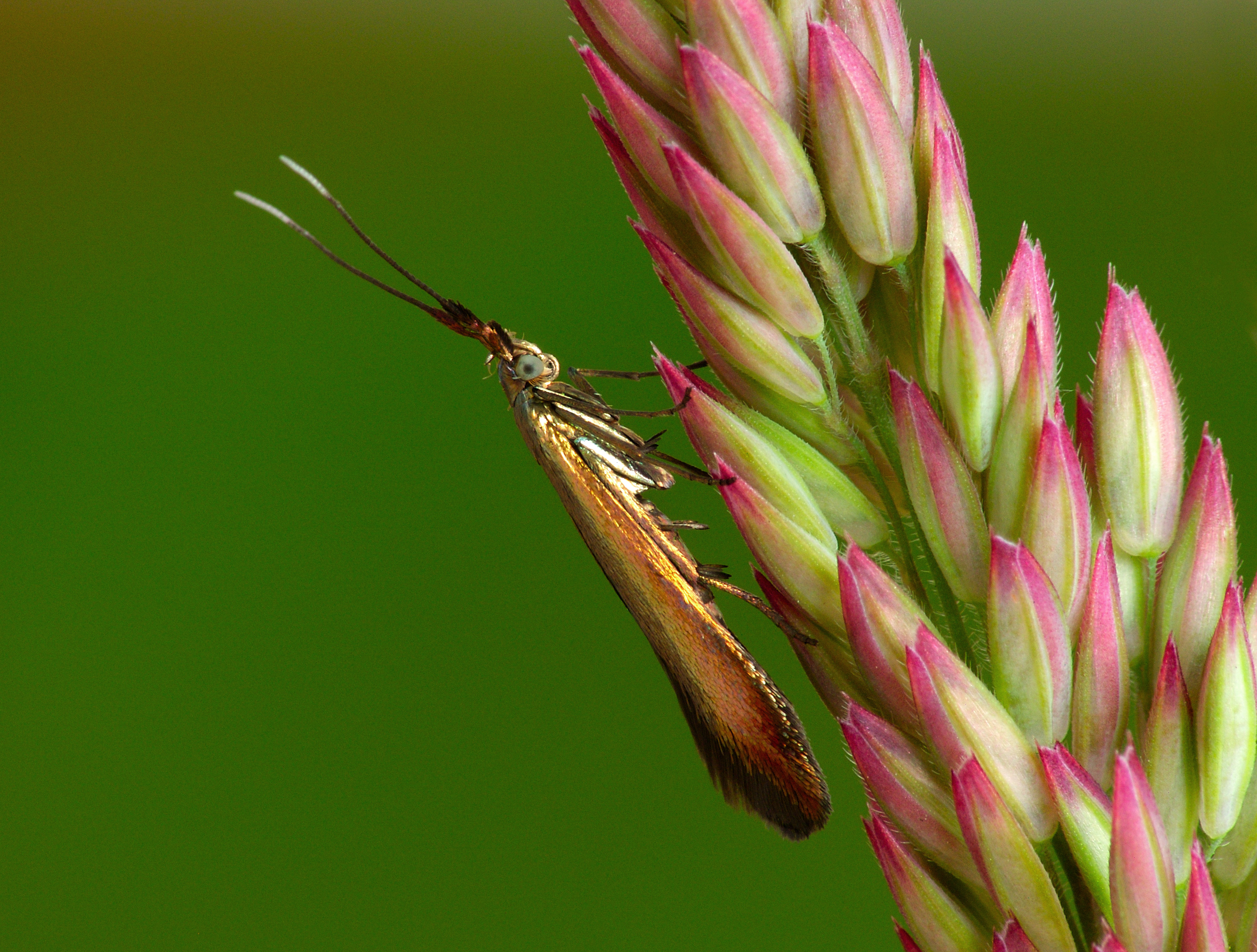

Scientific classification
- Kingdom: Animalia
- Phylum: Arthropoda
- Class: Insecta
- Order: Lepidoptera
- Family: Coleophoridae
- Genus: Coleophora
- Species: C. trifolii

Binomial name
- Coleophora trifolii (Curtis, 1832)

Synonyms
- List: Damophila trifolii Curtis, 1832; Plutella chalybaella Costa, 1836; Coleophora melilotella Scott, 1861; Coleophora frischella aurata Toll, 1960; Coleophora trifolii aurata Toll, 1960

= Coleophora trifolii =

Species of moth

Coleophora trifolii, the trefoil thick-horned tinea or large clover case-bearer, is a moth of the family Coleophoridae. It is found in Europe, North Africa, Asia Minor, Afghanistan and North America.

The wingspan is 15–20 mm. A metallic bronze green Coleophora with pale yellow scales fringing its eyes. Certain identification relies on microscopic examination of the genitalia.

Adults are on wing from June to July. They are active during the day.

The larvae feed from July to September on the seeds of Melilotus species (including Melilotus albus, Melilotus officinalis and Melilotus altissima).
