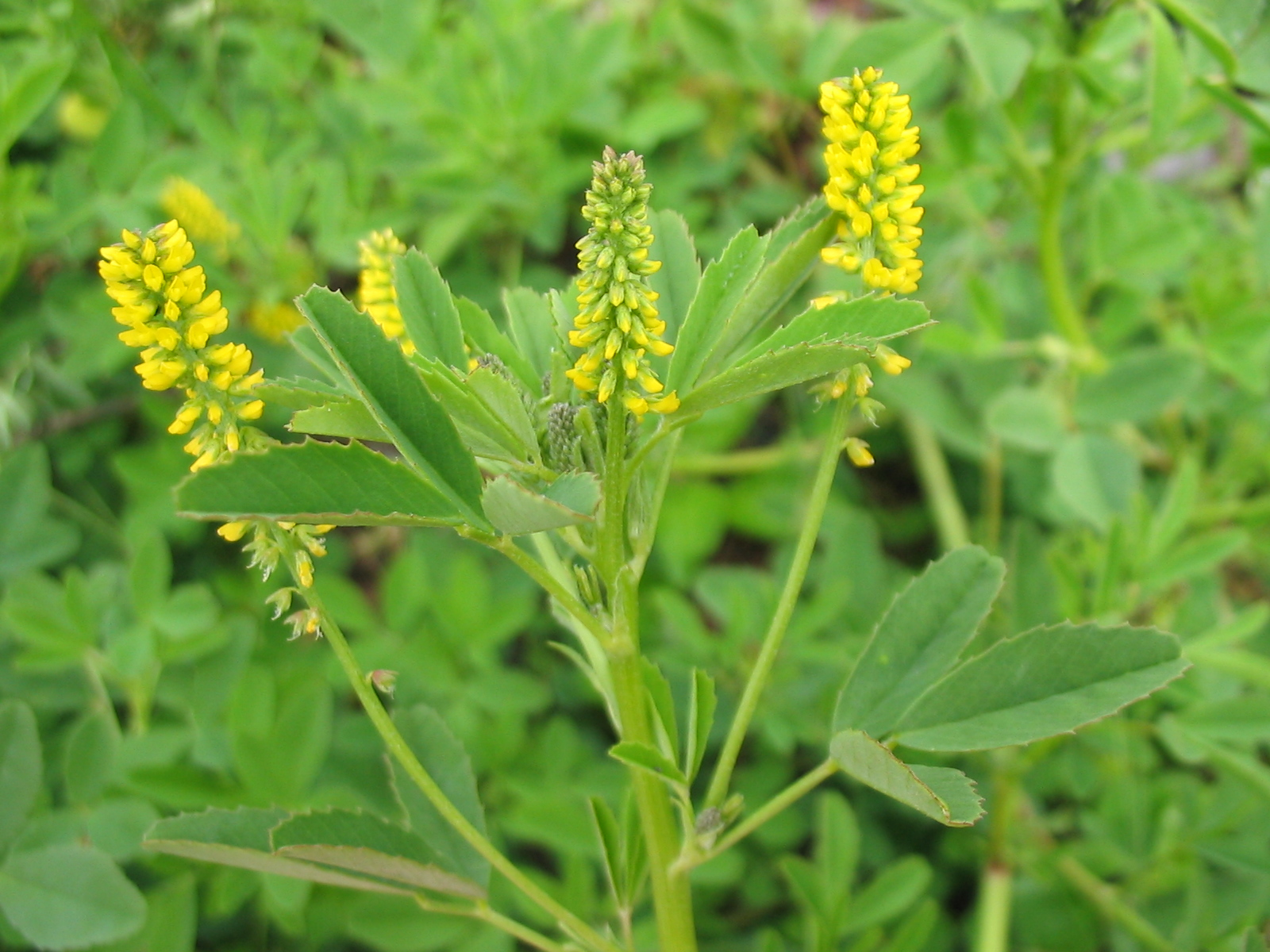

Scientific classification
- Kingdom: Plantae
- Clade: Tracheophytes
- Clade: Angiosperms
- Clade: Eudicots
- Clade: Rosids
- Order: Fabales
- Family: Fabaceae
- Subfamily: Faboideae
- Genus: Melilotus
- Species: M. indicus

Binomial name
- Melilotus indicus (L.) All.

Varieties
- M. indicus var. indicus M. indicus var. tommasinii

Synonyms
- Melilotus parviflorus Desf. Melilotus tommasinii Jord. Trifolium indicum L.

= Melilotus indicus =

Species of flowering plant

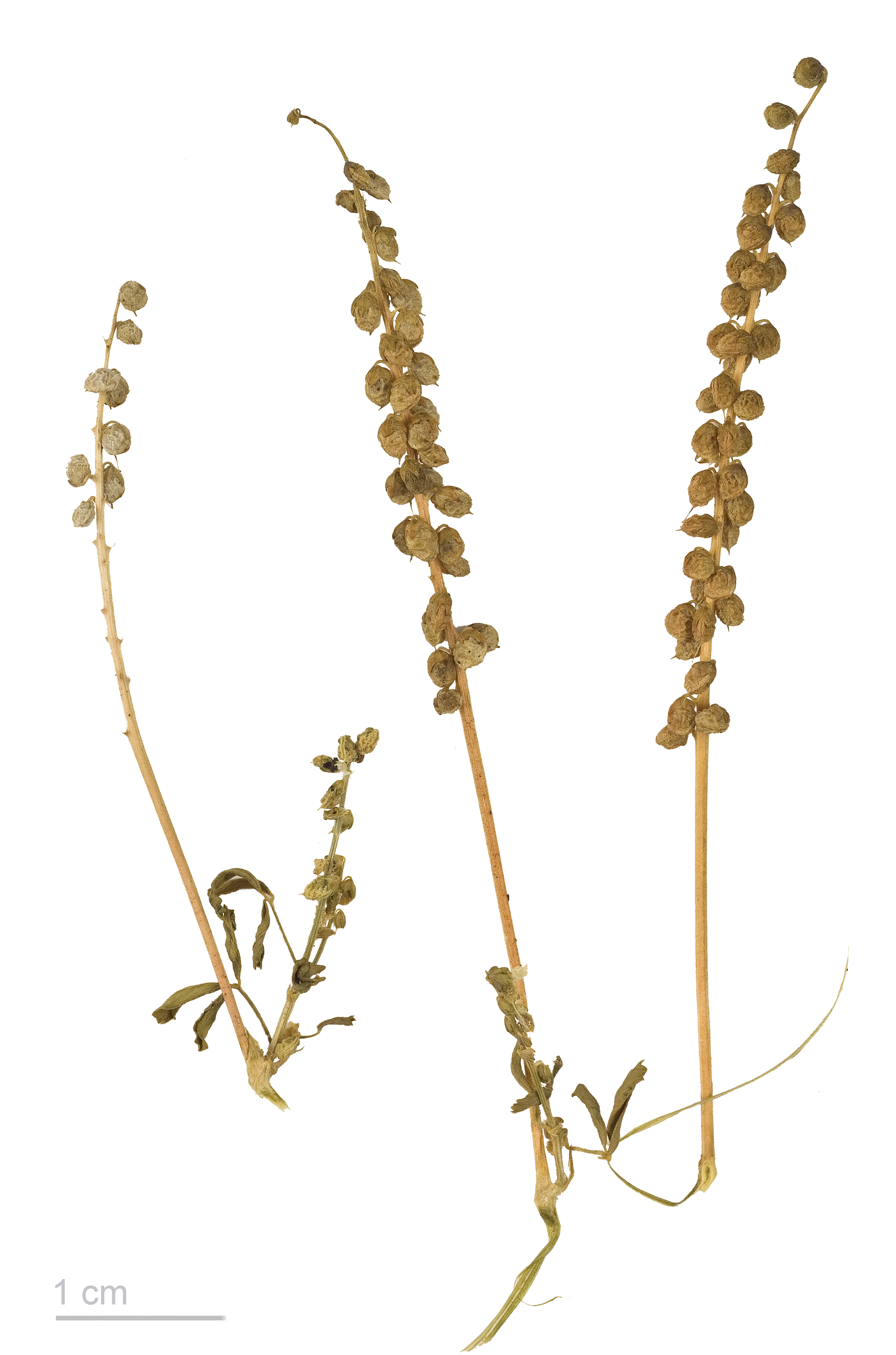
Melilotus indicus - MHNT

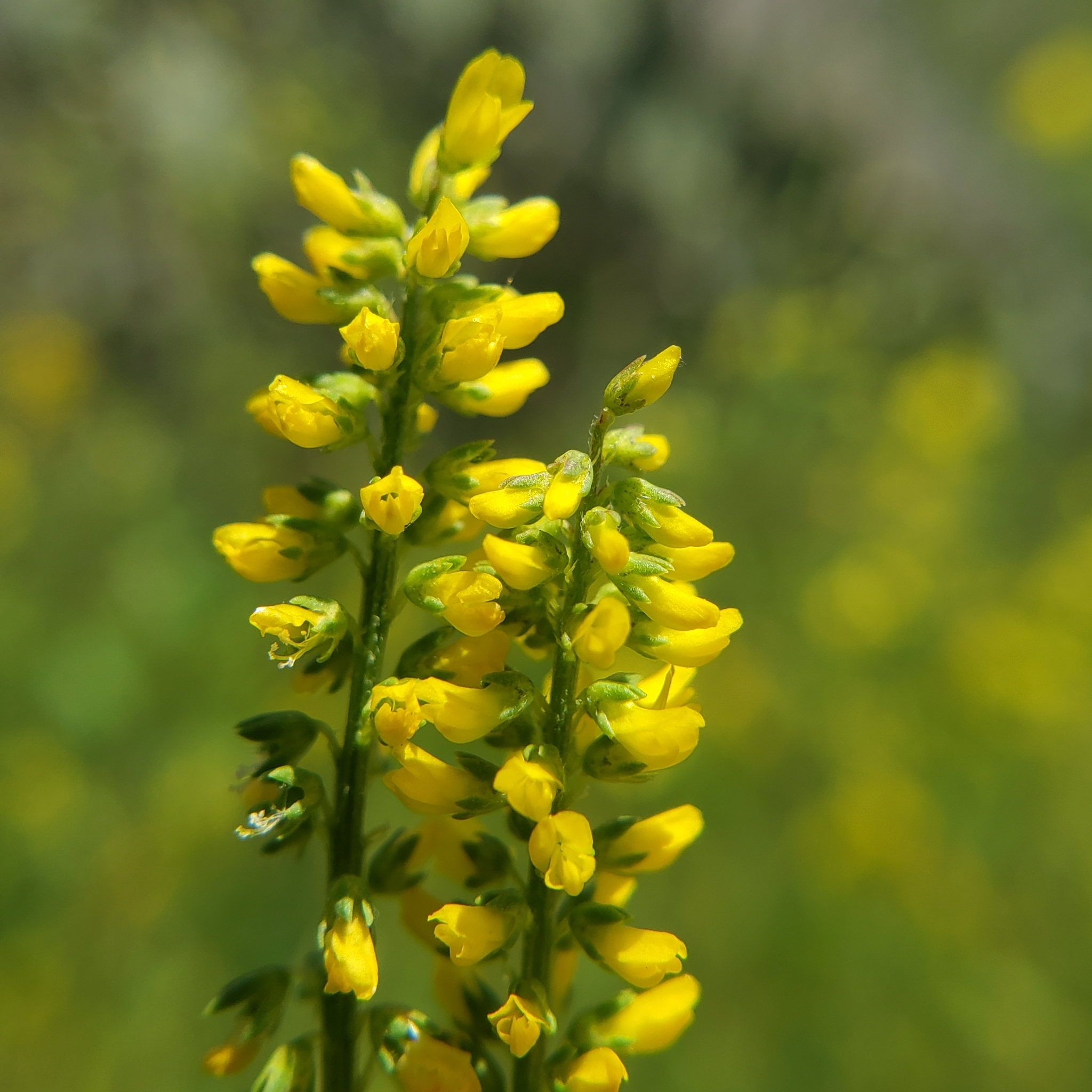
Close up view of M. indicus flowers

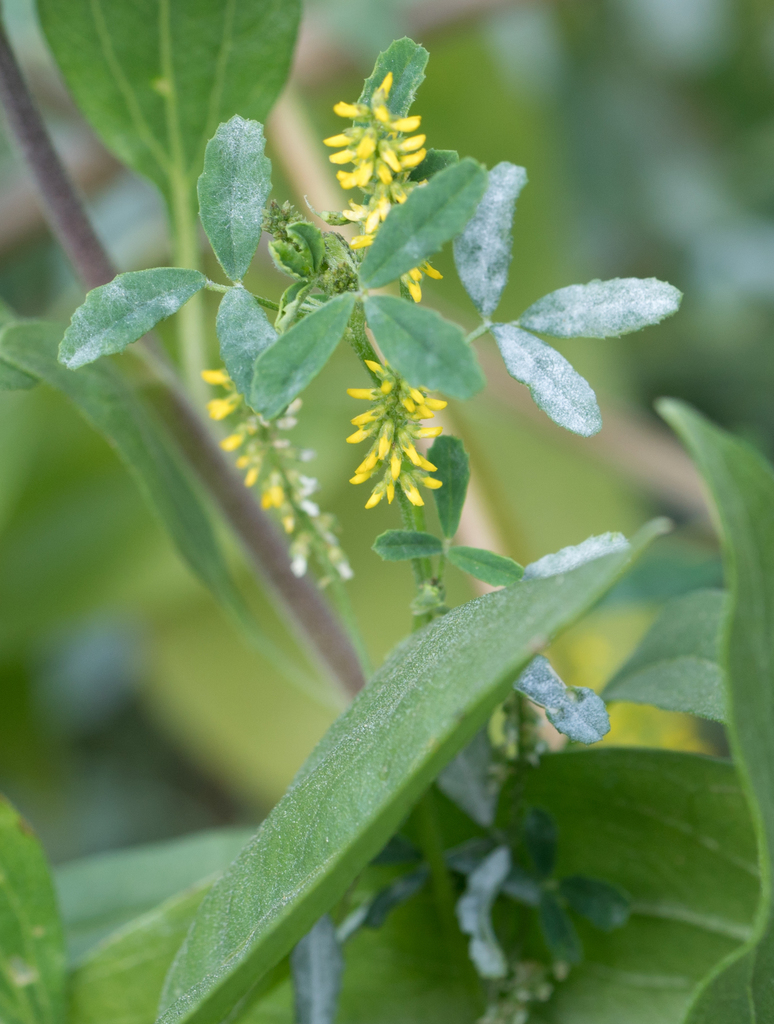
Foliar powdery mildew infection

Melilotus indicus, sometimes incorrectly written Melilotus indica, is a yellow-flowered herb in the Fabaceae family. It is native to northern Africa, Europe and Asia, but naturalized throughout much of the rest of the world's temperate climate zones. It is a commonly occurring weed in disturbed habitats, with historical uses for forage and medicine.

Common names in English include sweet clover (or sweet-clover), sour clover (sour-clover, sourclover), Indian sweet-clover, annual yellow sweetclover, Bokhara clover, small-flowered sweet clover, common melilot, small-flowered melilot, small melilot, sweet melilot, Californian lucerne and Hexham scent. In Australia and New Zealand, where it is naturalized, it is sometimes called King Island melilot or King Island clover.

== Description ==
M. indicus is an annual herb from 10 to 50 centimetres (3.9 to 19.7 inches) in height (rarely to one meter), with compound leaves of trifoliate leaflets. Leaf edges are sharply dentate. The leaves have a sweet, cloying scent when crushed.

The small yellow flowers are 2–3 mm and are borne in dense racemes. The flowers produce a hairless pod of similar length. While similar in overall appearance to Melilotus officinalis, M. indicus is typically smaller in both stem height and flower size.

== Taxonomy ==
It was first published as Trifolium indicum by Carl Linnaeus in his 1753 Species plantarum. It was transferred into Melilotus by Carlo Allioni in 1785.

== Distribution and habitat ==
It has a wide native distribution, ranging from Macaronesia and northern Africa, through Europe, and into temperate and tropical Asia. It is naturalized throughout most of the rest of the world, including the United Kingdom, the United States, South America, Australia and New Zealand. In its introduced regions, it is frequently found along fields, roadsides, and other disturbed areas, and is typically considered a weed.

Melilotus indicus has been identified as halophyte, maintaining high germination and growth rates in saline substrates. It utilizes salt inclusion as its main tolerance mechanism, which allows the plant to accumulate high levels of salt ions.

== Ecology ==
Melilotus species are typically insect pollinated, but specific species have not been observed for M. indicus.

In its introduced regions in the United States, it is often considered a weed, but is not as invasive as its close relative Melilotus officinalis, which more aggressively outcompetes native prairie species.

M. indicus can be infected by the powdery mildew species Erysiphe trifoliorum, which also infects plants in the Lathyrus, Medicago, Trifolium, and Vicia genera.

== Uses and economic importance ==
Melilotus indicus is used as a source of nectar for bees, as forage, and as a soil improver through its nitrogen fixing properties. As a salt tolerant species, it is a particularly useful forage crop where other legumes cannot grow. By 1907, it was in use at King Island for cattle fodder, explaining its Australian name.

Melilotus indicus has been used as a traditional medicine for its analgesic, antioxidant, aperitive, emollient, and anti-inflammatory properties. It is typical of plants in the Melilotus genus, containing coumarins, compounds with anticoagulant properties. M. indicus extract demonstrates cytotoxic effects against multiple types of cancer cells.
