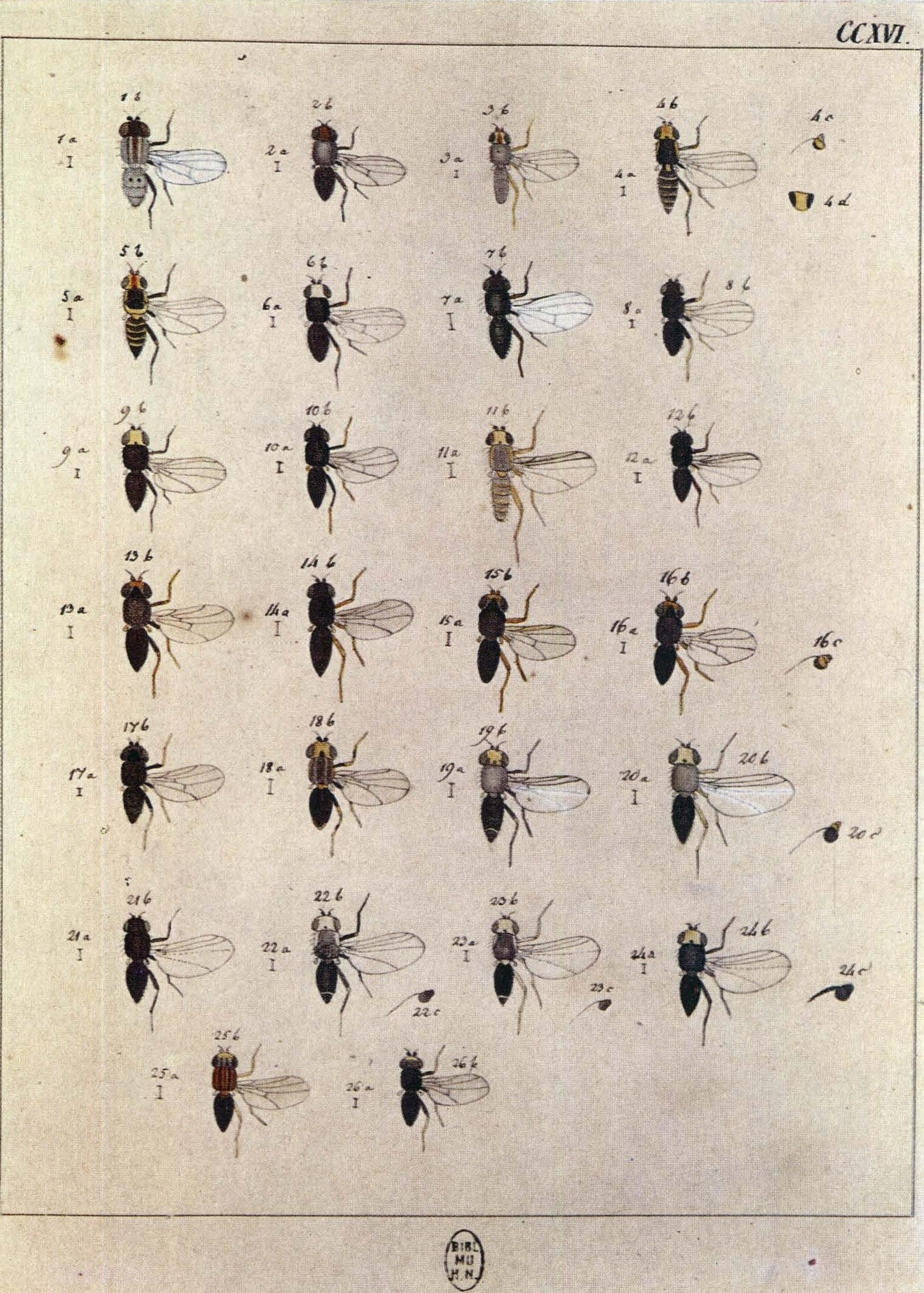
- Agromyza nana in Europäischen Zweiflügeligen (figure 2)

Scientific classification
- Kingdom: Animalia
- Phylum: Arthropoda
- Class: Insecta
- Order: Diptera
- Family: Agromyzidae
- Genus: Agromyza
- Species: A. nana

Binomial name
- Agromyza nana Meigen, 1830

= Agromyza nana =

Species of fly

Agromyza nana is a species of fly in the family Agromyzidae. It is found in the Palearctic. Description of imago-Interocular space red. Antennomeres 1 and II red. Peristoma and palps black. Dorsocentral bristles : 1 +3 subequal; acrostics in four rows. Legs black, knees red. Abdomen black with lighter pruinosity than the thorax. Long.:1,75-2,5 mm. The larva mines Trifolium pratense, Melilotus altissima, Medicago.
