= Agromyza reptans =

Scientific classification
- Domain: Eukaryota
- Kingdom: Animalia
- Phylum: Arthropoda
- Class: Insecta
- Order: Diptera
- Family: Agromyzidae
- Genus: Agromyza
- Species: A. reptans

Binomial name
- Agromyza reptans Fallen, 1823

Synonyms
- Agromyza haplacme Steyskal, 1972

Species of fly

Agromyza reptans is a species of leaf miner fly in the family Agromyzidae.
