= Agromyza frontella =

Scientific classification
- Kingdom: Animalia
- Phylum: Arthropoda
- Class: Insecta
- Order: Diptera
- Family: Agromyzidae
- Genus: Agromyza
- Species: A. frontella

Binomial name
- Agromyza frontella (Rondani, 1874)

Synonyms
- Domomyza frontella Rondani, 1874

Species of fly

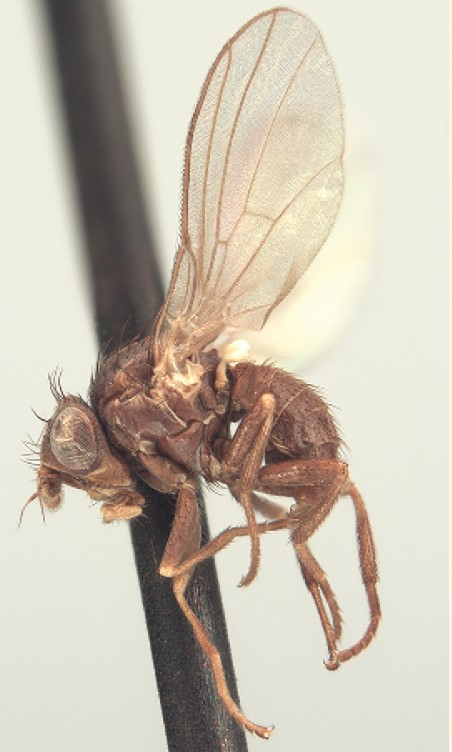
Agromyza frontella

Agromyza frontella, the alfalfa blotch leafminer, is a species of leaf miner flies in the family Agromyzidae. Larval instars of this species engage in cannibalism.
