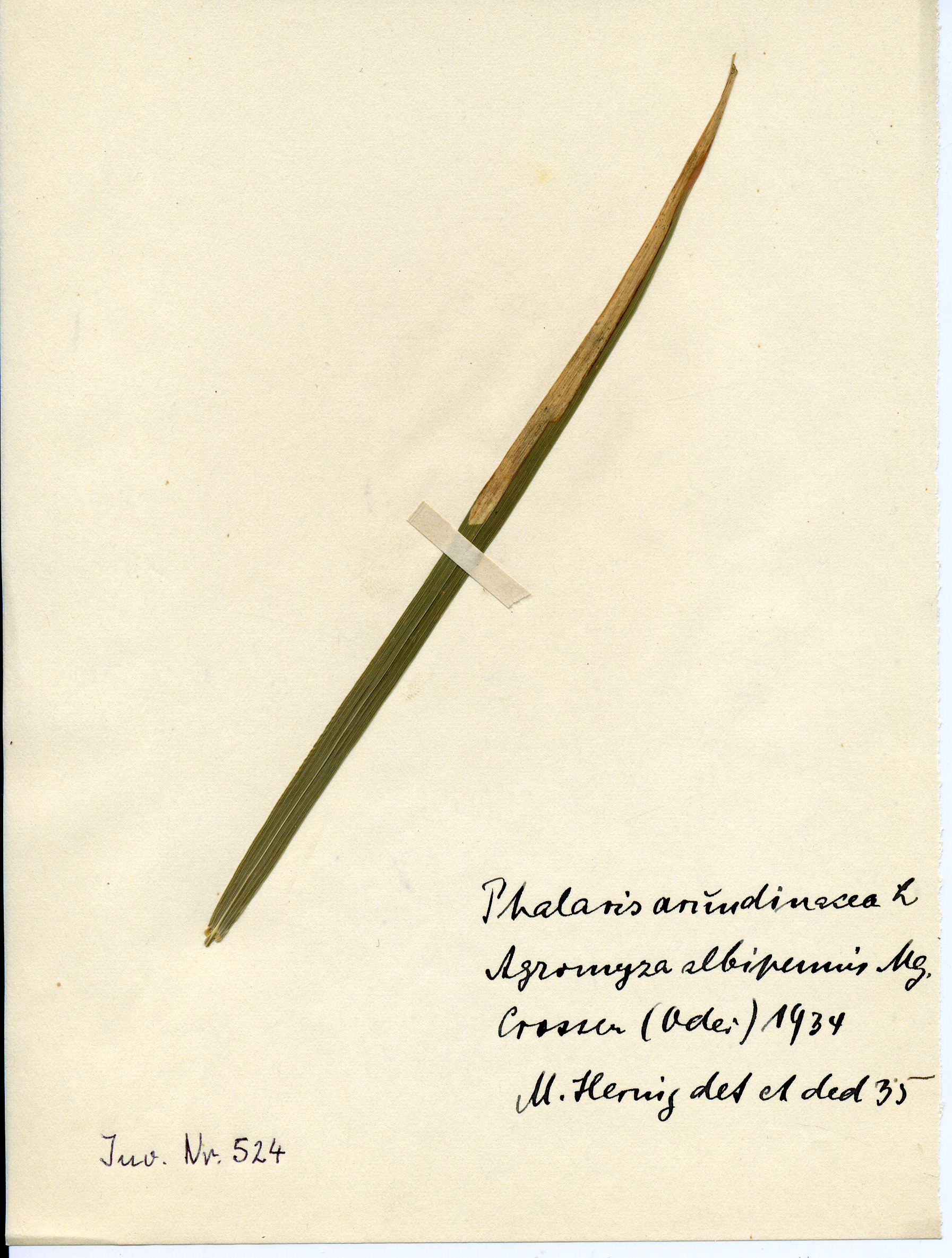
- Agromyza albipennis leafmine on Phalaris arundinacea

Scientific classification
- Kingdom: Animalia
- Phylum: Arthropoda
- Class: Insecta
- Order: Diptera
- Family: Agromyzidae
- Genus: Agromyza
- Species: A. albipennis

Binomial name
- Agromyza albipennis Meigen, 1830

= Agromyza albipennis =

Species of fly

Agromyza albipennis is a species of fly in the family Agromyzidae. It is found in the Palearctic. Wings milky. Squamae with white borders and vestiture. Last segment of vein 5 (Cu A1 equal to twice the length of the precedent.- Long. : 2–3 mm. The larvae mines Poaceae
