= Agromyza diversa =

Scientific classification
- Domain: Eukaryota
- Kingdom: Animalia
- Phylum: Arthropoda
- Class: Insecta
- Order: Diptera
- Family: Agromyzidae
- Genus: Agromyza
- Species: A. diversa

Binomial name
- Agromyza diversa Johnson, 1922

Species of fly

Agromyza diversa is a species of leaf miner flies in the family Agromyzidae.
