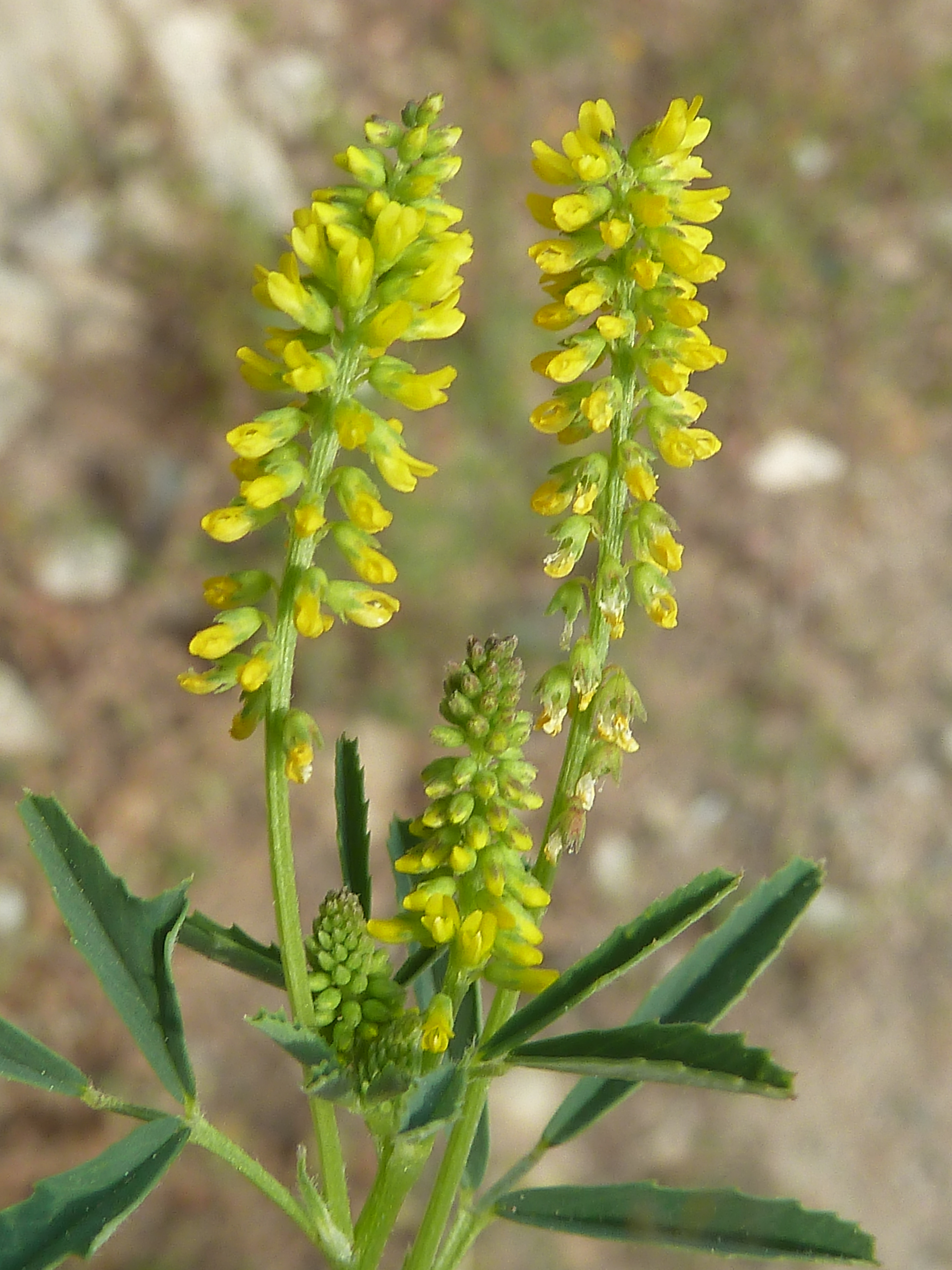
- Melilotus sulcatus

Scientific classification
- Kingdom: Plantae
- Clade: Embryophytes
- Clade: Tracheophytes
- Clade: Spermatophytes
- Clade: Angiosperms
- Clade: Eudicots
- Clade: Rosids
- Order: Fabales
- Family: Fabaceae
- Subfamily: Faboideae
- Genus: Melilotus
- Species: M. sulcatus

Binomial name
- Melilotus sulcatus Desf.

= Melilotus sulcatus =

Species of flowering plant

Melilotus sulcatus, the furrowed melilot or Mediterranean sweetclover, is a species of the genus Melilotus, belonging to the pea family; Fabaceae or Papilionaceae.

It is distributed in Southern Europe, an annual plant between 10 and 40 cm (3.9 and 16 in) high. The stem leaves are grooved. The flowers are very small; 3–5 mm long, in bloom from June until August. The pods are 3–3.5 mm long, with bowline veins.
