= Agromyza ambrosivora =

Scientific classification
- Domain: Eukaryota
- Kingdom: Animalia
- Phylum: Arthropoda
- Class: Insecta
- Order: Diptera
- Family: Agromyzidae
- Genus: Agromyza
- Species: A. ambrosivora

Binomial name
- Agromyza ambrosivora Spencer, 1969

Species of fly

Agromyza ambrosivora is a species of leaf miner fly in the family Agromyzidae.
