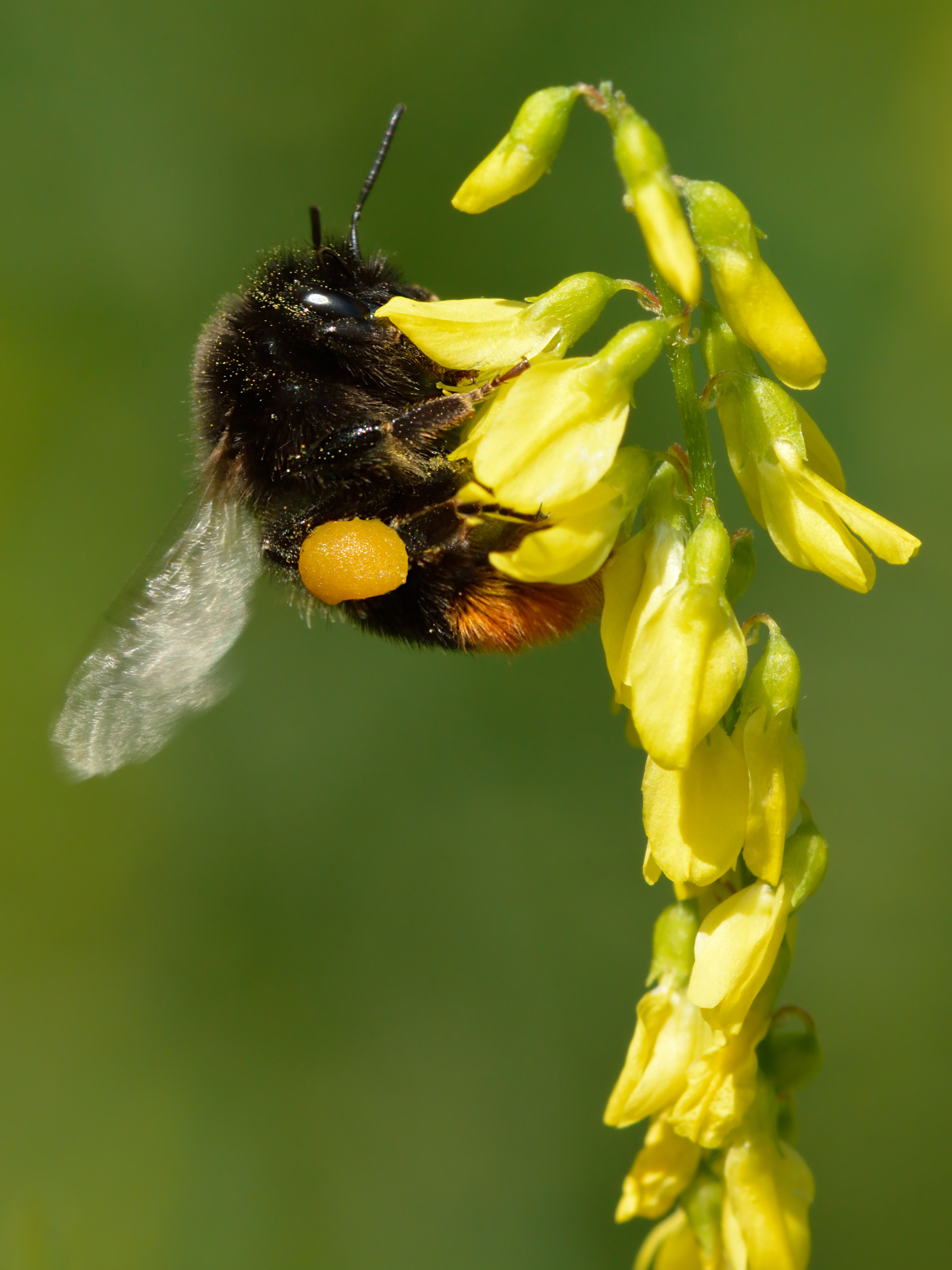
- Melilotus officinalis

Scientific classification
- Kingdom: Plantae
- Clade: Tracheophytes
- Clade: Angiosperms
- Clade: Eudicots
- Clade: Rosids
- Order: Fabales
- Family: Fabaceae
- Subfamily: Faboideae
- Tribe: Trifolieae
- Genus: Melilotus; Mill.

Type species
- Melilotus officinalis (L.) Lam.

Species
- See text

Synonyms
- Brachylobus Dulac (1867); Melilothus Homem. (1819); Melilota Medik. (1787); Meliotus Steud. (1841); Sertula O. Ktze. (1891)

= Melilotus =

Genus of flowering plants

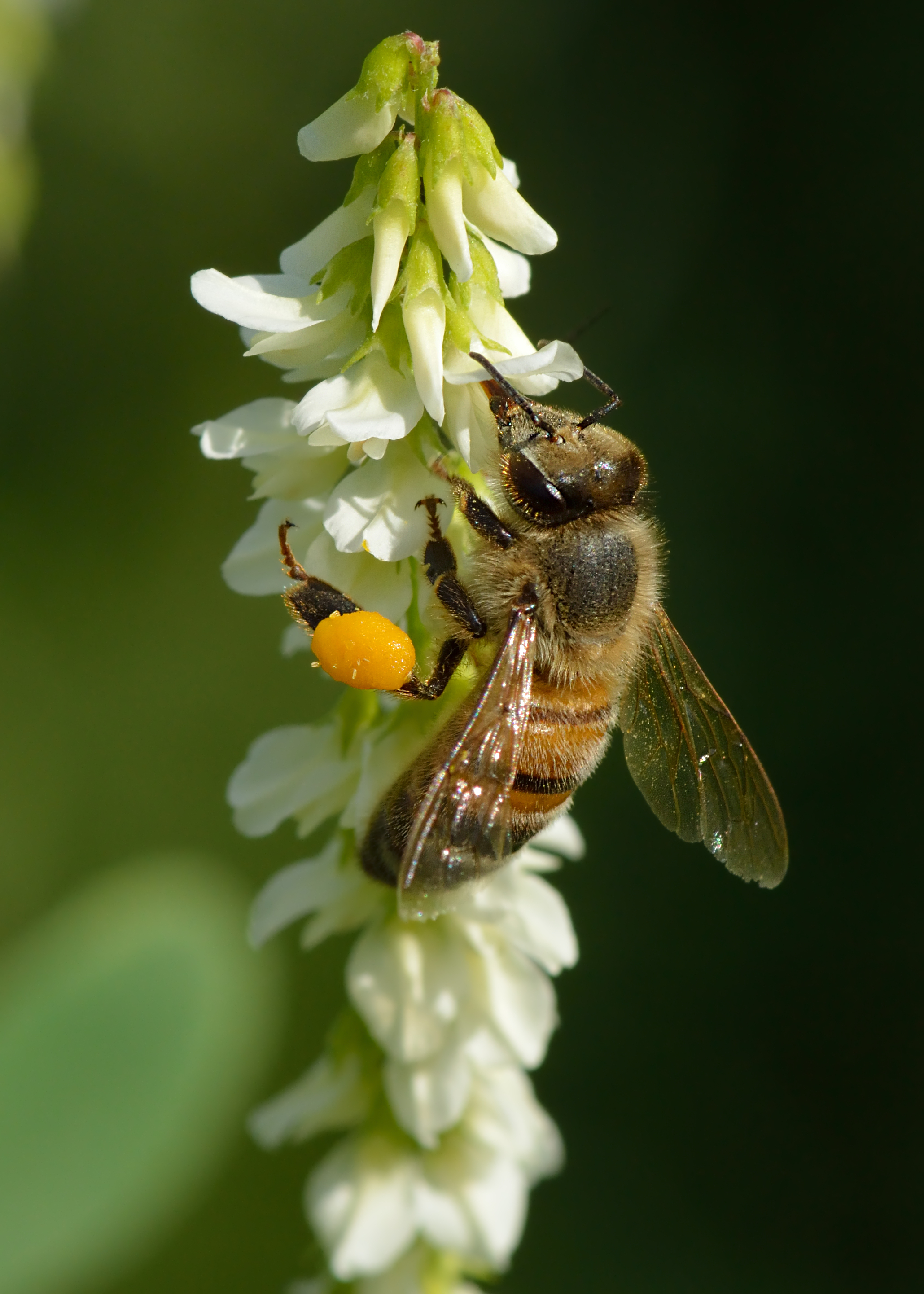
Melilotus albus

Melilotus, known as melilot or sweet clover, is a genus of legumes in the family Fabaceae, native to Europe, Asia, and Africa. The genus is closely related to Trifolium (clovers). Several species are common grassland plants and weeds of cultivated ground, and some species are now found worldwide as naturalised plants.

The scientific and English names both derive from Greek melílōtos from méli (honey), and lōtos (lotus), via Latin melilōtos and Old French mélilot. The alternative name "sweet clover" varies in orthography, also cited as sweet-clover and sweetclover. Other names include "kumoniga", from the Cumans.

== Description ==
The species are annual, biennial, or perennial herbaceous plants, growing to 50–150 cm (20–59 in) tall, with trifoliate leaves similar to clover but narrower, the leaflets only about half as wide as long, and with a serrated margin; each leaf also has two small basal stipules. The flowers are similar to clover flowers, but produced in open racemes 2–5 cm (0.8–2.0 in) or more long, rather than the dense ovoid heads of Trifolium species; they are mostly white or yellow. The seeds are produced singly or in pairs in small pods 1.5–5 mm long.

== Species ==
The genus Melilotus currently has 23 accepted species and two natural hybrids:

- Melilotus albus Medik. (white melilot, white sweet clover)
- Melilotus altissimus Thuill. (tall melilot, tall yellow sweet clover)
- Melilotus arenarius Grecescu
- Melilotus bicolor Boiss. & Balansa
- Melilotus dentatus (Waldst. & Kit.) Desf. (small-flowered melilot)
- Melilotus elegans Salzm. ex Ser. (elegant melilot)
- Melilotus gorkemii Yıld.
- Melilotus hirsutus Lipsky (hairy melilot)
- Melilotus indicus (L.) All. (small melilot, annual yellow sweet clover, Indian sweet clover)
- Melilotus infestus Guss. (round-fruited melilot)
- Melilotus italicus (L.) Lam. (Italian melilot)
- Melilotus macrocarpus Coss. & Durieu
- Melilotus neapolitanus Ten. (Neapolitan melilot; syn. M. spicatus (Sm.) Breistr.)
- Melilotus officinalis (L.) Pall. (ribbed melilot, yellow sweet clover)
- Melilotus polonicus (L.) Desr. (Polish melilot)
- Melilotus segetalis (Brot.) Ser. (corn melilot)
- Melilotus serratifolius Täckh. & Boulos
- Melilotus siculus (Turra) Steud. (southern melilot, messina)
- Melilotus speciosus Durieu
- Melilotus suaveolens Ledeb. (common yellow melilot)
- Melilotus sulcatus Desf. (furrowed melilot, Mediterranean melilot)
- Melilotus tauricus (M.Bieb.) Ser. (Crimean melilot)
- Melilotus wolgicus Poir. (Russian melilot, Volga sweet clover)

Hybrids

- Melilotus × haussknechtianus O.E.Schulz (M. altissimus × M. officinalis)
- Melilotus × schoenheitianus Hausskn. (M. albus × M. officinalis)

== Others ==
Blue melilot (Trigonella caerulea; more often known as blue fenugreek) is not a member of the genus, despite the English name.

== Uses ==
Melilotus species are eaten by the larvae of some Lepidoptera species, such as those of the genus Coleophora, including C. frischella and C. trifolii.

The plants have a sweet smell, which is due to the presence of coumarin in the tissues. Coumarin, though responsible for the sweet smell of hay and newly mowed grass, has a bitter taste, and, as such, possibly acts as a means for the plant to discourage consumption by animals. Some mould fungi (including Penicillium, Aspergillus, Fusarium, and Mucor) can convert coumarin into dicoumarol, a toxic anticoagulant. Consequently, dicoumarol may be found in decaying Melilotus, and was the cause of the so-called "sweet-clover disease", identified in cattle in the 1920s. A few cultivars have been developed with low coumarin content and are safer for forage and silage.

Some species are used as a green manure, grown for a while and then ploughed into the soil to increase the soil nitrogen and organic matter content. It is especially valuable in heavy soils because of its deep rooting. However, it may fail if the soil is too acidic. Unscarified seed is best sown in spring when the ground is not too dry; scarified seed is better sown in late autumn or even in the snow, so it will germinate before competing weeds the following spring.

Melilotus siculus is notable for its high combined tolerance to salinity and waterlogging. As of 2019, the cultivar 'Neptune' has the highest tolerance and persistence under salinity among all pasture legumes, according to the Australian Department of Primary Industries and Regional Development. The salt-tolerant symbiont Ensifer medicae SRDI554 is recommended.
