= Agromyza parvicornis =

Scientific classification
- Kingdom: Animalia
- Phylum: Arthropoda
- Class: Insecta
- Order: Diptera
- Family: Agromyzidae
- Genus: Agromyza
- Species: A. parvicornis

Binomial name
- Agromyza parvicornis (Loew, 1869)

Species of fly

Agromyza parvicornis, the corn blotch leafminer, is a species of leaf miner flies in the family Agromyzidae.

== Host plants ==
Agromyza parvicornis prefers corn but occasionally feeds off of other species of grass
