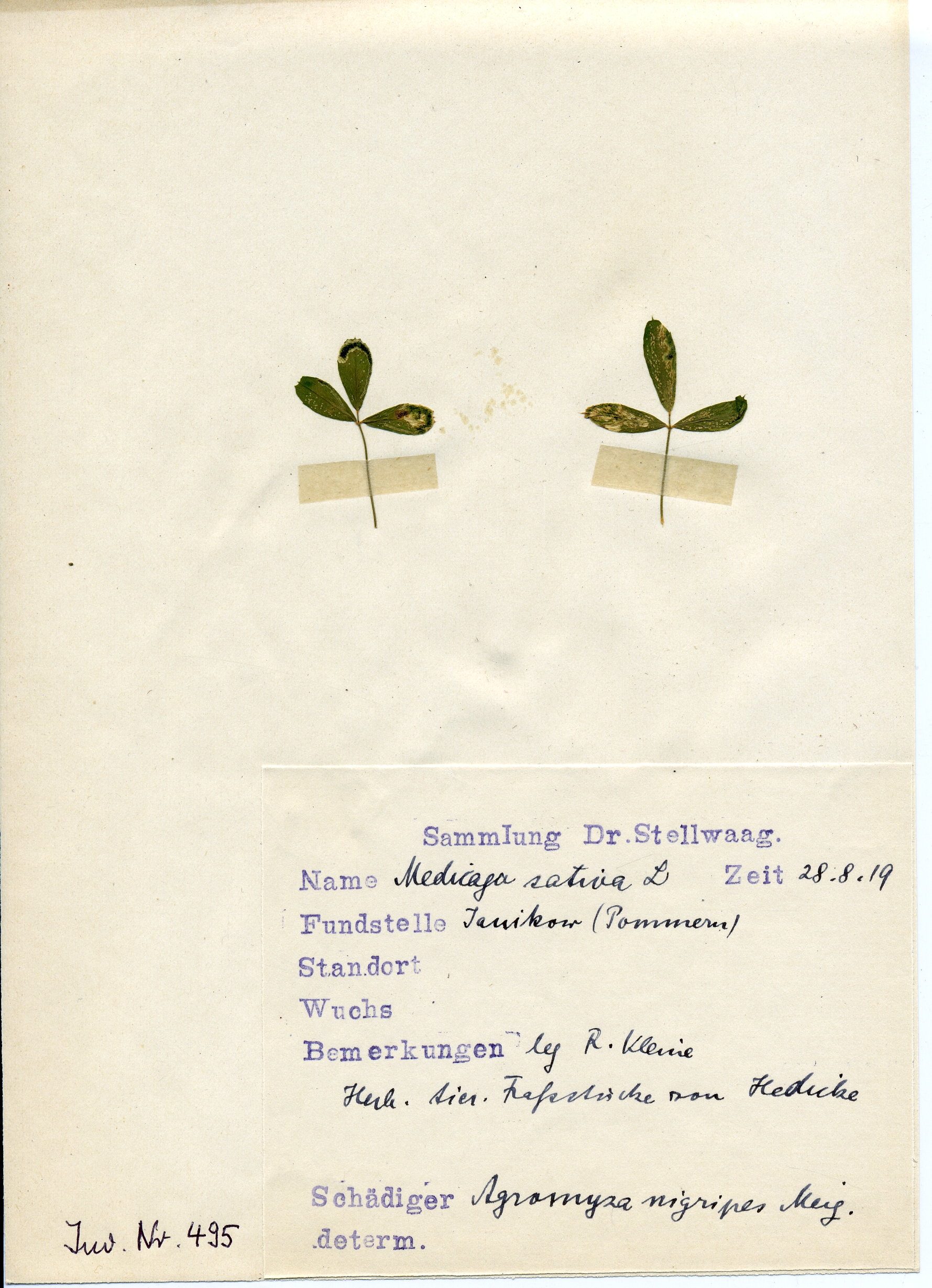
- Agromyza nigripes leafmines on Medicago sativa

Scientific classification
- Kingdom: Animalia
- Phylum: Arthropoda
- Class: Insecta
- Order: Diptera
- Family: Agromyzidae
- Genus: Agromyza
- Species: A. nigripes

Binomial name
- Agromyza nigripes Meigen, 1830

= Agromyza nigripes =

Species of fly

Agromyza nigripes is a species of fly in the family Agromyzidae. It is found in the Palearctic. The body is black. The thorax and abdomen are shiny. There are 1 + 4 dorsocentral bristles and 7 rows of acrostical bristles. The wing veins are brown, yellow at the base. Long. : 2–3,5 mm. The larva makes serpentine mines in Medicago sativa leaves.
