= Agromyza isolata =

Scientific classification
- Domain: Eukaryota
- Kingdom: Animalia
- Phylum: Arthropoda
- Class: Insecta
- Order: Diptera
- Family: Agromyzidae
- Genus: Agromyza
- Species: A. isolata

Binomial name
- Agromyza isolata Malloch, 1913

Synonyms
- Agromyza populoides Spencer, 1969

Species of fly

Agromyza isolata is a species of leaf miner flies in the family Agromyzidae.
