= Agromyza albitarsis =

Scientific classification
- Domain: Eukaryota
- Kingdom: Animalia
- Phylum: Arthropoda
- Class: Insecta
- Order: Diptera
- Family: Agromyzidae
- Genus: Agromyza
- Species: A. albitarsis

Binomial name
- Agromyza albitarsis Meigen, 1830

Species of fly

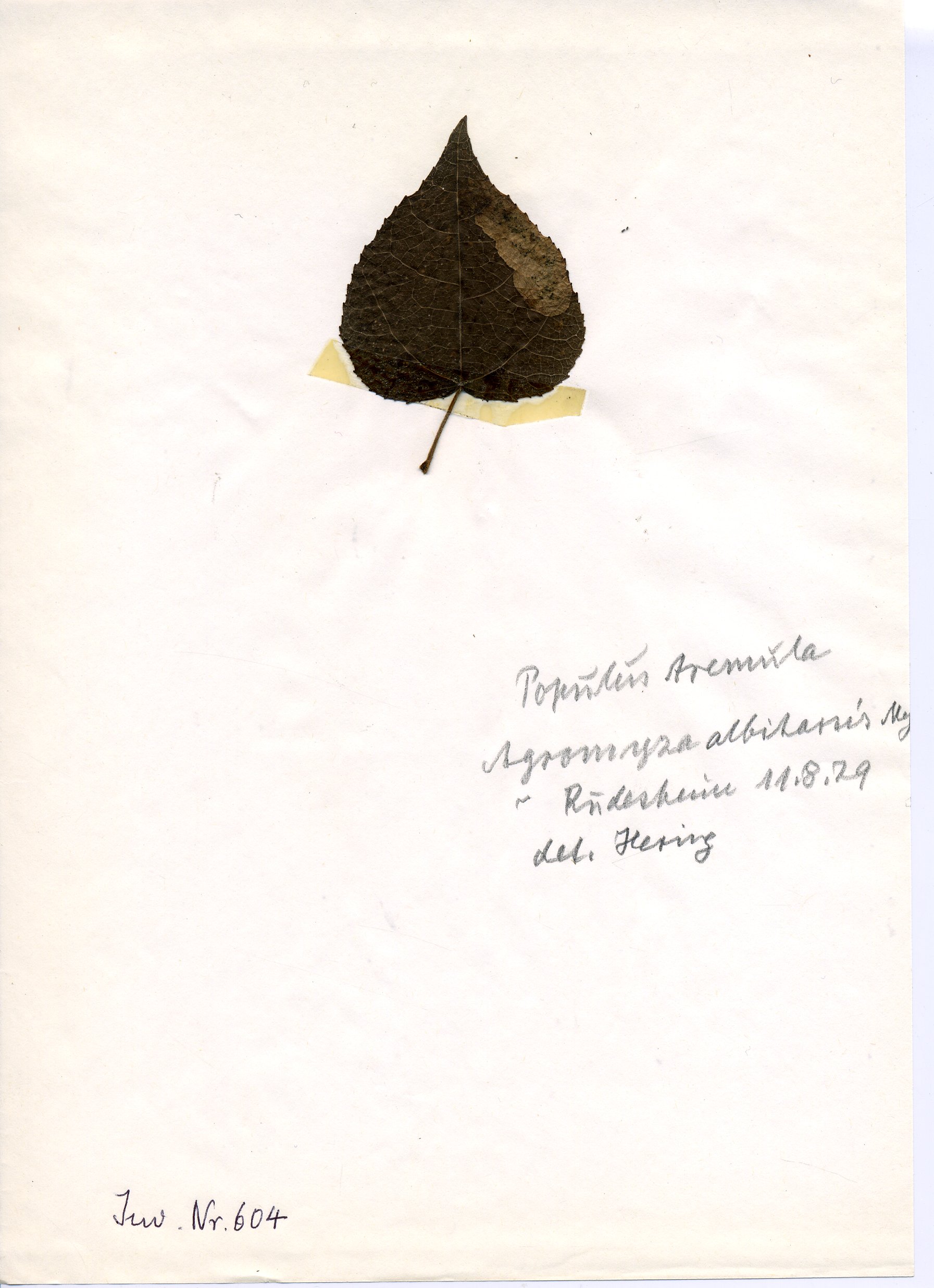

Agromyza albitarsis is a species of leaf miner fly in the family Agromyzidae.
