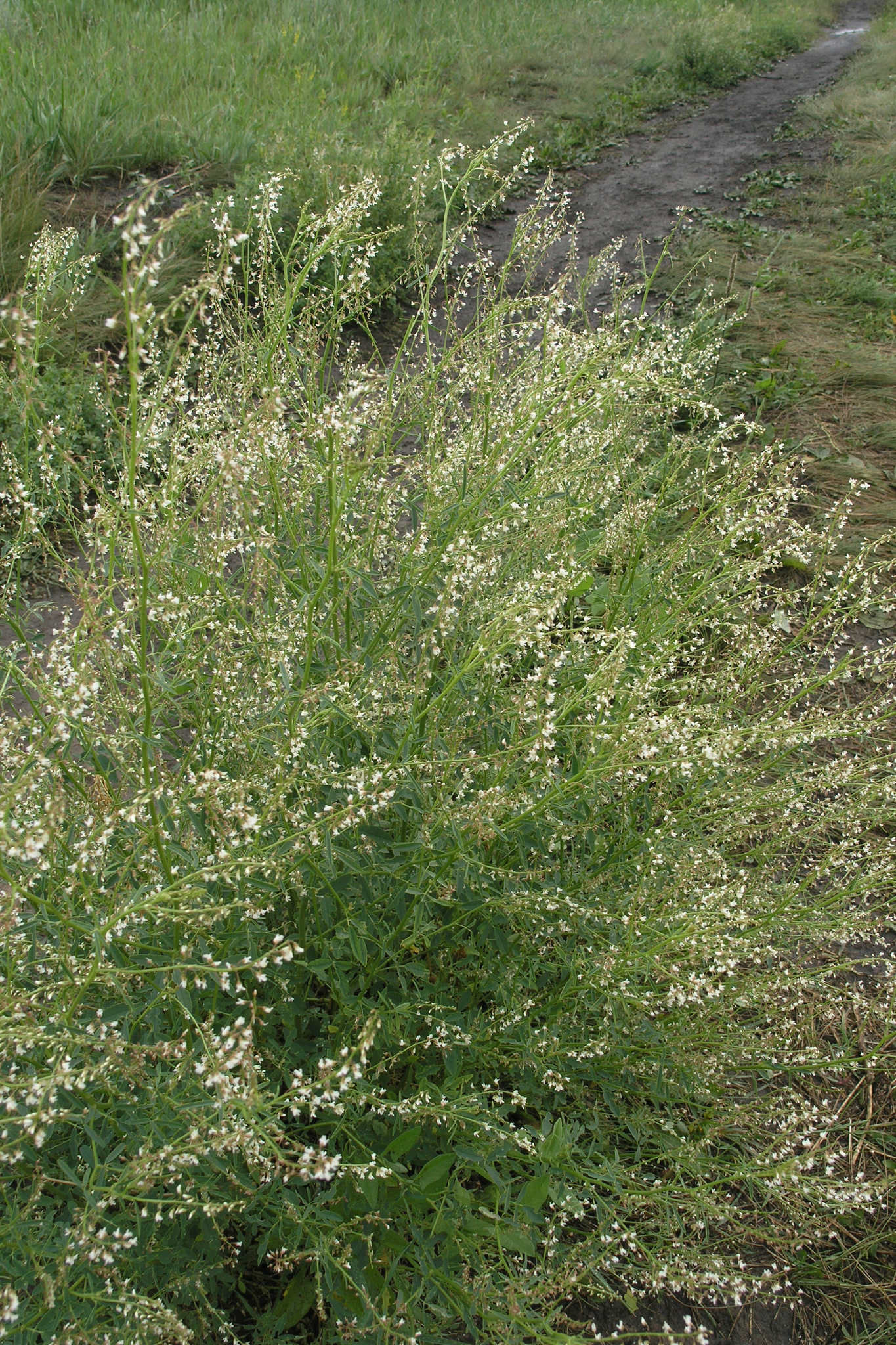
- Melilotus wolgicus

Scientific classification
- Kingdom: Plantae
- Clade: Embryophytes
- Clade: Tracheophytes
- Clade: Spermatophytes
- Clade: Angiosperms
- Clade: Eudicots
- Clade: Rosids
- Order: Fabales
- Family: Fabaceae
- Subfamily: Faboideae
- Genus: Melilotus
- Species: M. wolgicus

Binomial name
- Melilotus wolgicus Poir.

= Melilotus wolgicus =

Species of flowering plant

Melilotus wolgicus, the Volga sweet-clover or Russian melilot, is native to Russia and Kazakhstan, where it is common in the lower Volga and Don valleys. The species is also naturalized in Manitoba and Saskatchewan, where the climate is similar to that of its native range. The plant has been discussed as a potential forage crop, as it is tolerant to cold and to drought, and reportedly more productive than M. albus.

Melilotus wolgicus is a biennial herb with a large taproot. Stems can reach a height of 150 cm (59 in), frequently branching above ground. Leaves are trifoliate with ovate to lanceolate leaflets. Flowers are up to 3.5 mm (0.14 in) long, white with pink veins.
