= Agromyza aristata =

Scientific classification
- Kingdom: Animalia
- Phylum: Arthropoda
- Class: Insecta
- Order: Diptera
- Family: Agromyzidae
- Genus: Agromyza
- Species: A. aristata

Binomial name
- Agromyza aristata Malloch, 1915

Synonyms
- Agromyza ulmi Frost, 1924

Species of fly

Agromyza aristata, the elm agromyzid leafminer, is a species of leaf miner fly in the family Agromyzidae. It is widespread throughout eastern North America, creating leaf mines in Ulmus americana.
