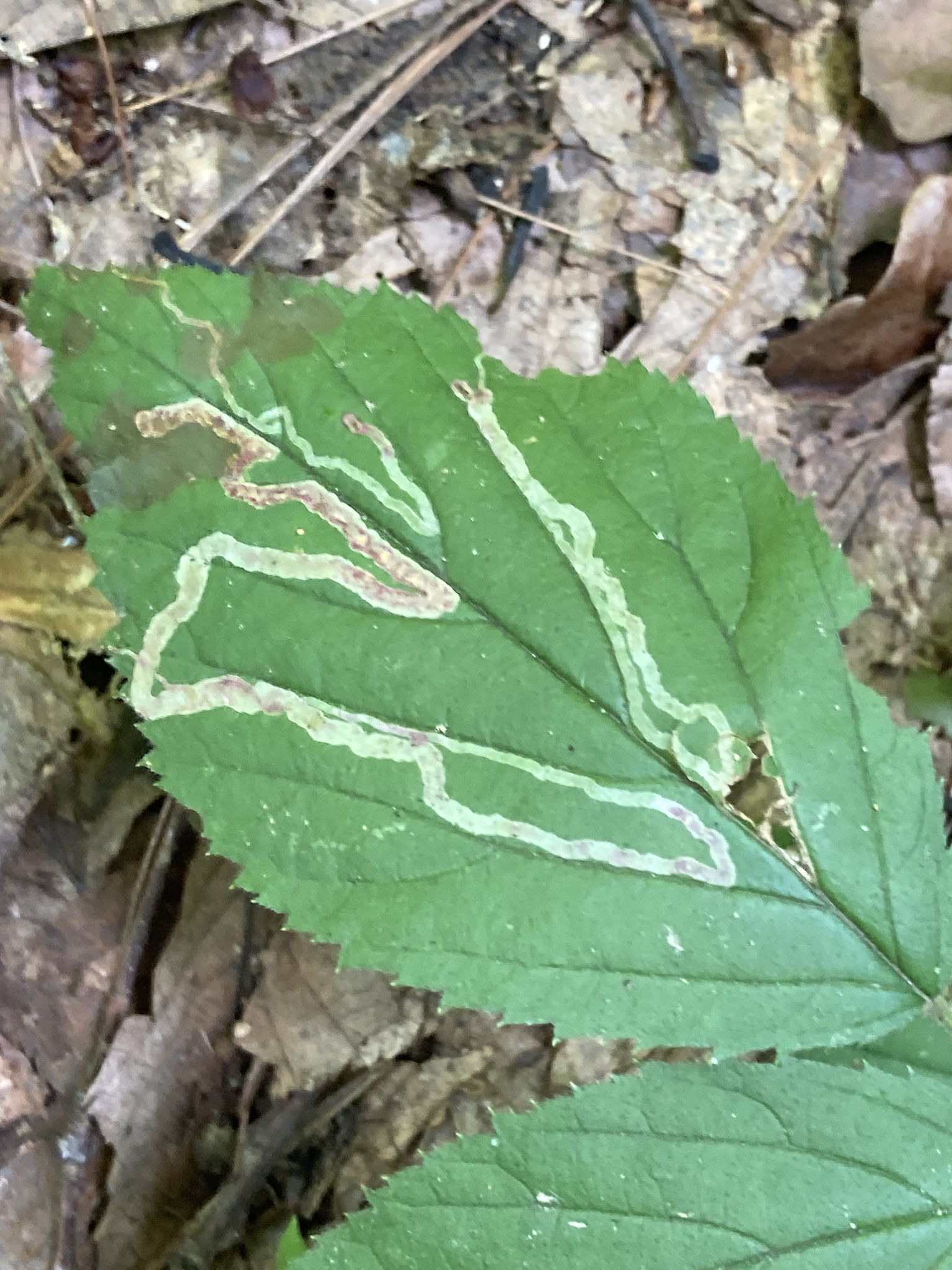
- Tracks from Agromyza vockerothi, Pennsylvania

Scientific classification
- Kingdom: Animalia
- Phylum: Arthropoda
- Clade: Pancrustacea
- Class: Insecta
- Order: Diptera
- Family: Agromyzidae
- Subfamily: Agromyzinae
- Genus: Agromyza
- Species: A. vockerothi

Binomial name
- Agromyza vockerothi (Meigen, 1822)

= Agromyza vockerothi =

Species of fly

Agromyza vockerothi is a species of leaf miner fly in the family Agromyzidae, found in North America. The larvae of this species feed on brambles (Rubus).
