= Agromyza pudica =

Scientific classification
- Domain: Eukaryota
- Kingdom: Animalia
- Phylum: Arthropoda
- Class: Insecta
- Order: Diptera
- Family: Agromyzidae
- Genus: Agromyza
- Species: A. pudica

Binomial name
- Agromyza pudica (G. B. Sowerby I, 1828)

Species of fly

Agromyza pudica is a species of leaf miner flies in the family Agromyzidae.
