= Agromyza sulfuriceps =

Scientific classification
- Domain: Eukaryota
- Kingdom: Animalia
- Phylum: Arthropoda
- Class: Insecta
- Order: Diptera
- Family: Agromyzidae
- Genus: Agromyza
- Species: A. sulfuriceps

Binomial name
- Agromyza sulfuriceps Loew, 1872

Species of fly

Agromyza sulfuriceps is a species of leaf miner fly in the family Agromyzidae. It mines leaves from Potentilla plants.
