= Agromyza pseudoreptans =

Scientific classification
- Domain: Eukaryota
- Kingdom: Animalia
- Phylum: Arthropoda
- Class: Insecta
- Order: Diptera
- Family: Agromyzidae
- Genus: Agromyza
- Species: A. pseudoreptans

Binomial name
- Agromyza pseudoreptans Nowakowski, 1967

Synonyms
- Agromyza urticae Nowakowski, 1964

Species of insect

Agromyza pseudoreptans is a species of leaf miner flies in the family Agromyzidae. It has been known to feed on Urtica dioica and Urtica pilulifera both of which are nettles.
