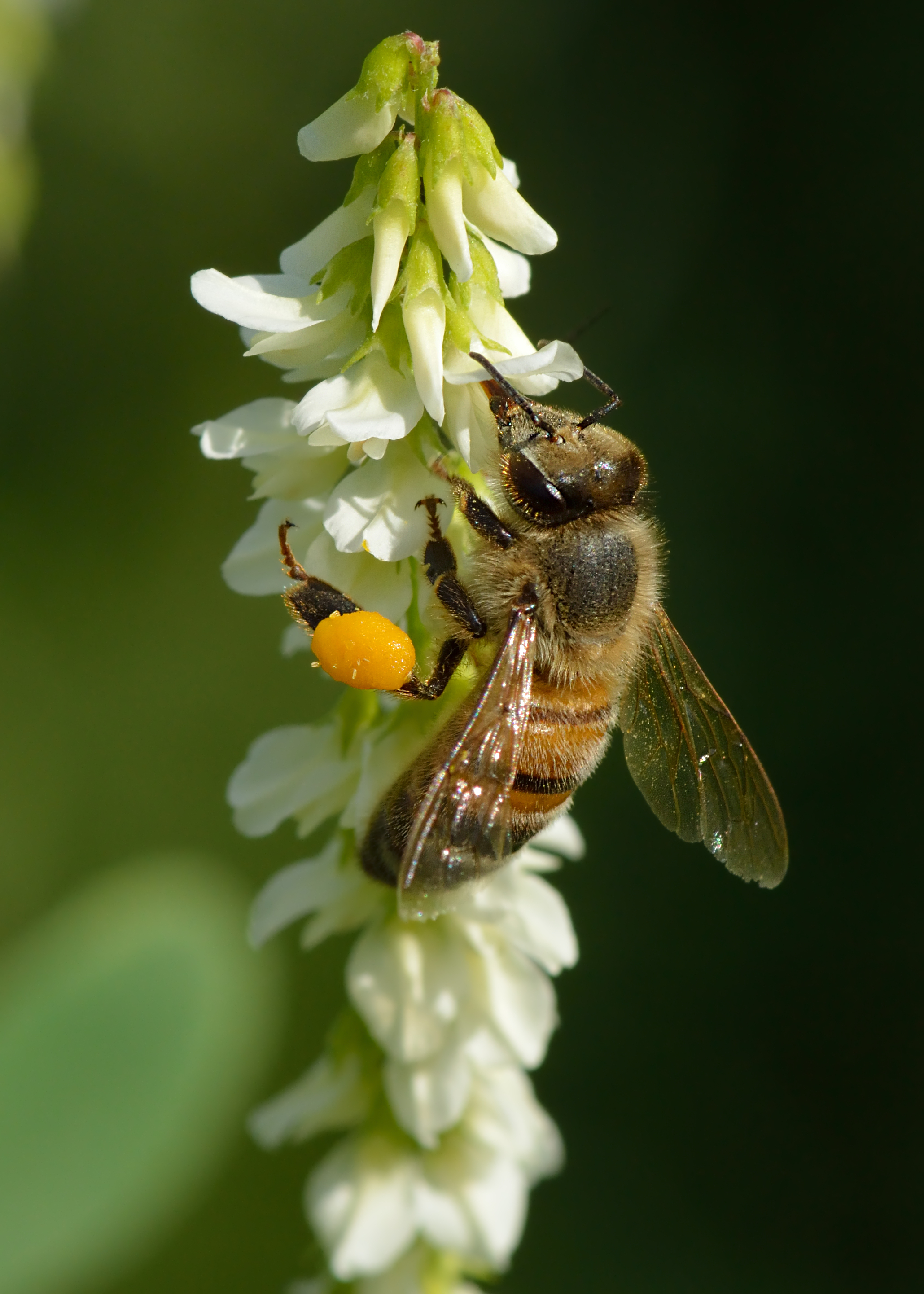

Scientific classification
- Kingdom: Plantae
- Clade: Tracheophytes
- Clade: Angiosperms
- Clade: Eudicots
- Clade: Rosids
- Order: Fabales
- Family: Fabaceae
- Subfamily: Faboideae
- Genus: Melilotus
- Species: M. albus

Binomial name
- Melilotus albus Medik.

Synonyms
- List: Medicago alba E.H.L.Krause (1901); Melilotus albus Desr. (1797); Melilotus albus var. argutus (Rchb.) Rouy (1899); Melilotus albus var. macrocarpus Rupr. (1860); Melilotus albus f. prolifer Dore (1959); Melilotus angulatus Trautv. (1841); Melilotus arboreus Castagne ex Ser. (1825); Melilotus argutus Rchb. (1832); Melilotus giganteus Trautv. (1841); Melilotus kotschyi O.E.Schulz (1901); Melilotus leucanthus W.D.J.Koch ex DC. (1815); Melilotus melanospermus Besser ex Ser. (1825); Melilotus officinalis subsp. albus (Medik.) H.Ohashi & Tateishi (1984); Melilotus officinalis var. albus Mérat (1812); Melilotus officinalis var. vulgaris (Willd.) Wahlenb. (1820); Melilotus rugulosus Trautv. (1841); Melilotus strictus Trautv. (1841); Melilotus tenellus Wallr. (1840); Melilotus urbanii O.E.Schulz (1901); Melilotus vulgaris Willd. (1809); Melilotus vulgaris var. gigantea Gaudin (1829); Melilotus vulgaris var. minor Gaudin (1829); Sertula alba (Medik.) Kuntze (1891); Trifolium vulgare Gueldenst. ex Ledeb. (1843); Trifolium album (Medik.) Loisel. (1807); Trifolium melilotus Georgi (1775); Trigonella alba (Medik.) Coulot & Rabaute (2013)

= Melilotus albus =

Plant species in the bean family

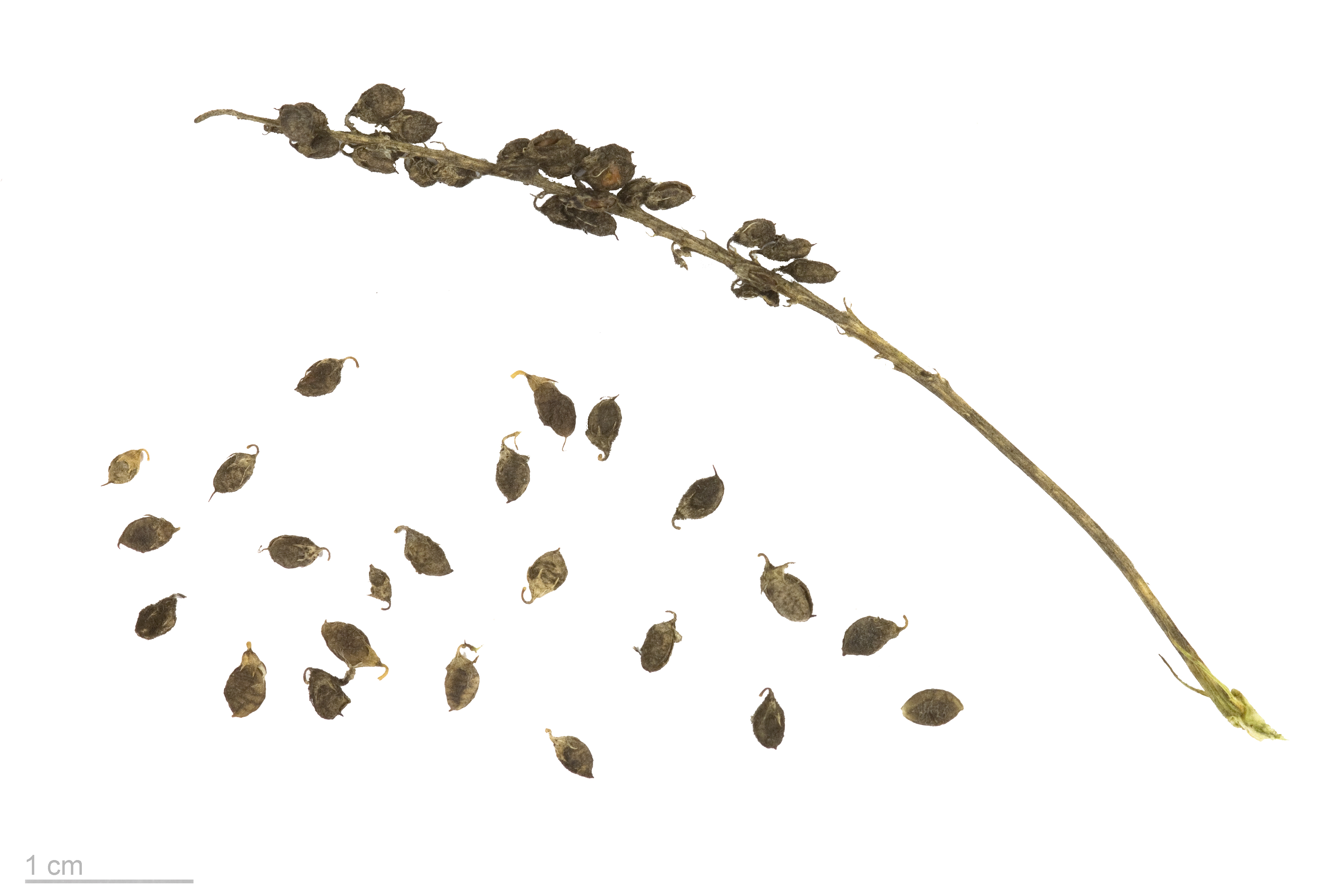
Melilotus albus - MHNT

Melilotus albus, known as honey clover, white melilot (UK), Bokhara clover (Australia), white sweetclover (US), and sweet clover, is a nitrogen-fixing legume in the family Fabaceae. Melilotus albus is considered a valuable honey plant and source of nectar and is often grown for forage. Its characteristic sweet odor, intensified by drying, is derived from coumarin.

Melilotus albus is of Eurasian origin but can now be found throughout the subtropical to temperate zones, especially in North America, and is common in sand dune, prairie, bunchgrass, meadow, and riparian habitats. This species is listed as an "exotic pest" in Tennessee, "ecologically invasive" in Wisconsin, and a "weed" in Kentucky and Quebec.

== Description ==
Melilotus albus is an annual or biennial legume that can reach 2.5 m (8 ft 2 in) in height. The light green stems are round or slightly terete (furrowed on all sides), glabrous (smooth), and often branched. The 1/2 - 2 inch long alternate leaves are trifoliate and sparsely distributed along the stem and alternate in arrangement. The upper stems terminate in narrow racemes of white flowers about 2-6 inches long that have a tendency to hang downward from the central stalk of the raceme. Each flower is about 1/3 inch (8.5 mm) long, consisting of 5 white petals and a light green calyx with 5 teeth. Flowers are small, floppy, tubular at the base and become broader toward the outer edges and wing and keel petals are about equal in length. The ovoid seedpods are black to dark grey, smooth or slightly reticulated and about 0.3 inches long (3-4mm). Each pod usually contains one, but sometimes two, yellow seeds that are ovate to kidney-shaped. Plants generally flower and die during the second year of growth. The blossoming period occurs from early summer to fall, reaching its peak during mid-summer, and lasts for about 1–2 months for a colony of plants. An extensive root system of deep taproots imparts resistance to summer drought. The roots of M. albus are associated with nitrogen-fixing bacteria.

=== Similarity to other species ===
Like white sweetclover, yellow sweetclover (Melilotus officinalis) is erect, tall, and branching, but is distinguished by yellow rather than white flowers. Though they share most botanical characteristics, yellow sweetclover is typically found in drier habitats and has a tendency to bloom about 2–4 weeks earlier than white sweetclover. Some authorities regard white and yellow sweetclover as the same species, in which case white sweetclover is referred to as Melilotus officinalis alba; however, most consider them to be separate species.

Sweetclover seedlings closely resemble those of alfalfa, but may be distinguished from alfalfa by the absence of pubescence on the underside of the leaves and by their bitter taste.

== Distribution ==
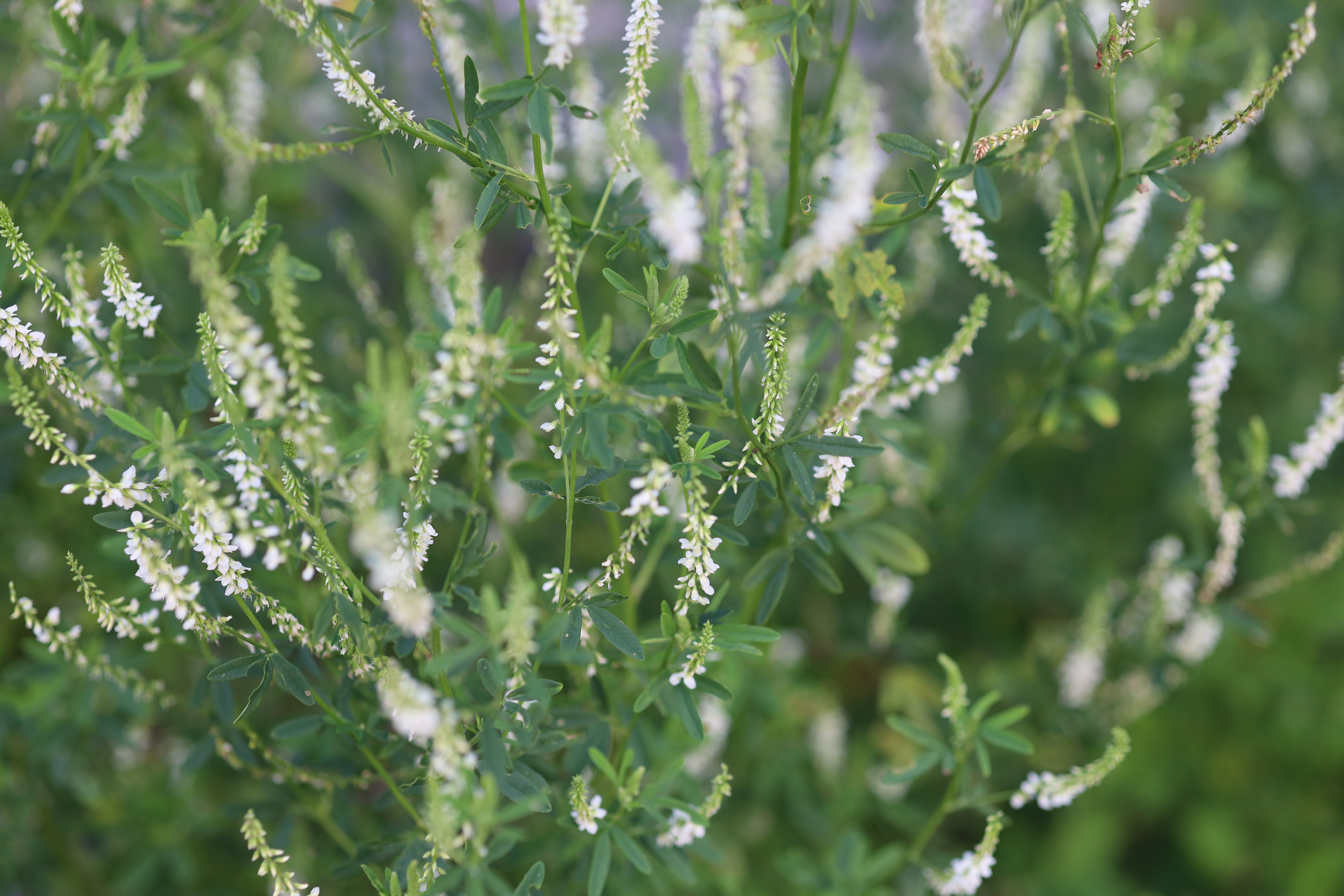
Melilotus alba, Quebec, Canada

White sweetclover is native to much of Asia and southern Europe, from France and Spain to Kazakhstan and Myanmar, and also northeastern Africa.

M. albus has been introduced from Eurasia into South Africa, North and South America, New Zealand, Australia, and Tasmania, as well as many parts of Europe outside its native range. In the US, the species is considered most common in the upper Midwest and Great Plains regions, including Kentucky, Nebraska, Tennessee and Wisconsin.

White sweetclover was brought to North America as early as 1664 as a forage crop. Since then, it has spread from cultivation and thrives in waste places and roadsides. White sweetclover is found in every state in the United States and all but 2 Canadian provinces. It establishes in aspen woodlands and prairies in Canada and the lower 48 states and riparian communities in Alaska. The early spread of M. albus was probably facilitated by beekeepers and agriculturalists, as it can be an important fodder crop and food source for honey bees, and it was brought to Alaska in 1913 as a potential forage and nitrogen (N) fixing crop.

== Habitat ==
While it has a preference for full sun, slightly moist to dry conditions, and calcareous clay-loam or gravelly soil, M. albus is adapted to a wide range of climatic conditions and will grow in practically all soil types, including soils with very low nutrient levels, fine, and course-textured soils (though its size varies considerably with the moisture and fertility of the soil). Sweetclover is adapted to pH levels ranging from 5.0 to 8.0, is salt-tolerant, drought resistant, and winter-hardy. With a range that extends as far north as the Yukon and North West Territories in Canada and Alaska in the United States, M. albus occupies habitats with extreme weather, with rainfall being below 170 mm in some places and almost 4000 mm in others, and with the annual temperature in inland Alaska as low as -3.3 degrees Celsius. M. albus is drought tolerant due to long taproots and only requires adequate moisture for germination. It is then capable of development under extremely dry conditions.

However, M. albus is poorly suited for acid soils, is shade-intolerant, and cannot withstand prolonged flooding, though it is occasionally found on gravelly, open river banks subject to periodic flooding (e.g. in Southern Ontario, Canada).

M. albus can be found in limestone glades, thinly wooded bluffs, prairies, weedy meadows, and also open, disturbed sites, riparian areas, prairies, agronomic fields, pastures, roadsides, ditches, vacant lots, and in waste lands. It often grows where soil moisture is abundant, (e.g. southern California), and early in the succession or recently disturbed or bare sites.

== Biology ==
=== Reproduction and phenology ===
White sweetclover has high seed germination rates. Most germination and development occurs in spring - temperatures of less than 59 degrees F are optimal for germination.

=== Interactions ===
Like other Melilotus spp., M. albus is a nitrogen-fixing plant, forming root nodules with rhizobium bacteria.

== Uses ==
White and yellow sweetclover are considered valuable honey plants, and the foliage and seeds are consumed by wildlife. They are frequently cultivated for livestock forage and as a cover crop.

Melilotus albus has been promoted in Australia for use on dryland soils affected by salinity.

It has been used in herbal medicine. It includes dicoumarol, which is an anticoagulant. It also has a high sugar content.

== As an invasive species ==
White sweetclover is listed as an "exotic pest" in Tennessee, "ecologically invasive" in Wisconsin, and a "weed" in Kentucky and Quebec. It has formed large monospecific stands along rivers in the southeast, southcentral, and interior Alaska, and extensive infestations of white sweetclover have been found on the Stikine, Nenana, and Matanuska Rivers. M. albus is typically more problematic or invasive in northern rather than southern temperate US grasslands, notably in the upper Midwest and Great Plains regions.

It is for its high value as a fodder crop that the risk of deliberate introduction to further countries is high. Seeds of M. albus are also sometimes introduced as impurities in seeds of other crops such as lucerne (Medicago sativa). M. albus is highly likely to be transported internationally both accidentally and deliberately, difficult to identify/detect as a commodity contaminant, and its seeds can persist in the ground for several decades and remain viable. Due to the long viability of seeds, sites must be monitored for many years following control actions.

Seefeldt et al. (2010) observed that moose ingest and spread viable seeds of M. albus and suggested that control of new infestations might be best carried out by following moose trails and monitoring for new patches of the weed.

=== Ecological impacts ===
M. albus has typical weedy attributes such as prolific seed production, persistence and presence along roadsides and railways, and as a result can negatively impact ecosystem services, wildlife habitats, and agriculture. White sweetclover degrades natural grassland communities by overtopping and shading native species. In the US, many studies have shown that M. albus adversely affects native grass and forb recruitment and growth, as well as restricting the establishment and growth of woody plant species. M. albus is a particular threat to prairies because it easily invades open areas and may compete for resources with native species. It is also undesirable on prairie reserves because it is a highly visible exotic when in flower. Additionally, M. albus can reduce native seedling recruitment along glacial river floodplains by directly competing with native plants for light and has the potential to alter sedimentation rates of river ecosystems.

As a nitrogen fixer, M. albus also has the potential to alter the soil nutrient status and modify the environment in nitrogen-poor ecosystems, often making them more attractive to other invasive species. M. albus and M. officinalis have been shown to increase the number of exotic species and decrease native species in montane grasslands.

In addition to fixing nitrogen and thus affecting edaphic conditions, this species offers considerable nectar and pollen resources to floral visitors with an extremely high number of flowers per plant [up to 350,000], particularly in comparison to native boreal insect-pollinated plants that offer less pollen and nectar rewards. As a result, M. albus invasions could also alter plant communities by changing the pollination and reproductive success of native boreal plants.

=== Prevention ===
As with many weedy invasive species that can invade native or improved grasslands, the best method of prevention is to maintain healthy natural communities or pastures/grasslands whose vegetation is disturbed as little as possible. The establishment and maintenance of a uniform, tall and vigorous perennial community can help resist the advance of species like M. albus. In natural areas, it has been shown that establishing a cover of desirable perennial species can eliminate white sweetclover in ± 2 years.

=== Control ===
==== Physical ====
White sweetclover can be managed using mechanical controls such as pulling, cutting, and mowing, but several treatments will be necessary each year until the seedbank is exhausted, and these techniques have given mixed results, sometimes reducing population size and seed production but sometimes dispersing the seed even more widely. Hand pulling can be used for control, but is usually only effective on very small, isolated populations, and is most effective when the ground is soft enough that the root can be removed.

Preliminary results from interior Alaska suggest that cutting second-year (flowering) plants at 1 inch or less in height and pulling first-year plants along with several inches of belowground material would provide effective control. If first-year plants are cut, they will resprout in the same year and could be cut again at a later time.

On some state lands in North Dakota that are not under management for prescribed burns, management procedure has been to mow in late spring/early summer. This generally reduces but does not prevent seed set, as flowering shoots can resprout from axils below the mow height. A power brush cutter can be used to cut the plants close to the ground before flowering.

Little information is available on grazing effects on sweetclover, but observations at the Ordway Prairie in South Dakota suggest that bison tend to avoid it while cattle consume it quite readily. Researchers recommend a May burn followed by grazing in September–October, but a high stocking rate is required.

==== Burning ====
Fire can have very mixed effects on M. albus. Burning can kill some existing plants but often stimulates seed germination when moisture conditions become favorable. The plant is well adapted to survive fire, especially in its second year. In addition, even if the plants themselves are killed by fire, the seeds can survive for long periods in the soil and their germination is stimulated by heat. Furthermore, the new seedlings take advantage of the lack of competition after fire has passed through an area. Though fire has been used successfully in the Midwestern states to stimulate germination, followed by a second burn to eliminate seedlings, attempts to recreate this effect in Alaska have been unsuccessful. While burning can be used to control the species if dormant-season fires used to promote germination of its seed are followed by growing-season fires to kill second-year plants and prevent seed production, this control method will also reduce native forbs.

==== Biological ====
Biological control options have not been investigated because the plant is valued as a forage crop, although White et al. (1999) suggested that the American native sweetclover weevil (Sitona cylindricollis) may provide some control when present in large numbers.

==== Chemical ====
Turkington et al. (1978) reported that Melilotus species are extremely sensitive to damage from widely used herbicides such as 2,4-D, MCPA, MCPB, 2,4-DB and dicamba, although it becomes harder to kill by its second year.

In Alaska, where M. officinalis is proving invasive, Conn and Seefeldt (2009) tested different herbicides in both glasshouse and field for their effectiveness. In the field they found that chlorsulfuron both reduced plant biomass and prevented seed production. Although clopyralid, 2,4-D and triclopyr reduced biomass, results using these chemicals varied from year to year.
