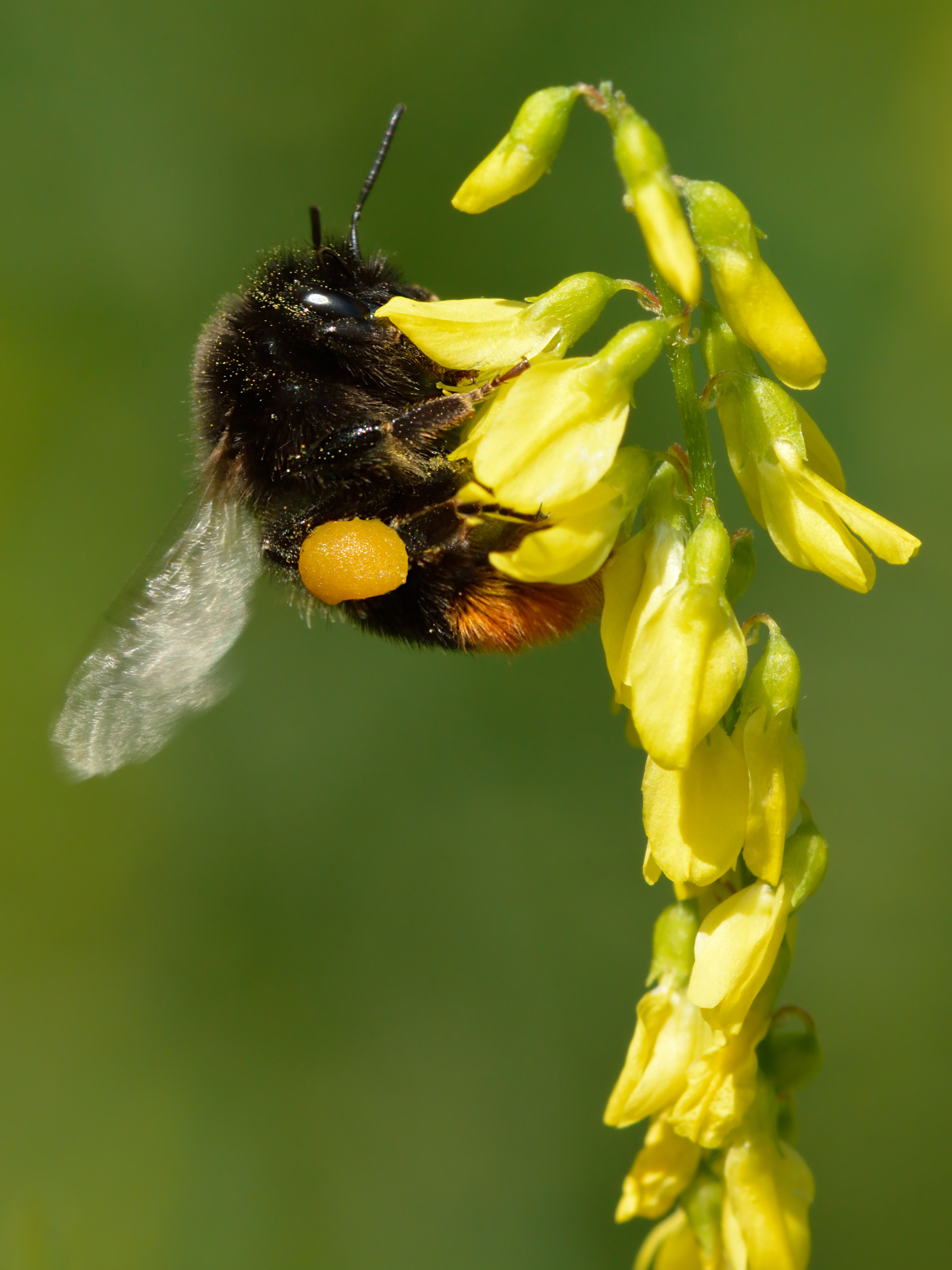

Scientific classification
- Kingdom: Plantae
- Clade: Embryophytes
- Clade: Tracheophytes
- Clade: Angiosperms
- Clade: Eudicots
- Clade: Rosids
- Order: Fabales
- Family: Fabaceae
- Subfamily: Faboideae
- Genus: Melilotus
- Species: M. officinalis

Binomial name
- Melilotus officinalis (L.) Lam.

Synonyms
- List: Brachylobus officinalis (L.) Dulac (1867); Medicago officinalis (L.) E.H.L.Krause (1901); Melilotus armenus Boiss. (1849); Melilotus arvensis Wallr. (1822); Melilotus arvensis var. albus St.-Lag. (1889); Melilotus arvensis var. grandiflorus Lamotte (1876); Melilotus arvensis proles luxurians Rouy (1899); Melilotus arvensis proles maximus (Legrand) Rouy (1899); Melilotus arvensis var. maximus (Legrand) St.-Lag. (1889); Melilotus bungeanus Boiss. (1872); Melilotus citrinus Duval ex Steud. publ.; Melilotus diffusus W.D.J.Koch ex DC. (1815); Melilotus expansus Rchb. (1832); Melilotus flavus Pall. (1776); Melilotus kochianus DC. illeg.; Melilotus longipedicellatus Rosbach (1875); Melilotus lutescens Gilib. oppr.; Melilotus luteus Gueldenst. (1791); Melilotus luxurians Shuttlew. ex Rouy & Foucaud (1899); Melilotus macrorhizus Besser illeg.; Melilotus macrorrhizus var. palustris (Waldst. & Kit.) W.D.J.Koch (1839); Melilotus macrospermus K.Koch ex Boiss. (1872); Melilotus mauritanicus Willd. (1809); Melilotus maximus Legrand (1873); Melilotus melilotus-officinalis (Crantz) Asch. & Graebn. . var.; Melilotus montanus Gaudin (1829); Melilotus nebrodensis Jord. ex Nyman publ.; Melilotus neglectus Ten. (1836); Melilotus officinalis var. expansa Mutel (1834); Melilotus officinalis var. maximus (Legrand) Kojić (1972); Melilotus officinalis f. maximus Legrand (1899); Melilotus pallidus Besser (1823); Melilotus paluster Menyh. . var.; Melilotus palustris (Waldst. & Kit.) Schult. (1814); Melilotus petitpierreanus Willd. (1809); Melilotus petitpierrianus Willd. ex Ces., Pass. & Gibelli . var.; Melilotus rugosus Gilib. oppr.; Melilotus virescens Jord. (1853); Sertula arvensis (Wallr.) Kuntze (1891); Sertula bungeana (Boiss.) Kuntze (1891); Sertula maior Lunell perfl.; Sertula pallida (Besser) Kuntze (1891); Sertula officinalis (L.) Kuntze (1891); Trifolium mauritianum Steud. publ.; Trifolium melilotus-mauritanicum Schousb. (1800); Trifolium melilotus-officinarum Crantz . var.; Trifolium officinale L. (1753); Trifolium palustre Waldst. & Kit. (1812); Trifolium petitpierreanum Hayne (1807); Trifolium vulgare Hayne (1807); Trigonella officinalis (L.) Coulot & Rabaute (2013)

= Melilotus officinalis =

Plant species in the bean family

Melilotus officinalis, known as sweet yellow clover, yellow melilot, ribbed melilot and common melilot, is a species of legume native to Eurasia and introduced in North America, Africa, and Australia.

== Description ==
Melilotus officinalis can be an annual or biennial plant, and is 120–180 centimetres (4–6 ft) high at maturity. Leaves alternate on the stem and possess three leaflets. Yellow flowers bloom in spring and summer and produce fruit in pods typically containing one seed. Seeds can be viable for up to 30 years. Plants have large taproots and tend to grow in groups. Plants have a characteristic sweet odor.

== Identification ==
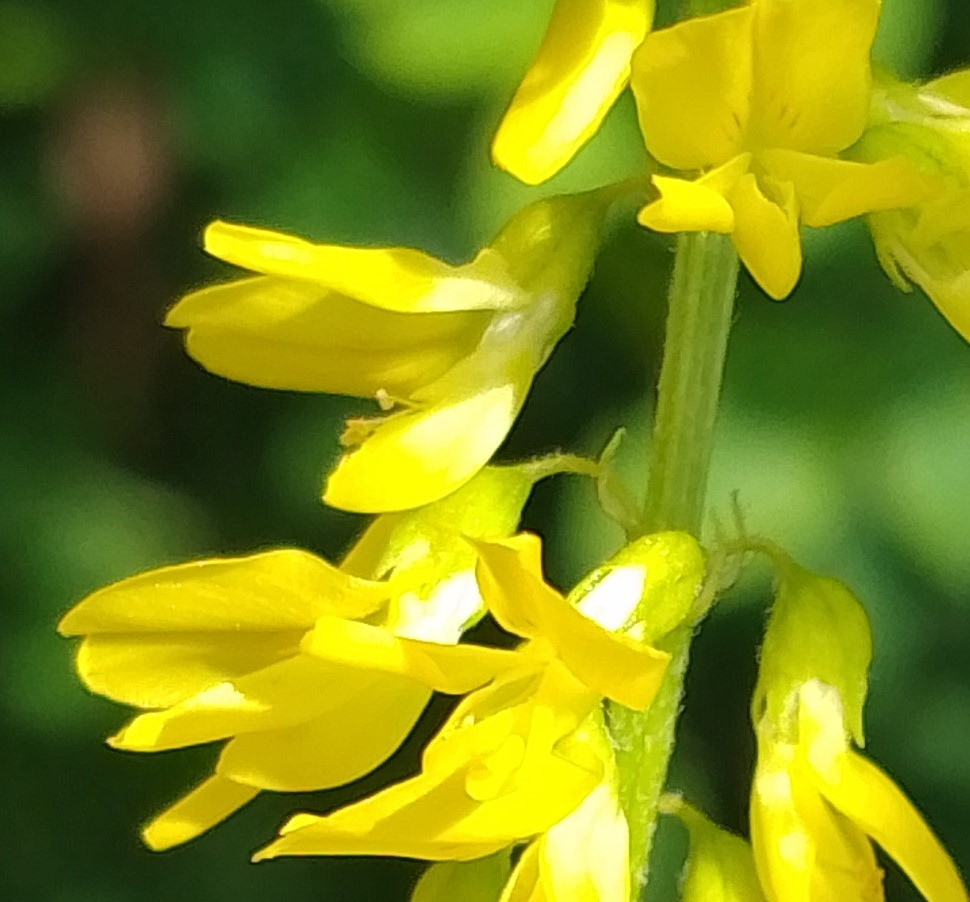
The lower petal is shorter than the lateral ones in ribbed melilot.

Ribbed melilot is very similar in appearance to some other melilots, particularly tall melilot. Its fruits, however, are ribbed and glabrous (not hairy), the upper leaflets are more broadly oval, and the keel, or lower petal, is slightly shorter than the side petals (same length in tall melilot).

== Habitat ==
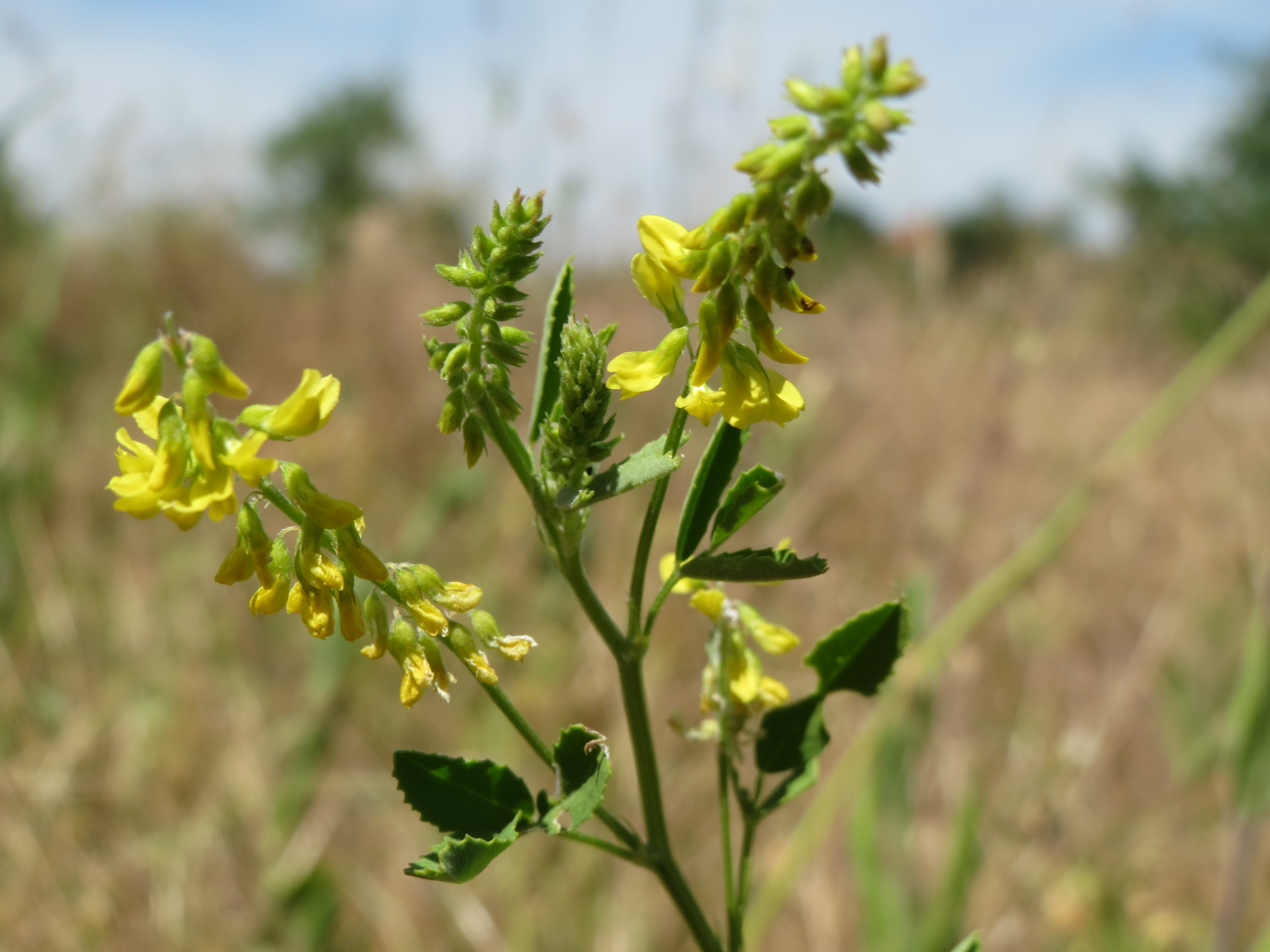

M. officinalis is native to Europe and Asia and has been introduced to North America as a forage crop. It commonly grows in calcareous loamy and clay soils with a pH above 6.5 and can tolerate cold temperatures and drought; it does not tolerate standing water or acidic soils, with a pH of 5.5 as the plant's lowest limit. Common places where it can be found include open disturbed land, prairies, and savannas, and it grows in full or partial sunlight. It is an invasive species in areas where it has been introduced, especially in open grasslands and woodlands where it shades and outcompetes native plant species.

== Toxicology ==
Sweet clover contains coumarin that converts to dicoumarol, which is a powerful anticoagulant toxin, when the plant becomes moldy. This can lead to bleeding diseases (internal hemorrhaging) and death in cattle. Consequently, hay containing the plant must be properly dried and cured, especially in wet environments.

== Uses ==
The seeds are eaten by game birds, including grouse.

Sweetclover can be used as pasture or livestock feed when properly cured. It is most palatable in spring and early summer, but livestock may need time to adjust to the bitter taste of coumarin in the plant. Prior to World War II, before the common use of commercial agricultural fertilizers, the plant was commonly used as a cover crop to increase nitrogen content and improve subsoil water capacity in poor soils. It is the most drought-tolerant of the commercially available legumes. Sweet clover is a major source of nectar for domestic honey bees as hives near sweetclover can yield up to 200 pounds of honey in a year.

Sweetclover has been used as a phytoremediation—phytodegradation plant for treatment of soils contaminated with dioxins.

In the chemical industry, dicoumarol is extracted from the plant to produce rodenticides.

== Management ==
When M. officinalis is invasive, it can be managed by mulching, hand-pulling, mowing, or herbicide applications (e.g., 2,4-D) before flowering. Prescribed burns in late fall or early spring followed by another burn in late spring can reduce the number of plants before seed set.
