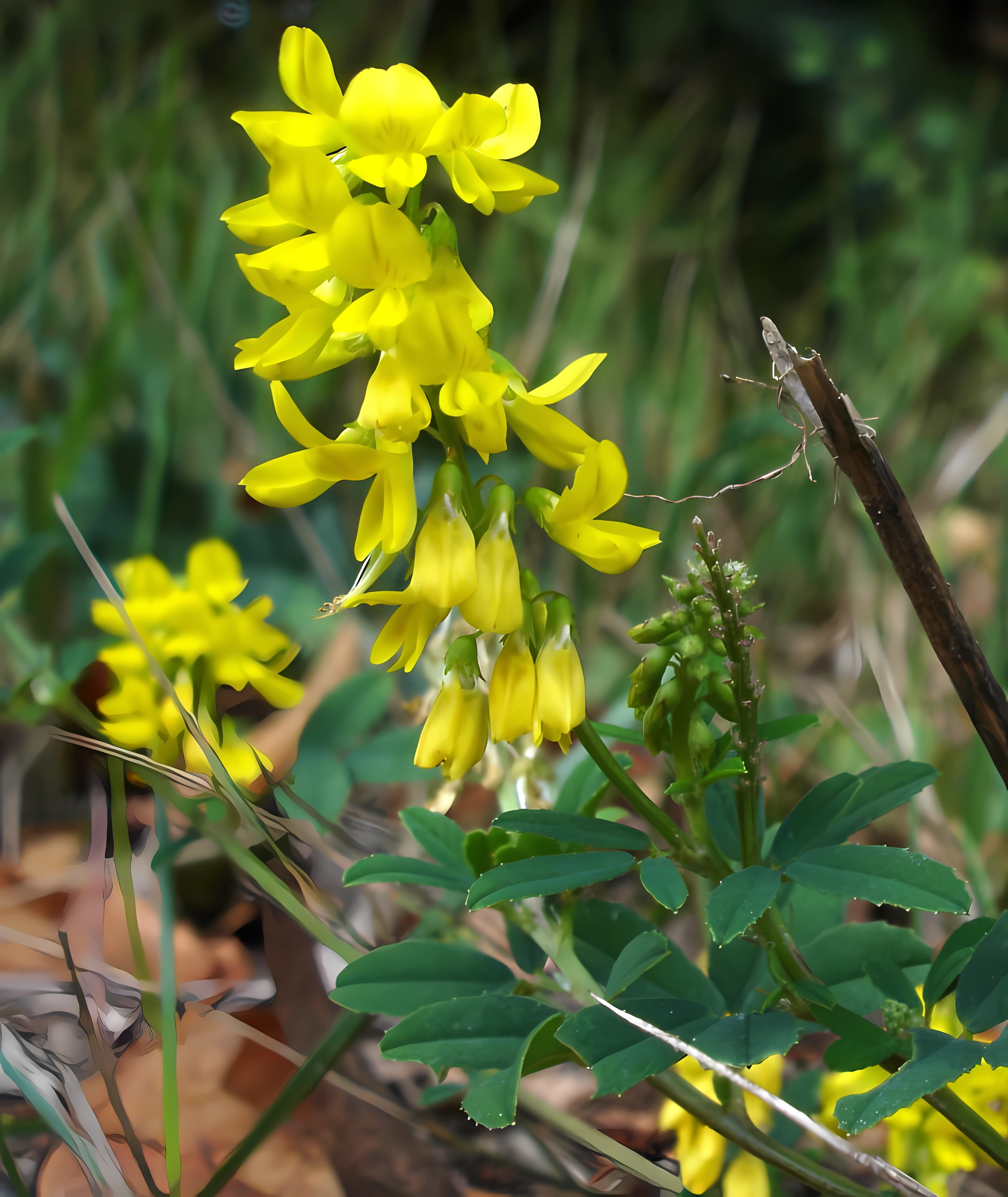

Scientific classification
- Kingdom: Plantae
- Clade: Embryophytes
- Clade: Tracheophytes
- Clade: Spermatophytes
- Clade: Angiosperms
- Clade: Eudicots
- Clade: Rosids
- Order: Fabales
- Family: Fabaceae
- Subfamily: Faboideae
- Genus: Melilotus
- Species: M. altissimus

Binomial name
- Melilotus altissimus Thuill.

= Melilotus altissimus =

Species of flowering plant

Melilotus altissimus, known by the common names tall yellow sweetclover, tall melilot and golden melilot is a plant species of the genus Melilotus.

== Pollinators ==
Melilotus altissimus is a preferred food-plant of Bombus lucorum, B. terrestris and B. lapidarius—all three are short-tongued bumblebees found in the UK.
