= Agromyza =

- Agromyza sp. in copula

Scientific classification
- Domain: Eukaryota
- Kingdom: Animalia
- Phylum: Arthropoda
- Class: Insecta
- Order: Diptera
- Family: Agromyzidae
- Subfamily: Agromyzinae
- Genus: Agromyza; Fallén, 1810

Diversity
- at least 210 species

Genus of flies

Agromyza is a genus of flies belonging to the family Agromyzidae. The adults of these flies can be recognised by the presence of stridulatory files on the first two abdominal tergites in both males and females. Another useful identifying feature is the halteres which are usually white or yellow, although they are darker in a few tropical species.

The larvae of these flies are mostly leaf miners on a wide range of plants, although a few form galls. Some are economic pests.

== See also ==
- List of Agromyza species
