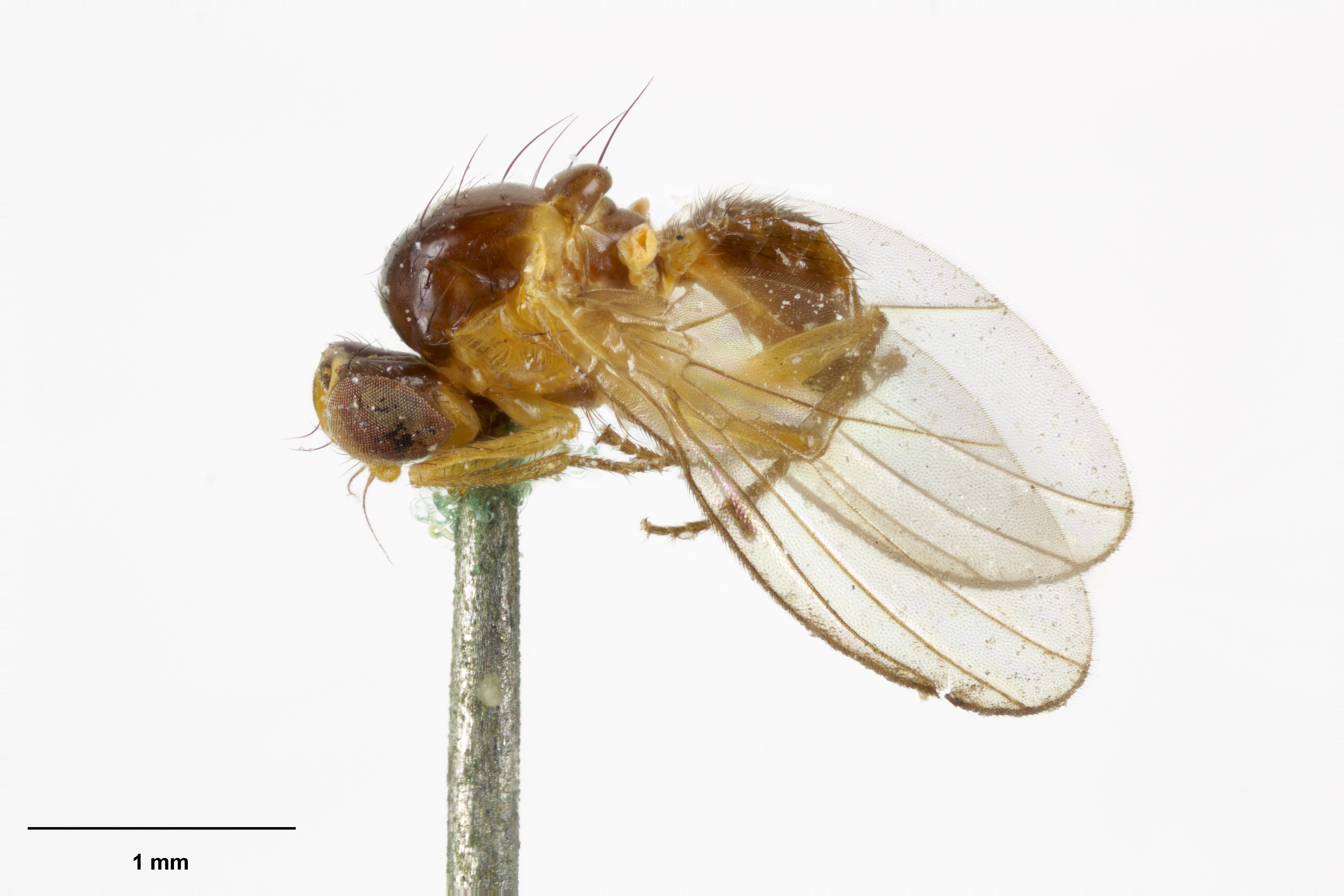
- Phytoliriomyza flavopleura

Scientific classification
- Kingdom: Animalia
- Phylum: Arthropoda
- Class: Insecta
- Order: Diptera
- Family: Agromyzidae
- Subfamily: Phytomyzinae
- Genus: Phytoliriomyza; Hendel, 1931

Synonyms
- Lemurimyza Spencer, 1965; Nesomyza Spencer, 1973; Pteridomyza Nowakowski, 1962; Xyraeomyia Frick, 1952

= Phytoliriomyza =

Genus of flies

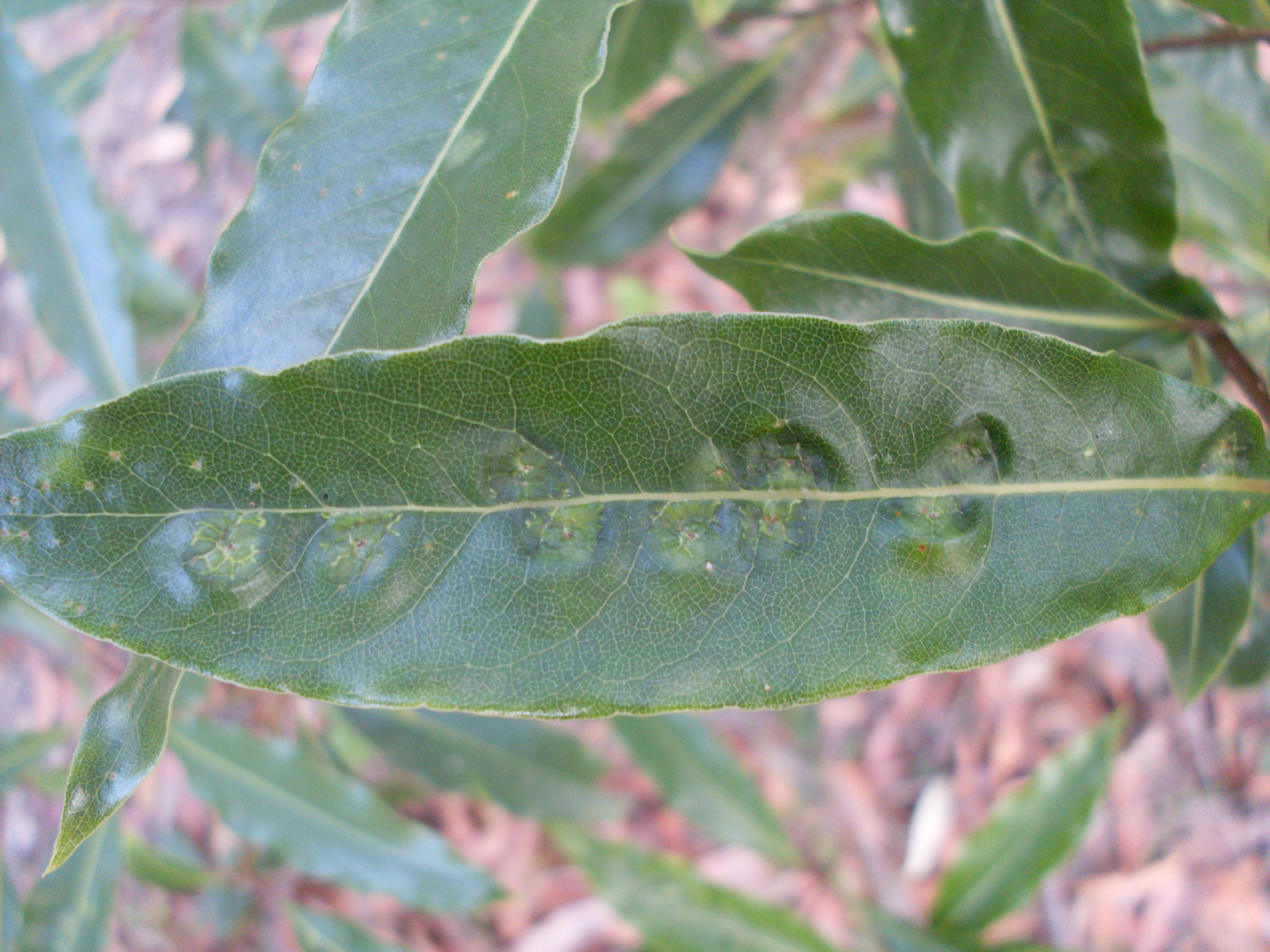
Phytoliriomyza pittosporophylli galls in leaf of Pittosporum undulatum

Phytoliriomyza is a genus of flies in the family Agromyzidae.

== Species ==
- Phytoliriomyza admirabilis (Spencer, 1965)
- Phytoliriomyza alpicola (Strobl, 1898)
- Phytoliriomyza aratriformis Kato, 2022
- Phytoliriomyza arctica (Lundbeck, 1901)
- Phytoliriomyza arcus Kato, 2022
- Phytoliriomyza argentifasciata Kato, 2022
- Phytoliriomyza australensis Spencer, 1963
- Phytoliriomyza australina (Spencer, 1963)
- Phytoliriomyza aysensis Spencer, 1982
- Phytoliriomyza beckerella Spencer, 1981
- Phytoliriomyza berii Singh & Ipe, 1973
- Phytoliriomyza bhutanica (Ipe & Beri, 1971)
- Phytoliriomyza bicolorata Spencer, 1976
- Phytoliriomyza bidensiphoeta Spencer, 1977
- Phytoliriomyza bifasciata Kato, 2022
- Phytoliriomyza bornholmensis Spencer, 1976
- Phytoliriomyza brunofasciata Kato, 2022
- Phytoliriomyza caerulescens Kato, 2022
- Phytoliriomyza calcicola Kato, 2022
- Phytoliriomyza caliginosa Kato, 2022
- Phytoliriomyza calva Zlobin, 1996
- Phytoliriomyza cheliloba Sasakawa, 2013
- Phytoliriomyza chichibuensis Kato, 2022
- Phytoliriomyza clara (Melander, 1913)
- Phytoliriomyza cognata Spencer, 1977
- Phytoliriomyza collessi Spencer, 1977
- Phytoliriomyza colombiana Spencer, 1984
- Phytoliriomyza cometiformis Kato, 2022
- Phytoliriomyza confusa Spencer, 1973
- Phytoliriomyza conjunctimontis (Frick, 1952)
- Phytoliriomyza conocephali Kato, 2022
- Phytoliriomyza conspicua (Sehgal, 1968)
- Phytoliriomyza consulta Spencer, 1986
- Phytoliriomyza convoluta Spencer, 1976
- Phytoliriomyza costaricensis (Spencer, 1973)
- Phytoliriomyza crepusculum Kato, 2022
- Phytoliriomyza curtifistula Sasakawa, 1996
- Phytoliriomyza cyatheae Spencer, 1976
- Phytoliriomyza cyatheana Martinez & Etienne, 2002
- Phytoliriomyza depricei Boucher & Wheeler, 2001
- Phytoliriomyza dimidiatipennis (Garg, 1971)
- Phytoliriomyza diplazii Sasakawa, 1988
- Phytoliriomyza dorsata (Siebke, 1864)
- Phytoliriomyza dumortierae Kato, 2022
- Phytoliriomyza enormis (Spencer, 1963)
- Phytoliriomyza falcata Kato, 2022
- Phytoliriomyza fasciata (Hendel, 1931)
- Phytoliriomyza felti (Malloch, 1914)
- Phytoliriomyza flavens Spencer, 1981
- Phytoliriomyza flavopleura (Watt, 1923)
- Phytoliriomyza flavopleuralis Spencer, 1977
- Phytoliriomyza flavostriata Zlobin, 1997
- Phytoliriomyza floridana Spencer, 1973
- Phytoliriomyza foliocerotis Kato, 2022
- Phytoliriomyza frontalis Spencer, 1982
- Phytoliriomyza fumicosta (Malloch, 1914)
- Phytoliriomyza fusculoides (Spencer, 1973)
- Phytoliriomyza helva Kato, 2022
- Phytoliriomyza hilarella (Zetterstedt, 1848)
- Phytoliriomyza huttensis Spencer, 1976
- Phytoliriomyza igniculus Kato, 2022
- Phytoliriomyza immoderata Spencer, 1963
- Phytoliriomyza imperfecta (Malloch, 1934)
- Phytoliriomyza intermedia Spencer, 1985
- Phytoliriomyza iriomotensis Kato, 2022
- Phytoliriomyza islandica Olafsson, 1988
- Phytoliriomyza izayoi Kato, 2022
- Phytoliriomyza jacarandae Steyskal & Spencer, 1978
- Phytoliriomyza jamaicensis Zlobin, 1996
- Phytoliriomyza jurgensi Spencer, 1983
- Phytoliriomyza lanternaria Kato, 2022
- Phytoliriomyza latifrons Zlobin, 1997
- Phytoliriomyza leechi Spencer, 1981
- Phytoliriomyza lobata (Sasakawa, 1963)
- Phytoliriomyza longifurcae Kato, 2022
- Phytoliriomyza longipennis Spencer, 1964
- Phytoliriomyza luna Kato, 2022
- Phytoliriomyza lurida Spencer, 1963
- Phytoliriomyza luteola Kato, 2022
- Phytoliriomyza lycopersicae (Plá & Cruz, 1981)
- Phytoliriomyza magellani Spencer, 1982
- Phytoliriomyza marchantiae Kato, 2022
- Phytoliriomyza marginalis Sasakawa, 2007
- Phytoliriomyza medellinensis Spencer, 1984
- Phytoliriomyza megacerotis Kato, 2022
- Phytoliriomyza melampyga (Loew, 1869)
- Phytoliriomyza meridana Spencer, 1973
- Phytoliriomyza mesnili (Aguilar, 1945)
- Phytoliriomyza mexicana Spencer, 1977
- Phytoliriomyza mikii (Strobl, 1898)
- Phytoliriomyza minuta Spencer, 1977
- Phytoliriomyza minutissima Spencer, 1981
- Phytoliriomyza mollis Spencer, 1977
- Phytoliriomyza monstruosa Spencer, 1977
- Phytoliriomyza montana Frick, 1953
- Phytoliriomyza mucarensis Spencer, 1982
- Phytoliriomyza nepalensis Spencer, 1977
- Phytoliriomyza nigrescens Spencer, 1982
- Phytoliriomyza nigriantennalis Spencer, 1975
- Phytoliriomyza nigricans Spencer, 1977
- Phytoliriomyza nigrifrons (Hendel, 1920)
- Phytoliriomyza nigroflava Kato, 2022
- Phytoliriomyza nubatama Kato, 2022
- Phytoliriomyza nublensis Spencer, 1982
- Phytoliriomyza oasis (Becker, 1907)
- Phytoliriomyza oreophila Singh & Ipe, 1973
- Phytoliriomyza pacifica (Melander, 1913)
- Phytoliriomyza pallida (Sehgal, 1968)
- Phytoliriomyza pallidicentralis (Malloch, 1927)
- Phytoliriomyza pallidofasciata Kato, 2022
- Phytoliriomyza papei Zlobin, 2005
- Phytoliriomyza pectoralis (Becker, 1908)
- Phytoliriomyza perpusilla (Meigen, 1830)
- Phytoliriomyza perturbata Spencer, 1973
- Phytoliriomyza phaeocerotis Kato, 2022
- Phytoliriomyza picea Spencer, 1963
- Phytoliriomyza pittosporocaulis (Hering, 1962)
- Phytoliriomyza pittosporophylli (Hering, 1962)
- Phytoliriomyza plagiochasmatos Kato, 2022
- Phytoliriomyza polita Spencer, 1977
- Phytoliriomyza praecellens Spencer, 1977
- Phytoliriomyza pteridii Spencer, 1973
- Phytoliriomyza pulchella Spencer, 1986
- Phytoliriomyza queenslandica Spencer, 1977
- Phytoliriomyza rangalensis Spencer, 1975
- Phytoliriomyza rebouliae Kato, 2022
- Phytoliriomyza ricciae Kato, 2022
- Phytoliriomyza rieki Spencer, 1977
- Phytoliriomyza robiniae (Valley, 1982)
- Phytoliriomyza rossi Sasakawa, 1992
- Phytoliriomyza sabanae Spencer, 1984
- Phytoliriomyza scotica Spencer, 1962
- Phytoliriomyza sexfasciata Kato, 2022
- Phytoliriomyza similis Spencer, 1984
- Phytoliriomyza simillima Zlobin, 1997
- Phytoliriomyza simlensis (Ipe & Beri, 1971)
- Phytoliriomyza spectata Spencer, 1977
- Phytoliriomyza striatella Spencer, 1977
- Phytoliriomyza sublima Spencer, 1977
- Phytoliriomyza suetsugui Kato, 2022
- Phytoliriomyza tearohensis Spencer, 1976
- Phytoliriomyza triangulata Boucher & Wheeler, 2001
- Phytoliriomyza tricolor (Malloch, 1927)
- Phytoliriomyza tsukuyomi Kato, 2022
- Phytoliriomyza ugetsu Kato, 2022
- Phytoliriomyza varia (Melander, 1913)
- Phytoliriomyza variana Spencer, 1977
- Phytoliriomyza variegata (Meigen, 1830)
- Phytoliriomyza venustula Spencer, 1976
- Phytoliriomyza viciae (Spencer, 1969)
- Phytoliriomyza volatilis Spencer, 1969
- Phytoliriomyza wiesnerellae Kato, 2022
- Phytoliriomyza ypsilon Sasakawa, 2007
