= Pittosporum undulatum =

Scientific classification
- Kingdom: Plantae
- Clade: Embryophytes
- Clade: Tracheophytes
- Clade: Angiosperms
- Clade: Eudicots
- Clade: Asterids
- Order: Apiales
- Family: Pittosporaceae
- Genus: Pittosporum
- Species: P. undulatum

Binomial name
- Pittosporum undulatum Vent.

Australian tree

Pittosporum undulatum is a fast-growing tree in the family Pittosporaceae. It is sometimes also known as sweet pittosporum, native daphne, Australian cheesewood, Victorian box or mock orange.

Pittosporum undulatum has become invasive in parts of Australia where it is not indigenous. It is also highly invasive in South Africa, the Caribbean, Hawaii, the Azores and southern Brazil.

== Description ==
Pittosporum undulatum grows as a shrub or small tree to 15 m (49 ft) tall. Its evergreen leaves are lance-shaped (lanceolate), with wavy (undulating) margins. It carries conspicuous orange woody fruits about 1 cm in diameter for several months after flowering in spring or early summer.

== Taxonomy ==
French botanist Étienne Pierre Ventenat described Pittosporum undulatum in 1802.

== Distribution and habitat ==
Originally P. undulatum grew in moist areas on the Australian east coast, where its natural range was from south-east Queensland to eastern Victoria, but has increased its range since European settlement.

== Ecology ==
Likely pollinators of its flowers are moths and butterflies, as the flower produces a fragrant perfume at night. The fruit are eaten by currawongs, red-whiskered bulbuls, Indian mynahs and grey-headed flying foxes. Seed is dispersed in bird faeces.

This species is attacked by a range of herbivorous insects. Larvae of pittosporum longicorn (Strongylurus thoracicus) bore into sapwood, pittosporum beetle (Lamprolina aeneipennis) consumes leaves, two fly species form leaf galls (Phytoliriomyza pittosporophylli) and twig galls (P. pittosporocaulis), pittosporum psyllid (Trioza vitreoradiata) forms small lumps on leaves, gall thrips (Teuchothrips spp.) often infest leaves, while pittosporum bug (Pseudapines geminata) and several scale insect species feed on the sap.

== Invasive species ==
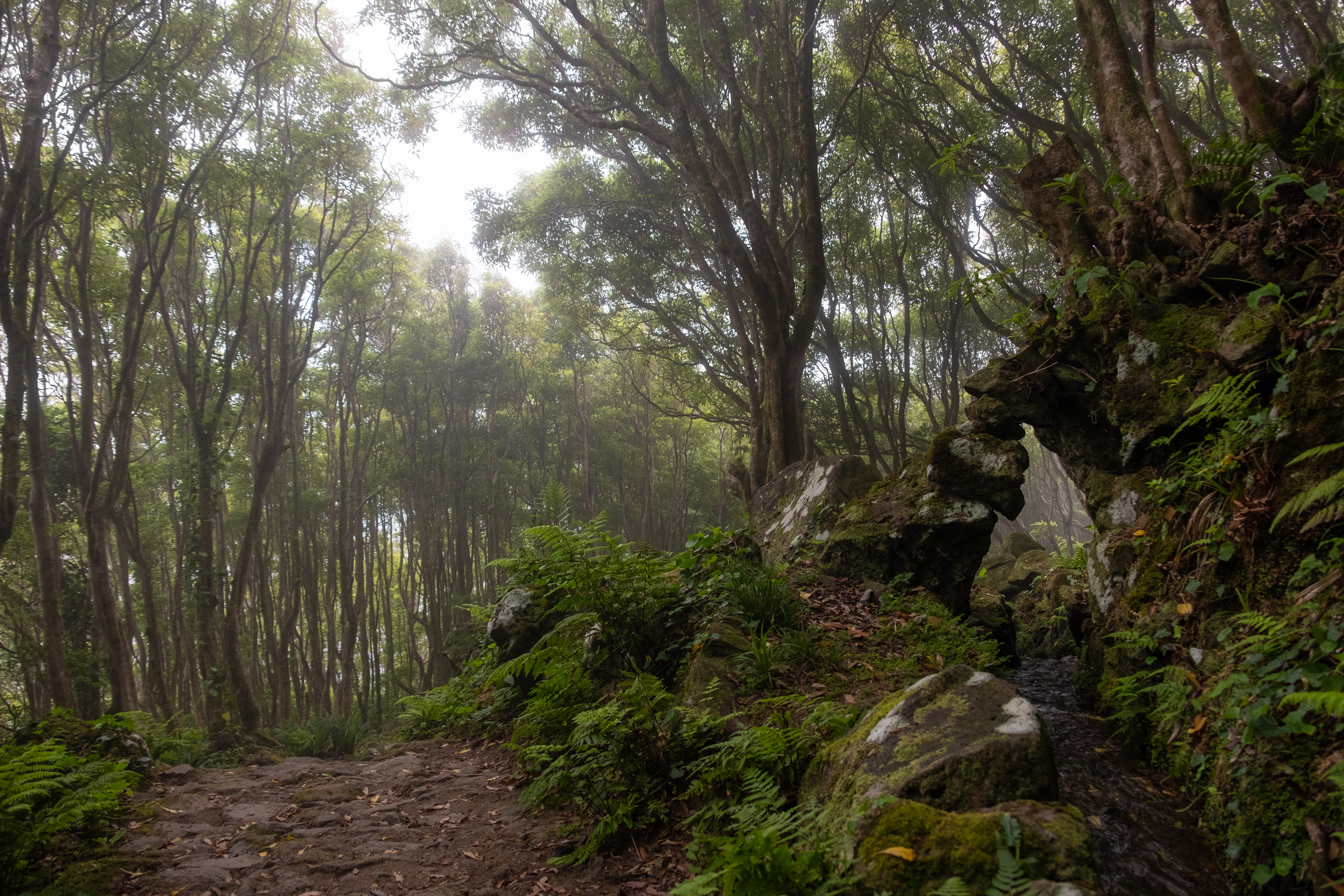
Pittosporum undulatum forests on the Azores

According to the Australasian Virtual Herbarium, the earliest-known record of P. undulatum is from Port Jackson, Sydney, in 1803. However, its status around the Sydney area is contentious. Even though it is native to the region, it has spread to soils and bushland where it wasn't found before European settlement, often out-competing other plants.

Pittosporum undulatum is the most invasive tree species in the Azores, and has spread through most of the mid- to low-altitude forests, out-shading and replacing native trees, such as Myrica faya and Laurus azorica.

It has done especially well in areas where the environment has been altered by humans – for example by habitat fragmentation weakening other natives or due to fertilizer runoff from homes increasing soil nutrients. Unlike most natives, it takes advantage of high nutrient levels and its seeds can germinate without needing fire. That has led to the species sometimes receiving the "invasive" label, although some think that it is merely returning to areas where it grew before people arrived in Australia and began burning the environment far beyond that which previously occurred.

Recommended control measures have included the identification and selective removal of female trees to prevent spread, as well as careful burning, where possible, together with follow-up weeding.

== Gallery ==
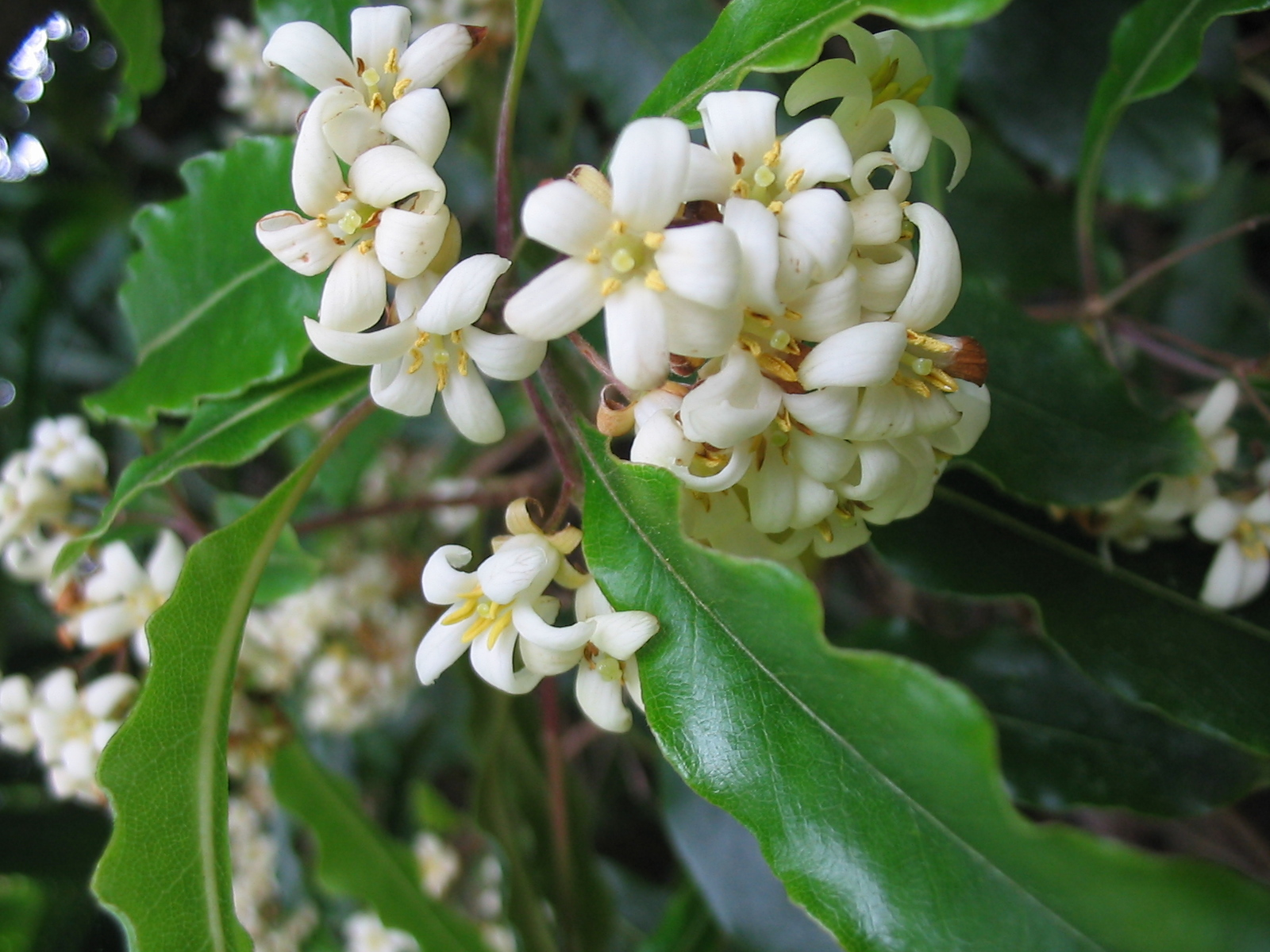
Detail of flowers

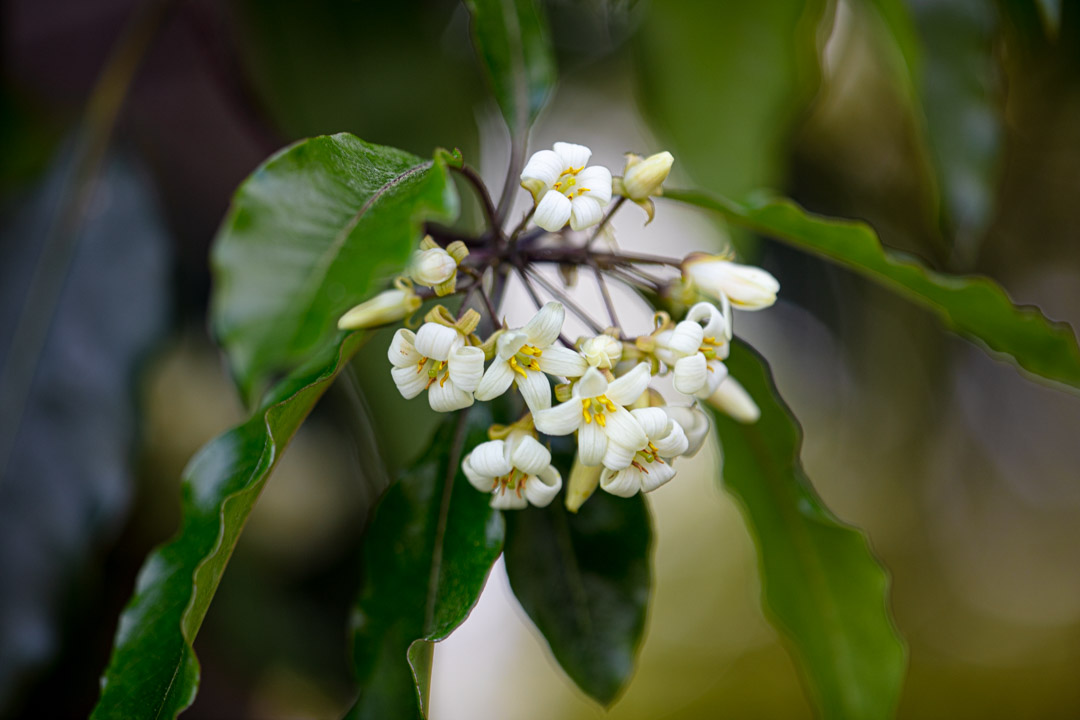
Pittosporum undulatum flower closeup

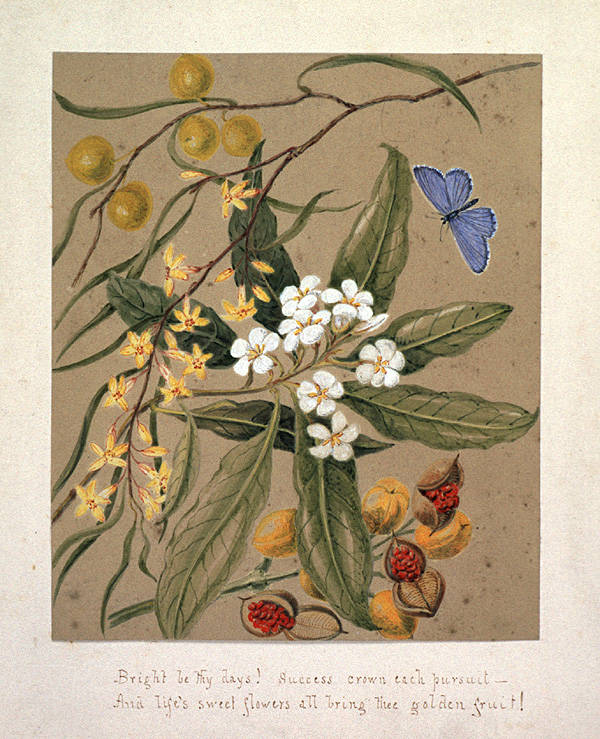
Pittosporum undulatum c. 1860

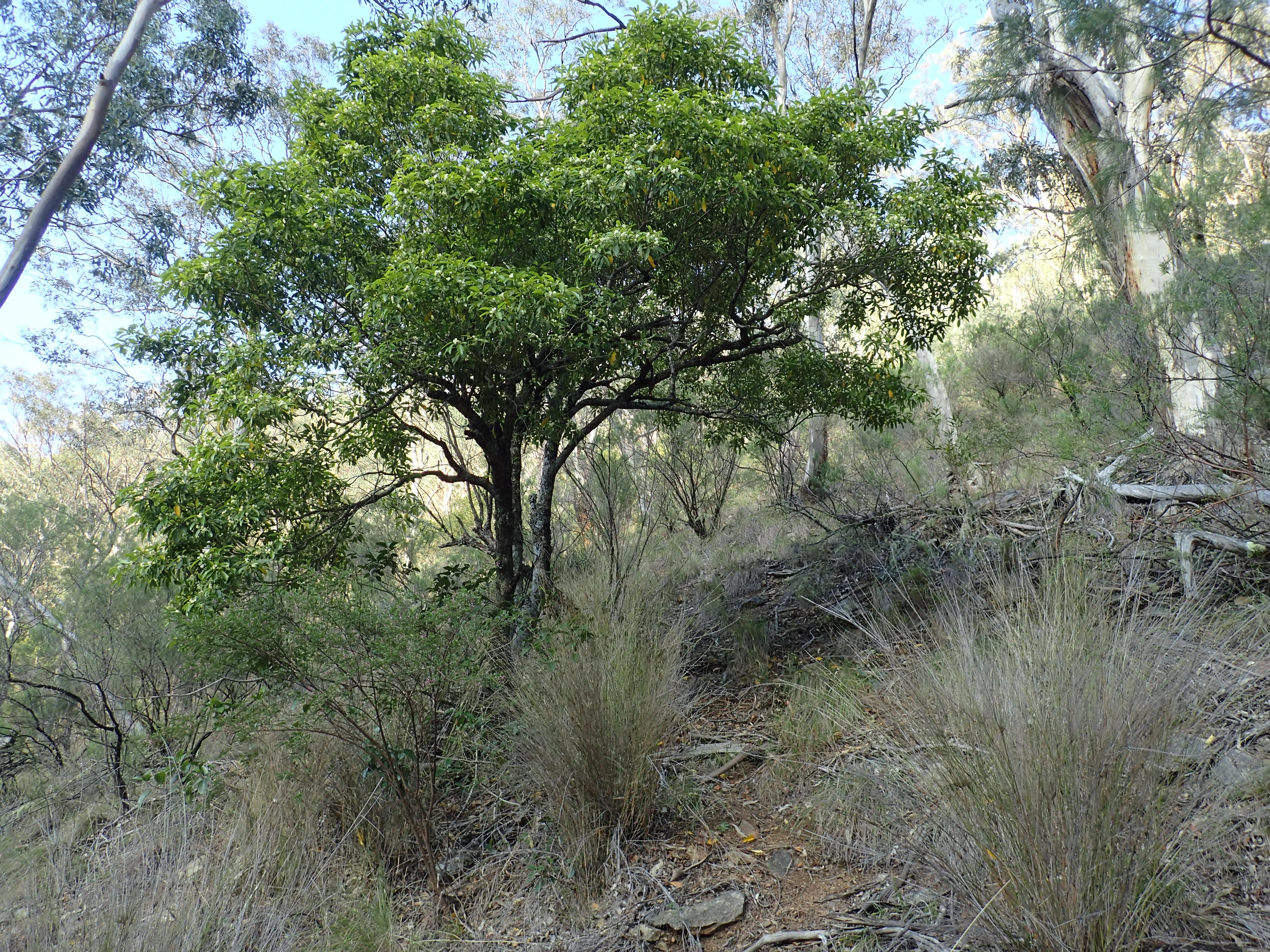
P. undulatum in the Oxley Wild Rivers National Park

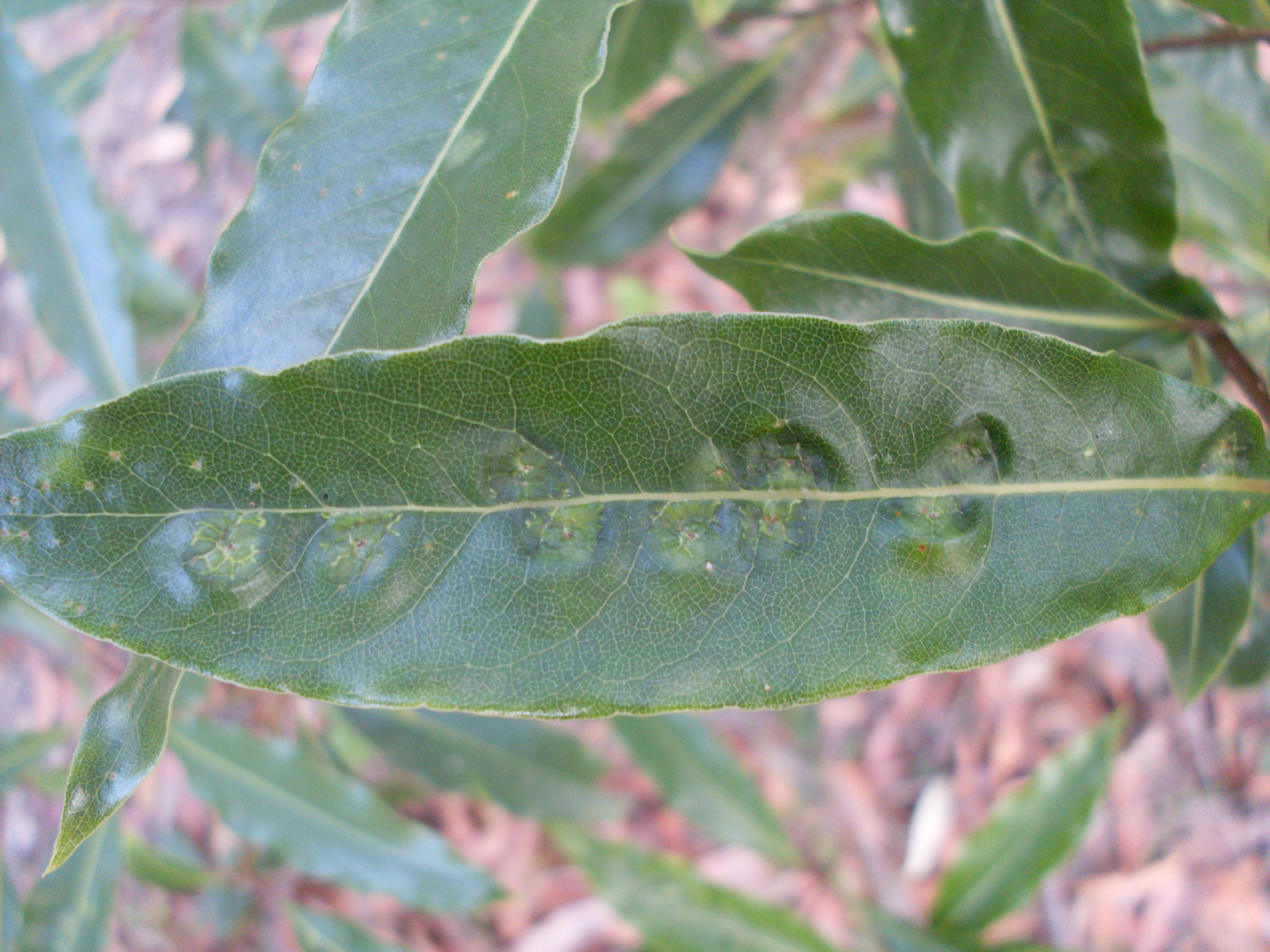
Leaf galls formed by Phytoliriomyza pittosporophylli (Agromyzidae)
