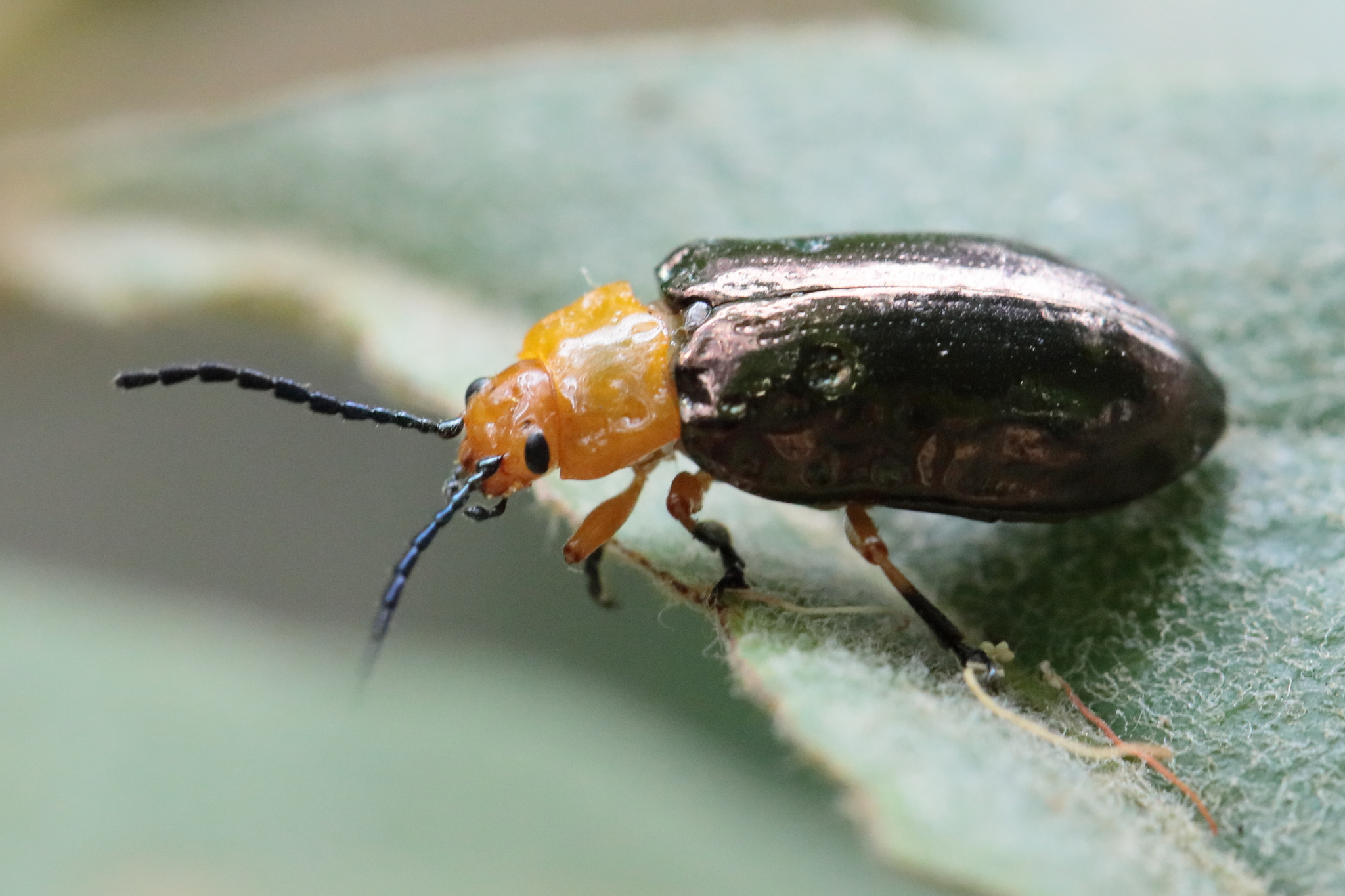
- Lamprolina aeneipennis

Scientific classification
- Domain: Eukaryota
- Kingdom: Animalia
- Phylum: Arthropoda
- Class: Insecta
- Order: Coleoptera
- Suborder: Polyphaga
- Infraorder: Cucujiformia
- Family: Chrysomelidae
- Subfamily: Chrysomelinae
- Genus: Lamprolina; Baly, 1855

Type species
- Phyllocharis aeneipennis Boisduval, 1835

= Lamprolina =

Genus of beetles

Lamprolina is an Australian genus of leaf beetles (Chrysomelidae) found in Victoria, New South Wales, and Queensland.

== Description ==
Adults of this genus are 6-14 mm long (15 mm has also been reported) with relatively narrow and flat bodies. The elytra may be dark blue or dark green, while the head and pronotum may be red, orange or yellow. The prosternum is either anteriorly produced at middle, or the pronotal hypomeron has a groove parallel to pronotal margin. The middle of each side of the pronotum usually has large irregular punctate depressions. An elytral posthumeral depression is usually present. As in other leaf beetle genera, the two sexes can be distinguished by the shape of the last abdominal ventrite: it has a rounded apex in females and a truncate apex in males.

Larvae have a brown head with six black eyes spots on each side. The underside of the body is pale, while the upper side is dark and has spines. Lamprolina is part of a non-glanduliferous group of chrysomelines (also including Johannica, Chalcolampra and Phyllocharis) whose larvae are elongate with well-developed setose sclerites and no lateral glands.

== Diet ==
Lamprolina feed mostly on plants in the family Pittosporaceae: Bursaria, Hymenosporum and Pittosporum. An undescribed species feeds on Tasmannia of family Winteraceae.

== Life cycle ==
These beetles begin their lives as eggs laid on leaves or stems of host plants, which hatch into larvae within one week. Once larvae have finished feeding and growing, they migrate to the base of their host plants to pupate in soil for several months. They emerge as adults which can be seen on host plants, feeding and mating.

== Taxonomy ==
The type species, Lamprolina aeneipennis, was originally assigned to genus Phyllocharis by Jean Baptiste Boisduval. It was moved to the newly erected genus Lamprolina in 1855 by Joseph Sugar Baly, who also described several new species.

The species in this genus are:

- Lamprolina aeneipennis (Boisduval, 1835)
- Lamprolina binotata Lea, 1903
- Lamprolina discoidalis Baly, 1865
- Lamprolina foveilatera Lea, 1916
- Lamprolina grandis Baly, 1855
- Lamprolina hackeri Lea, 1915
- Lamprolina impressicollis Baly, 1875
- Lamprolina jansoni Baly, 1875
- Lamprolina minor Lea, 1929
- Lamprolina perplexa Baly, 1856
- Lamprolina puncticollis Baly, 1855
- Lamprolina simillimus Baly, 1855
- Lamprolina simplicipennis Lea, 1916
