= Phytoliriomyza pittosporocaulis =

Scientific classification
- Kingdom: Animalia
- Phylum: Arthropoda
- Clade: Pancrustacea
- Class: Insecta
- Order: Diptera
- Family: Agromyzidae
- Subfamily: Phytomyzinae
- Genus: Phytoliriomyza
- Species: P. pittosporocaulis

Binomial name
- Phytoliriomyza pittosporocaulis (Hering, 1962)

Synonyms
- Phytobia (Praspedomyza) pittosporocaulis Hering, 1962

Species of fly

Phytoliriomyza pittosporocaulis is an Australian species of fly in the family Agromyzidae.

== Description ==
Phytoliriomyza pittosporocaulis and the similar-looking P. pittosporophylli both have a pale frons, a lunule approximately in the form of a semicircle, reclinate orbital setulae, a black scutellum, pale halteres, and dorso-central bristles in a 3+1 arrangement. It can be distinguished from P. pittosporophylli by the third antennal segment being largely yellow.

The larva has 4-6 bulbs in each posterior spiracle; this differs from the 8-10 bulbs of P. pittosporophylli.

Full descriptions of the adult and larva (and the gall produced by the latter) were given by Hering.

== Ecology ==
Larvae of this species form twig galls on sweet pittosporum (Pittosporum undulatum). These galls are up to 5.7 mm in diameter and semi-ovoid or hemispherical in shape. Sometimes multiple galls occur together with overlapping edges.
