= Phytoliriomyza clara =

Scientific classification
- Kingdom: Animalia
- Phylum: Arthropoda
- Class: Insecta
- Order: Diptera
- Family: Agromyzidae
- Subfamily: Phytomyzinae
- Genus: Phytoliriomyza
- Species: P. clara

Binomial name
- Phytoliriomyza clara (Melander, 1913)

Synonyms
- Agromyza citreifrons Malloch, 1913; Agromyza clara Melander, 1913

Species of fly

Phytoliriomyza clara is a species of fly in the family Agromyzidae. It feeds on bracken.

== Distribution ==
Canada, United States.
