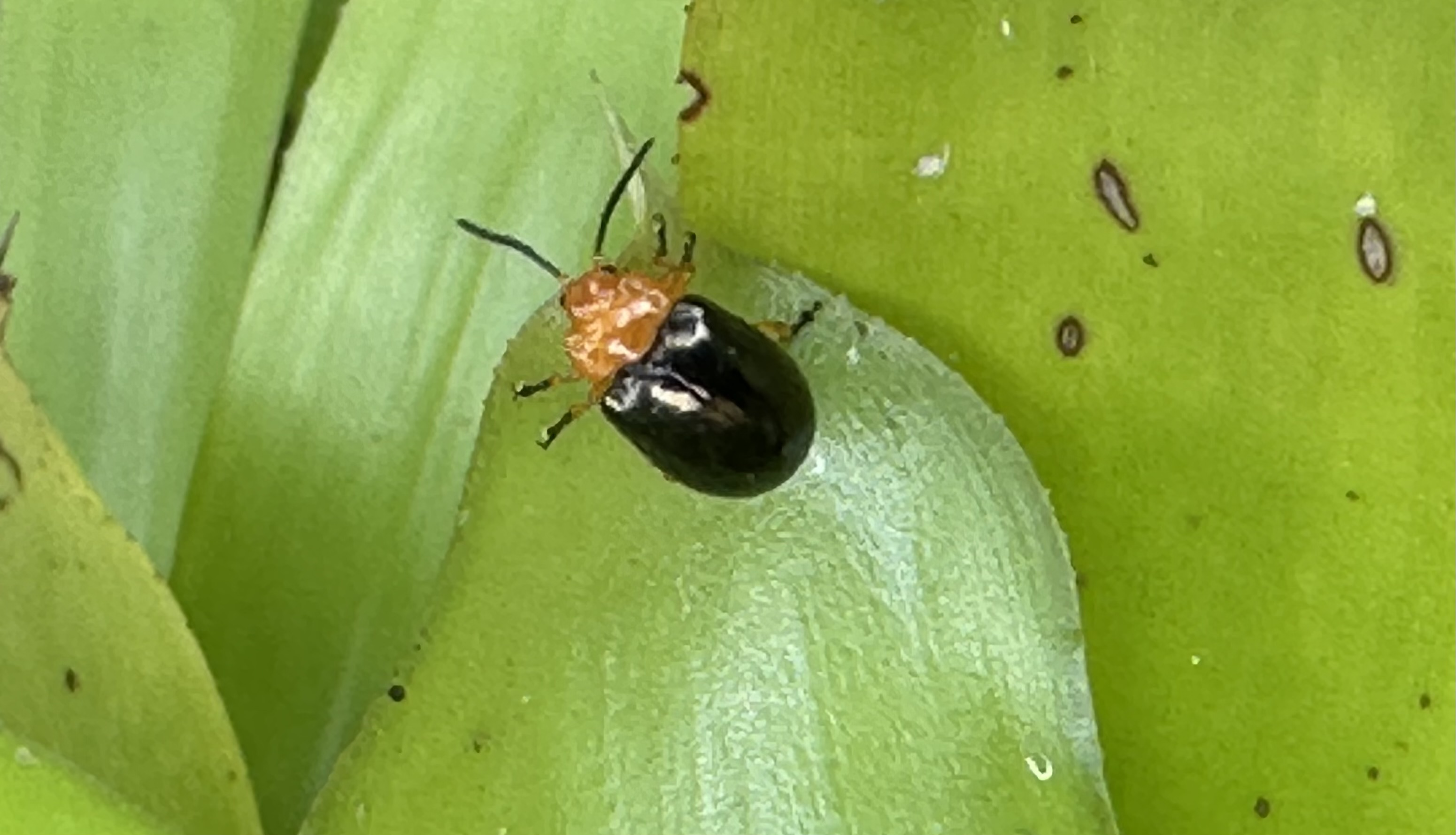
- A specimen photographed in Sydney, New South Wales

Scientific classification
- Kingdom: Animalia
- Phylum: Arthropoda
- Class: Insecta
- Order: Coleoptera
- Suborder: Polyphaga
- Infraorder: Cucujiformia
- Family: Chrysomelidae
- Genus: Lamprolina
- Species: L. simillimus

Binomial name
- Lamprolina simillimus Baly, 1855

Synonyms
- Lamprolina simillima

= Lamprolina simillimus =

Species of beetle

Lamprolina simillima is an Australian beetle species in the family of leaf beetles (Chrysomelidae), which is found in eastern Australia, in Queensland and New South Wales.
