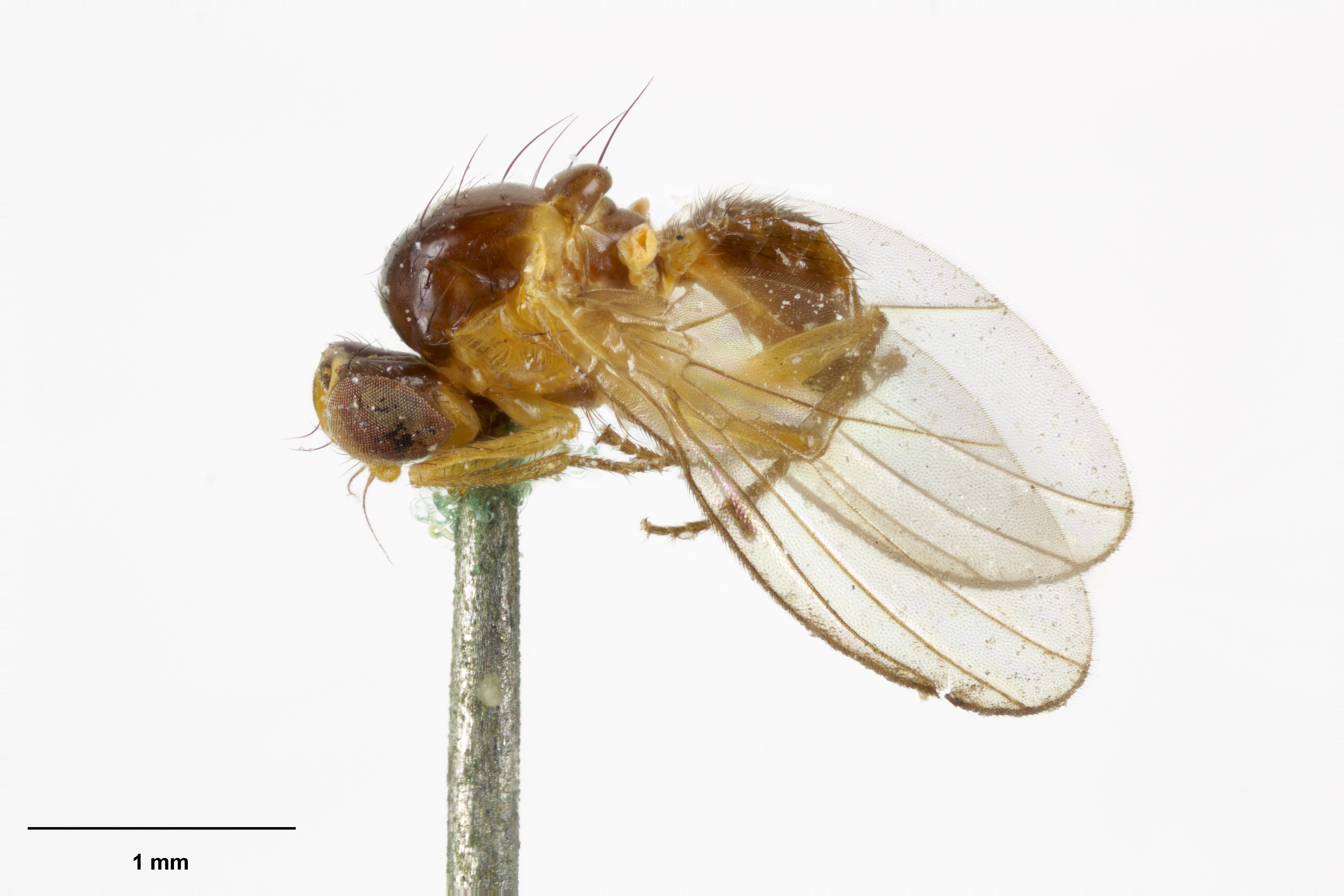

Scientific classification
- Kingdom: Animalia
- Phylum: Arthropoda
- Class: Insecta
- Order: Diptera
- Family: Agromyzidae
- Subfamily: Phytomyzinae
- Genus: Phytoliriomyza
- Species: P. flavopleura

Binomial name
- Phytoliriomyza flavopleura (Watt, 1923)

Synonyms
- Agromyza flavopleura Watt, 1923; Phytoliriomyza flavopleura var. casta Watt, 1923

= Phytoliriomyza flavopleura =

Species of fly

Phytoliriomyza flavopleura is a species of fly in the family Agromyzidae.

== Distribution ==
New Zealand.
