= Phytoliriomyza variegata =

Scientific classification
- Kingdom: Animalia
- Phylum: Arthropoda
- Clade: Pancrustacea
- Class: Insecta
- Order: Diptera
- Family: Agromyzidae
- Subfamily: Phytomyzinae
- Genus: Phytoliriomyza
- Species: P. variegata

Binomial name
- Phytoliriomyza variegata (Meigen, 1830)

Synonyms
- Agromyza astragali Brischke, 1881; Agromyza variegata Meigen, 1830

Species of fly

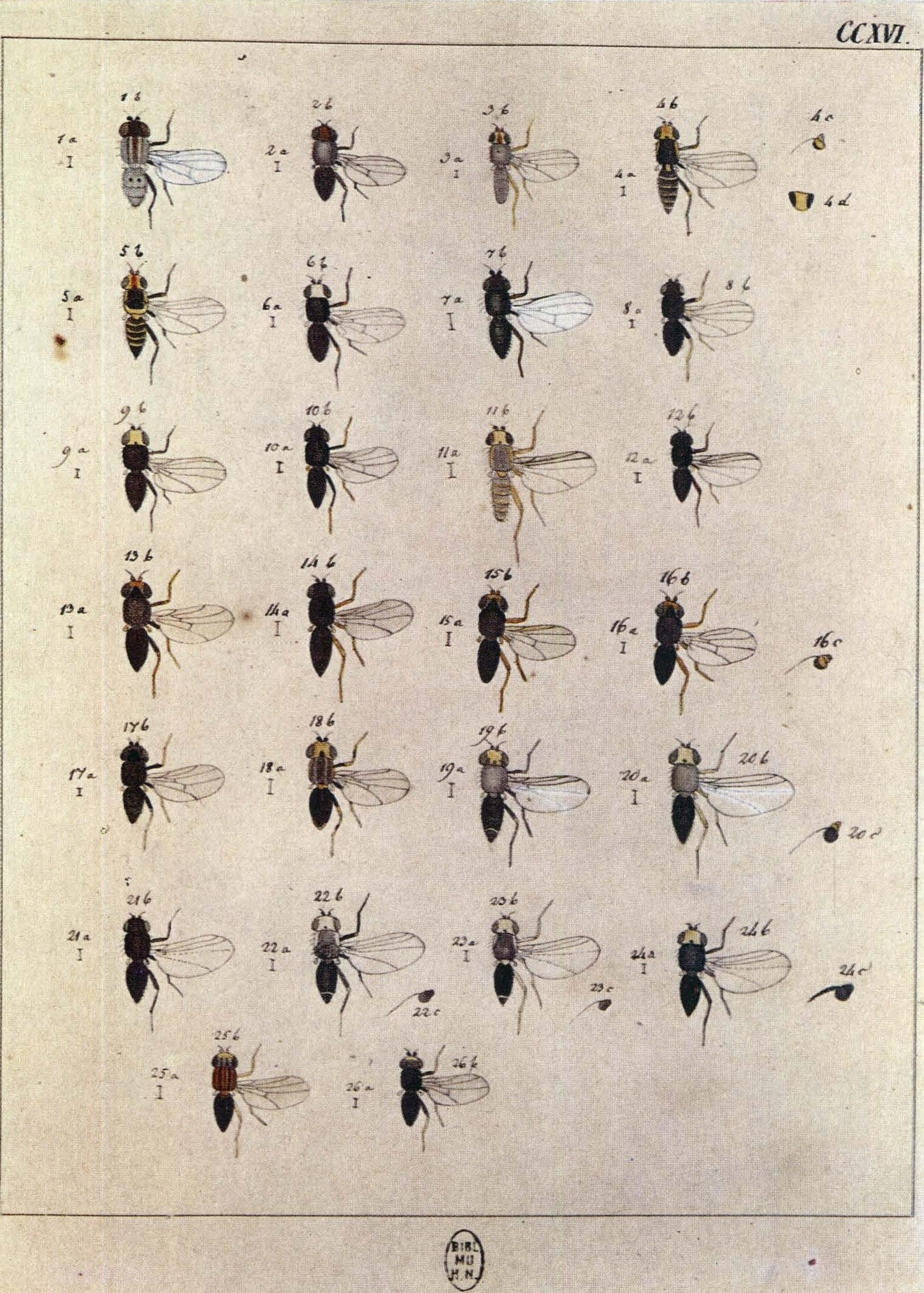
5 Agromyza variegata synonym of Phytoliriomyza variegata (Meigen, 1830)

Phytoliriomyza variegata is a species of fly in the family Agromyzidae.

== Distribution ==
India, Europe.
