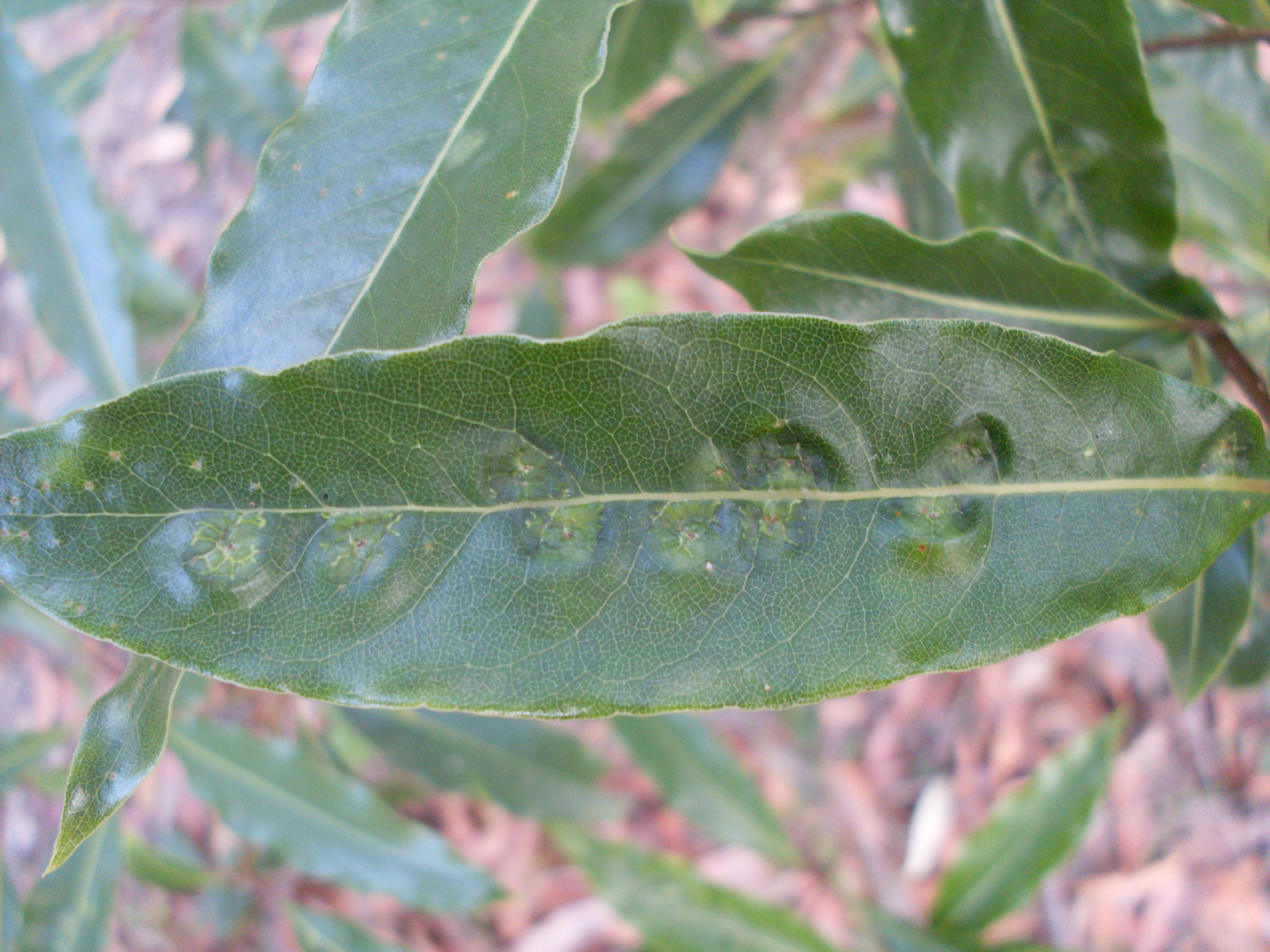
- Phytoliriomyza pittosporophylli galls in leaf of Pittosporum undulatum

Scientific classification
- Kingdom: Animalia
- Phylum: Arthropoda
- Clade: Pancrustacea
- Class: Insecta
- Order: Diptera
- Family: Agromyzidae
- Subfamily: Phytomyzinae
- Genus: Phytoliriomyza
- Species: P. pittosporophylli

Binomial name
- Phytoliriomyza pittosporophylli (Hering, 1962)

Synonyms
- Phytobia (Praspedomyza) pittosporophylli Hering, 1962

= Phytoliriomyza pittosporophylli =

Species of fly

Phytoliriomyza pittosporophylli is an Australian species of fly in the family Agromyzidae.

== Description ==
Phytoliriomyza pittosporophylli and the similar-looking P. pittosporocaulis both have a pale frons, a lunule approximately in the form of a semicircle, reclinate orbital setulae, a black scutellum, pale halteres, and dorso-central bristles in a 3+1 arrangement. It can be distinguished from P. pittosporocaulis by the third antennal segment being entirely black.

The larva has 8-10 bulbs in each posterior spiracle; this differs from the 4-6 bulbs of P. pittosporocaulis.

Full descriptions of the adult and larva (and the gall produced by the latter) were given by Hering.

== Ecology ==
Larvae of this species form circular leaf galls on sweet pittosporum (Pittosporum undulatum). Galls are usually near the midrib but can also occur elsewhere in the leaf.
