= Phytoliriomyza melampyga =

- Phytoliriomyza melampyga video

Scientific classification
- Kingdom: Animalia
- Phylum: Arthropoda
- Class: Insecta
- Order: Diptera
- Family: Agromyzidae
- Subfamily: Phytomyzinae
- Genus: Phytoliriomyza
- Species: P. melampyga

Binomial name
- Phytoliriomyza melampyga (Loew, 1869)

Synonyms
- Agromyza flaviventris Johnson, 1902; Agromyza impatientis Brischke, 1881; Agromyza melampyga Loew, 1869

Species of fly

Phytoliriomyza melampyga is a species of fly in the family Agromyzidae. Mesonotum with yellow bands. Scutellum yellow. Frons yellow. The larva mines Himalayan balsam (Impatiens glandulifera).

== Distribution ==
Canada, United States, Europe.
