= Phyllocharis undulata =

Scientific classification
- Kingdom: Animalia
- Phylum: Arthropoda
- Clade: Pancrustacea
- Class: Insecta
- Order: Coleoptera
- Suborder: Polyphaga
- Infraorder: Cucujiformia
- Family: Chrysomelidae
- Genus: Phyllocharis
- Species: P. undulata

Binomial name
- Phyllocharis undulata (Linnaeus, 1763)

Synonyms
- Chrysomela undulata Linnaeus, 1763

Species of beetle

Phyllocharis undulata is a species of leaf beetle, native to Southeast Asia. It is found in Laos, Cambodia, Vietnam, Peninsular Malaysia, Singapore, Java, Lombok and Timor.

== Description ==
Phyllocharis undulata feeds on various species of Clerodendrum (Verbenaceae), including Clerodendrum inerme, Clerodendrum chinense and Clerodendrum calamitosum.

== Pest control ==
It has been considered as a biological control agent against Clerodendrum chinense, which has become a serious noxious weed and invasive species on some Pacific Islands in the southwestern Pacific Ocean, including Samoa, Niue, and Fiji.

== See also ==
- Beneficial insects
