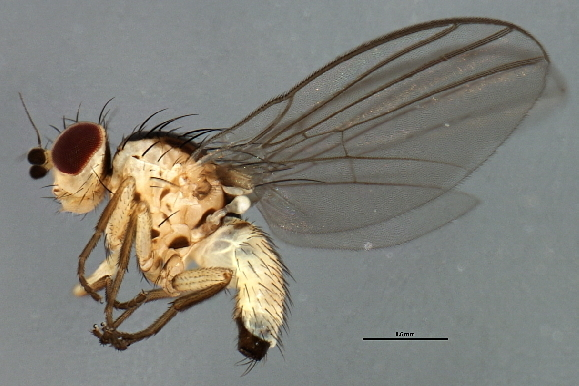

Scientific classification
- Kingdom: Animalia
- Phylum: Arthropoda
- Class: Insecta
- Order: Diptera
- Family: Agromyzidae
- Subfamily: Phytomyzinae
- Genus: Phytoliriomyza
- Species: P. dorsata

Binomial name
- Phytoliriomyza dorsata (Siebke, 1864)

Synonyms
- Agromyza dorsata Siebke, 1864; Agromyza reverberata Malloch, 1924; Liriomyza striata Hendel, 1931

= Phytoliriomyza dorsata =

Species of fly

Phytoliriomyza dorsata is a species of fly in the family Agromyzidae.

== Distribution ==
It is found in Europe, east Palaearctic (Russia, Iran, Japan), and (possibly introduced) North America (Canada, United States).

== Description ==
Wing length is 2.1–2.5 mm (0.083–0.098 in) in males and 1.9–2.6 mm (0.075–0.102 in) in females.
