= Phytoliriomyza felti =

Scientific classification
- Kingdom: Animalia
- Phylum: Arthropoda
- Class: Insecta
- Order: Diptera
- Family: Agromyzidae
- Subfamily: Phytomyzinae
- Genus: Phytoliriomyza
- Species: P. felti

Binomial name
- Phytoliriomyza felti (Malloch, 1914)

Synonyms
- Agromyza felti Malloch, 1914

Species of fly

Phytoliriomyza felti is a species of fly in the family Agromyzidae.

== Distribution ==
Canada, United States.
