= Phytoliriomyza flavopleuralis =

Scientific classification
- Kingdom: Animalia
- Phylum: Arthropoda
- Clade: Pancrustacea
- Class: Insecta
- Order: Diptera
- Family: Agromyzidae
- Subfamily: Phytomyzinae
- Genus: Phytoliriomyza
- Species: P. flavopleuralis

Binomial name
- Phytoliriomyza flavopleuralis Spencer, 1977

Species of fly

Phytoliriomyza flavopleuralis is a species of fly in the family Agromyzidae.

== Distribution ==
Australia.
