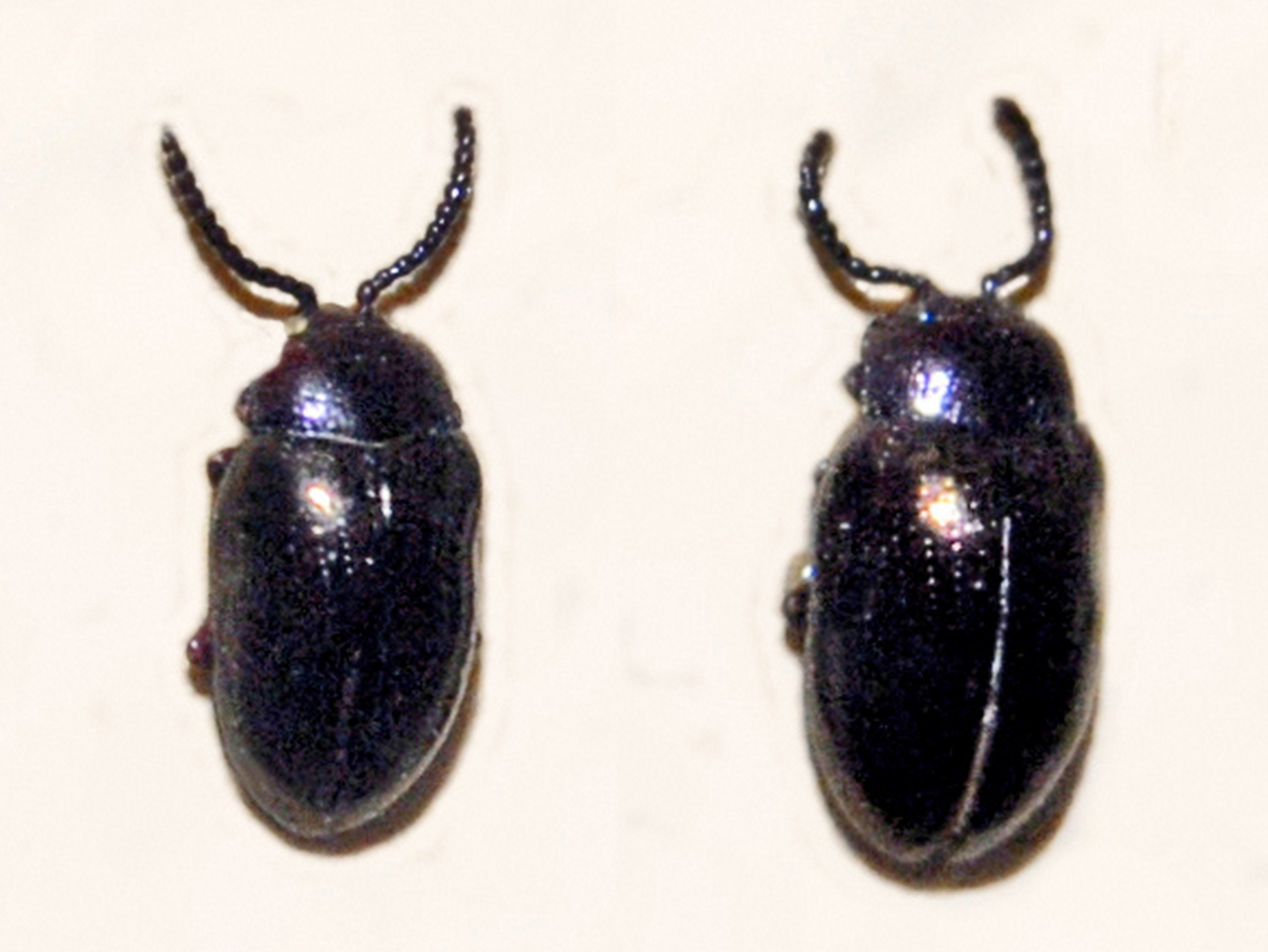
- Phyllocharis ewani from New Guinea

Scientific classification
- Kingdom: Animalia
- Phylum: Arthropoda
- Class: Insecta
- Order: Coleoptera
- Suborder: Polyphaga
- Infraorder: Cucujiformia
- Family: Chrysomelidae
- Genus: Phyllocharis
- Species: P. ewani

Binomial name
- Phyllocharis ewani Reid, 2006

Synonyms
- Phyllocharoides abdominalis Jacoby, 1894 (nec Phyllocharis abdominalis Baly, 1867)

= Phyllocharis ewani =

Species of beetle

Phyllocharis ewani is a species of leaf beetle native to New Guinea.

== History of research ==
Phyllocharis ewani was first described by Martin Jacoby in 1894, under the name Phyllocharoides abdominalis, from specimens collected from Humboldt Bay in New Guinea (now known as Yos Sudarso Bay), as the only member of the genus Phyllocharoides. Phyllocharoides is now considered a synonym of Phyllocharis, resulting in the species becoming a junior homonym of Phyllocharis abdominalis Baly, 1867; because of this, it was renamed to Phyllocharis ewani by Chris Reid in 2006.

== Distribution ==
This species is native to New Guinea.
