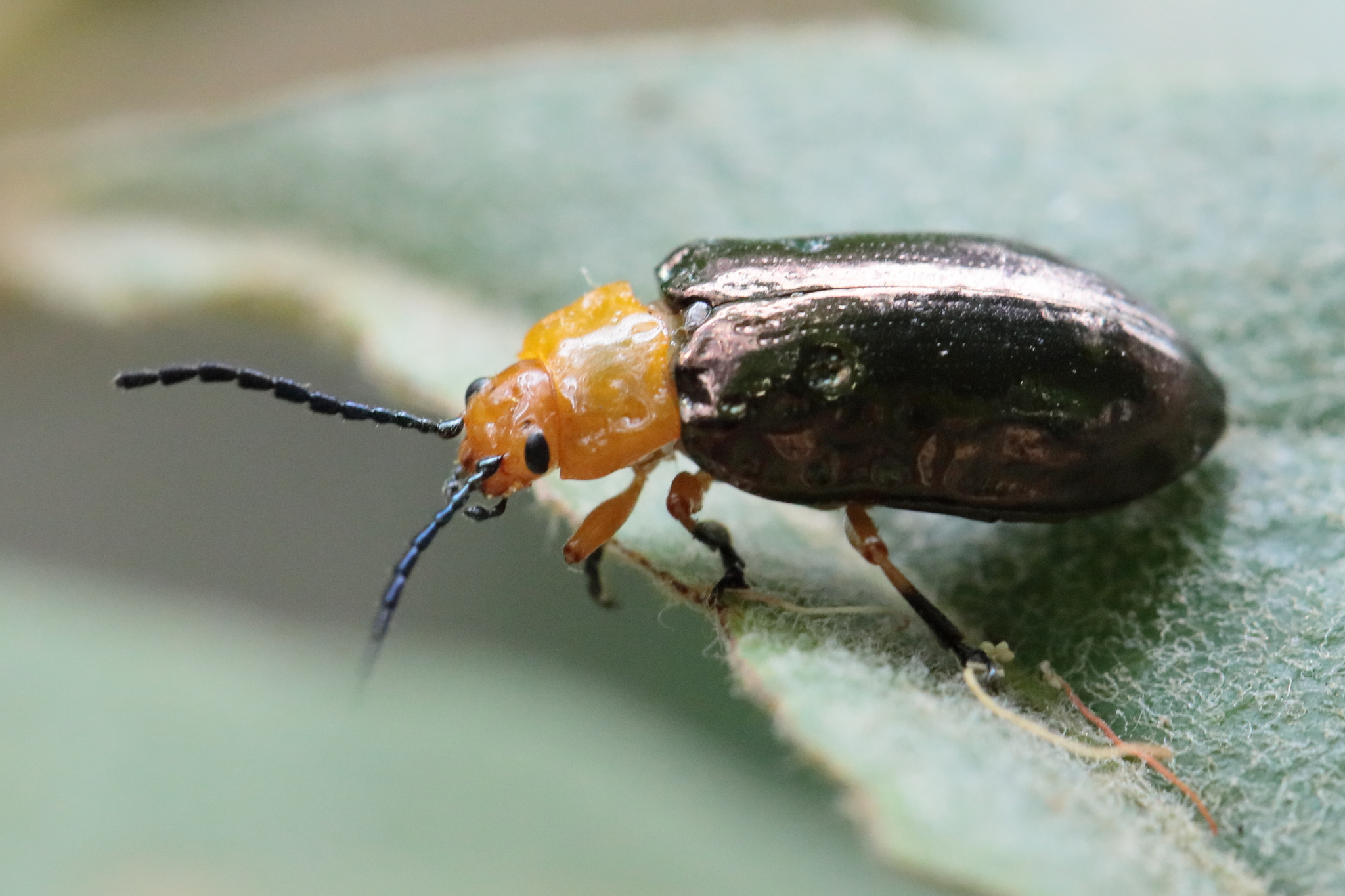

Scientific classification
- Kingdom: Animalia
- Phylum: Arthropoda
- Class: Insecta
- Order: Coleoptera
- Suborder: Polyphaga
- Infraorder: Cucujiformia
- Family: Chrysomelidae
- Genus: Lamprolina
- Species: L. aeneipennis

Binomial name
- Lamprolina aeneipennis (Boisduval, 1835)

Synonyms
- Phyllocharis aeneipennis Boisduval, 1835

= Lamprolina aeneipennis =

Species of beetle

Lamprolina aeneipennis is an Australian beetle species in the family of leaf beetles (Chrysomelidae), which is found in eastern Australia, in Queensland, New South Wales and Victoria (according to ALA), but in New South Wales only (according to the Australian Faunal Directory). It was first described in 1835 by Boisduval as Phyllocharis aeneipennis.

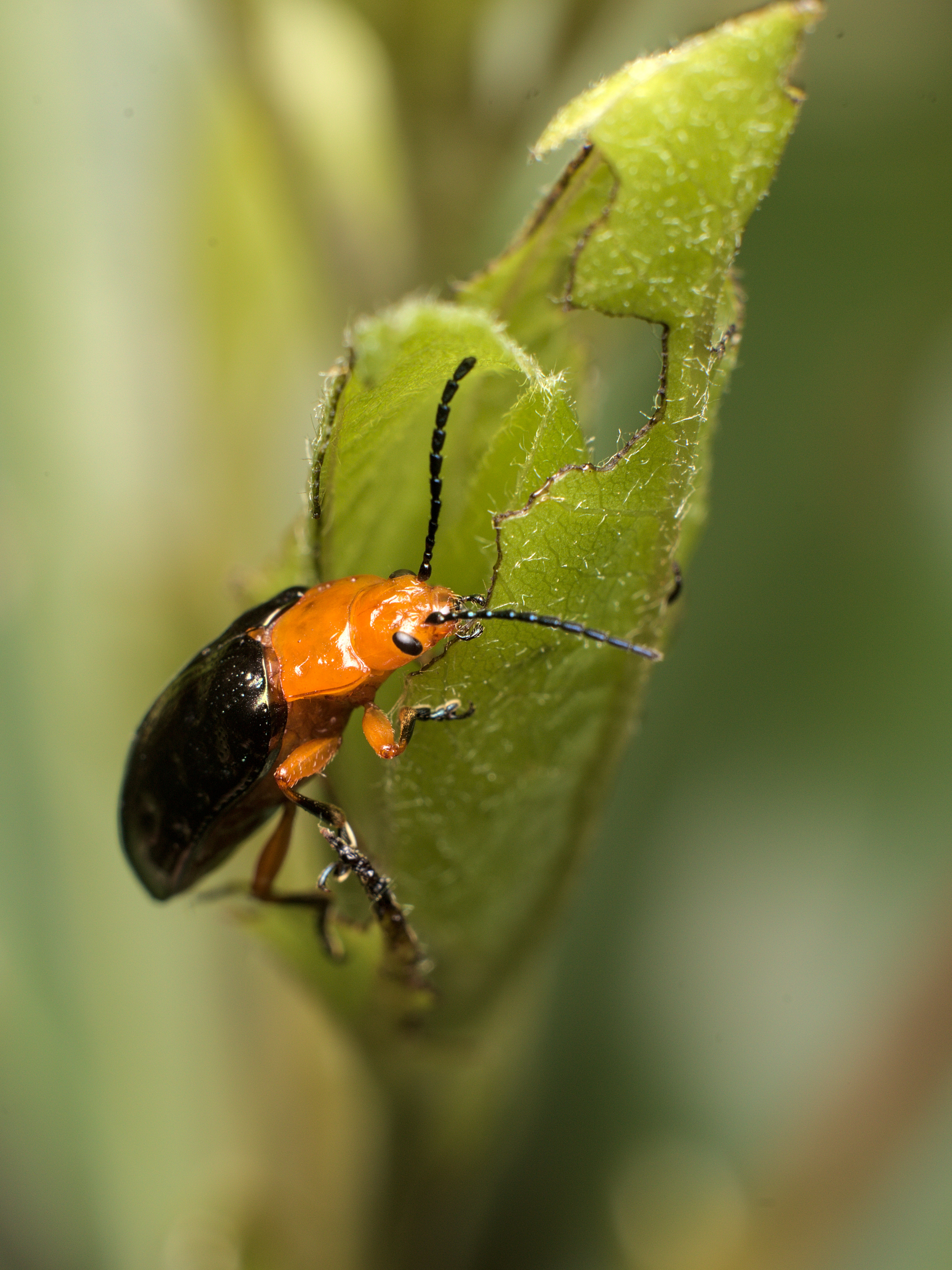
