= Teuchothrips =

Scientific classification
- Kingdom: Animalia
- Phylum: Arthropoda
- Class: Insecta
- Order: Thysanoptera
- Family: Phlaeothripidae
- Genus: Teuchothrips; Hood, 1919

Genus of thrips

Teuchothrips is a genus of thrips in the family Phlaeothripidae.

== Species ==
- Teuchothrips acripilus
- Teuchothrips ater
- Teuchothrips badiipennis
- Teuchothrips brevis
- Teuchothrips burroughsi
- Teuchothrips circinans
- Teuchothrips clavipilus
- Teuchothrips cleistanthi
- Teuchothrips connatus
- Teuchothrips disjunctus
- Teuchothrips eugeniae
- Teuchothrips froggatti
- Teuchothrips kraussi
- Teuchothrips longiseta
- Teuchothrips longus
- Teuchothrips melaleucae
- Teuchothrips minor
- Teuchothrips noumeaensis
- Teuchothrips ornatus
- Teuchothrips pacificus
- Teuchothrips simplicipennis
- Teuchothrips sodalis
- Teuchothrips vicinus
