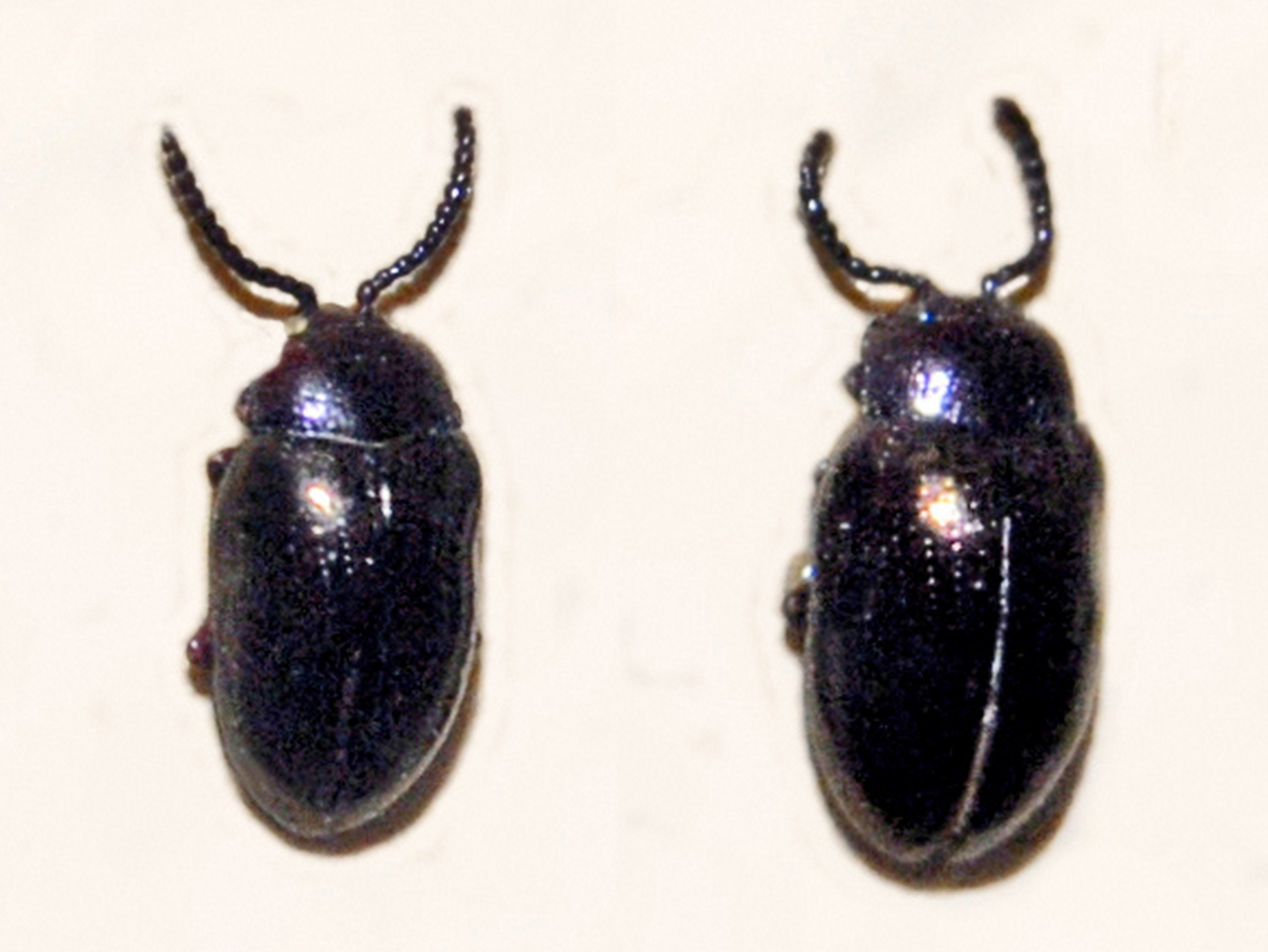
- Phyllocharis ewani

Scientific classification
- Kingdom: Animalia
- Phylum: Arthropoda
- Class: Insecta
- Order: Coleoptera
- Suborder: Polyphaga
- Infraorder: Cucujiformia
- Family: Chrysomelidae
- Subfamily: Chrysomelinae
- Genus: Phyllocharis; Dalman, 1824

Synonyms
- Phyllocharoides Jacoby, 1894

= Phyllocharis =

Genus of beetles

Phyllocharis is a genus of leaf beetle belonging to the family Chrysomelidae. It occurs from Southeast Asia to Australia.

== Selected species ==
- Phyllocharis acroleuca Baly, 1862
- Phyllocharis biceps Lea, 1903
- Phyllocharis blackburni (Jacoby, 1898)
- Phyllocharis cyanicornis (Fabricius, 1801)
- Phyllocharis cyanipes (Fabricius, 1775)
- Phyllocharis ewani Reid, 2006
- Phyllocharis eximia Baly, 1878
- Phyllocharis flexuosa Baly, 1855
- Phyllocharis gracilis Jacoby, 1898
- Phyllocharis hieroglyphica Lea, 1903
- Phyllocharis hilaris Lea, 1903
- Phyllocharis ianthinipennis Lea, 1903
- Phyllocharis impressicollis Jacoby, 1885
- Phyllocharis jansoni Baly, 1878
- Phyllocharis leoparda Baly, 1855
- Phyllocharis marmorata Lea, 1903
- Phyllocharis melanospila Baly, 1862
- Phyllocharis nigricornis (Fabricius, 1775)
- Phyllocharis ornata Baly, 1862
- Phyllocharis proxima Weise, 1923
- Phyllocharis sculpticeps Lea, 1915
- Phyllocharis sinuata (Olivier, 1807)
- Phyllocharis undulata (Linnaeus, 1763)
- Phyllocharis wollumbina (Daccordi, 2003)
