= Ophiomyia coniceps =

Scientific classification
- Kingdom: Animalia
- Phylum: Arthropoda
- Clade: Pancrustacea
- Class: Insecta
- Order: Diptera
- Family: Agromyzidae
- Subfamily: Agromyzinae
- Genus: Ophiomyia
- Species: O. coniceps

Binomial name
- Ophiomyia coniceps (Malloch, 1915)

Synonyms
- Agromyza coniceps Malloch, 1915

Species of fly

Ophiomyia coniceps is a species of fly in the family Agromyzidae.

== Distribution ==
Canada, United States.
