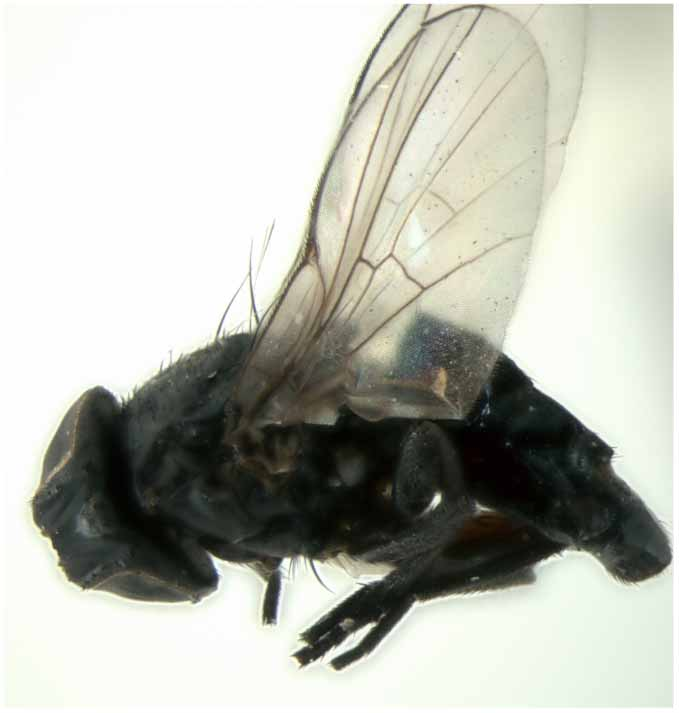
- Ophiomyia simplex

Scientific classification
- Kingdom: Animalia
- Phylum: Arthropoda
- Class: Insecta
- Order: Diptera
- Family: Agromyzidae
- Subfamily: Agromyzinae
- Genus: Ophiomyia; Brazhnikov, 1897

Synonyms
- Aulomyza Enderlein, 1936; Carinagromyza Sasakawa, 1954; Hexomyza Enderlein, 1936; Kleinschmidtimyia Spencer, 1986; Penetagromyza Spencer, 1959; Siphonomyza Enderlein, 1936; Siridomyza Enderlein, 1936; Solenomyza Enderlein, 1936; Stiropomyza Enderlein, 1936; Stirops Enderlein, 1936; Triopisopa Enderlein, 1936; Tylomyza Hendel, 1931

= Ophiomyia =

Genus of flies

Ophiomyia is a genus of flies in the family Agromyzidae.

In West Africa, the larvae of various species, such as Ophiomyia spencerella, Ophiomyia phaseola, and Ophiomyia centrosematis, are pests of cultivated bean crops.

== Species ==
- Ophiomyia aberrans (Spencer, 1959)
- Ophiomyia abutilivora Spencer, 1986
- Ophiomyia abutilonicaulis (Spencer, 1977)
- Ophiomyia acutalis (Spencer, 1959)
- Ophiomyia adunca Guglya, 2014
- Ophiomyia aeneonitens (Strobl, 1893)
- Ophiomyia akbari (Singh & Ipe, 1971)
- Ophiomyia albivenis Spencer, 1959
- Ophiomyia alliariae Hering, 1957
- Ophiomyia aloephaga (Spencer, 1990)
- Ophiomyia aloes (Spencer, 1959)
- Ophiomyia alternantherae (Spencer, 1963)
- Ophiomyia alysicarpi (Bezzi, 1928)
- Ophiomyia ambrosia Spencer, 1981
- Ophiomyia anguliceps (Malloch, 1914)
- Ophiomyia angustilunula Spencer, 1963
- Ophiomyia anomala Spencer, 1961
- Ophiomyia apta Spencer, 1981
- Ophiomyia aquileigana Lundqvist, 1947
- Ophiomyia arabica (Deeming, 2006)
- Ophiomyia aricella Spencer, 1982
- Ophiomyia aricensis Spencer, 1982
- Ophiomyia arizonensis Spencer, 1986
- Ophiomyia asparagi Spencer, 1964
- Ophiomyia asterovora Spencer, 1969
- Ophiomyia asymmetrica Spencer, 1986
- Ophiomyia atralis (Spencer, 1961)
- Ophiomyia atriplicis Spencer, 1984
- Ophiomyia australis Guglya, 2013
- Ophiomyia balcanica Cerný, Barták, Kubík & Vála, 2022
- Ophiomyia banffensis Spencer, 1969
- Ophiomyia beckeri (Hendel, 1923)
- Ophiomyia bengalensis Singh & Ipe, 1973
- Ophiomyia berii Garg, 1971
- Ophiomyia bernardinensis Spencer, 1981
- Ophiomyia bispina Gu, 1991
- Ophiomyia bivibrissa Gu, 1991
- Ophiomyia blepharidis (Spencer, 1960)
- Ophiomyia bohemica Cerný, 1994
- Ophiomyia boninensis (Spencer, 1963)
- Ophiomyia boulderensis Spencer, 1986
- Ophiomyia buccata Hendel, 1931
- Ophiomyia buskei (Frost, 1936)
- Ophiomyia cabanae Valladares, 1986
- Ophiomyia camarae Spencer, 1963
- Ophiomyia campanularia (Singh & Garg, 1970)
- Ophiomyia campanularum Starý, 1930
- Ophiomyia capitolia Lonsdale, 2021
- Ophiomyia caraganae (Gu, 1991)
- Ophiomyia caribbea (Spencer, 1973)
- Ophiomyia carolinae Spencer, 1986
- Ophiomyia carolinensis Spencer, 1986
- Ophiomyia cassiae (Spencer, 1963)
- Ophiomyia centaureae (Spencer, 1966)
- Ophiomyia centrosematis (Meijere, 1940)
- Ophiomyia chancayana Sasakawa, 1992
- Ophiomyia chinensis Sasakawa, 1988
- Ophiomyia chondrillae Spencer, 1986
- Ophiomyia chromolaenae Etienne & Martinez, 2002
- Ophiomyia cicerivora Spencer, 1961
- Ophiomyia cichorii Hering, 1949
- Ophiomyia colei Spencer, 1965
- Ophiomyia collini Spencer, 1971
- Ophiomyia commendata Spencer, 1981
- Ophiomyia congregata (Malloch, 1913)
- Ophiomyia coniceps (Malloch, 1915)
- Ophiomyia conspicua (Spencer, 1961)
- Ophiomyia cornifera Hendel, 1920
- Ophiomyia cornuta Meijere, 1910
- Ophiomyia costaricensis Spencer, 1983
- Ophiomyia crispa Guglya, 2013
- Ophiomyia crotalariella Spencer, 1990
- Ophiomyia cunctata (Hendel, 1920)
- Ophiomyia cuprea Lonsdale, 2021
- Ophiomyia cursae Pakalniškis, 1997
- Ophiomyia curvibrissata (Frost, 1936)
- Ophiomyia curvipalpis (Zetterstedt, 1848)
- Ophiomyia cymbonoti Spencer, 1977
- Ophiomyia debilis Spencer, 1981
- Ophiomyia decembris (Spencer, 1959)
- Ophiomyia deceptiva Spencer, 1977
- Ophiomyia definita Spencer, 1971
- Ophiomyia delecta Spencer, 1981
- Ophiomyia delphinii Hendel, 1928
- Ophiomyia devia Spencer, 1981
- Ophiomyia dhofarensis Deeming, 2006
- Ophiomyia dianellae (Kleinschmidt, 1961)
- Ophiomyia disordens Pakalniškis, 1998
- Ophiomyia dissimilis Spencer, 1973
- Ophiomyia dulcis Spencer, 1977
- Ophiomyia dumosa Sasakawa, 2004
- Ophiomyia duodecima Spencer, 1969
- Ophiomyia eldorensis Spencer, 1986
- Ophiomyia eleutherensis (Spencer, 1973)
- Ophiomyia eucodonus Hering, 1960
- Ophiomyia euthamiae Eiseman & Lonsdale, 2018
- Ophiomyia fasciculata (Malloch, 1934)
- Ophiomyia fasciculusalba Guglya, 2013
- Ophiomyia fastella Spencer, 1981
- Ophiomyia fennoniensis Spencer, 1976
- Ophiomyia fera Spencer, 1977
- Ophiomyia ferina Spencer, 1973
- Ophiomyia ferox Spencer, 1977
- Ophiomyia fici Spencer & Hill, 1976
- Ophiomyia fida Spencer, 1981
- Ophiomyia flagellata Sasakawa, 2013
- Ophiomyia floccusa Arevalo, 1993
- Ophiomyia foliaphila Guglya, 2021
- Ophiomyia frosti Spencer, 1986
- Ophiomyia furcata Sasakawa, 1988
- Ophiomyia galii Hering, 1937
- Ophiomyia galiodes Lonsdale, 2021
- Ophiomyia gemina Spencer, 1977
- Ophiomyia gentilis Spencer, 1973
- Ophiomyia georginae Cerný, 2007
- Ophiomyia gnaphalii Hering, 1949
- Ophiomyia gracilimentula Sasakawa, 2005
- Ophiomyia gressitti Sasakawa, 1963
- Ophiomyia halimodendronis (Zlobin, 1998)
- Ophiomyia haydeni Spencer, 1973
- Ophiomyia helichrysi Spencer, 1960
- Ophiomyia helios Lonsdale, 2021
- Ophiomyia heracleivora Spencer, 1957
- Ophiomyia heringi Starý, 1930
- Ophiomyia hieracii Spencer, 1964
- Ophiomyia hirticeps (Malloch, 1934)
- Ophiomyia hornabrooki Spencer, 1977
- Ophiomyia hortobagyi Cerný, 2015
- Ophiomyia hungarica Cerný, 2015
- Ophiomyia imparispina Sasakawa, 2006
- Ophiomyia improvisa Spencer, 1966
- Ophiomyia inaequabilis (Hendel, 1931)
- Ophiomyia indigoferae (Kleinschmidt, 1961)
- Ophiomyia ingens Spencer, 1962
- Ophiomyia insularis (Malloch, 1913)
- Ophiomyia io Pakalniškis, 1998
- Ophiomyia ivinskisi Pakalniškis, 1997
- Ophiomyia jacintensis Spencer, 1981
- Ophiomyia kalia Lonsdale, 2021
- Ophiomyia kaputarensis Spencer, 1977
- Ophiomyia kenyae Spencer, 1985
- Ophiomyia kiefferi (Tavares, 1901)
- Ophiomyia kilembensis Spencer, 1985
- Ophiomyia kilimanii Spencer, 1985
- Ophiomyia kingsmerensis Spencer, 1969
- Ophiomyia kireshiensis Guglya, 2020
- Ophiomyia koreana Cerný, 2007
- Ophiomyia kwansonis Sasakawa, 1961
- Ophiomyia labiatalis Spencer, 1959
- Ophiomyia labiatarum Hering, 1937
- Ophiomyia lacertosa Spencer, 1973
- Ophiomyia lantanae (Froggatt, 1919)
- Ophiomyia lappivora (Koizumi, 1953)
- Ophiomyia lassa Spencer, 1981
- Ophiomyia laticolis Lonsdale, 2021
- Ophiomyia lauta (Spencer, 1969)
- Ophiomyia legitima Spencer, 1973
- Ophiomyia leprosa Sasakawa, 2005
- Ophiomyia levata Spencer, 1981
- Ophiomyia lippiae Spencer, 1966
- Ophiomyia longilingua (Hendel, 1920)
- Ophiomyia lucidata Spencer, 1961
- Ophiomyia lucidella Spencer, 1977
- Ophiomyia lunatica Spencer, 1961
- Ophiomyia lutzi Spencer, 1977
- Ophiomyia maculata Spencer, 1981
- Ophiomyia magna Spencer, 1983
- Ophiomyia maipuensis Sasakawa, 1994
- Ophiomyia major (Strobl, 1898)
- Ophiomyia malalata Guglya, 2013
- Ophiomyia malitiosa Spencer, 1981
- Ophiomyia mallecensis Spencer, 1982
- Ophiomyia marellii (Brèthes, 1920)
- Ophiomyia marquesana (Malloch, 1933)
- Ophiomyia maura (Meigen, 1838)
- Ophiomyia melanagromyzae Spencer, 1977
- Ophiomyia melandricaulis Hering, 1943
- Ophiomyia melandryi Meijere, 1924
- Ophiomyia melica Spencer, 1981
- Ophiomyia memorabilis Spencer, 1974
- Ophiomyia mendica Martinez, 1992
- Ophiomyia mesonotata Spencer, 1961
- Ophiomyia micra Spencer, 1963
- Ophiomyia mimuli Eiseman & Lonsdale, 2018
- Ophiomyia mohelensis Cerný, 1994
- Ophiomyia monticola Sehgal, 1968
- Ophiomyia moravica Cerný, 1994
- Ophiomyia mukhorytsa Guglya, 2020
- Ophiomyia mussauensis Spencer, 1966
- Ophiomyia nabali Eiseman & Lonsdale, 2021
- Ophiomyia nassauensis (Spencer, 1973)
- Ophiomyia nasuta (Melander, 1913)
- Ophiomyia nealae Sasakawa, 1964
- Ophiomyia negrosensis Spencer, 1962
- Ophiomyia nigerrima Spencer, 1959
- Ophiomyia nona Spencer, 1969
- Ophiomyia nuginiensis (Spencer, 1977)
- Ophiomyia obstipa Spencer, 1973
- Ophiomyia ocimi Spencer, 1965
- Ophiomyia ocimivora Spencer, 1985
- Ophiomyia octava Spencer, 1969
- Ophiomyia ononidis Spencer, 1966
- Ophiomyia orbiculata (Hendel, 1931)
- Ophiomyia orientalis Cerný, 1994
- Ophiomyia otfordensis Spencer, 1977
- Ophiomyia oviformis Sasakawa & Fan, 1985
- Ophiomyia ozeana Sasakawa, 1998
- Ophiomyia paektusanica Cerný, 2007
- Ophiomyia pannonica Cerný, 2015
- Ophiomyia pappi Cerný, 2015
- Ophiomyia papuana Spencer, 1977
- Ophiomyia paramaura Pakalniškis, 1994
- Ophiomyia paramonovi (Spencer, 1963)
- Ophiomyia parda Eiseman & Lonsdale, 2018
- Ophiomyia parva Spencer, 1986
- Ophiomyia parvella (Spencer, 1973)
- Ophiomyia parvula Spencer, 1977
- Ophiomyia penicillata Hendel, 1920
- Ophiomyia perversa Spencer, 1965
- Ophiomyia peshokia Singh & Ipe, 1973
- Ophiomyia pfaffiae (Spencer, 1963)
- Ophiomyia phalloides Sasakawa, 2004
- Ophiomyia phaseoli (Tryon, 1895)
- Ophiomyia phaseoloides Martinez, 1992
- Ophiomyia pinguis (Fallén, 1820)
- Ophiomyia pisi (Kleinschmidt, 1961)
- Ophiomyia placida (Spencer, 1963)
- Ophiomyia praecisa Spencer, 1969
- Ophiomyia pretoriensis Spencer, 1960
- Ophiomyia prima Spencer, 1969
- Ophiomyia productella Spencer, 1960
- Ophiomyia pseudonasuta Cerný, 1994
- Ophiomyia puerarivora Sasakawa, 1981
- Ophiomyia pulicaria (Meigen, 1830)
- Ophiomyia pullata Spencer, 1977
- Ophiomyia punctata Guglya, 2013
- Ophiomyia punctohalterata (Frost, 1936)
- Ophiomyia quadrifida Sasakawa, 2013
- Ophiomyia quadrispinosa Çikman & Sasakawa, 2011
- Ophiomyia quarta Spencer, 1969
- Ophiomyia quinta Spencer, 1969
- Ophiomyia ranunculicaulis Hering, 1949
- Ophiomyia rapta Hendel, 1931
- Ophiomyia recticulipennis Singh & Ipe, 1973
- Ophiomyia rhodesiensis Spencer, 1959
- Ophiomyia ricini (Meijere, 1922)
- Ophiomyia rostrata (Hendel, 1920)
- Ophiomyia rotata (Spencer, 1965)
- Ophiomyia rugula Eiseman & Lonsdale, 2021
- Ophiomyia sarothamni (Hendel, 1923)
- Ophiomyia sasakawai Spencer & Martinez, 1987
- Ophiomyia scaevolana Shiao & Wu, 1997
- Ophiomyia secunda Spencer, 1969
- Ophiomyia senecionina Hering, 1944
- Ophiomyia sepilokensis Sasakawa, 1991
- Ophiomyia septima Spencer, 1969
- Ophiomyia setituberosa Sasakawa, 1972
- Ophiomyia sexta Spencer, 1969
- Ophiomyia shastensis Spencer, 1981
- Ophiomyia shibatsuji (Kato, 1961)
- Ophiomyia sigmoidea Cerný, 2011
- Ophiomyia similans (Spencer, 1961)
- Ophiomyia similata (Malloch, 1918)
- Ophiomyia simplex (Loew, 1869)
- Ophiomyia skanensis Spencer, 1976
- Ophiomyia slovaca Cerný, 1994
- Ophiomyia solanicola Spencer, 1963
- Ophiomyia solanivora Spencer, 1961
- Ophiomyia solivaga Spencer, 1973
- Ophiomyia spencerella (Greathead, 1969)
- Ophiomyia spenceri Cerný, 1985
- Ophiomyia spicatae Spencer, 1963
- Ophiomyia spinicauda Sasakawa, 1972
- Ophiomyia sporoboli (Sasakawa, 1963)
- Ophiomyia spuriosa Spencer, 1960
- Ophiomyia stenophaga Pakalniškis, 1998
- Ophiomyia striata Sasakawa, 2013
- Ophiomyia stricklandi Sehgal, 1971
- Ophiomyia strigalis Spencer, 1963
- Ophiomyia suavis Spencer, 1966
- Ophiomyia subaberrans Spencer, 1986
- Ophiomyia subdefinita Spencer, 1986
- Ophiomyia subheracleivora Cerný, 1994
- Ophiomyia submaura Hering, 1926
- Ophiomyia subpraecisa Spencer, 1986
- Ophiomyia subtilis Spencer, 1977
- Ophiomyia sueciae Spencer, 1976
- Ophiomyia sulcata Arevalo, 1993
- Ophiomyia tenax Spencer, 1977
- Ophiomyia tertia Spencer, 1969
- Ophiomyia texana (Malloch, 1913)
- Ophiomyia texella Spencer, 1986
- Ophiomyia thalictricaulis Hering, 1962
- Ophiomyia tiliae (Couden, 1908)
- Ophiomyia toschiae (Spencer, 1981)
- Ophiomyia tovarensis Spencer, 1973
- Ophiomyia tranquilla Pakalniškis, 1998
- Ophiomyia tremenda Spencer, 1966
- Ophiomyia tschirnhausi Cerný, 2011
- Ophiomyia tuberculata (Becker, 1903)
- Ophiomyia tuberimentula Sasakawa, 1994
- Ophiomyia tunisiensis Spencer, 1977
- Ophiomyia ultima (Spencer, 1986)
- Ophiomyia undecima Spencer, 1969
- Ophiomyia ungarensis Cerný, 2015
- Ophiomyia valida Spencer, 1973
- Ophiomyia vanyushai Guglya, 2014
- Ophiomyia variegata (Spencer, 1977)
- Ophiomyia vasta Sasakawa, 2006
- Ophiomyia vegeta Spencer, 1977
- Ophiomyia verbasci Cerný, 1991
- Ophiomyia verbenivora Valladares, 1986
- Ophiomyia verdalis Spencer, 1959
- Ophiomyia versera Guglya, 2013
- Ophiomyia vibrissata (Malloch, 1913)
- Ophiomyia vignivora Spencer, 1973
- Ophiomyia vimmeri Cerný, 1994
- Ophiomyia virginiensis Spencer, 1986
- Ophiomyia visenda Spencer, 1965
- Ophiomyia vitiosa Spencer, 1964
- Ophiomyia vockerothi Spencer, 1986
- Ophiomyia vulgaris Spencer, 1982
- Ophiomyia wabamunensis Spencer, 1969
- Ophiomyia wikstroemiae (Kleinschmidt, 1961)
- Ophiomyia yolensis Spencer, 1981
- Ophiomyia zernyi Hendel, 1927
