= Ophiomyia maura =

Scientific classification
- Kingdom: Animalia
- Phylum: Arthropoda
- Class: Insecta
- Order: Diptera
- Family: Agromyzidae
- Subfamily: Agromyzinae
- Genus: Ophiomyia
- Species: O. maura

Binomial name
- Ophiomyia maura (Meigen, 1838)

Synonyms
- Agromyza affinis Malloch, 1913; Agromyza maura Meigen, 1838; Ophiomyia asteris Kuroda, 1954; Ophiomyia bicornis Kaltenbach, 1869

Species of fly

Ophiomyia maura is a species of fly in the family Agromyzidae.O. maura feeds mainly on True Goldenrods, including Solidago flexicaulis and Solidago altissima.

== Distribution ==
Alaska, to Manitoba.
