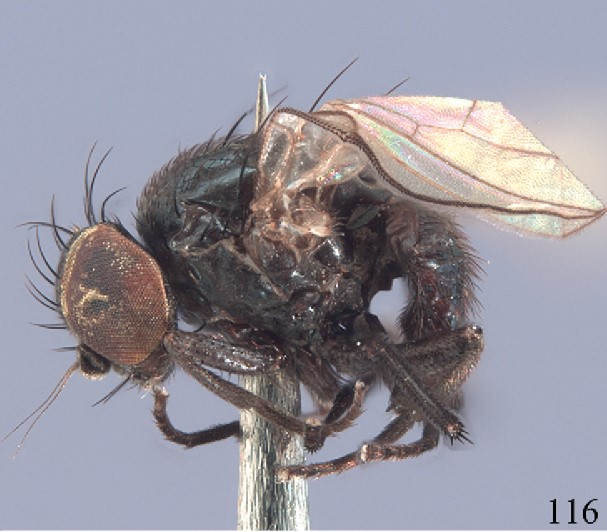
- A male Ophiomyia spencerella.

Scientific classification
- Kingdom: Animalia
- Phylum: Arthropoda
- Clade: Pancrustacea
- Class: Insecta
- Order: Diptera
- Family: Agromyzidae
- Subfamily: Agromyzinae
- Genus: Ophiomyia
- Species: O. spencerella

Binomial name
- Ophiomyia spencerella (Greathead, 1969)

Synonyms
- Melanagromyza spencerella Greathead, 1969

= Ophiomyia spencerella =

Species of fly

Ophiomyia spencerella is a species of fly in the family Agromyzidae.

== Distribution ==
Uganda, Kenya, Nigeria, Tanzania.
