= Ophiomyia pulicaria =

Scientific classification
- Kingdom: Animalia
- Phylum: Arthropoda
- Class: Insecta
- Order: Diptera
- Family: Agromyzidae
- Subfamily: Agromyzinae
- Genus: Ophiomyia
- Species: O. pulicaria

Binomial name
- Ophiomyia pulicaria (Meigen, 1830)

Synonyms
- Agromyza pulicaria Meigen, 1830

Species of fly

Ophiomyia pulicaria is a species of fly in the family Agromyzidae.

== Distribution ==
Alberta, British Columbia, Europe.
