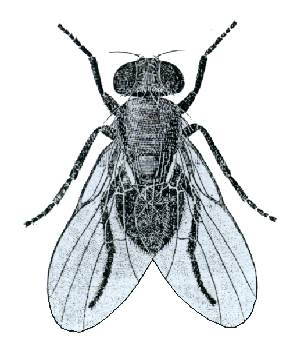

Scientific classification
- Kingdom: Animalia
- Phylum: Arthropoda
- Class: Insecta
- Order: Diptera
- Family: Agromyzidae
- Subfamily: Agromyzinae
- Genus: Ophiomyia
- Species: O. lantanae

Binomial name
- Ophiomyia lantanae (Froggatt, 1919)

Synonyms
- Agromyza lantanae Froggatt, 1919; Agromyza longicauda Curran, 1928

= Ophiomyia lantanae =

Species of fly

Ophiomyia lantanae is a species of fly in the family Agromyzidae. Native to the Americas, from the southern US to Brazil but had been introduced also to Australia as biological control agent of Lantana camara in 1914.

== Biology ==
This fly feeds on flowers and fruits of Lantana camara.

== Distribution ==
United States, Mexico, Puerto Rico, Cuba, Honduras, Costa Rica, Panama, Trinidad, Australia, Hawaii, India, Kenya, South Africa.
