= Ophiomyia camarae =

Scientific classification
- Kingdom: Animalia
- Phylum: Arthropoda
- Class: Insecta
- Order: Diptera
- Family: Agromyzidae
- Subfamily: Agromyzinae
- Genus: Ophiomyia
- Species: O. camarae

Binomial name
- Ophiomyia camarae Spencer, 1963

Species of fly

Ophiomyia camarae is a fly native to the Caribbean, Mexico, Central America and Florida but has been introduced as biological control agent to many countries outside the Americas as biological control agent of Lantana camara. The adult have a size of 1.5–2 mm are shiny, black with red compound eyes.

== Biology ==
This fly mines the leaves of Lantana camara.

== Distribution ==
Florida, Trinidad.
