= List of Cerodontha species =

This is a list of 285 species in Cerodontha, a genus of leaf miner flies in the family Agromyzidae.

== Cerodontha species ==
- Cerodontha aberdarensis Spencer, 1985
- Cerodontha abyssinica Spencer, 1961
- Cerodontha adunca Boucher, 2002
- Cerodontha affinis (Fallén, 1823)
- Cerodontha africana Spencer, 1985
- Cerodontha agraensis (Tandon, 1966)
- Cerodontha albineura Zlobin, 1993
- Cerodontha alishana Sasakawa, 2008
- Cerodontha alpestris Martinez, 1987
- Cerodontha alpina Nowakowski, 1967
- Cerodontha altaica Zlobin, 1993
- Cerodontha andensis Spencer, 1963
- Cerodontha angela Boucher, 2014
- Cerodontha angulata (Loew, 1869)
- Cerodontha angustipennis Harrison, 1959
- Cerodontha aristella (Spencer, 1961)
- Cerodontha aristosa Spencer, 1986
- Cerodontha atra (Meigen, 1830)
- Cerodontha atrata Zlobin, 1986
- Cerodontha atrissima Spencer, 1977
- Cerodontha atronitens (Hendel, 1920)
- Cerodontha attenuata Spencer, 1986
- Cerodontha augustensis Spencer, 1977
- Cerodontha bambusae Martinez, 1992
- Cerodontha beigerae Nowakowski, 1972
- Cerodontha bicolorata Spencer, 1969
- Cerodontha bimaculata (Meigen, 1830)
- Cerodontha biseta (Hendel, 1920)
- Cerodontha bisetiorbita (Sasakawa, 1955)
- Cerodontha bisetosa Zlobin, 1993
- Cerodontha bispinulosa Sasakawa, 1996
- Cerodontha bistrigata Frey, 1945
- Cerodontha bohemani (Rydén, 1951)
- Cerodontha braziliana Spencer, 1963
- Cerodontha brisiaca Nowakowski, 1972
- Cerodontha bulbiseta (Hendel, 1931)
- Cerodontha burmensis Zlobin, 2001
- Cerodontha butomomyzina Spencer, 1969
- Cerodontha calamagrostidis Nowakowski, 1967
- Cerodontha calosoma (Hendel, 1931)
- Cerodontha capitata (Zetterstedt, 1848)
- Cerodontha caricicola (Hering, 1926)
- Cerodontha cariciphaga (Spencer, 1963)
- Cerodontha caricivora (Groschke, 1954)
- Cerodontha caricivora Groschke, 1954
- Cerodontha carpathica Nowakowski, 1972
- Cerodontha caucasica Zlobin, 1979
- Cerodontha caudata Zlobin, 1986
- Cerodontha chaixiana (Hering, 1956)
- Cerodontha chilenica Spencer, 1982
- Cerodontha chilensis Spencer, 1982
- Cerodontha chillcottiella Spencer, 1986
- Cerodontha chonoterminalis Sasakawa, 2005
- Cerodontha churchillensis Spencer, 1969
- Cerodontha cingulata (Zetterstedt, 1848)
- Cerodontha colombiensis Spencer, 1984
- Cerodontha cornigera (Meijere, 1934)
- Cerodontha courtalamensis (Beri & Ipe, 1971)
- Cerodontha coxalis Martinez, 1987
- Cerodontha crassiseta (Strobl, 1900)
- Cerodontha cruciata (Blanchard, 1938)
- Cerodontha curta (Sasakawa, 1963)
- Cerodontha darjeelingensis Singh & Ipe, 1973
- Cerodontha delectabilis Spencer, 1977
- Cerodontha denticornis (Panzer, 1806)
- Cerodontha denticornis (Meigen, 1830)
- Cerodontha deserta Zlobin, 1993
- Cerodontha dorsalis (Loew, 1863)
- Cerodontha downhillensis Singh & Ipe, 1973
- Cerodontha duplicata (Spencer, 1961)
- Cerodontha ecaudata Sasakawa, 2005
- Cerodontha elbergi Nowakowski, 1972
- Cerodontha elevata Spencer, 1985
- Cerodontha eminula Sasakawa, 2005
- Cerodontha eriphori Nowakowski, 1972
- Cerodontha estlandica Zlobin, 1993
- Cerodontha eucaris Nowakowski, 1967
- Cerodontha falcata Cerný, 2016
- Cerodontha fasciata (Strobl, 1880)
- Cerodontha flavicornis (Egger, 1863)
- Cerodontha flavifrons (Philippi, 1866)
- Cerodontha flavifrons Zlobin, 1984
- Cerodontha flavipalpis Sasakawa, 1988
- Cerodontha flavocingulata (Strobl, 1909)
- Cerodontha flavohalterata Ipe, 1971
- Cerodontha floresensis (Spencer, 1961)
- Cerodontha frankensis Spencer, 1969
- Cerodontha frosti Spencer, 1973
- Cerodontha fujianensis Sasakawa, 1996
- Cerodontha fujianica Chen & Wang, 2003
- Cerodontha fulva Spencer, 1977
- Cerodontha fulvipes (Meigen, 1830)
- Cerodontha fulvithorax Malloch, 1934
- Cerodontha fumipennis Zlobin, 1993
- Cerodontha fuscifrons Spencer, 1969
- Cerodontha fusculata Spencer, 1986
- Cerodontha gallica Nowakowski, 1967
- Cerodontha geniculata (Fallén, 1823)
- Cerodontha gibbardi Spencer, 1969
- Cerodontha gibbifera Guglya, 2021
- Cerodontha gorodkovi Zlobin, 1979
- Cerodontha gracilis Spencer, 1969
- Cerodontha griffithsi Nowakowski, 1967
- Cerodontha griffonensis Boucher, 2012
- Cerodontha guineana Zlobin, 1993
- Cerodontha hakusana Sasakawa, 2005
- Cerodontha handlirschi Nowakowski, 1967
- Cerodontha hardyi (Sasakawa, 1963)
- Cerodontha hennigi Nowakowski, 1967
- Cerodontha heringiella Spencer, 1961
- Cerodontha hirsuta Sasakawa, 1972
- Cerodontha hirtae Nowakowski, 1967
- Cerodontha hirtipennis Sasakawa, 1977
- Cerodontha honshuensis Henshaw, 1989
- Cerodontha hreblensis Guglya, 2021
- Cerodontha hungarica Zlobin, 1980
- Cerodontha illinoensis (Malloch, 1934)
- Cerodontha imbuta (Meigen, 1838)
- Cerodontha impatientis Sasakawa, 1992
- Cerodontha impercepta Spencer, 1986
- Cerodontha impolita Spencer, 1986
- Cerodontha incisa (Meigen, 1830)
- Cerodontha inconspicua (Malloch, 1913)
- Cerodontha inepta Spencer, 1963
- Cerodontha inflata Boucher, 2002
- Cerodontha intermedia Garg, 1971
- Cerodontha ircos (Goureau, 1851)
- Cerodontha iridicola (Koizumi, 1953)
- Cerodontha iridophora Spencer, 1973
- Cerodontha islandica Griffiths, 1968
- Cerodontha israelica Cerný, 2011
- Cerodontha jacutica Zlobin, 1979
- Cerodontha javana (Meijere, 1934)
- Cerodontha kakamegae Spencer, 1985
- Cerodontha kalatopensis Singh & Garg, 1970
- Cerodontha kambaitiensis Zlobin, 2001
- Cerodontha kasparyani Zlobin, 1997
- Cerodontha kennethi Zlobin, 1997
- Cerodontha kenyana Zlobin, 2001
- Cerodontha kerteszi (Hendel, 1931)
- Cerodontha kerzhneri Zlobin, 1979
- Cerodontha kirae Sasakawa, 1962
- Cerodontha kivuensis (Spencer, 1959)
- Cerodontha labradorensis Spencer, 1969
- Cerodontha lacerata Zlobin, 1993
- Cerodontha laetifica Spencer, 1966
- Cerodontha lapplandica (Rydén, 1956)
- Cerodontha lateralis (Macquart, 1835)
- Cerodontha latifrons Spencer, 1986
- Cerodontha leptophallus Papp, 2016
- Cerodontha lindrothi Griffiths, 1964
- Cerodontha lineella (Zetterstedt, 1838)
- Cerodontha longimentula (Sasakawa, 1963)
- Cerodontha longipennis (Loew, 1869)
- Cerodontha luctuosa (Meigen, 1830)
- Cerodontha lunulata Sasakawa, 1992
- Cerodontha luzulae (Groschke, 1957)
- Cerodontha lyneborgi Spencer, 1972
- Cerodontha maclayi Spencer, 1981
- Cerodontha macminni Spencer, 1986
- Cerodontha macrophalloides Sasakawa, 1992
- Cerodontha magellani Spencer, 1982
- Cerodontha magna Spencer, 1973
- Cerodontha magnicornis (Loew, 1869)
- Cerodontha magnificans (Spencer, 1959)
- Cerodontha malaisei Spencer, 1981
- Cerodontha melicae Nowakowski, 1972
- Cerodontha mellita Spencer, 1971
- Cerodontha michaeli Zlobin, 2000
- Cerodontha milleri Spencer, 1973
- Cerodontha mixta Zlobin, 1984
- Cerodontha montanoides Spencer, 1981
- Cerodontha morosa (Meigen, 1830)
- Cerodontha morula (Hendel, 1920)
- Cerodontha muscina (Meigen, 1830)
- Cerodontha mussooriensis Garg, 1971
- Cerodontha myanmarensis Zlobin, 2001
- Cerodontha nartshukae Zlobin, 1984
- Cerodontha negrosensis (Sasakawa, 1963)
- Cerodontha nigra Spencer, 1984
- Cerodontha nigricoxa (Malloch, 1914)
- Cerodontha nigrihalterata Boucher, 2005
- Cerodontha nitidiventris (Malloch, 1934)
- Cerodontha notopleuralis Sasakawa, 1988
- Cerodontha nowakowskii Zlobin, 1984
- Cerodontha obliqua Zlobin, 1993
- Cerodontha obscurata Martinez, 1992
- Cerodontha occidentalis Sehgal, 1968
- Cerodontha occidoparva Boucher, 2002
- Cerodontha okazakii (Matsumura, 1916)
- Cerodontha omissa (Spencer, 1961)
- Cerodontha orbitalis Zlobin, 1984
- Cerodontha orbitona (Spencer, 1960)
- Cerodontha orcina Spencer, 1973
- Cerodontha oryziphila Zlobin, 1993
- Cerodontha oryzivora (Spencer, 1961)
- Cerodontha pallidiciliata Spencer, 1969
- Cerodontha paludosa Spencer, 1981
- Cerodontha palustris Nowakowski, 1972
- Cerodontha parvella Spencer, 1986
- Cerodontha patagonica Spencer, 1982
- Cerodontha pathanapuramensis Ipe, 1971
- Cerodontha pecki Spencer, 1973
- Cerodontha phalaridis Nowakowski, 1967
- Cerodontha phragmitidis Nowakowski, 1967
- Cerodontha phragmitophila Hering, 1935
- Cerodontha piliseta (Becker, 1903)
- Cerodontha pilosa Boucher, 2008
- Cerodontha poemyzina (Spencer, 1963)
- Cerodontha poolei Spencer, 1986
- Cerodontha pseuderrans (Hendel, 1931)
- Cerodontha pseudodorsalis Zlobin, 1979
- Cerodontha pseudopygmina Zlobin, 1986
- Cerodontha pubicata (Spencer, 1959)
- Cerodontha puertoricensis Spencer, 1973
- Cerodontha pusilla Zlobin, 1997
- Cerodontha pygmaea (Meigen, 1830)
- Cerodontha pygmella (Hendel, 1931)
- Cerodontha pygmina (Hendel, 1931)
- Cerodontha pygminoides Spencer, 1981
- Cerodontha quatei Sasakawa, 1996
- Cerodontha questa Spencer, 1981
- Cerodontha rhodendorfi Nowakowski, 1967
- Cerodontha rozkosnyi Cerný, 2007
- Cerodontha ruficornis Zlobin, 1986
- Cerodontha sasae (Sasakawa, 1961)
- Cerodontha sasakawai Zlobin, 1984
- Cerodontha scirpi (Karl, 1926)
- Cerodontha scirpioides Zlobin, 1997
- Cerodontha scleriae Martinez, 1992
- Cerodontha scripivora Spencer, 1969
- Cerodontha scutellaris (Roser, 1840)
- Cerodontha setariae (Spencer, 1959)
- Cerodontha setifrons (Hendel, 1931)
- Cerodontha sibirica Zlobin, 1979
- Cerodontha silvatica (Groschke, 1957)
- Cerodontha siwalikensis Singh & Garg, 1970
- Cerodontha spencerae Zlobin, 1993
- Cerodontha spinata (Groschke, 1954)
- Cerodontha spinipenis (Sasakawa, 1963)
- Cerodontha stackelbergi Nowakowski, 1972
- Cerodontha staryi (Starý, 1930)
- Cerodontha stuckenberigella Spencer, 1977
- Cerodontha subangulata (Malloch, 1916)
- Cerodontha sudzukhensis Zlobin, 1993
- Cerodontha suntarica Zlobin, 1993
- Cerodontha superciliosa (Zetterstedt, 1860)
- Cerodontha suputinka Zlobin, 1993
- Cerodontha suturalis (Hendel, 1931)
- Cerodontha sylvesterensis Spencer, 1976
- Cerodontha sympatria Zlobin, 1997
- Cerodontha taigensis Zlobin, 1986
- Cerodontha tanasijtshuki Zlobin, 1979
- Cerodontha temeculensis Spencer, 1981
- Cerodontha thompsoni (Frick, 1952)
- Cerodontha thulensis Griffiths, 1966
- Cerodontha thunebergi Nowakowski, 1967
- Cerodontha togashii Sasakawa, 2005
- Cerodontha toluca Boucher, 2002
- Cerodontha triplicata (Spencer, 1963)
- Cerodontha trispinata Spencer, 1977
- Cerodontha trispinella Spencer, 1977
- Cerodontha trispinosa Spencer, 1977
- Cerodontha ultima Spencer, 1969
- Cerodontha ungula Lonsdale, 2021
- Cerodontha unica Zlobin, 1993
- Cerodontha unisetiorbita Zlobin, 1993
- Cerodontha ussuriensis Zlobin, 1979
- Cerodontha vandalitiensis Spencer, 1966
- Cerodontha venturii Nowakowski, 1967
- Cerodontha versicolor Ipe, 1971
- Cerodontha vietnamensis (Sasakawa, 1963)
- Cerodontha vigneae Nowakowski, 1967
- Cerodontha vinokurovi Zlobin, 1993
- Cerodontha vittigera Malloch, 1927
- Cerodontha vladimiri Cerný, 2007
- Cerodontha vockerothi Boucher, 2012
- Cerodontha voluptabilis Spencer, 1977
- Cerodontha walarai (Singh & Ipe, 1970)
- Cerodontha woodi Boucher, 2012
- Cerodontha yukonensis Spencer, 1969
- Cerodontha zaitzeviana Zlobin, 1993
- Cerodontha zejana Zlobin, 1993
- Cerodontha zlobini Spencer, 1987
- Cerodontha zlobiniana Spencer, 1987
- Cerodontha zoerneri Nowakowski, 1972
- Cerodontha zuskai Nowakowski, 1972
