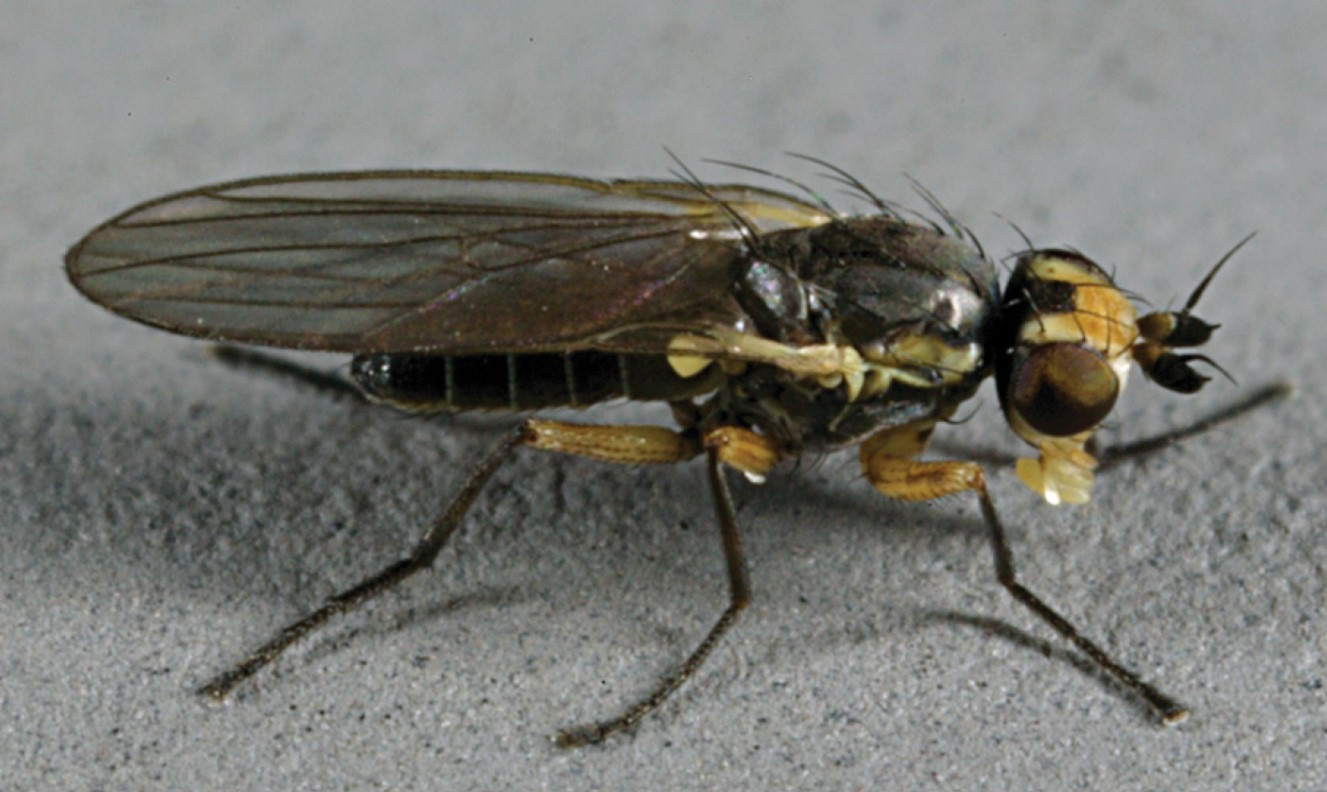
- Cerodontha dorsalis
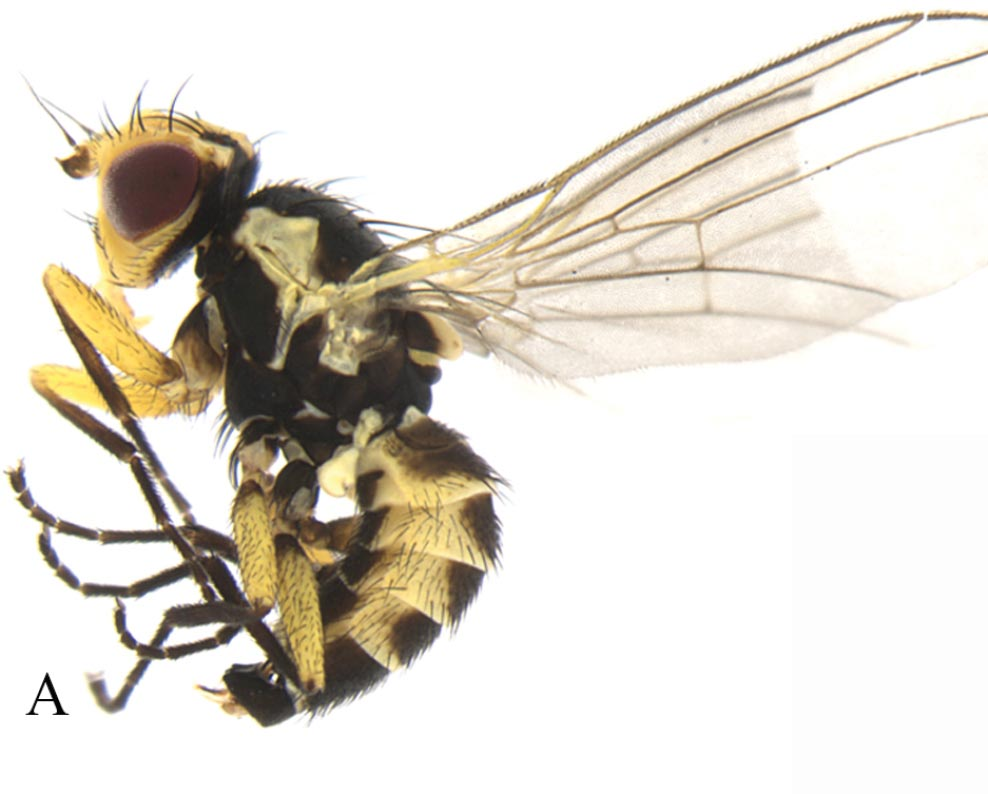
- A male Cerodontha flavicornis

Scientific classification
- Kingdom: Animalia
- Phylum: Arthropoda
- Clade: Pancrustacea
- Class: Insecta
- Order: Diptera
- Family: Agromyzidae
- Subfamily: Phytomyzinae
- Genus: Cerodontha; Rondani, 1861

Type species
- Chlorops denticornis Panzer, 1806

Diversity
- at least 280 species

Synonyms
- Ceratomyza Schiner, 1862; Cerodonta Hering, 1926; Odonthocera Rondani, 1861

= Cerodontha =

Genus of flies

Cerodontha is a genus of flies that belongs to the family Agromyzidae. Members of this genus are distributed worldwide.

This genus are leaf miners feeding almost exclusively on monocotyledons, specifically of the families Cyperaceae, Iridaceae, Juncaceae and Poaceae.

== Taxonomy ==
This genus is a very large genus that contains at least 280 species. They are currently divided into seven recognized subgenera which are: Cerodontha, Butomomyza, Dizygomyza, Icteromyza, Phytagromyza, Poemyza and Xenophytomyza.

Below is a list of species within this genus that has a Wikipedia page. For a full list of all 280+ species, see this page:

- Cerodontha angulata (Loew, 1869)
- Cerodontha denticornis (Panzer, 1806)
- Cerodontha dorsalis (Loew, 1863)
- Cerodontha fulvipes (Meigen, 1830)
- Cerodontha incisa (Meigen, 1830)
- Cerodontha ircos (Goureau, 1851)
- Cerodontha scirpi (Karl, 1926)
- Cerodontha scutellaris (Roser, 1840)

== Distribution ==
Species belonging to this genus can be found worldwide. In the neotropics, all subgenera except Phytagromyza are present totaling 37 species. Brazil contains only five species: Cerodontha angulata, Cerodontha dorsalis, Cerodontha inepta, Cerodontha braziliana and Cerodontha longipennis. All seven subgenera are present in the Palaearctic (~140 species) and Nearctic regions. Five subgenera, Butomomyza, Cerodontha, Dizygomyza, Icteromyza and Poemyza, are present in the Oriental (indomalayan) (49 species), Afrotropical, Australasian, and Oceanian regions. China contains 25 species.
