= Cerodontha scirpi =

Scientific classification
- Kingdom: Animalia
- Phylum: Arthropoda
- Class: Insecta
- Order: Diptera
- Family: Agromyzidae
- Subfamily: Phytomyzinae
- Genus: Cerodontha
- Species: C. scirpi

Binomial name
- Cerodontha scirpi (Karl, 1926)

Synonyms
- Dizygomyza scirpi Karl, 1926

Species of fly

Cerodontha scirpi is a species of fly in the family Agromyzidae.

== Distribution ==
United States, Canada.
