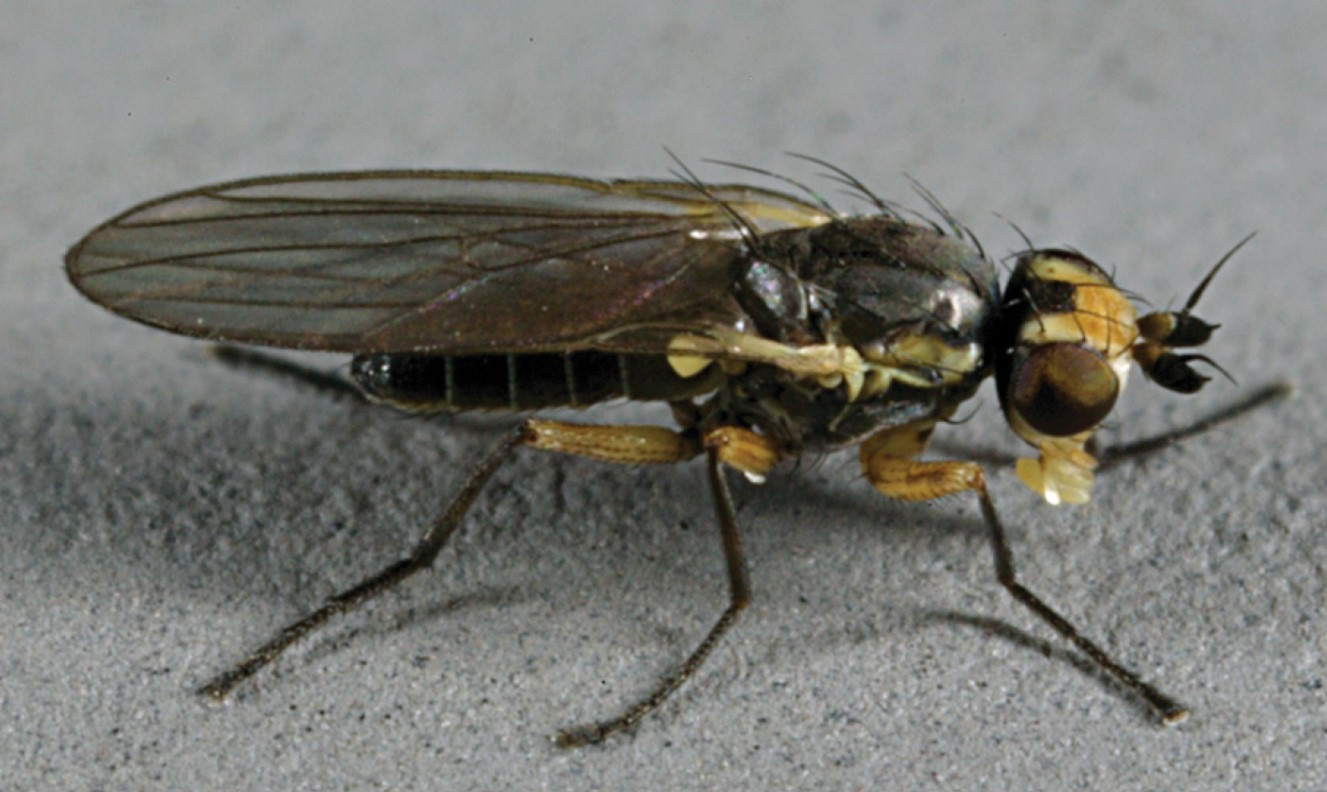

Scientific classification
- Kingdom: Animalia
- Phylum: Arthropoda
- Class: Insecta
- Order: Diptera
- Family: Agromyzidae
- Subfamily: Phytomyzinae
- Genus: Cerodontha
- Species: C. dorsalis

Binomial name
- Cerodontha dorsalis (Loew, 1863)

= Cerodontha dorsalis =

Species of fly

Cerodontha dorsalis, the grass sheathminer, is a species of fly in the family Agromyzidae.

== Distribution ==
Canada, United States, Mongolia, Neotropical.
