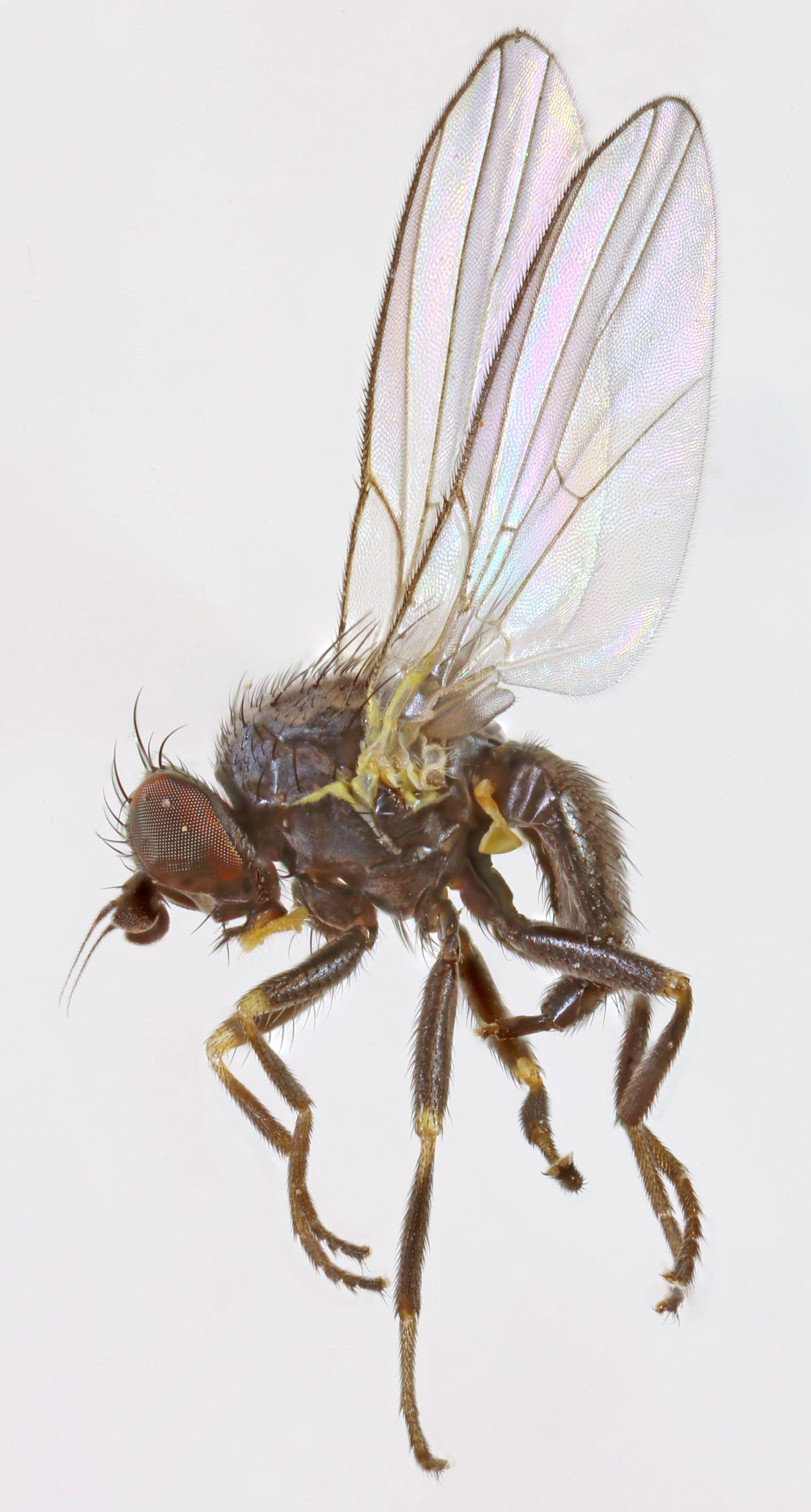
- Image of female Cerodontha iraeos

Scientific classification
- Kingdom: Animalia
- Phylum: Arthropoda
- Class: Insecta
- Order: Diptera
- Family: Agromyzidae
- Genus: Cerodontha
- Species: C. ircos

Binomial name
- Cerodontha ircos (Goureau, 1851)

Synonyms
- Agromyza iraeos Robineau-Desvoidy, 1851; Agromyza ircos Goureau, 1851; Agromyza ireos Goureau, 1851; Cerodontha iraeos (Robineau-Desvoidy, 1851); Cerodontha ireos (Robineau-Desvoidy, 1851); Phytobia iraeos (Robineau-devoidy, 1851)

= Cerodontha ircos =

Species of fly

Cerodontha ircos is a species of fly in the family Agromyzidae. Its larvae form leaf mines on species in the genus Iris. Initially several eggs are deposited inside the leaf, and the larvae form long corridor mines which merge to create the impression of a large blotch. Pupation occurs inside the mine.
