= Cerodontha scutellaris =

Scientific classification
- Kingdom: Animalia
- Phylum: Arthropoda
- Class: Insecta
- Order: Diptera
- Family: Agromyzidae
- Subfamily: Phytomyzinae
- Genus: Cerodontha
- Species: C. scutellaris

Binomial name
- Cerodontha scutellaris (Roser, 1840)

Species of fly

Cerodontha scutellaris is a species of fly in the family Agromyzidae.

== Distribution ==
Europe.
