= Cerodontha fulvipes =

Scientific classification
- Kingdom: Animalia
- Phylum: Arthropoda
- Class: Insecta
- Order: Diptera
- Family: Agromyzidae
- Subfamily: Phytomyzinae
- Genus: Cerodontha
- Species: C. fulvipes

Binomial name
- Cerodontha fulvipes (Meigen, 1830)

Synonyms
- Agromyza fulvipes Meigen, 1830

Species of fly

Cerodontha fulvipes is a species of fly in the family Agromyzidae.

== Distribution ==
Russia.
