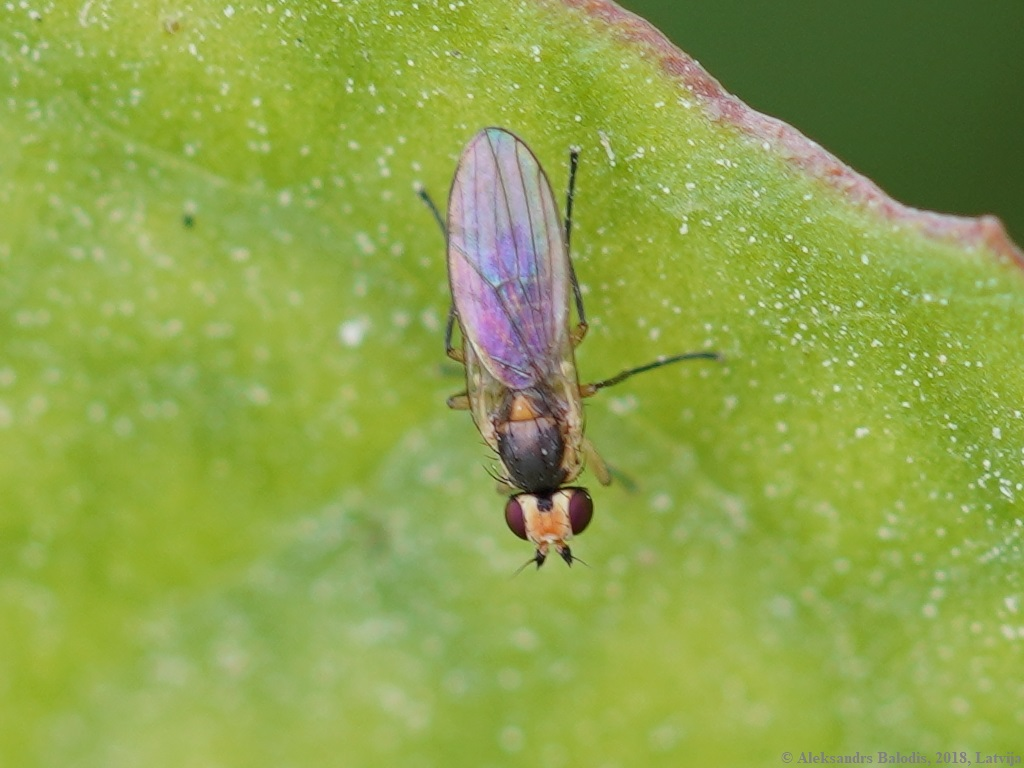
- Cerodontha denticornis

Scientific classification
- Kingdom: Animalia
- Phylum: Arthropoda
- Class: Insecta
- Order: Diptera
- Family: Agromyzidae
- Subfamily: Phytomyzinae
- Genus: Cerodontha
- Species: C. denticornis

Binomial name
- Cerodontha denticornis (Panzer, 1806)

Synonyms
- Chlorops denticornis Panzer, 1806; Agromyza nigritarsis Meigen, 1830

= Cerodontha denticornis =

Species of fly

Cerodontha denticornis is a species of fly in the family Agromyzidae.

== Distribution ==
Taiwan, India, Afghanistan, Africa, Europe, Japan.
