= Cerodontha angulata =

Scientific classification
- Kingdom: Animalia
- Phylum: Arthropoda
- Clade: Pancrustacea
- Class: Insecta
- Order: Diptera
- Family: Agromyzidae
- Subfamily: Phytomyzinae
- Genus: Cerodontha
- Species: C. angulata

Binomial name
- Cerodontha angulata (Loew, 1869)

Synonyms
- Agromyza angulata Loew, 1869; Agromyza cinereifrons Frost, 1931; Agromyza neptis Loew, 1869

Species of fly

Cerodontha angulata is a species of fly that belongs to the family Agromyzidae.

== Distribution ==
United States, Canada, Guyana, Brazil, Europe.
