= List of Casearia species =

Casearia is a widespread genus that occurs on a subcosmopolitain scale, with roughly 252 accepted species across the world.

== List ==
The following species of Casearia are accepted by Plants of the World Online as of April 2025: (Note: Some names may be recognized or otherwise considered synonyms by Plants of the World Online, but not by others, like with Casearia elegans or Euceraea nitida.) (Note: This list will not be accurate forever due to the constant changes of taxonomy in the genus.)

=== A ===
- Casearia aculeata Jacq.
- Casearia acuminata DC.
- Casearia adiantoides Sleumer
- Casearia albicans Wall. ex C.B.Clarke
- Casearia altiplanensis Sleumer
- Casearia americana (L.) T.Samar. & M.H.Alford
- Casearia amplectens Sleumer
- Casearia amplissima Tul.
- Casearia andamanica King
- Casearia angiensis Sleumer
- Casearia angustifolia A.C.Sm.
- Casearia angustifructa A.X.Wang & Appleq.
- Casearia anisophylla Gilg
- Casearia annamensis (Gagnep.) Lescot & Sleumer
- Casearia anosyensis Appleq. & M.T.Gates
- Casearia apodantha (Kuhlm.) de Mestier, Celis & Borsch
- Casearia aquifolia C.Wright
- Casearia arborea (Rich.) Urb.
- Casearia archboldiana Sleumer
- Casearia arfakensis Sleumer
- Casearia arguta Kunth
- Casearia astyla Turcz.
- Casearia atlantica Sleumer
- Casearia auriculata Sleumer
- Casearia austroafricana A.E.van Wyk, R.G.C.Boon & Retief

=== B ===
- Casearia bahiensis Sleumer
- Casearia barteri Mast.
- Casearia bartlettii Lundell
- Casearia battiscombei R.E.Fr.
- Casearia bicolor Urb.
- Casearia bissei J.E.Gut.
- Casearia bourdillonii Mukh.
- Casearia brassii Sleumer
- Casearia brideliifolia Sleumer
- Casearia brunneostriata Gilg
- Casearia buelowii Whistler

=== C ===
- Casearia cajambrensis Cuatrec.
- Casearia calva Craib
- Casearia capitellata Blume
- Casearia carrii Sleumer
- Casearia catharinensis Sleumer
- Casearia cauliflora Volkens
- Casearia chocoensis (A.H.Gentry & Forero) de Mestier, Celis & Borsch
- Casearia clarkei King
- Casearia clutiifolia Blume
- Casearia combaymensis Tul.
- Casearia comocladiifolia Vent.
- Casearia completa (Jacq.) T.Samar. & M.H.Alford
- Casearia condorensis Pierre ex Gagnep.
- Casearia congensis Gilg
- Casearia coriacea Vent.
- Casearia coriifolia Lescot & Sleumer
- Casearia coronata Standl. & L.O.Williams
- Casearia corymbosa Kunth
- Casearia corymbulosa (Spruce ex Benth.) T.Samar. & M.H.Alford
- Casearia costulata Jessup
- Casearia cotticensis Uittien
- Casearia crassinervis Urb.
- Casearia crassipes A.C.Sm.
- Casearia cuspidata Blume

=== D ===
- Casearia dallachyi F.Muell.
- Casearia decandra Jacq.
- Casearia deplanchei Sleumer
- Casearia dinklagei Gilg
- Casearia dodecandra (Jacq.) T.Samar. & M.H.Alford
- Casearia dolichanthera T.Samar. & M.H.Alford
- Casearia draganae M.H.Alford
- Casearia duckeana Sleumer

=== E ===
- Casearia eichleriana Sleumer
- Casearia elegans Standl.
- Casearia elliptifolia Merr.
- Casearia emarginata C.Wright ex Griseb.
- Casearia engleri Gilg
- Casearia erythrocarpa Sleumer
- Casearia espiritosantensis R.Marquete & Mansano
- Casearia euceraea de Mestier, Celis & Borsch
- Casearia euphlebia Merr.

=== F ===
- Casearia fasciculata (Ruiz & Pav.) Sleumer
- Casearia fissistipula A.C.Sm.
- Casearia flavovirens Blume
- Casearia flexicaulis K.Schum.
- Casearia flexula Ridl.
- Casearia flexuosa Craib
- Casearia fuliginosa (Blanco) Blanco

=== G ===
- Casearia gallifera Tathana
- Casearia gambiana Breteler
- Casearia gigantifolia Slooten
- Casearia glabra Roxb.
- Casearia gladiiformis Mast.
- Casearia globifera Gilg
- Casearia glomerata Roxb.
- Casearia gossypiosperma Briq.
- Casearia grandiflora Cambess.
- Casearia graveolens Dalzell
- Casearia grayi Jessup
- Casearia grewiifolia Vent.
- Casearia guevarana Cast.-Campos & M.E.Medina
- Casearia guianensis (Aubl.) Urb.

=== H ===
- Casearia halmaherensis Slooten
- Casearia harmandiana Pierre ex Gagnep.
- Casearia hirsuta Sw.
- Casearia hirtella Hosok.
- Casearia hosei Merr.

=== I ===
- Casearia ilicifolia (Sw.) Vent.
- Casearia impressinervia Merr.
- Casearia impunctata Hook. & Arn.
- Casearia inaequalis Hutch. & Dalziel
- Casearia isthmica de Mestier & O.Ortiz
- Casearia itzana Lundell

=== K ===
- Casearia kaalaensis Lescot & Sleumer
- Casearia kigeri T.Samar. & M.H.Alford
- Casearia killipii (Monach.) de Mestier, Celis & Borsch
- Casearia kostermansii Sleumer
- Casearia kurzii C.B.Clarke

=== L ===
- Casearia laetioides (A.Rich.) Warb.
- Casearia lasiophylla Eichler
- Casearia ledermannii Gilg
- Casearia lifuana Däniker
- Casearia lobbiana Turcz.
- Casearia loheri Merr.
- Casearia longifolia A.C.Sm.
- Casearia lopeziana Sleumer
- Casearia luetzelburgii Sleumer
- Casearia lunana (P.Wilson) Greuter & R.Rankin

=== M ===
- Casearia macrantha Gilg
- Casearia macrocarpa C.B.Clarke
- Casearia manausensis Sleumer
- Casearia mannii Mast.
- Casearia mariquitensis Kunth
- Casearia marquetei Nepom. & M.Alves
- Casearia mauritiana Bosser
- Casearia maynacarpa Liesner & P.Jørg.
- Casearia megacarpa Cuatrec.
- Casearia megalophylla Gilg
- Casearia melliodora Eichler
- Casearia membranacea Hance
- Casearia mestrensis Sleumer
- Casearia mexiae Sandwith
- Casearia mexicana (Rose) T.Samar. & M.H.Alford
- Casearia michelsonii Breteler
- Casearia microcarpa Sleumer
- Casearia mindanaensis Merr.
- Casearia minutiflora Ridl.
- Casearia moaensis Vict.
- Casearia mollis Kunth
- Casearia monticola Sleumer
- Casearia montigena Appleq. & M.T.Gates
- Casearia multinervosa C.T.White & Sleumer
- Casearia murceana R.Marquete & Mansano
- Casearia myrsinoides Sleumer

=== N ===
- Casearia neblinae Sleumer
- Casearia negrensis Eichler
- Casearia nigrescens Tul.
- Casearia nigricans Sleumer
- Casearia nigricolor Sleumer
- Casearia nitida (L.) Jacq.
- Casearia novoguineensis Valeton

=== O ===
- Casearia obliqua Spreng.
- Casearia oblongifolia Cambess.
- Casearia obovalis Poepp. ex Griseb.
- Casearia olivacea Sleumer
- Casearia onivensis A.X.Wang & Philpott
- Casearia ophiticola Vict.
- Casearia oreogenes Sleumer

=== P ===
- Casearia pachyphylla Gilg
- Casearia panamensis T.Samar. & M.H.Alford
- Casearia papuana Sleumer
- Casearia paranaensis Sleumer
- Casearia parhamii A.C.Sm.
- Casearia parvistipula Tathana
- Casearia pauciflora Cambess.
- Casearia petelotii Merr.
- Casearia phanerophlebia Merr.
- Casearia philippinensis Merr.
- Casearia pitumba Sleumer
- Casearia povedae (N.Zamora, Aguilar & D.Santam.) T.Samar. & M.H.Alford
- Casearia praecox Griseb.
- Casearia prismatocarpa Mast.
- Casearia procera A.C.Sm.
- Casearia prunifolia Kunth
- Casearia pseudoglomerata Sleumer
- Casearia pseudophiticola J.E.Gut.
- Casearia puberula Guillaumin
- Casearia pubipes A.C.Sm.

=== Q ===
- Casearia quinduensis Tul.

=== R ===
- Casearia ramosissima C.Wright ex Griseb.
- Casearia razakamalalae Philpott & Appleq.
- Casearia resinifera Spruce ex Eichler
- Casearia rheophytica (P.E.Berry & M.E.Olson) de Mestier, Celis & Borsch
- Casearia rhynchophylla Gilg
- Casearia richii A.Gray
- Casearia rinorcoides Sleumer
- Casearia ripicola Sleumer
- Casearia rovumensis I.Darbysh. & J.E.Burrows
- Casearia rubescens Dalzell
- Casearia rufescens Cambess.
- Casearia rugulosa Blume
- Casearia runssorica Gilg
- Casearia rupestris Eichler
- Casearia rusbyana Briq.

=== S ===
- Casearia samoensis Whistler
- Casearia sanchezii J.Linares & Angulo
- Casearia schlechteri Gilg
- Casearia seethalakshmiae V.Suresh & Ambika
- Casearia selloa Eichler
- Casearia septandra Breteler & A.Baldé
- Casearia sessiliflora Cambess.
- Casearia silvana Schltr.
- Casearia singularis Eichler
- Casearia sleumeriana (Steyerm. & Maguire) de Mestier, Celis & Borsch
- Casearia souzae R.Marquete & Mansano
- Casearia spinescens (Sw.) Griseb.
- Casearia spinulosa (Vent.) T.Samar. & M.H.Alford
- Casearia staffordiae Proctor
- Casearia standleyana Sleumer
- Casearia stapfiana Ridl.
- Casearia stenophylla A.C.Sm.
- Casearia stipitata Mast.
- Casearia stjohnii I.M.Johnst.
- Casearia suaveolens (Poepp.) T.Samar. & M.H.Alford
- Casearia subtrinervia A.X.Wang & Appleq.
- Casearia sylvestris Sw.

=== T ===
- Casearia tacanensis Lundell
- Casearia tachirensis Steyerm.
- Casearia tardieuae Lescot & Sleumer
- Casearia tenuipilosa Sleumer
- Casearia ternstroemioides (Griseb.) T.Samar. & M.H.Alford
- Casearia thamnia (L.) T.Samar. & M.H.Alford
- Casearia thwaitesii Briq.
- Casearia tinifolia Vent.
- Casearia tomentosa Roxb.
- Casearia tremula (Griseb.) Griseb. ex C.Wright
- Casearia trivalvis (Blanco) Merr.
- Casearia tuberculata Blume
- Casearia tulasneana (Baill.) Warb.

=== U ===
- Casearia uleana Sleumer
- Casearia ulmifolia Vahl ex Vent.
- Casearia urophylla Gilg

=== V ===
- Casearia valenciana R.Marquete & R.B.Torres
- Casearia vareca Roxb.
- Casearia velutina Blume
- Casearia velutinosa Ridl.
- Casearia villilimba Merr.
- Casearia villosa (Sw.) T.Samar. & M.H.Alford
- Casearia virescens Pierre ex Gagnep.

=== W ===
- Casearia williamsiana Sleumer
- Casearia wynadensis Bedd.

=== Y ===
- Casearia yatesii Sleumer
- Casearia yucatanensis (Standl.) T.Samar. & M.H.Alford

=== Z ===
- Casearia zahlbruckneri Szyszył.
- Casearia zeylanica (Gaertn.) Thwaites
- Casearia zizyphoides Kunth
