= Flora of Madhya Pradesh =

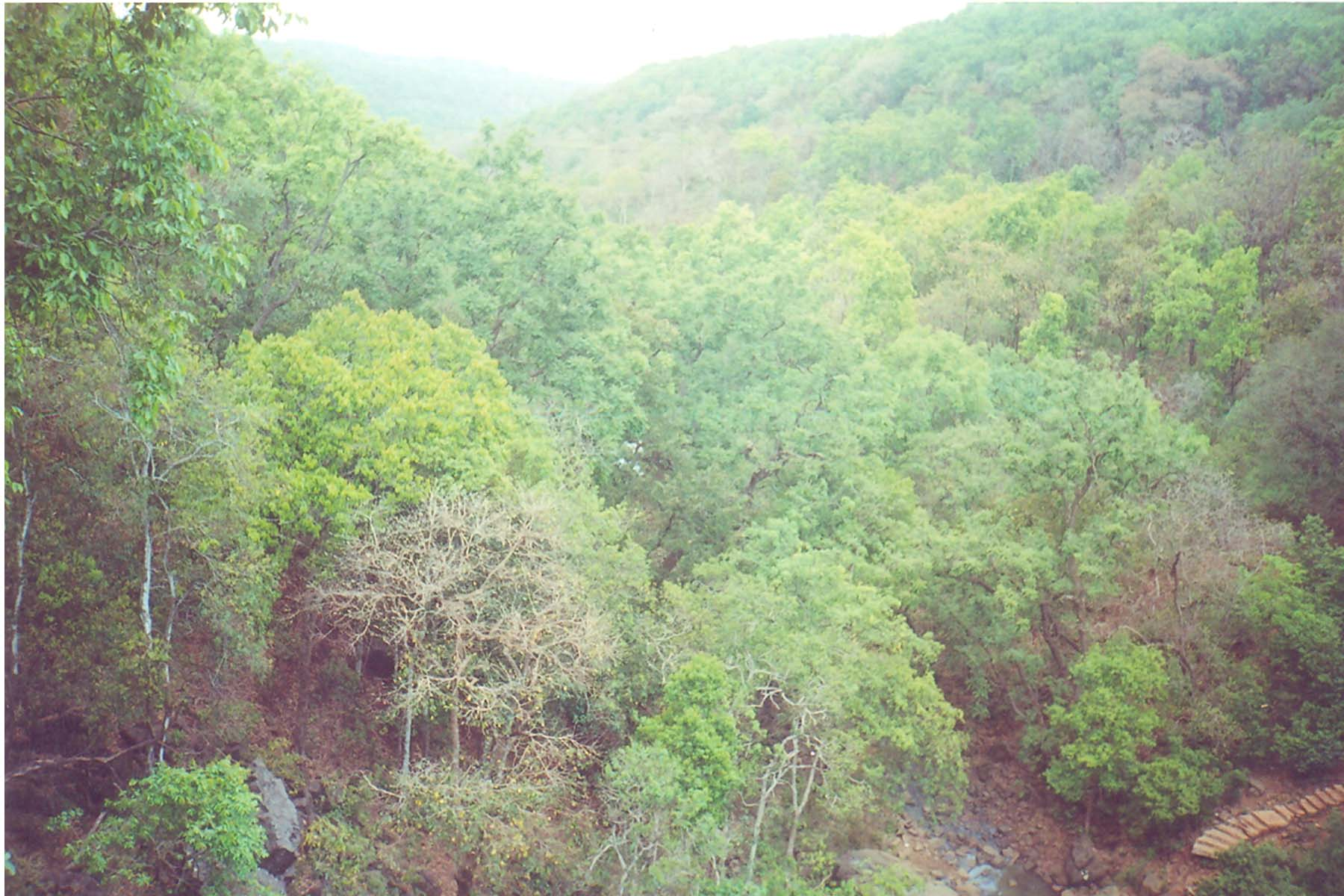
View of mixed forests at Amarkantak in Madhya Pradesh

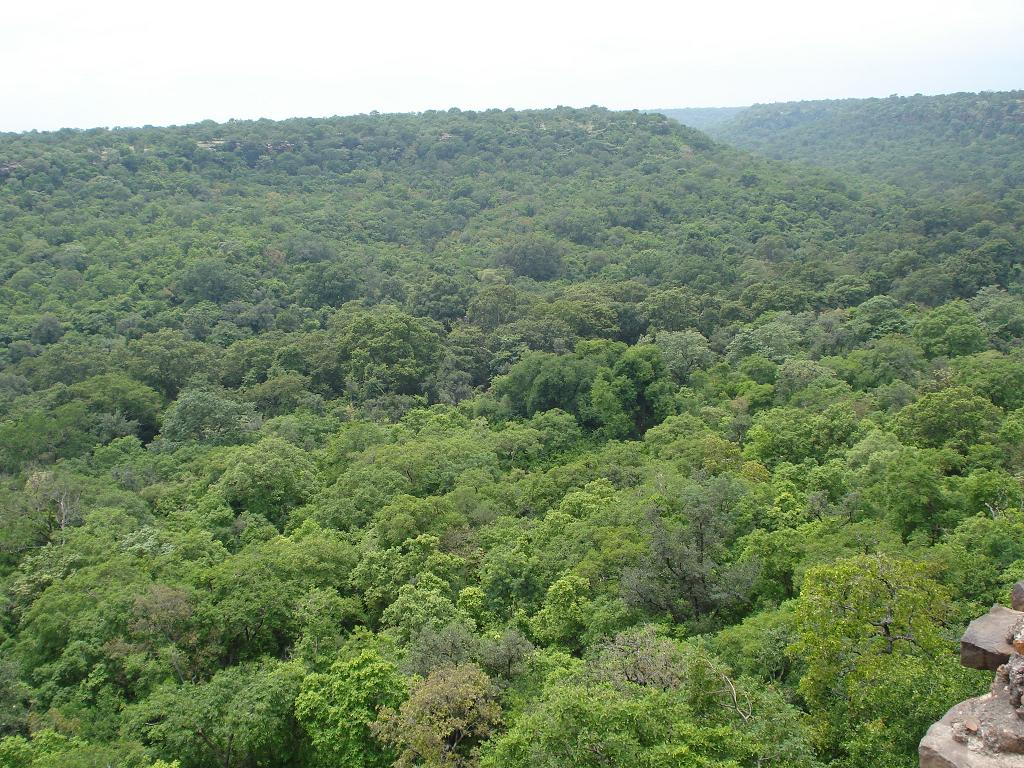
View of mixed forests around Hinglajgarh in Madhya Pradesh

The flora of Madhya Pradesh province in India, is very rich and diverse. Central, eastern and southern parts of the state are forested, whereas northern and western parts are deficient in forest. Variability in climatic and edaphic conditions brings about significant difference in the forest types and flora of the state. There are four important forest types: tropical moist, tropical dry, tropical thorn, and subtropical broadleaved hill forests. Based on composition, there are three important forest formations namely teak forest, sal forest and miscellaneous Forests. Bamboo bearing areas are widely distributed in the state. Following is the list of trees and plants found in Madhya Pradesh:

== large trees ==
S. No.	Botanical name	Local name (Devanagari)	Family	Photo
1.	Acacia arabica, Willd.	Babul (बबूल)	Leguminosae	
2.	Acacia catechu, Willd.	Khair (खैर)	Leguminosae	
3.	Acacia ferruginea, Dc.	Safed Khair (सफ़ेद खैर)	Leguminosae	
4.	Acacia leucophloea, Willd.	Reunja (रेउन्जा)	Leguminosae	
5.	Adina cordifolia, Hook. f.	Haldu (हल्दू)	Rubiaceae	
6.	Aegle marmelos, Correa.	Bel (बेल)	Rutaceae	
7.	Ailanthus excelsa, Roxb.	Maharukh (महारुख)	Simarubaceae	
8.	Albizzia lebbek, Benth.	Kala-siris (काला-सिरिस)	Leguminosae	
9.	Albizzia odoratissima, Benth.	Chichwa (चिचवा)	Leguminosae	
10.	Albizzia procera, Benth.	Safed-siris (सफ़ेद-सिरिस)	Leguminosae	
11.	Anogeissus latifolia, Wall.	Dhaora (धावड़ा)	Combretaceae	
12.	Anogeissus pendula, Edgew,	Kardhai (करधई)	Combretaceae	
13.	Azadirachta indica, A. Juss.	Neem (नीम)	Meliaceae	
14.	Bassia latifolia, Roxb.	Mahua (महुआ)	Sapotaceae	
15.	Bombax malabaricum, DC.	Semal (सेमल)	Malvaceae	
16.	Boswellia serrata, Roxb.	Salai (सलई)	Burseraceae	
17.	Bridelia retusa, Spreng.	Kasai (कसई)	Euphorbiaceae	
18.	Butea monosperma, (Lam.) Taub.	Palas (पलास)	Leguminosae	
19.	Careya arborea, Roxb.	Kumbhi (कुंभी)	Myrtaceae	
20.	Cedrela toona, Roxb.	Toon (तून)	Meliaceae	
21.	Chloroxylon swietenia, D.C.	Bhirra (भिर्रा)	Meliaceae	
22.	Cleistanthus collinus, Benth.	Garari (गरारी)	Euphorbiaceae	Garari at fruiting
23.	Cordia myxa, Linn.	Lasora (लसोडा)	Boraginaceae	
24.	Dalbergia latifolia, Roxb.	Shisham (शीशम)	Leguminosae	
25.	Dalbergia paniculata, Roxb.	Dhobin (धोबिन)	Leguminosae	
26.	Dalbergia sissoo, Roxb.	Sissoo (सिस्सू)	Leguminosae	
27.	Dillenia pentagyna, Roxb.	Kalla (कल्ला)	Dilleniaceae	
28.	Diospyros melanoxylon, Roxb.	Tendu (तेंदू)	Ebenaceae	
29.	Diospyros montana, Roxb.	Bistendu (बिसतेंदु)	Ebenaceae	
30.	Diospyros cordifolia, Roxb.	Bhaktendu (भाकतेंदू)	Ebenaceae	
31.	Erythrina suberosa, Roxb.	Pangra (पांगरा)	Leguminosae	
32.	Eugenia jambolana, Lamk.	Jamun (जामुन)	Myrtaceae	
33.	Feronia elephantum, Correa.	Kaith (कैथ)	Rutaceae	
34.	Ficus bengalensis, Linn.	Bar (बड)	Moraceae	
35.	Ficus glomerata, Roxb.	Gular (गुलर)	Moraceae	
36.	Ficus infectoria, Roxb.	Pakar (पाकर)	Moraceae	
37.	Ficus religiosa, Linn.	Pipal (पीपल)	Moraceae	
38.	Garuga pinnata, Roxb.	Kekad (केकड़)	Burseraceae	
39.	Gmelina arborea, Roxb.	Gamari (गमारी)	Verbenaceae	
40.	Grewia tiliaefolia, VahI.	Dhaman (धामन)	Tiliaceae	
41.	Hardwickia binata, Roxb.	Anjan (अंजन)	Leguminosae	
42.	Holoptelea integrifolia, Planch.	Chirol (चिरोल)	Ulmaceae	
43.	Hymenodictyon excelsum, Wall.	Bhonrsal (भोंरसाल)	Rubiaceae	
44.	Kydia calycina, Roxb.	Pula (पूला)	Malvaceae	
45.	Lagerstroemia parviflora, Roxb.	Seja (सेजा)	Lythraceae	
46.	Mangifera indica, Linn.	Am (आम)	Anacardiaceae	
47.	Miliusa velutina, Hook. f. &	(डोमसाल)	Annonaceae	
48.	Odina wodier, Roxb.	Jhingan (झिंगन)	Anacardiaceae	
49.	Ougeinia dalbcrgioides, Benth.	Tinsa (तिनसा)	Leguminosae	
50.	Phyllanthus emblica, Linn.	Aonla ( आंवला)	Euphorbiaceae	
51.	Pongamia. Venl.	Karanj (करंज)	Leguminosae	
52.	Prosopis cineraria, Linn.	Chenkur (चेंकुर)	Leguminosae	
53.	Prosopis juliflora, DC,	Khejra (खेजड़ा)	Leguminosae	
54.	Pterocarpus marsupium, Roxb.	Bijasal (बीजासाल)	Leguminosae	
55.	Saccopetalum tomentosum, H F. & Thoms.	Kari (कारी)	Annonaceae	
56.	Santalum album, Linn.	Chandan (चन्दन)	Santalaceae	
57.	Sapilldus laurifolius, VahI.	Ritha (रीठा)	Sapindaceae	
58.	Schleichera trijuga, WiIld.	Kusum (कुसुम)	Sapindaceae	
59.	Schrebera swietenioides, Roxb.	Mokha (मोखा)	Oleaceae	
60.	Shorea robusta, Gaertn.	Sal (साल)	Dipterocarpaceae	
61.	Soymida febrifuga, A. Juss.	Rohan (रोहण)	Meliaceae	
62.	Spondias mangifera, Willd.	Amra (आमरा)	Anacardiaceae	
63.	Stephegyne parvifolia, Korth.	Kaim (कैम)	Rubiaceae	
64.	Sterculia urens, Roxb.	Kulu (कुलू)	Sterculiaceae	
65.	Stereospermum chelenoides, DC	Padari (पाडरी)	Bignoniaceae	
66.	Stereospermum suaveolens, DC.	Padar (पाडर)	Bignoniaceae	padarii
67.	Stereospermum xylocarpum, Benth Wight.	Son-Padar (सोन-पाडर)	Bignoniaceae	
68.	Tamarindus indica, Linn.	Imli (इमली)	Leguminosae	
69.	Tectona grandis, Linn.	Sagon (सागोन)	Verbenaceae	
70.	Terminalia arjuna, Bedd.	Arjun (अर्जुन)	Combretaceae	
71.	Terminalia belerica, Roxb.	Bahera (बहेड़ा)	Combretaceae	
72.	Terminalia chebula, Retz.	Harra (हर्रा)	Combretaceae	
73.	Terminalia tomentosa, W&A.	Saj (साज)	Combretaceae	

== Small trees ==
S. No.	Botanical name	Local name (devanagari)	Family	Photo
74.	Balanites roxburghii, Plan.	Hingot (हिंगोट)	Zygophyuaceae	
75.	Bauhinia malabarica, Roxb.	Amta (आमटा)	Leguminosae	
76.	Bauhinia purpurea, Linn.	Keolar (केवलार)	Leguminosae	
77.	Bauhinia racemosa, Lamk.	Asta (आष्टा)	Leguminosae	
78.	Bauhinia retusa, Roxb.	Sehra (सेहरा)	Leguminosae	
79.	Bauhinia variegata, Linn.	Kachnar (कचनार)	Leguminosae	
80.	Buchanania latifolia, Roxh.	Achar (अचार)	Anacardiaceae	
81.	Casearia graveolens, Dalz.	Gilchi (गिलची)	Samydaceae	
82.	Casearia tomentosa, Roxh.	Tondri (टोंडरी)	Samydaceae	
83.	Cassia fistula, Linn.	Amaltas (अमलतास)	Leguminosae	
84.	Cochlospermum gossypium, DC.	Galgal (गलगल)	Bixaceae	
85.	Crateava religiosa, Forst.	Barna (बरना)	Capparidaceae	
86.	Dichrostachys cinerea, W. & A.	Velati (वेलाटी)	Leguminosae	
87.	Dolichandrone falkata, Seem.	Medhsingh (मेढ़सिंघ)		Bignoniaceae
88.	Elaeodendron glancnnl. Pers.	Jamrasi (जमरासी)	Celastraceae	
89.	Ehretia laevis, Roxb.	Datranga (दतरंगा)	Boraginaceae	
90.	Euphorbia nivulia, Ham.	Sehund (सेहुंड)	Euphorbiaceae	
91.	Euphorbia tiruculli, Linn.	Niwarang (निवरंग)	Euphorbiaceae	
92.	Flacourtia indica, (Burm.f.) Merr.	Kakai (ककई)	Salicaceae	
93.	Gardenia latifolia, Ait.	Papra (पापडा)	Rubiaceae	
94.	Gardenia lucida, Ruxb.	Dikamali (डिकामाली)	Rubiaceae	
95.	Gardenia turgida, Roxb.	Phetra (फेटरा)	Rubiaceae	
96.	Ixora parviflora, Vahl.	Lokhandi (लोखंडी)	Rubiaceae	
97.	Limonia acidissima, Linn.	Bilsena (बिलसेना)	Rutaceae	
98.	Litsaea sebifera, Pers.	Maidalakri (मैदालकड़ी)	Lauraceae	
99.	Mallotus philippinensis, Muell.	Roli (रोली)	Euphorbiaceae	
100.	Mimusops hexandra, (Roxb.),	Khirni (खिरनी)	Sapotaceae	
101.	Morinda tinctoria, Roxb.	Aal (आल)	Rubiaceae	
102.	Murraya exotica, Linn.	Madhukamini (मधुकामिनी)	Rutaceae	
103.	Murraya koenigii, Spreg.	Mithinim (मीठीनीम)	Rutaceae	
104.	Randia dumetorum, Lamk.	Mainphal (मैनफल)	Rubiaceae	
105.	Randia uliginosa, DC.	Katul (काटुल)	Rubiaceae	
105A.	Salvadora oleoides, Dcne.	Pilu (पिलू)	Salvadoraceae	
106.	Semecarpus anacardium, Linn.	Bhilma (भिलमा)	Anacardiaceae	
107.	Streblus asper. Linn.	Majni (मजनी)	Moraceae	
108.	Strychnos potatorum, Linn.	Nirmali (निर्मली)	Loganiaceae	
109.	Vitex peduncularis, Wall.	Morpai (मोरपाई)	Verbenaceae	
110.	Wendlandia exserta, DC.	Tilwan (तिलवन)	Rubiaceae	
111.	Wrightia tinctoria, R. Br.	Dudhi (दुधी)	Apocynaceae	
112.	Wrightia tomentosa, R & S.	Kalidudhi (कालीदुधी)	Apocynaceae	
113.	Ziziphus jujuba, Lamk.	Ber (बेर)	Rhamnaceae	
114.	Ziziphus xylopyra. Willd.	Ghont (घोंट)	Rhamnaceae	

== Shrubs and undershrubs ==
S. No.	Botanical name	Local name (devanagari)	Family	Photo
115.	Achyranthes aspera, L.	Apamarg (अपामार्ग)	Amarantaceae	
116.	Adhatoda vasica, Neer.	Adusa (अडूसा)	Acanthaceae	
117.	Alangium salviifolium, Thwaites.	Akol (अकोल)	Cornaceae	
118.	Anona squamosa, L.	Sitaphal (सीताफल)	Annonaceae	
119.	Antidesma diandrum, Roth.	Khatua (खटुआ)	Euphorbiaceae	
120.	Antidesma ghaesembilla, Gaertn.	Jondharli (जोंधरली)	Euphorbiaceae	
121.	Argemone mexicana, L.	Siarkanta (सियारकाँटा)	Berberidaceae	
122.	Calotropis gigantea, R.Br.	Aak (आक)	Asclepiadaceae	
123.	Capparis aphylla, Roth.	Karil (करील)	Capparidaceae	
124.	Capparis horrida, L.	Ulatkanta (उलटकाँटा)	Capparidaceae	
125.	Carissa spinarum, A.DC.	Karonda (करोंदा)	Apocynaceae	
126.	Cassia auriculata, L.	Tarwar (तरवर)	Leguminosae	
127.	Cassia tora, L.	Panwar (पंवार)	Leguminosae	
128.	Clerodendron infortunatum, Gaertn.	Bhant (भांट)	Verbenaceae	
128A.	Clerodendron phlomidis, L.	Inni (इन्नी)	Verbenaceae	
129.	Colebrookea oppositifolia, Smith.	Kalabansa (कालाबांसा)	Labiatae	
130.	Desmodium pulchellum, Benth.	Chipti (चिपटी)	Leguminosae	
131.	Dodonoea visocosa, L.	Kharenta (खरेंटा)	Sapindaceae	
132	Embelia tsjeriam-cottam, (Roem. & Schult.) A.DC.	Baibirang (बायबिरंग)	Myrsinaceae	
133.	Eriolaena hookariana, Wight & Arn.	Bhoti (भोटी)	Sterculiaceae	
134.	Eugenia heyneana. Wall.	Kath Jamun (कठजामुन)	Myrtaceae	
135.	Euphorbia neriifolia, L.	Thuar (थूअर)	Euphorbiaceae	
136.	Gymnosporia montana, (Roth) Benth.	Baikal (बेकल)	Celastraceae	
137.	Grewia hirsuta, Vahl.	Gursakri (गुड़सकरी)	Tiliaceae	
138.	Helicteres isora, L.	Marorphali (मरोड़फली)	Sterculiaceae	
139.	Holarrhena antidysenterica, Wall.	Kurchi (कुरची)	Apocynaceae	
140.	Hygrophila spinosa, T.A.	Talmakhana (तालमखाना)	Acanthaceae	
141.	Indigofera pulchella, Roxb.	Neel (नील)	Leguminosae	
142.	Lantana camara, L.	Raimunia (रायमुनिया)	Verbenaceae	
143.	Leea macrophylla, Roxb.	Hathikand (हाथीकंद)	Vitaceae	
144.	Nyctanthes arbortristis, L.	Harsingar (हारसिंगार)	Verbenaceae	
145.	Opuntia dillenii, Hair.	Nagphani (नागफनी)	Cactaceae	
146.	Petalidium barlerioides, Nees.	Indrajata (इन्द्रजटा)	Acanthaceae	
147.	Pogostemon plectranthoides, Desf.	Kora (कोरा)	Labiatae	
148.	Salix tetrasperma, Roxb.	Bainsa (बैंसा)	Salicaceae	
149.	Strobilanthes callosus, Nees.	Maruadona (मरुआदोना)	Acanthaceae	
150.	Tamarix dioica, Roxb.	Jhau (झाऊ)	Tamaricaceae	
151.	Tribulus terrestris, L.	Gokhuru (गोखरू)	Zygophyllaceae	
152.	Waltheria indica, L.	Halduli (हलदुली)	Sterculiaceae	
153.	Woodfordia floribunda, Salist.	Dhawai (धवई)	Lythraceae	
154.	Ziziphus rugosa, Lamk.	Churna (चूरना)	Rhamnaceae	
155.	Ziziphus rotundifolia, Lamk.	Jharberi (झरबेरी)	Rhamnaceae	

== Climbers ==
S. No.	Botanical name	Local name	Family
156.	Abrus precatorius, Linn.	Gunja (गुंजा)	Leguminosae
157.	Acacia caesia, W. & A.	Gurar (गुरार)	Leguminosae
158.	Acacia pennata, Willd.	Raoni (रोनी)	Leguminosae
159.	Bauhinia vahlii, W. & A.	Mahul (माहुल)	Leguminosae
160.	Butea superba, Roxb.	Palasbel (पलासबेल)	Leguminosae
161.	Caesalpinia bonducella, Flem.	Sagargoti (सागरगोटी)	Leguminosae
162.	Calycopteris floribunda, Lamk.	Kukaranj (कुकरांज)	Combretaceae
163.	Celastrus paniculata, Willd.	Malkangni (मालकांगनी)	Celastraceae
164.	Combretum decandrum, Roxb.	Pivarbel (पिवरबेल)	Combretaceae
165.	Combretum ovalifolium, Roxb.	Hathisandan (हाथीसान्दन)	Combretaceae
166.	Cryptolepis buchanani, R. & S.	Nagbel (नागबेल)	Asclepiadaceae
167.	Cuscuta reflexa, Roxb.	Amarbel (अमरबेल)	Convolvulaceae
168.	Derris scandens, Benth.	Tupbel (तुपबेल)	Leguminosae
169.	Dioscorea dremona, Roxb.	Baichandi (बैचांदी)	Dioscoreaceae
170.	Gloriosa superba, Linn.	Agnishikha (अग्निशिखा)	Liliaceae
171.	Gymnema sylvestre, R. Br.	Gudmar (गुडमार)	Asclepiadaceae
172.	Ichnocarpus frutescens, Br.	Dhimarbel (ढीमर बेल)	Apocynaceae
173.	Marsdenia tenacissima, W. &A.	Chikti (चिकटी)	Asclepiadaceae
174.	MIillettia auriculata, Baker.	Gauj (गौज)	Leguminosae.
175.	Mucuna pruriens, DC.	Kewanch (केवांच)	Leguminosae
176.	Smilax macrophylla, Roxb.	Ramdaton (रामदतोन)	Liliaceae
177.	Spatholobus roxburghii, Benth.	Nasbel (नसबेल)	Leguminosae
178.	Tinospora cordifolia, Miers.	Giloy (गिलोय)	Menispermaceae
179.	Vallaris heyner, Spreng.	Dudhbel (दूधबेल)	Apocynaceae
180.	Ventilago calyculata, Tul.	Keoti (केवटी)	Rhamnaceae
181.	Ziziphus oenoplia, Mill.	Makor (मकोर)	Rhamnaceae

== Grasses ==
S. No.	Botanical name	Local name (devanagari)	Family
182.	Apluda varia, Hack	Phuli (फुली)	Gramineae
183.	Chionachne koenigii, Thw.	Karpia (कर्पिया)	Gramineae
184.	Chrysopgon montanus, Trin	Chikua (चिकुआ)	Gramineae
185.	Coix gigantea, Kon.	Garru (गर्रू)	Gramineae
186.	Cymbopogon martini, Wats.	Rusa (रूसा)	Gramineae
187.	Cynodon dactylon, Pers.	Doob (दूब)	Gramineae
188.	Desmostachya bipinnata, Stapf.	Kush (कुश)	Gramineae
189.	Dichanthuium annulatum, Stapf.	Marwel (मारवेल)	Gramineae
190.	Echinochloa colona, Link.	Sama (समा)	Gramineae
191.	Eragrostis tenella, Link.	Bhurbhusi (भुरभुसी)	Gramineae
192.	Eulaliopsis binata, C. E. Hubb.	Sabai (सबई)	Gramineae
193.	Heteropogon contortus, Beauv.	Kusul (कुसल)	Gramineae
194.	Imperata cylindrica, P. Beauv.	Chhir (छीर)	Gramineae
195.	Ischaemum pilosum, Hack.	Kunda (कुंदा)	Gramineae
196.	Pennisetum hohenackeri, Hochst.	Moya (मोया)	Gramineae
197.	Phragmites karka, Trin.	Nal (नाल)	Gramineae
198.	Saccharum spontaneum, Linn.	Kans (कांस)	Gramineae
199.	Sehima sulcatum, A. Camus.	Paonia (पोनिया)	Gramineae
200.	Themeda quadrivalvis, O. Kuntz.	Gunher (गुन्हेर)	Gramineae
201.	Thysanolaena maxima, O. Kuntz.	Phulbuhari (फूलबुहारी)	Gramineae
202.	Tripidium bengalense, Retz.	Munj (मुंज)	Gramineae
203.	Vetiveria zizaniodes, Nash.	Khus (खस)	Gramineae

== Other plants ==
S. No.	Botanical name	Local name (devanagari )	Family
204.	Bambusa arundinacea, Willd.	Kanta bans (कांटाबांस)	Gramineae
205.	Borassus flabellifer, L.	Tad (ताड़)	Palmae
206.	Dendrocalamus strictus, Nees.	Bans (बांस)	Gramineae
207.	Loranthus longiflorus, Desr.	Bandha (बंधा)	Loranthaceae
208.	Phoenix sylvestris. Roxb.	Khajur (खजूर)	Palmae
