= Lacore =

Lacore is a surname. Notable people with the surname include:

- Suzanne Lacore (1875–1975), French Under-Secretary of State for Child Protection in 1936
- Nancy Lacore (born 1968), American vice-admiral and Chief of Navy Reserve until 2026 and politician-elect

== See also ==
- Ficus lacor, large evergreen tree of family Moraceae, native to Asia and Australia
- St. Mary's Hospital Lacor, missionary-founded institution in Northern Uganda
