= Euceraea =

Scientific classification
- Kingdom: Plantae
- Clade: Embryophytes
- Clade: Tracheophytes
- Clade: Spermatophytes
- Clade: Angiosperms
- Clade: Eudicots
- Clade: Rosids
- Order: Malpighiales
- Family: Salicaceae
- Subfamily: Samydoideae
- Genus: Euceraea; Mart.

Type species
- Euceraea nitida Mart.

Species
- 3; see text

Genus of flowering plants

Euceraea is a genus of flowering plants in the family Salicaceae. The genus is native to northern South America throughout the North Region of Brazil, Colombia, Guyana, Suriname, and Venezuela.

Previously it was treated in the family Flacourtiaceae but was moved along with its close relatives to the Salicaceae based on analyses of DNA data. Euceraea is closely related to the genera Casearia and Neoptychocarpus, but differs in its inflorescences of composite spikes. One species, Euceraea rheophytica, is a rheophyte.

In 2022, Euceraea became a synonym of the genus Casearia, though many sources still consider the genus separate.

== Known species ==
The following species are accepted by World Flora Online:

- Euceraea nitida Mart.
- Euceraea rheophytica P.E.Berry & M.E.Olson
- Euceraea sleumeriana Steyerm. & Maguire
