= Euceraea rheophytica =

Scientific classification
- Kingdom: Plantae
- Clade: Tracheophytes
- Clade: Angiosperms
- Clade: Eudicots
- Clade: Rosids
- Order: Malpighiales
- Family: Salicaceae
- Genus: Euceraea
- Species: E. rheophytica

Binomial name
- Euceraea rheophytica P.E.Berry & M.E.Olson

Species of flowering plant

Euceraea rheophytica is a species of flowering plant in the family Salicaceae.

The plant is known exclusively from frequently flash-flooded riverbanks of a deep river canyon that bisects the Cerro de la Neblina massif in southernmost Venezuela at altitudes of 350 to 780 m (1,150 to 2,560 ft).

== Description ==
The plant is a densely branched shrub that grows to a height of 1–2 m (3 ft 3 in – 6 ft 7 in) with slender, glabrous stems. The leaves, which are glabrous and chartaceous, are narrowly lanceolate, measuring 35–80 mm (1.4–3.1 in) long by 4–15 mm (0.16–0.59 in) wide. They have an acute tip and an acuminate base, with scattered glandular punctations on the underside. The leaf margins have small, sharply ascending glandular teeth. There are 9-14 secondary veins on each side of the midvein, which connect to form a prominent vein near the edge. The petiole is 4–8 mm (0.16–0.31 in) long, and the paired stipules are 3–9 mm (0.12–0.35 in) long, clasping the terminal bud, but they soon fall off, leaving lateral scars that are 1–1.5 mm (0.039–0.059 in) wide with several small teeth. The inflorescences are located near the end of the branches and are laxly flowered spikes that are 2–4 cm (0.79–1.57 in) long. The flowers, which can be either bisexual or male, are sessile. The outer bract is cupular and about 1 mm (0.039 in) in diameter, while the inner bract has two lateral, keeled projections about 1.2 mm (0.047 in) long. The sepals are white, overlapping, and connected at the base for 0.5 mm (0.020 in), measuring 2 mm (0.079 in) long and 1.6 mm (0.063 in) wide. There are 8 stamens; the 4 longer ones are 1 mm (0.039 in) long and are opposite of the sepals, while the 4 shorter ones are 0.6 mm (0.024 in) long and alternate with the sepals. The anthers are bilocular and nearly spherical, 0.3 mm (0.012 in) wide. There are 8 disk lobes, spatulate and hairy, 0.3 mm (0.012 in) long, alternating with the stamens and connected at the base. The rudimentary ovary is superior and 0.2 mm (0.0079 in) tall. Euceraea rheophytica is a rheophyte.

== Taxonomy ==
In 2022, Euceraea became a synonym of the genus Casearia, though many sources still recognize the species by its first name. Plants of the World Online named the species Casearia rheophytica.
