= Euceraea sleumeriana =

Conservation status
- Vulnerable (IUCN 3.1)

Scientific classification
- Kingdom: Plantae
- Clade: Tracheophytes
- Clade: Angiosperms
- Clade: Eudicots
- Clade: Rosids
- Order: Malpighiales
- Family: Salicaceae
- Genus: Euceraea
- Species: E. sleumeriana

Binomial name
- Euceraea sleumeriana Steyerm. & Maguire

Species of flowering plant

Euceraea sleumeriana is a species of flowering plant in the family Salicaceae.

The plant is exclusively found in the type area, Cerro Jaua, a tepui in the state of Bolívar, Venezuela. It typically grows in shrubberies and forests at altitudes ranging from 1,800 to 2,100 m (5,900 to 6,900 ft).

There are no known uses of Euceraea sleumeriana in trade.

== Description ==
The plant is a small tree, reaching a height of around 3 m (9.8 ft), with a slender, bare stem below the branching points. The branches are smooth and hairless. The leaves are elliptic-obovate in shape, with a bluntly pointed tip about 5 mm (0.20 in) long and tapering at the base where they attach to the petiole. They are leathery, quite rigid, and smooth, lacking visible dots at maturity, with fine glandular serrations mainly near the upper part of the leaf blade. The leaves typically measure between 6.0 to 11.5 cm (2.4 to 4.5 in) in length and 3.0 to 5.5 cm (1.2 to 2.2 in) in width. They have 8 to 11 pairs of lateral venation that are fairly straight from the midrib, arching slightly and becoming obscure near the edges. The veins are oblique and slightly raised on both sides, with inconspicuous network patterns. The petiole is 7.0 to 12.0 mm (0.28 to 0.47 in). The stipules are lanceolate, pointed, measuring 10.0 to 11.0 mm (0.39 to 0.43 in) long and 2.0 to 4.0 mm (0.079 to 0.157 in) wide at the base. The panicles are located in the leaf axils, elongated with few branches and loosely arranged flowers, and smooth, reaching up to 15.0 cm (5.9 in) in length, including the peduncle which is 2.0 to 3.0 cm (0.79 to 1.18 in) long. The flowers resemble those of Euceraea nitida.

== Taxonomy ==
In 2022, Euceraea became a synonym of the genus Casearia, though many sources still recognize the species by its first name. Plants of the World Online named the species Casearia sleumeriana.

== Conservation status ==
Euceraea sleumeriana is listed as VU by the IUCN Red List, though its population trend is stable. Threats include recreational activities, climate change, and severe weather. There are currently no conservation plans in place for Euceraea sleumeriana, but its range is limited to the Jaua-Sarisariñama National Park and the Arrau Turtle Wildlife Refuge, which guarantees prolonged survival.
