= Casearia kaalaensis =

Conservation status
- Endangered (IUCN 3.1)

Scientific classification
- Kingdom: Plantae
- Clade: Tracheophytes
- Clade: Angiosperms
- Clade: Eudicots
- Clade: Rosids
- Order: Malpighiales
- Family: Salicaceae
- Genus: Casearia
- Species: C. kaalaensis

Binomial name
- Casearia kaalaensis Lescot & Sleumer

Species of flowering plant

Casearia kaalaensis is a species of flowering plant in the family Salicaceae. It is endemic to New Caledonia.
