= Euceraea nitida =

Conservation status
- Least Concern (IUCN 3.1)

Scientific classification
- Kingdom: Plantae
- Clade: Tracheophytes
- Clade: Angiosperms
- Clade: Eudicots
- Clade: Rosids
- Order: Malpighiales
- Family: Salicaceae
- Genus: Euceraea
- Species: E. nitida

Binomial name
- Euceraea nitida Mart.

Species of flowering plant

Euceraea nitida is a species of flowering plant in the family Salicaceae. It is the type species of its genus, Euceraea.

The plant is found in Amazonian regions of Colombia, Venezuela, Guyana, Suriname, and the North Region of Brazil. It thrives in forest ecosystems, often near streams, within slope forests, along forest-savannah borders, and in disturbed savannah woodlands or scrublands. Additionally, it is commonly seen on mesas, steep slopes, and cliff edges, on quartzite, rocky, or sandy soils, at altitudes ranging from 150 to 1,615 m (492 to 5,299 ft).

There are no known uses of Euceraea nitida in trade.

== Description ==
The plant grows as a shrub or small tree and reaches a height of up to 10 m (33 ft) with a trunk diameter of up to 8 cm (3.1 in). Exhibiting a pyramidal shape, the plant is glabrous with gray to blackish bark characterized by lengthwise fissures. The slender, round branchlets end with sparse leaves, tips being purplish and shiny while older parts are gray, bearing prominent leaf scars. The leaves are oblong to elliptic, with an acuminate apex and a cuneate base extending to the petiole. Initially membranaceous, they become thin-coriaceous and nearly impunctate with age, brittle and shiny on both sides, with serrate edges, measuring 7.0 to 12.0 cm (2.8 to 4.7 in) in length and 2.5 to 4.0 cm (0.98 to 1.57 in) in width. The prominent midrib is noticeable on both sides with numerous close lateral veins forming an irregular network. The petiole is 8 to 13 mm (0.31 to 0.51 in) long, while the ovate-lanceolate stipules, 8 to 10 mm (0.31 to 0.39 in) long, are caducous, leaving scars 1.5 to 2.5 mm (0.059 to 0.098 in) broad. Short-pedunculate pyramidal panicles arise from the upper 1 to 3 axils, measuring 5.0 to 15.0 cm (2.0 to 5.9 in) in length and 3.0 to 9.0 cm (1.2 to 3.5 in) in width, and consist of densely flowered spikes. The minute, white or cream, scented flowers are nearly stalkless and appear 1 to 3 together on the slender, angular-compressed rachis. The flowers are characterized by 4 membranaceous sepals, 1.5 to 2.0 mm (0.059 to 0.079 in) long, which are caducous. They contain 8 stamens, alternately longer and shorter, separated by disk-like appendages, with the ovoid, glabrous ovary housing 4 to 6 short radiate stigmas. The indehiscent berry-like fruit is not yet known in its fully mature state and contains 1 to 3 arillate seeds.

== Taxonomy ==
In 2022, Euceraea became a synonym of the genus Casearia, though many sources still recognize the species by its first name. Plants of the World Online named the species Casearia euceraea.

== Conservation status ==
Euceraea nitida is listed as LC by the IUCN Red List and is very stable with over one million mature individuals in the wild. There are no known threats that endanger the species, and neither are there any conservation plans in place.
