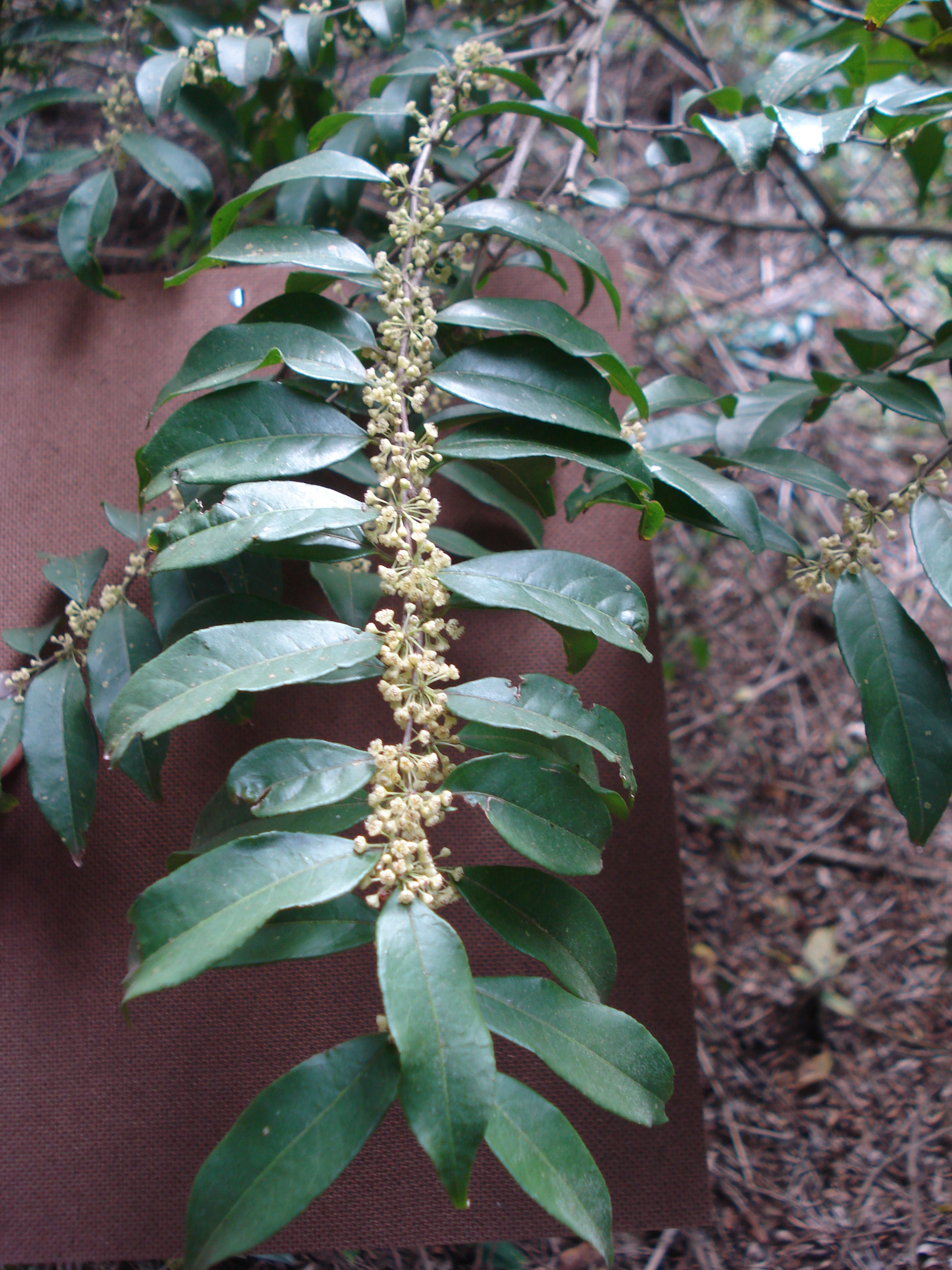
- A photo showing a flowering branch of Casearia sylvestris

Conservation status
- Least Concern (IUCN 3.1)

Scientific classification
- Kingdom: Plantae
- Clade: Tracheophytes
- Clade: Angiosperms
- Clade: Eudicots
- Clade: Rosids
- Order: Malpighiales
- Family: Salicaceae
- Genus: Casearia
- Species: C. sylvestris

Binomial name
- Casearia sylvestris Sw.

Infraspecific taxa
- 3; see text.

Synonyms
- List Casearia sylvestris Sw. (Note: Tropicos does not provide any unique synonyms for the accepted subordinate taxa, though it does provide them underneath their parent taxon. Even then, the synonyms of the accepted subordinated taxa are given based on other sources that do provide them.): Casearia cambessedesii Eichler; Casearia celtidifolia de Vriese; Casearia oblongifolia Rusby; Casearia serrulata Sw.; Casearia serrulata J.Sieber ex Griseb.; Casearia sylvestris var. martinicensis J.F.Macbr. ex L.O.Williams; Casearia sylvestris var. sylvestris; Guidonia sylvestris (Sw.) M.Gómez; Samyda sylvestris (Sw.) Poir.; Casearia sylvestris var. lingua (Cambess.) Eichler: Casearia carpinifolia Benth.; Casearia lingua Cambess.; Casearia sylvestris subsp. myricoides (Griseb.) J.E.Gut.: Casearia formosa Urb.; Casearia sylvestris var. myricoides Griseb.; Guidonia sylvestris var. myricoides (Griseb.) M.Gómez; Casearia sylvestris subsp. sylvestris (Note: Casearia sylvestris subsp. sylvestris is not accepted by World Flora Online, instead being replaced by Casearia sylvestris var. sylvestris, which is itself considered a synonym of its parent taxon by Tropicos.): Anavinga samyda C.F.Gaertn.; Casearia affinis Gardner; Casearia attenuata Rusby; Casearia benthamiana Miq.; Casearia caudata Uittien; Casearia chlorophoroidea Rusby; Casearia ekmanii Sleumer; Casearia guantanamensis Vict.; Casearia herbert-smithii Rusby; Casearia integrifolia Vahl ex DC.; Casearia lindeniana Urb.; Casearia onacaensis Rusby; Casearia ovoidea Sleumer; Casearia parviflora J.F.Gmel.; Casearia parviflora Willd.; Casearia parvifolia var. microcarpa Eggers; Casearia punctata Spreng.; Casearia samyda (C.F.Gaertn.) DC.; Casearia schulziana O.C.Schmidt; Casearia subsessiliflora Lundell; Casearia sylvestris subvar. campestri Eichler; Casearia sylvestris subvar. pedicellaris Eichler; Casearia sylvestris var. angustifolia Uittien; Casearia sylvestris var. benthamiana (Miq.) Uittien; Casearia sylvestris var. carpinifolia Briq.; Casearia sylvestris var. chlorophoroidea (Rusby) Sleumer; Casearia sylvestris var. eichleri Briq.; Casearia sylvestris var. paraensis Uittien; Casearia sylvestris var. platyphylla DC.; Casearia sylvestris var. tomentella Rusby; Casearia sylvestris var. wydleri Briq.; Chaetocrater capitatus Ruiz & Pav.; Crateria capitata Pers.; Guidonia sylvestris var. platyphylla (DC.) M.Gómez; Samyda parviflora L.; Samyda parviflora Poir.

= Casearia sylvestris =

Species of flowering plant

Casearia sylvestris, most commonly known as guaçatonga, is a species of flowering plant in the family Salicaceae.

This plant has a very wide distribution, extending from Mexico down to Argentina, throughout the near entirety of Latin America. It grows primarily in the seasonally dry tropical biome but is also common in moist secondary forests and open disturbed areas. Its range spans elevations from 0–2,800 m (0–9,186 ft), reaching heights where cloud forests develop. While it is most abundant in lowland forests, including tropical rainforest and tropical dry forest, it is also found in oak forests and thrives in secondary vegetation.

== Description ==
Casearia sylvestris is a shrub or tree, ranging from 2–25 m (6 ft 7 in – 82 ft 0 in) in height, with evergreen foliage and a trunk that can grow up to 12 cm (4.7 in) in diameter. Its bark is beige, smooth, and lenticellate, while the branches are cylindrical and glabrous. The leaves are elliptic to lanceolate, measuring 3–16 cm (1.2–6.3 in) long and 1.5–6.5 cm (0.59–2.56 in) wide, with a base that is cuneate to obtuse and an apex that is acuminate to caudate. The margins range from entire to slightly serrate, and the surface is typically glabrous with dense pellucid markings. Petioles measure 0.3–1 cm (0.12–0.39 in) long, and stipules are minute, triangular, and caducous. The pale yellow to white, fragrant flowers are produced year-round in axillary fascicles of 10–30 flowers. Pedicels are 2–5 mm (0.079–0.197 in) long, glabrous or puberulous. Sepals are 5 in number, ovate, connate at the base, and erect at anthesis. The 10 stamens are inserted at the apex of the calyx tube, with filaments ranging from 0.5–1.5 mm (0.020–0.059 in) long. Staminodes alternate with the stamens and are slightly pilose. The ovary is glabrous or sparsely pilose at the apex, tapering into a short, three-branched style. The subglobose capsule, 3–5 mm (0.12–0.20 in) in diameter, is glabrous or slightly puberulent at the apex and turns green, reddish, purple, or orange upon ripening before splitting into three valves. Each fruit contains 2–6 seeds that are approximately 1.5–2 mm (0.059–0.079 in) long, ovoid, and glabrous with a light brown foveolate testa, surrounded by a bright red-orange aril. Nicaraguan specimens exhibit notable variation in floral pubescence.

== Common names ==
Casearia sylvestris goes by many names due to its wide distribution. In Brazil, names vary by federative unit, and among the 47 provided unique terms used to refer to the species throughout this country alone, the most notable are baga-de-pomba, cabatão, cafezeiro-do-mato, chá de bugre, caiubim, camarão, cambroé, carvalhinho, língua-de-tiú, marinheiro, são-gonçalo, and pau-de-lagarto. Unique names outside of Brazil include cusé in Bolivia and cafecillo cimarrón and hierba de burro in Paraguay. In Chinese, it goes by 林木脚骨脆, 嘉赐树, 野生鼠尾草, and 野咖啡. (Note: Keep in mind Casearia sylvestris does not exist in China, but it does have common names in the language.) Other names include but are not limited to botoncillo, burro kaa, caroba, corta lengua, crackopen, estralador, gaibim, huesillo, paratudo, pereirinha, pombeiro, quiubra, ramo-de-carne, tiuzinho, varre-forno, white bugru, and wild sage, with guaçatonga being the most abundant term. (Note: Many terms for Casearia sylvestris are shared with other plants as well, which may cause complications when using common names to distinguish between different species, like with Cordia ecalyculata.) (Note: Nearly all of the given common names have some sort of name variation, which you can find in the references provided for the common names, along with more names not shown on this page.) (Note: Using basic or unverified translators may give you an incorrect translation for most foreign names on this page.)

== Etymology ==
The binomial name Casearia sylvestris originates from Johannes Casearius, a late Dutch clergyman, after whom the genus was named. The species epithet sylvestris is derived from Latin, meaning 'wooded' or 'wild.' Common names like guaçatonga, along with a few others, stem from Tupi-Guarani languages, while many other vernacular names reflect their provenance or are inspired by popular observations.

== Taxonomy ==
Casearia sylvestris was first described by Olof Swartz in 1798. Over time, the species has gained a large list of synonyms, totaling 50 across its subordinate taxa.

Casearia sylvestris was historically placed in Samydaceae, though its taxonomic position was long uncertain and often submerged within Flacourtiaceae under older classification systems like Cronquist's or Takhtajan's. In 2002, Samydaceae, including this taxon, were reclassified into Salicaceae, a placement adopted by the APG III system and later recognized by Plants of the World Online, though this classification is not universally accepted.

== Subordinate taxa ==
Casearia sylvestris has 3 accepted subordinate taxa according to Plants of the World Online. The species used to have more, but most were synonymized over time.

=== Casearia sylvestris var. lingua ===
Casearia sylvestris var. lingua is a widely distributed variety found in montane regions and desert fields within the majority of South America, where it grows at altitudes ranging from 0–1,120 m (0–3,675 ft), flowering primarily in August and September. It is a shrub or tree characterized by young branches that are smooth, striated, and slowly pubescent beneath, with leaves that are oblong-lanceolate, rounded at the base, acuminate, serrulate, pellucid-punctate, and glabrous. In dry specimens, leaves can appear lobed and conduplicate, with prominent reticulated venation, especially on the underside. The petioles are canaliculated above, convex at the base, and pubescent, while the stipules are ovate, acuminate, and ciliate. The flowers are pubescent and arranged in sessile, multiflorous umbels in the axils. They possess short pedicels, pale in color, and are supported by small scarious pubescent bracts. The persistent calyx is deeply five-lobed, pubescent, and features a short tube with ovate, acute lobes. There are 20 stamens fused at the base, with fertile filaments subulate and pubescent, while sterile stamens are slightly shorter and smooth. The anthers are rounded, emarginate at the base, and glabrous, with a glandular connective tip. The ovary is ovoid-trigonous, glabrous, and attenuates into a short, trifid style, with five capitate stigmas. Ovules, typically numbering nine, are attached to five linear placentas. The fruit is a spheroid-trigonal capsule, about 5 mm (0.20 in) in diameter, fleshy, glabrous, and crowned with a persistent style. It is marked with five satiral lines and splits into five valves, with placentation occurring along the central axis. The seeds are ellipsoid-oblong, impressed-punctate, glabrous, and about 1 mm (0.039 in) long. The embryo is straight, nearly equal in length to the perisperm, with a terete radicle three times longer than the ovate cotyledons. Traditionally, a decoction of its leaves has been administered internally to treat inflammatory diseases and malignant fevers. The plant goes by a few names, those being cha de frade and lingua de fin.

Observations of Casearia sylvestris var. lingua on iNaturalist peak in February, with 3 verifiable and 1.5 research-grade records, possibly indicating seasonal prominence or increased observer activity. Smaller peaks appear in May and August, while September to December shows almost no observations. Over the past 10 years, research-grade observations show a sharp spike at the end of the year, whereas verifiable observations display multiple peaks, suggesting intermittent observation trends. If observations remain flat or decline despite more observers, this could indicate a genuine change in the taxon’s abundance. Interpretation requires accounting for observer biases and cross-referencing external population data.

Casearia sylvestris var. lingua was first described by Jacques Cambessèdes in 1830 as Casearia lingua, and was reassigned to its current name in 1871 by August W. Eichler.

=== Casearia sylvestris subsp. myricoides ===
Casearia sylvestris subsp. myricoides is a shrub that thrives in the wet tropical biome, specifically within Cuba, exhibits a parvifoliate form characterized by pubescent branches and elliptic leaves, contrasting with the lanceolate-oblong variation where shiny striations are rare.

Casearia sylvestris subsp. myricoides was first described by August Grisebach in 1866 as Casearia sylvestris var. myricoides, and was reassigned to its current name in 2000 by Jorge E. Gutiérrez Amaro.

=== Casearia sylvestris subsp. sylvestris ===
Casearia sylvestris subsp. sylvestris is a shrub or tree, with a very wide distribution spanning throughout the near entirety of Latin America. It grows in the seasonally dry tropical biome at altitudes ranging from 700–1,000 m (2,300–3,300 ft). It is commonly known as laurel espada, palo de queresas, and sarna de perro. (Note: There is no author listed for this subspecies, and its exact origin is unverified.)

== Uses ==
In traditional medicine, Casearia sylvestris is used to treat inflammation, skin lesions, and microbial infections. Steaped in water, the leaves and bark are also regarded to be a useful laxative and to help with rheumatic disorders. Research into the essential oils is ongoing.

Casearia sylvestris is valued for its wood, resin, and ecological benefits. It is a fast-growing species, thriving in tropical forests, salty soils, full sun, and dappled shade, and regenerates well through coppicing, with a lifespan of up to 20 years. Its globose capsule produces 2–5 seeds wrapped in a yellow, edible aril, contrasting with the potentially toxic capsules of some species. Cultivation of Casearia sylvestris relies on fresh seeds, best collected when capsules begin to open, rinsed to remove arils, and sown in shaded nursery beds. Germination rates are low but variable, with seedlings sprouting within 20–30 days, reaching transplant size within months. Cuttings also serve as an alternative propagation method. The tree is used in reforestation and wildlife restoration, providing food for birds and pollen for bees, with flowers that emit a scent resembling honey and urine. Its fine-textured, strong wood, though susceptible to wood-eating organisms, is used for construction, flooring, lathe work, cabinet making, and charcoal production.

== Ecology ==
Casearia sylvestris is a highly adaptive perennial species and demonstrates ecological and genetic diversity, playing a significant role in ecosystems such as the Cerrado, Atlantic Forest, gallery forests, and wetland. Studies have revealed adaptive wood anatomical features, including variations in vessel frequency and ray width, which enhance survival strategies in response to environmental pressures like drought. Research into genetic structures highlights the species’ ability to adapt to restoration processes and natural habitats, showcasing higher genetic variability in restored forests compared to remnants of semi-deciduous seasonal forests. Population genetic studies emphasize the differentiation between sympatric and allopatric subordinate taxa of the taxon, revealing hybridization and genome duplication as factors contributing to the genetic diversity and adaptation of this species. The integration of genetic and ecological findings supports the recognition of distinct evolutionary units, aiding in conservation and restoration efforts. Overall, Casearia sylvestris exemplifies ecological adaptability, genetic complexity, and practical significance within its native range.

== Observation data ==
The observation patterns for Casearia sylvestris on iNaturalist reveal a distinct seasonality in recorded sightings, with research-grade observations remaining relatively low from January to March, increasing in April, and peaking in July before declining in late autumn and winter. Verifiable observations follow a similar trajectory but with generally higher values, reaching a peak in May with around 90 observations. Over the past ten years, observations have steadily increased, with notable spikes in 2022 and 2023, suggesting heightened observer activity or potential shifts in species abundance. The identification of plant sex remains largely unclassified, with a peak in observations with no annotations in August, while instances where sex could not be determined remain fairly stable, slightly increasing in November. The presence of flowers and fruits follows a clear seasonal pattern, with flowers peaking in April and again in September, while fruiting shows a late-year concentration in November. Observations of leaves indicate midyear peaks, especially in June and August, with breaking leaf buds being documented minimally, mostly in April. Overall, these trends likely stem from a combination of ecological cycles, observer behavior, and environmental factors. Increased observations during warmer months may reflect higher species activity and accessibility, while fluctuations in classification accuracy suggest varying levels of observer engagement. The rising documentation over the past decade could indicate a growing interest in the species or improved monitoring efforts.

== Conservation status ==
Casearia sylvestris is broadly distributed, supports a substantial population, and faces no immediate or significant future threats. Consequently, it is classified as LC by the IUCN Red List. Other information on its population size and dynamics are absent at this time and may need further research.
