= Casearia multinervosa =

Scientific classification
- Kingdom: Plantae
- Clade: Embryophytes
- Clade: Tracheophytes
- Clade: Spermatophytes
- Clade: Angiosperms
- Clade: Eudicots
- Clade: Rosids
- Order: Malpighiales
- Family: Salicaceae
- Genus: Casearia
- Species: C. multinervosa

Binomial name
- Casearia multinervosa C.T.White & Sleumer

Species of tree

Casearia multinervosa is a species of flowering plant in the family Salicaceae. A shrub or small tree up to ten metres tall. Found in eastern Australia from coastal northern New South Wales to south eastern Queensland. Often seen growing in the understorey of dry rainforest, associated with the Hoop Pine. The specific epithet describes the prominent leaf veins.
