= Casearia quinduensis =

Conservation status
- Extinct (IUCN 2.3)

Scientific classification
- Kingdom: Plantae
- Clade: Tracheophytes
- Clade: Angiosperms
- Clade: Eudicots
- Clade: Rosids
- Order: Malpighiales
- Family: Salicaceae
- Genus: Casearia
- Species: †C. quinduensis

Binomial name
- †Casearia quinduensis Tulasne

Extinct species of flowering plant

Casearia quinduensis was a species of flowering plant in the family Salicaceae. It was endemic to Colombia.
