= Casearia engleri =

Conservation status
- Vulnerable (IUCN 3.1)

Scientific classification
- Kingdom: Plantae
- Clade: Tracheophytes
- Clade: Angiosperms
- Clade: Eudicots
- Clade: Rosids
- Order: Malpighiales
- Family: Salicaceae
- Genus: Casearia
- Species: C. engleri

Binomial name
- Casearia engleri Gilg

Species of flowering plant

Casearia engleri is a species of flowering plant in the family Salicaceae. It is endemic to Tanzania. It grows in a wet tropical biome, and can be up to 20 meters (66 ft) tall.
