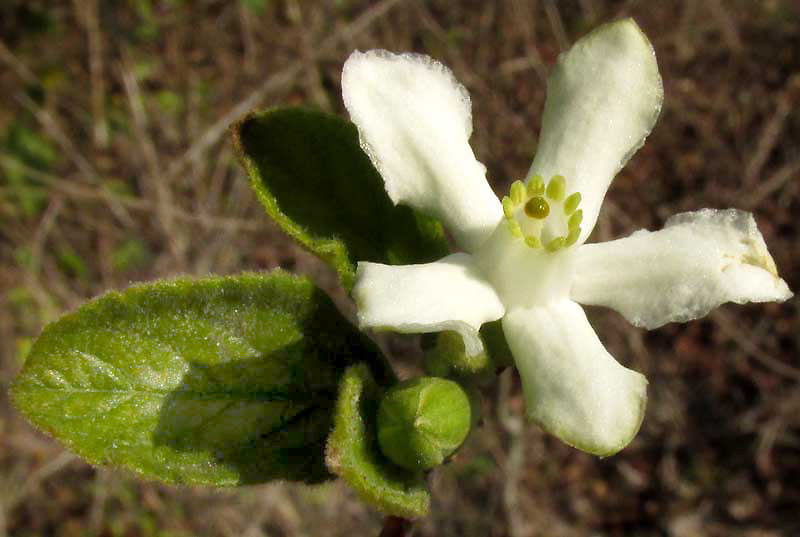
- Casearia yucatanensis flower

Scientific classification
- Kingdom: Plantae
- Clade: Tracheophytes
- Clade: Angiosperms
- Clade: Eudicots
- Clade: Rosids
- Order: Malpighiales
- Family: Salicaceae
- Genus: Casearia
- Species: C. yucatanensis

Binomial name
- Casearia yucatanensis (Standl.) T.Samar. & M.H.Alford

Synonyms
- Samyda yucatanensis Standl.

= Casearia yucatanensis =

Species of plant

Casearia yucatanensis, with no commonly used English name, is a species of flowering plant belonging to the family Salicaceae.

== Description ==
Casearia yucatanensis is a shrub or tree up to 12m tall (~39 feet). Its leaves are deciduous, have short petioles, their blades are oval to somewhat wider above their middles, and their tips are rounded to pointed, but not sharply. Blade margins vary from having no indentations or teeth to presenting a few widely separated and not well defined ones. Blades gradually diminish in width at their bases and are densely hairy with longer hairs on the undersurfaces. Ducts and cavities appearing as pellucid dots occur in the blades.

Flowers arise in angles formed where petioles connect with the stems, either individually on in small, crowded clusters. Flowers have no distinct pedicel, nor do they produce corollas. However, 4 or 5 calyx lobes up to 1cm long (~3/8 inch) expand and look like round-tipped petals. Stamens form a tube up to 4mm long (~3/16 inch). Fruits are spherical, fleshy to leathery, many-seeded capsules which produce a fleshy, red aril in which the seeds are enmeshed.

== Distribution ==
Casearia yucatanensis is endemic just to the southeastern Mexican states of Yucatán, Quintana Roo and Campeche.

== Habitat ==
Casearia yucatanensis occurs in tropical deciduous forests and disturbed areas.

== Conservation status ==
In 2020, the IUCN Red List of Threatened Species classified Casearia yucatanensis as "Near Threatened (NT) under criteria B2b(i,ii,iii)", with a stable population trend. It is considered as potentially threatened by deforestation due to land use change for urban expansion, tourist developments, and forest fires.

== Taxonomy ==
The type specimen of Casearia yucatanensis was collected by Heinrich Wilhelm Schott in Yucatán, Mexico, in May (year unclear in notes), his #603. It is known that Schott was involved in the German settlements in Yucatán during Mexico's Second Empire of 1864–1867. The holotype is filed in the United States National Herbarium as #1,073,356.

The existence of Casearia yucatanensis is seen as a consequence of long-distance dispersal between the Antilles and the Yucatan Peninsula Biotic Province, in an east-to-west direction.

== Etymology ==
The genus name Casearia is New Latin meant to honor Johannes Casearius, a Dutch clergyman who died in 1678.

The species name yucatanensis is New Latin reflecting the fact that the first collection of the species was made in Yucatán, though it's unclear whether the state of Yucatán or the Yucatan Peninsula is meant.

== Gallery ==
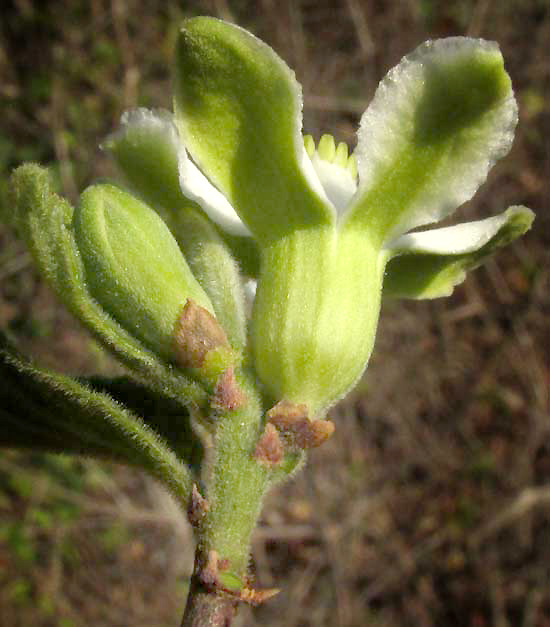
Casearia yucatanensis expanded sepals looking like petals

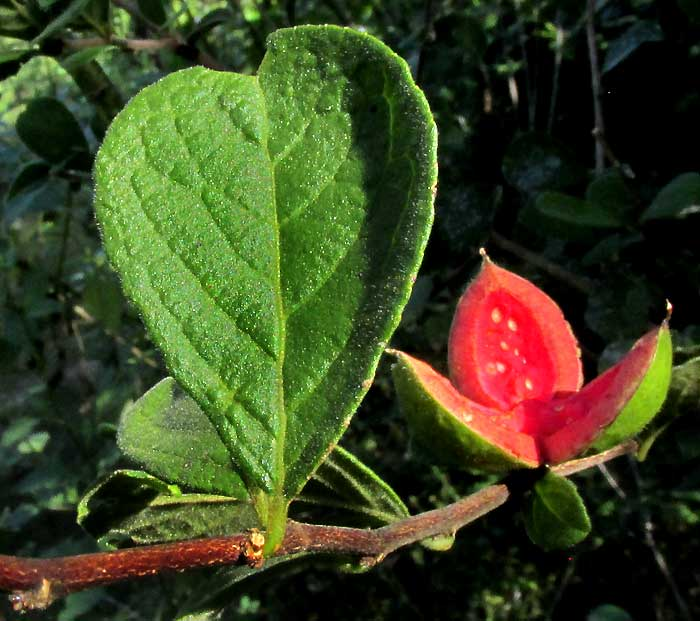
Casearia yucatanensis split-open fruit exposing seeds enmeshed in red aril

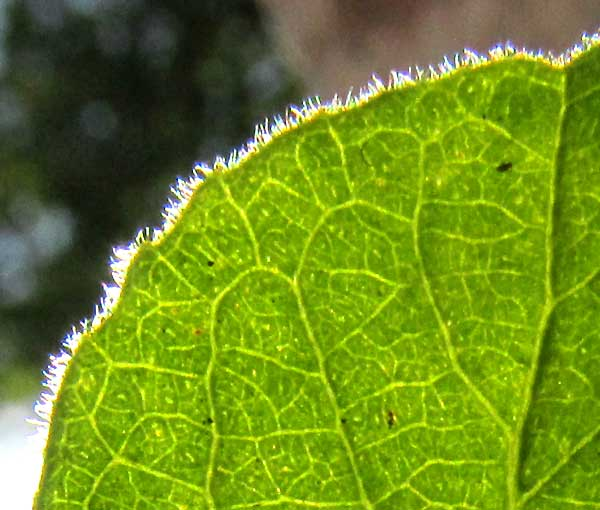
Casearia yucatanensis leaf close-up showing hairs and pellucid dots

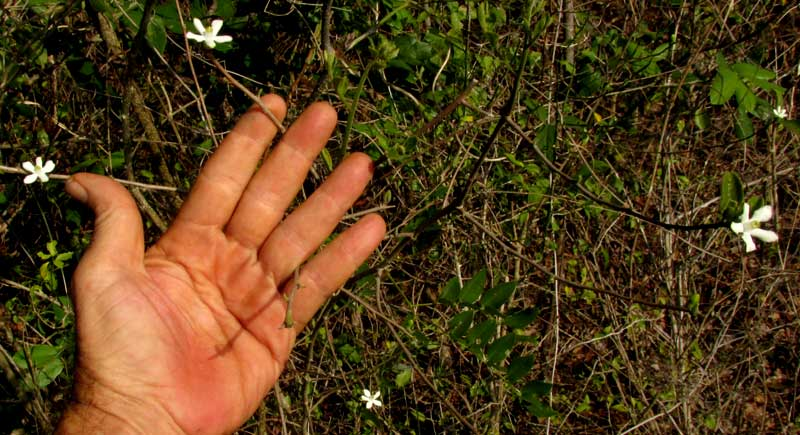
Casearia yucatanensis dispersed flowers on slender branches
