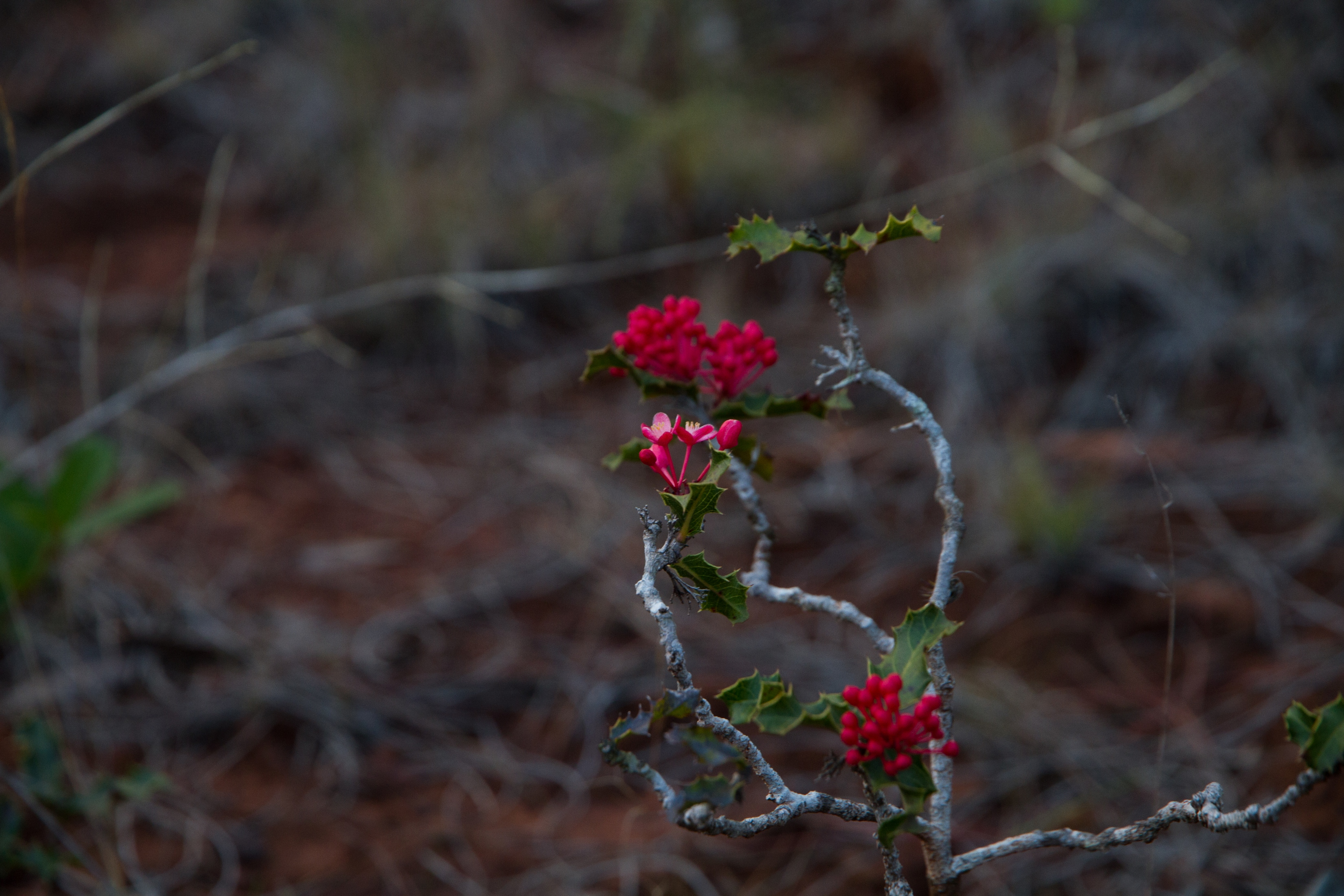

Conservation status
- Vulnerable (IUCN 2.3)

Scientific classification
- Kingdom: Plantae
- Clade: Tracheophytes
- Clade: Angiosperms
- Clade: Eudicots
- Clade: Rosids
- Order: Malpighiales
- Family: Salicaceae
- Genus: Casearia
- Species: C. crassinervis

Binomial name
- Casearia crassinervis Urban

= Casearia crassinervis =

Species of plant in Cuba

Casearia crassinervis is a species of flowering plant in the family Salicaceae. It is endemic to Cuba.
