= Casearia barteri =

Conservation status
- Least Concern (IUCN 3.1)

Scientific classification
- Kingdom: Plantae
- Clade: Tracheophytes
- Clade: Angiosperms
- Clade: Eudicots
- Clade: Rosids
- Order: Malpighiales
- Family: Salicaceae
- Genus: Casearia
- Species: C. barteri

Binomial name
- Casearia barteri Mast.

Synonyms
- Heterotypic Synonyms: Casearia bule Gilg; Casearia thonneri De Wild.

Species of flowering plant

Casearia barteri is a species of flowering plant in the family Salicaceae. It is found in Angola, Cameroon, Central African Republic, the Republic of the Congo, the Democratic Republic of the Congo, Ivory Coast, Equatorial Guinea, Gabon, Ghana, Liberia, Nigeria, São Tomé and Príncipe, Sierra Leone, and Sudan.
