= Casearia macrocarpa =

Conservation status
- Vulnerable (IUCN 2.3)

Scientific classification
- Kingdom: Plantae
- Clade: Tracheophytes
- Clade: Angiosperms
- Clade: Eudicots
- Clade: Rosids
- Order: Malpighiales
- Family: Salicaceae
- Genus: Casearia
- Species: C. macrocarpa

Binomial name
- Casearia macrocarpa C.B.Clarke

Species of tree

Casearia macrocarpa is a species of flowering plant in the family Salicaceae. It is a tree endemic to Peninsular Malaysia. It is threatened by habitat loss.
