= Casearia mauritiana =

Conservation status
- Critically Endangered (IUCN 2.3)

Scientific classification
- Kingdom: Plantae
- Clade: Tracheophytes
- Clade: Angiosperms
- Clade: Eudicots
- Clade: Rosids
- Order: Malpighiales
- Family: Salicaceae
- Genus: Casearia
- Species: C. mauritiana

Binomial name
- Casearia mauritiana Bosser

Species of flowering plant

Casearia mauritiana is a species of flowering plant in the family Salicaceae. It is endemic to Mauritius.
