= Casearia bartlettii =

Scientific classification
- Kingdom: Plantae
- Clade: Tracheophytes
- Clade: Angiosperms
- Clade: Eudicots
- Clade: Rosids
- Order: Malpighiales
- Family: Salicaceae
- Genus: Casearia
- Species: C. bartlettii

Binomial name
- Casearia bartlettii Lundell 1939

Synonyms
- Casearia elegans Standl.; Casearia hintonii Lundell; Samyda bartlettii (Lundell) Lundell

Species of flowering plant

Casearia bartlettii is a species of flowering plant in the family Salicaceae found in Mesoamerica (Belize-Guatemala).
