= Casearia coriifolia =

Conservation status
- Near Threatened (IUCN 3.1)

Scientific classification
- Kingdom: Plantae
- Clade: Tracheophytes
- Clade: Angiosperms
- Clade: Eudicots
- Clade: Rosids
- Order: Malpighiales
- Family: Salicaceae
- Genus: Casearia
- Species: C. coriifolia

Binomial name
- Casearia coriifolia Lescot & Sleumer

Species of flowering plant

Casearia coriifolia is a species of flowering plant in the family Salicaceae. It is a shrub endemic to New Caledonia.
