= Casearia flavovirens =

Conservation status
- Vulnerable (IUCN 2.3)

Scientific classification
- Kingdom: Plantae
- Clade: Tracheophytes
- Clade: Angiosperms
- Clade: Eudicots
- Clade: Rosids
- Order: Malpighiales
- Family: Salicaceae
- Genus: Casearia
- Species: C. flavovirens

Binomial name
- Casearia flavovirens Blume

Species of flowering plant

Casearia flavovirens is a species of flowering plant in the family Salicaceae. It is found in Java and Bali in Indonesia. It is a vulnerable species threatened by habitat loss.
