= Casearia mannii =

Conservation status
- Vulnerable (IUCN 2.3)

Scientific classification
- Kingdom: Plantae
- Clade: Tracheophytes
- Clade: Angiosperms
- Clade: Eudicots
- Clade: Rosids
- Order: Malpighiales
- Family: Salicaceae
- Genus: Casearia
- Species: C. mannii

Binomial name
- Casearia mannii Mast.

Species of flowering plant

Casearia mannii is a species of flowering plant in the family Salicaceae. It is endemic to São Tomé and Príncipe, where it is restricted to the island of Príncipe. It is listed as vulnerable by the IUCN.
