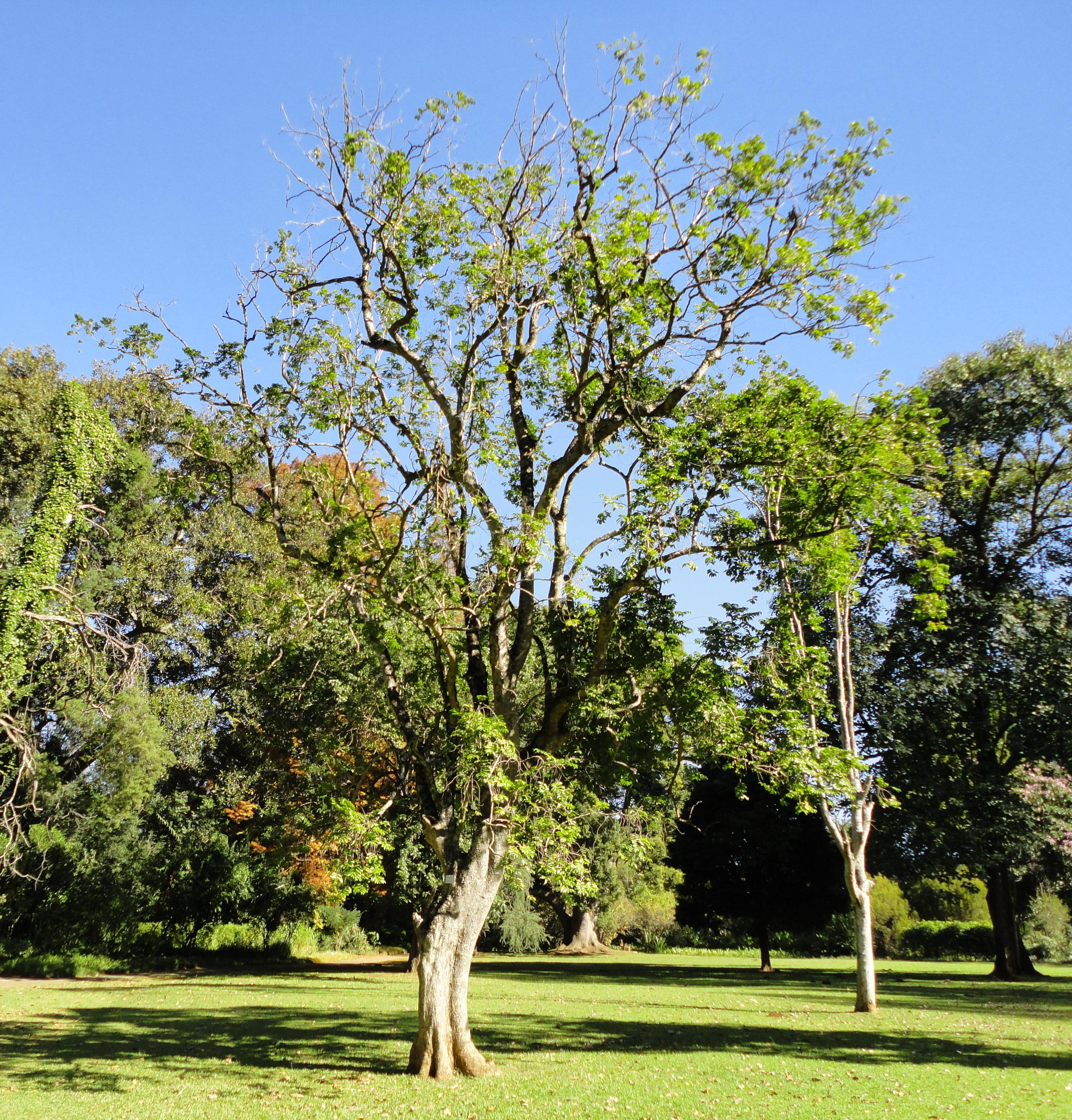
- Growth habit

Conservation status
- Least Concern (IUCN 3.1)

Scientific classification
- Kingdom: Plantae
- Clade: Tracheophytes
- Clade: Angiosperms
- Clade: Eudicots
- Clade: Rosids
- Order: Malpighiales
- Family: Salicaceae
- Genus: Casearia
- Species: C. gladiiformis

Binomial name
- Casearia gladiiformis Mast.

Synonyms
- Heterotypic Synonyms: Casearia holtzii Gilg; Casearia junodii Schinz; Casearia macrodendron Gilg

= Casearia gladiiformis =

Species of tree

Casearia gladiiformis, the sword-leaf, is a species of flowering plant in the family Salicaceae. It is a small tree that occurs mostly in dry coastal forests of south-eastern Africa. It is distributed from the Eastern Cape to Malawi. It bears small inconspicuous flowers in spring. The seeds are released when the woody seed capsule splits open after drying out.

== Gallery ==
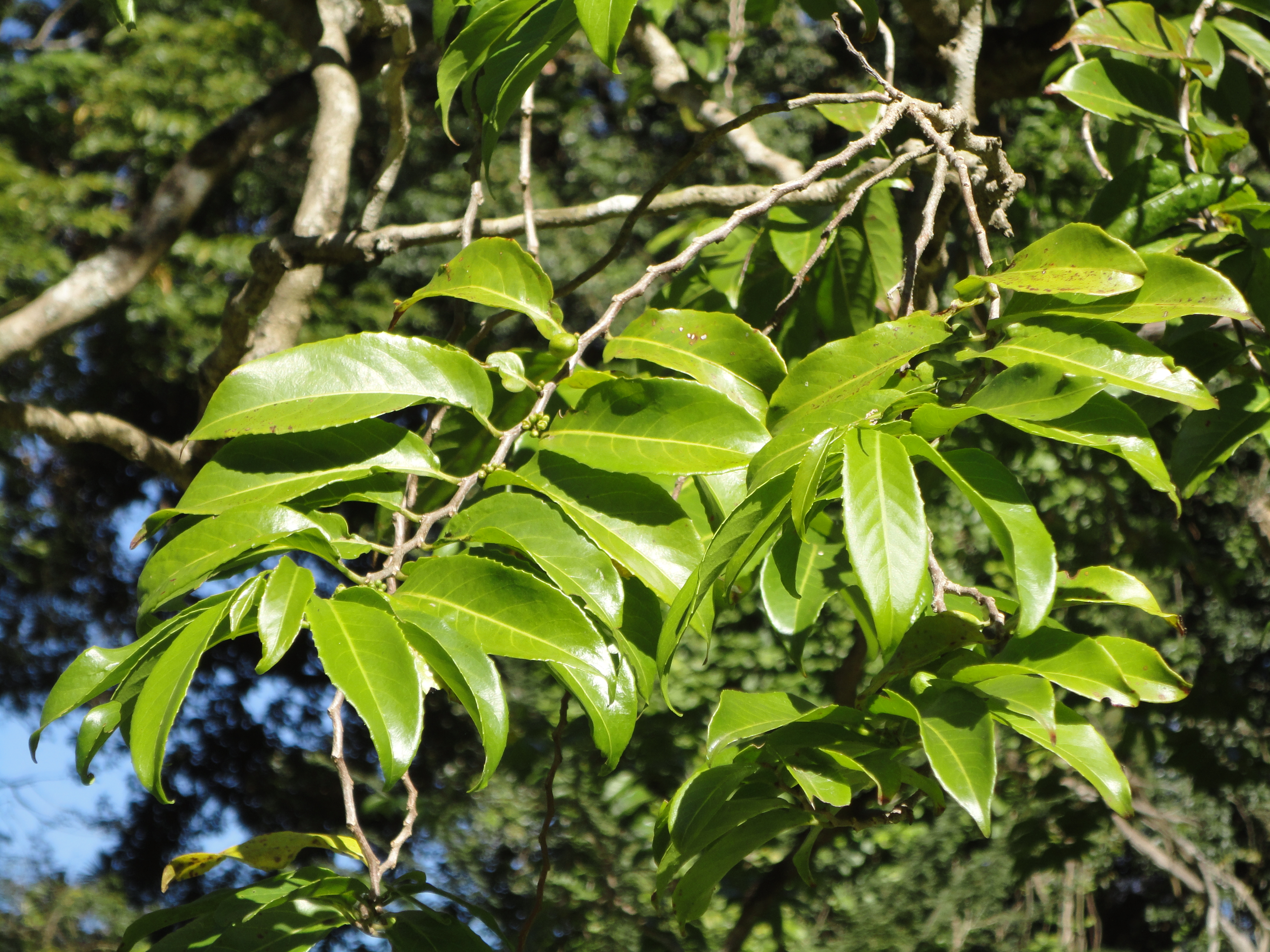
Close-up of the alternately arranged leaves

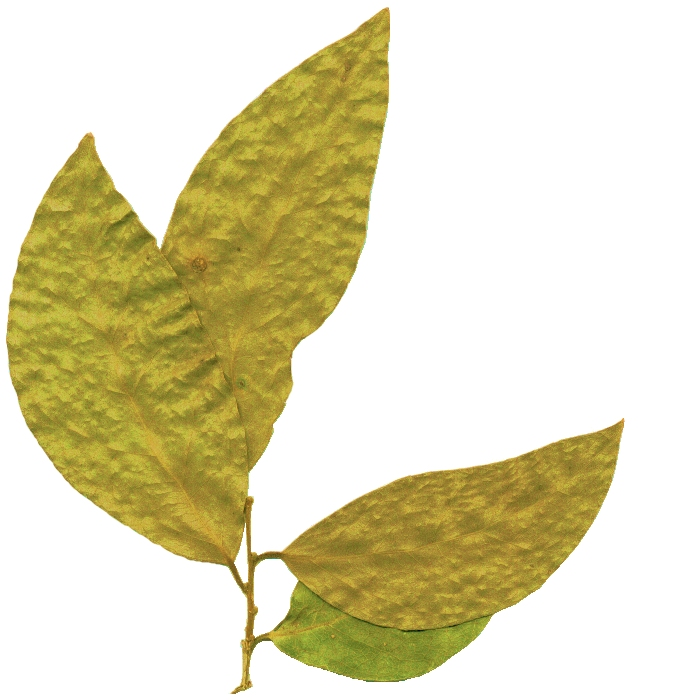
Pressed leaves showing asymmetry
