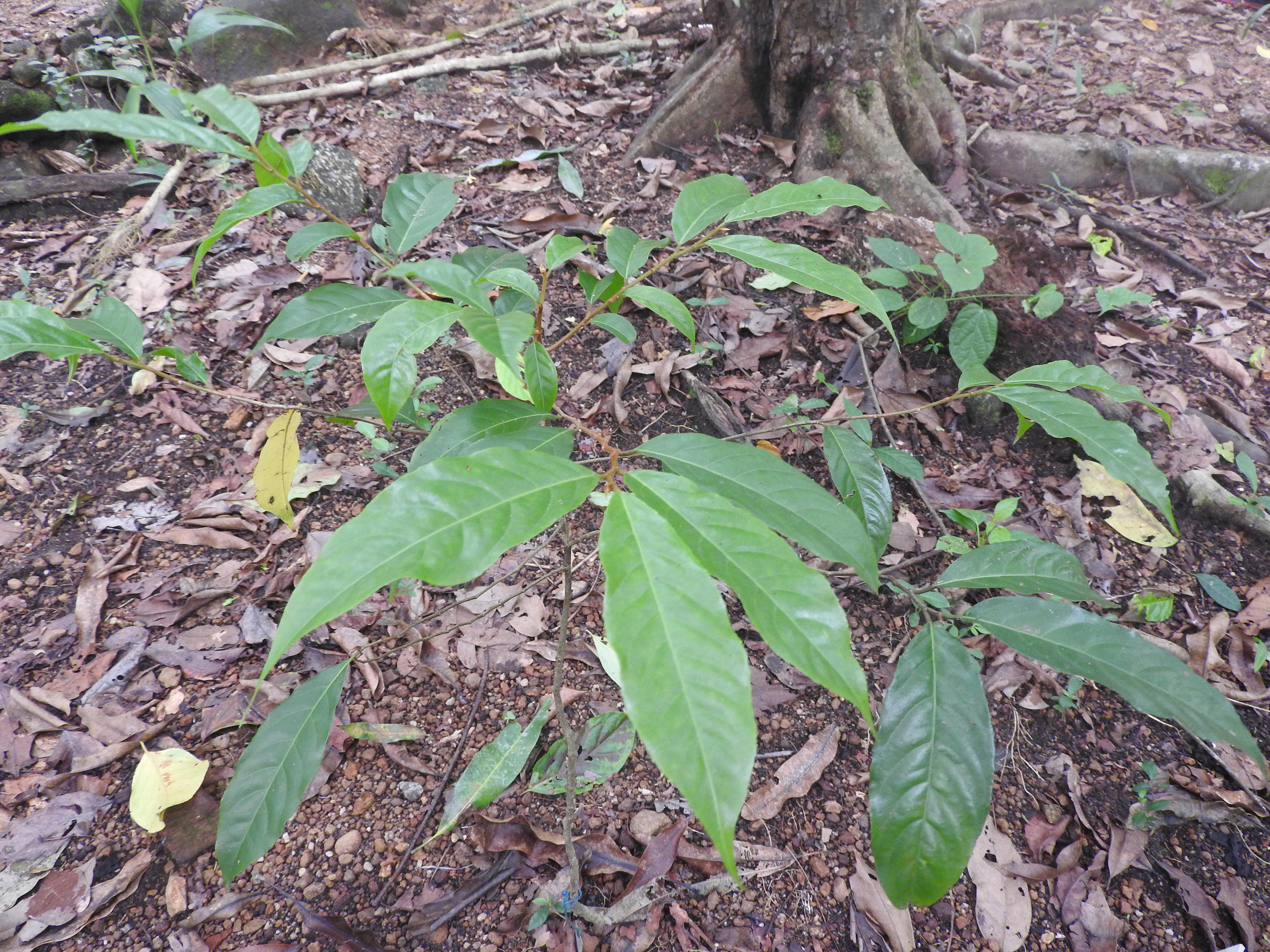

Conservation status
- Vulnerable (IUCN 2.3)

Scientific classification
- Kingdom: Plantae
- Clade: Tracheophytes
- Clade: Angiosperms
- Clade: Eudicots
- Clade: Rosids
- Order: Malpighiales
- Family: Salicaceae
- Genus: Casearia
- Species: C. wynadensis

Binomial name
- Casearia wynadensis Beddome

= Casearia wynadensis =

Species of flowering plant

Casearia wynadensis is a species of flowering plant in the family Salicaceae. It is native to Kerala and Tamil Nadu in India.
