= Casearia mexiae =

Conservation status
- Vulnerable (IUCN 3.1)

Scientific classification
- Kingdom: Plantae
- Clade: Embryophytes
- Clade: Tracheophytes
- Clade: Spermatophytes
- Clade: Angiosperms
- Clade: Eudicots
- Clade: Rosids
- Order: Malpighiales
- Family: Salicaceae
- Genus: Casearia
- Species: C. mexiae

Binomial name
- Casearia mexiae Sandwith

Species of flowering plant

Casearia mexiae is a species of flowering plant in the family Salicaceae. It is endemic to Ecuador. Its natural habitat is subtropical or tropical moist montane forests.
