= Casearia seethalakshmiae =

Scientific classification
- Kingdom: Plantae
- Clade: Tracheophytes
- Clade: Angiosperms
- Clade: Eudicots
- Clade: Rosids
- Order: Malpighiales
- Family: Salicaceae
- Genus: Casearia
- Species: C. seethalakshmiae

Binomial name
- Casearia seethalakshmiae V.Suresh & Ambika

Species of plant

Casearia seethalakshmiae is a species in the family Salicaceae, and is confined to Palakkad, Kerala. It is named after Dr.Seethalakshmi who was a scientist in Kerala Forest Research Institute.

== Description ==
The species grows as a small shrub with greenish yellow flowers.
