= Casearia flexula =

Conservation status
- Data Deficient (IUCN 2.3)

Scientific classification
- Kingdom: Plantae
- Clade: Tracheophytes
- Clade: Angiosperms
- Clade: Eudicots
- Clade: Rosids
- Order: Malpighiales
- Family: Salicaceae
- Genus: Casearia
- Species: C. flexula

Binomial name
- Casearia flexula Ridley

Species of flowering plant

Casearia flexula is a species of flowering plant in the family Salicaceae. It is endemic to Peninsular Malaysia. It is threatened by habitat loss.
