= Casearia atlantica =

Conservation status
- Least Concern (IUCN 3.1)

Scientific classification
- Kingdom: Plantae
- Clade: Tracheophytes
- Clade: Angiosperms
- Clade: Eudicots
- Clade: Rosids
- Order: Malpighiales
- Family: Salicaceae
- Genus: Casearia
- Species: C. atlantica

Binomial name
- Casearia atlantica Sleumer

Species of flowering plant

Casearia atlantica is a species of flowering plant in the family Salicaceae. It is a tree endemic to Panama. It is threatened by habitat loss.
