= Samydaceae =

Family of plants

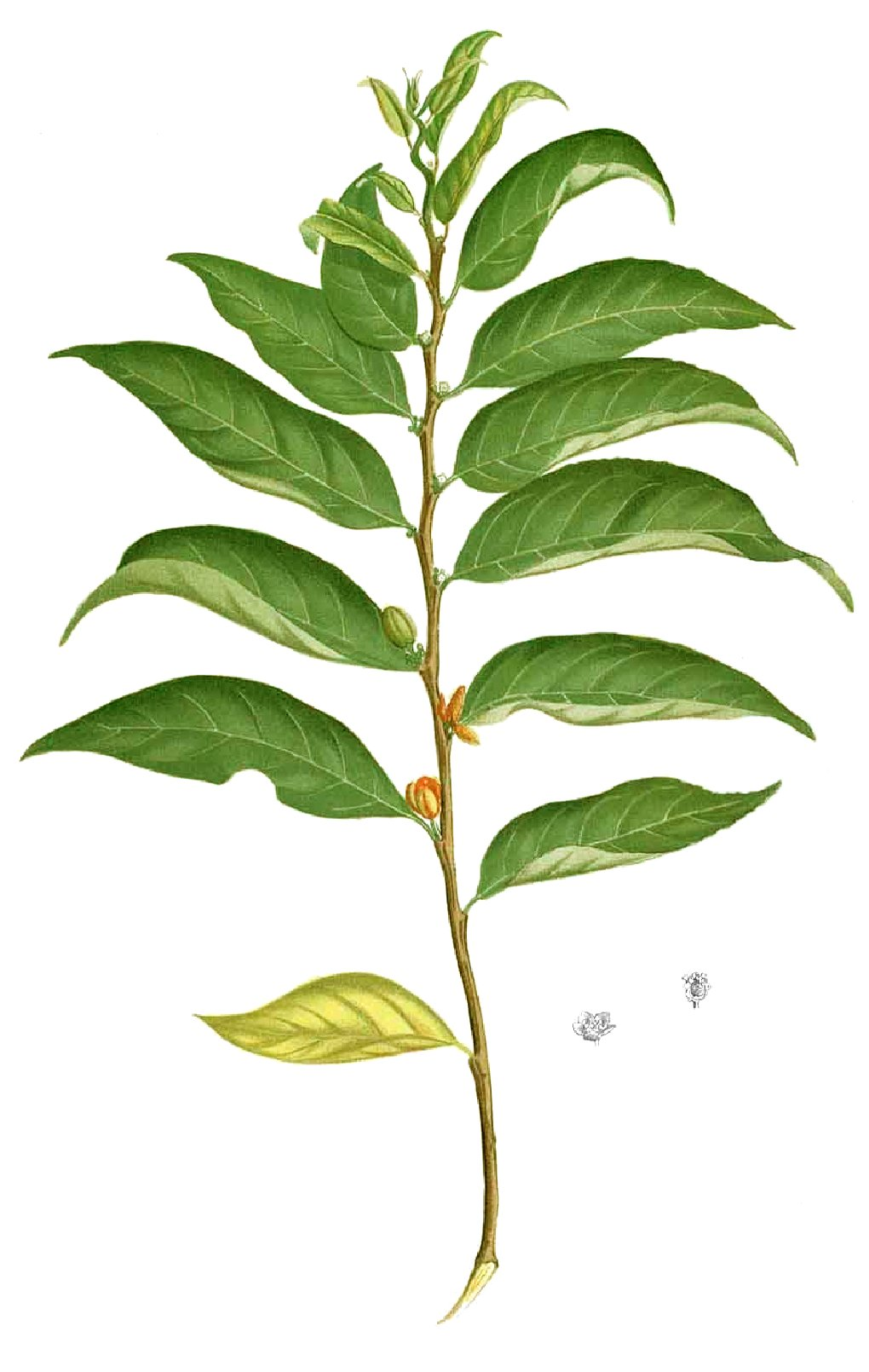
Casearia fuliginosa

Samydaceae is a family of tropical and subtropical woody plants, its best known genus being Casearia. It has always been of uncertain placement, in the past usually being submerged in the family Flacourtiaceae.

A 2002 paper included the Samydaceae in the family Salicaceae, a placement accepted in the APG III system onwards and also by Plants of the World Online as of March 2021. This placement has by no means been universally accepted.
