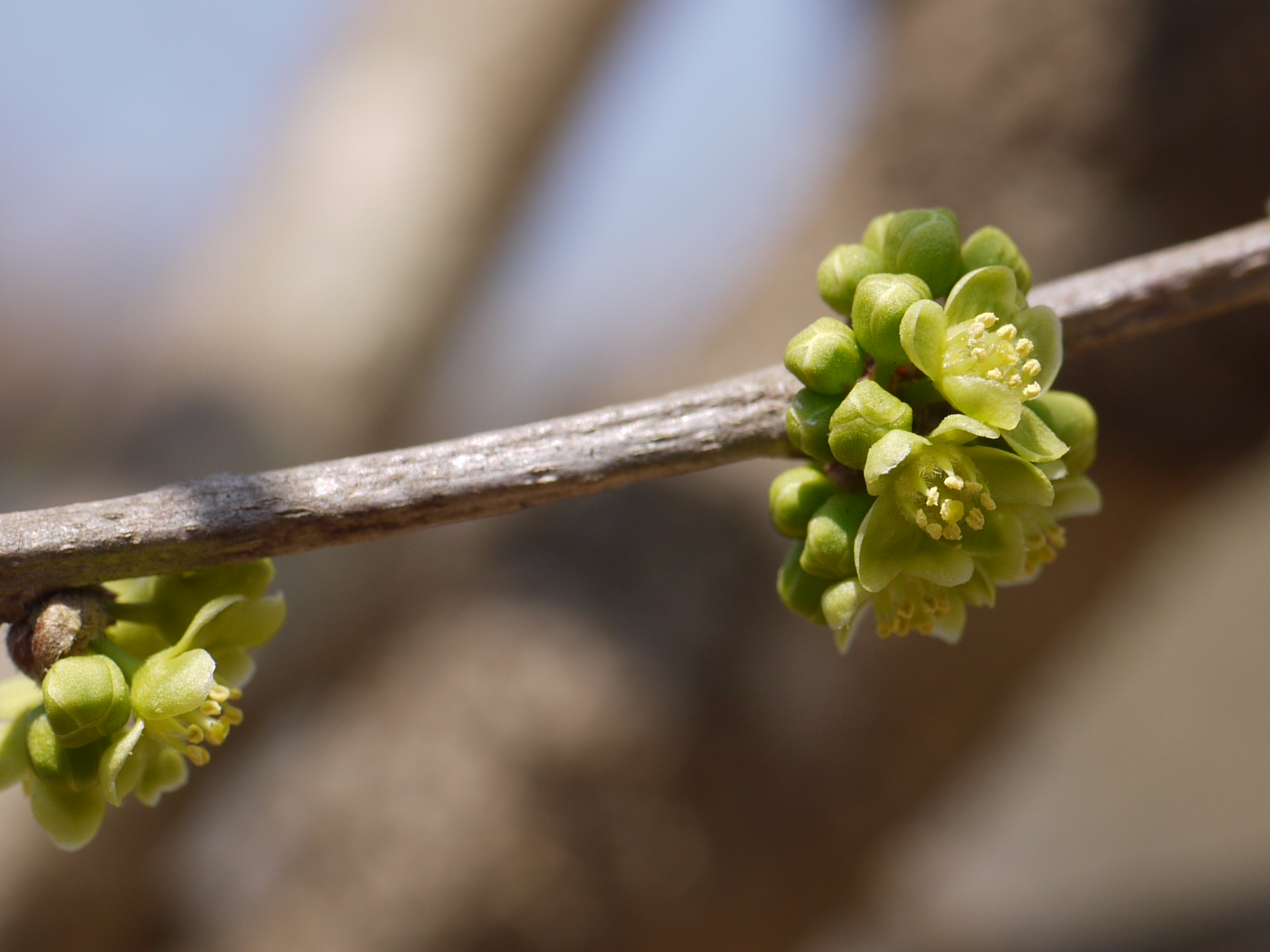
- Flowers
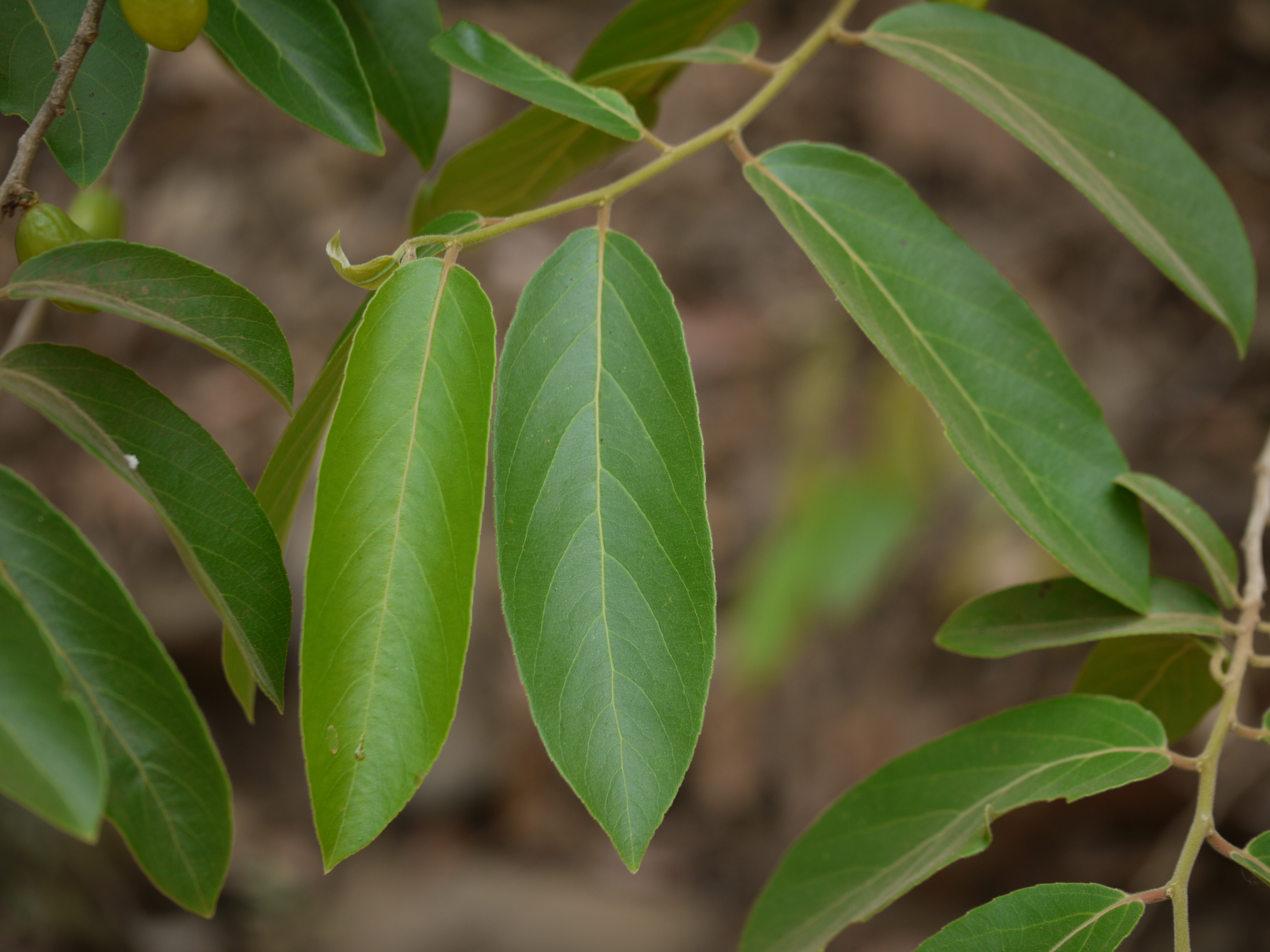
- Leaves

Conservation status
- Least Concern (IUCN 3.1)

Scientific classification
- Kingdom: Plantae
- Clade: Embryophytes
- Clade: Tracheophytes
- Clade: Spermatophytes
- Clade: Angiosperms
- Clade: Eudicots
- Clade: Rosids
- Order: Malpighiales
- Family: Salicaceae
- Genus: Casearia
- Species: C. tomentosa

Binomial name
- Casearia tomentosa Roxb.

Subspecies
- Casearia tomentosa subsp. reducta Verdc.; Casearia tomentosa subsp. tomentosa

Synonyms
- Homotypic: Guidonia tomentosa (Roxb.) Kurz; Heterotypic: Anavinga lanceolata Lam.; Bedousia aromatica Raf.; Bedousia malabarica Dennst.; Casearia anavinga Dalzell & A.Gibson, nom. illeg.; Casearia canziala (Buch.-Ham.) Wall., nom. nud.; Casearia cheela Royle; Casearia elliptica Willd., nom. superfl.; Casearia ovata Roxb., nom. illeg.; Casearia pauciflora Royle; Casearia piscidia Buch.-Ham. ex Royle; Guidonia canziala (Buch.-Ham.) Kurz; Samyda bazanica Buch.-Ham. ex Wall., not validly publ.; Samyda canziala Buch.-Ham.; Samyda piscidia Buch.-Ham. ex Wall., not validly publ.; Samyda pubescens Blanco, nom. illeg.; Samyda serrulata Blanco, sensu auct.

= Casearia tomentosa =

Species of flowering plant

Casearia tomentosa, commonly known as the toothed leaf chilla, is a species of flowering plant in the family Salicaceae, native to the Indian Subcontinent and Myanmar. It is one of 1,000 species that can be found in the Salicaeceae family.

== Description ==
The chilla is a short trunked tree that can grow to be 8 metres tall, and is considered to be deciduous. The entire plant is very bitter. It has a perennial life cycle.

=== Leaves ===
The leaves are simple and alternate. The shape can vary from lanceolate, ovate, and elliptical. The leaves mostly have an obtuse shape, with some being oblique. Many lateral veins are present on the leaf, surrounding the midrib. The leaves range from a light green colour to a darker vibrant green. The size of the leaves range from 5 cm to 12 cm long.

=== Flowers ===
The inflorescence of chilla are arranged in a axillary glomerulus. They are bisexual flowers, with both male and female reproductive parts. The flowers are a white with a slight green tint. There are no petals present, however there are 5 sepals that are approximately 3 mm long. There are 8 stamen in a row which are about 2 mm long. The flower has a superior ovary that has 3 carpals present, and a short style. The plant most commonly flowers between February and August. Pollination can occur via insects, self, or cross pollination.

=== Fruit ===
The fruit is an orange/red fleshy capsule with seeds in the middle. Juice from the flesh of the fruit is used to create a fish poison. Seeds can be self dispersed, via wind, birds, animals, or humans.

== Taxonomy ==
This species was first identified by William Roxburgh, a surgeon and botanist who identified numerous plants native to India. His work was published in Flora Indica, written while he was the head of the Calcutta Royal Botanic Garden. He began collecting plants in Madras, India with Johann Gerhard König. König learned botanical principles from Linnaeus, who was known as the founding father of modern taxonomy. Casearia tomentosa was first published in Flora indica in 1832.

=== Subspecies ===
The following subspecies are accepted

- Casearia tomentosa subsp. reducta – Sri Lanka
- Casearia tomentosa subsp. tomentosa

== Distribution and habitat ==
Casearia tomentosa can be found globally throughout Asia in India, Nepal, Pakistan, Sri Lanka and Malaysia. It can also be found in parts of Northern Australia. It is very commonly found in hilly areas.

Chilla prefers dry habitats and is commonly found in deciduous forests that have a maximum altitude of 900 meters. It is also able to grow along streams, although not common. It is vulnerable and susceptible to infection from a number of pathogens which include insects, powdery mildew, and mold.

== Uses ==
Casearia tomentosa has various phytochemical and pharmacological properties that are used in traditional medicine preparations said to be helpful for many illnesses. It is most notably sold to people who suffer from seafood poisoning, diabetes, ringworm, and snake bites. Other common names include Bhari, Maun, Churcha, Sonne bethe, and Kakoli based on the region where it is found.

=== Medicinal properties ===
Traditionally, the whole plant (root, stem, and leaves) are ground into a fine powder following drying. Combined with other ingredients such as honey, turmeric, buttermilk, water, or lime juice, the powder is sold to people who have pectic ulcers, edemas, fissures and cracks on the feet, colic pain, fever associated with malaria, tonsillitis, sunstroke, diarrhea, wounds, and bone fractures by herbal physicians. Adding the juice of the fruit to water causes the death of fish, as it turns into a toxin. The juice of the bark and root can be given to diabetics as it is hypoglycaemic. Seed oil of Casearia tomentosa is used in the treatment of sprains. The juice of the bark on the stem is also used to cure ringworm.

=== Phytochemical properties ===
The pulp of the fruit is both diuretic and purgative, whereas ethanol extract from the leaves have proven anti-inflammatory properties. Extracts from the leaf and bark of Casearia tomentosa have antimicrobial properties against E. coli and B. subtilis and antifungal properties against F. solani, as well as significant antioxidant properties.
