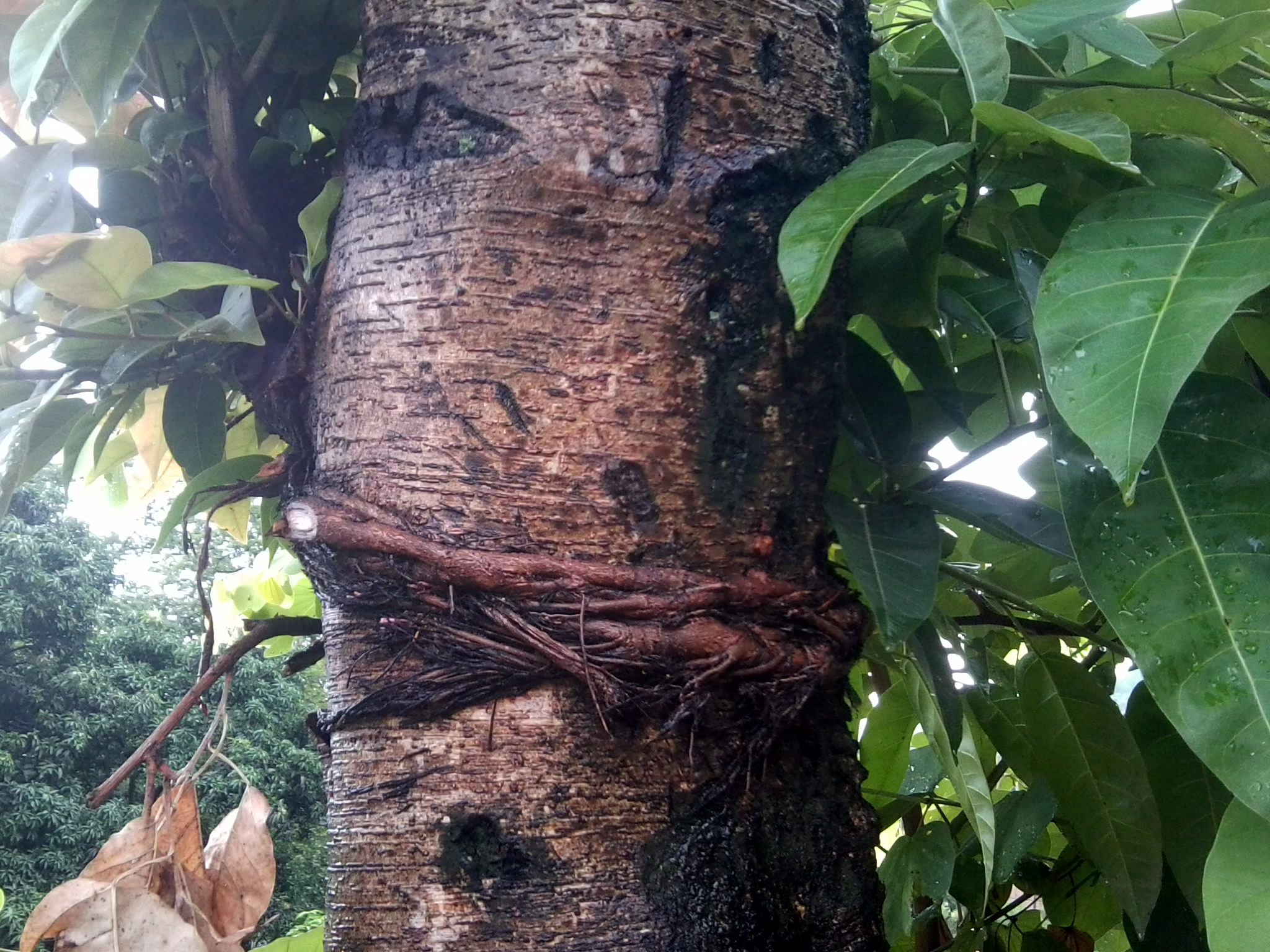
- Ficus lacor in Nepal

Scientific classification
- Kingdom: Plantae
- Clade: Tracheophytes
- Clade: Angiosperms
- Clade: Eudicots
- Clade: Rosids
- Order: Rosales
- Family: Moraceae
- Genus: Ficus
- Species: F. lacor

Binomial name
- Ficus lacor Buch.-Ham.

Synonyms
- Ficus infectoria Roxb., nom. illeg. homonym. post.

= Ficus lacor =

Species of flowering plant

Ficus lacor is a large evergreen tree of the family Moraceae. It is native to the Himalayas, India, Bangladesh, Myanmar, Laos, Cambodia, and Vietnam.

It is the city tree of Chongqing. It is a good fodder species. Ceremonial, edible and fodder. Young buds (Surulo) are used in making pickles. Seeds are tonic in nature and used in treatment of stomach disorder.

The species was described by Francis Buchanan-Hamilton in 1827.
