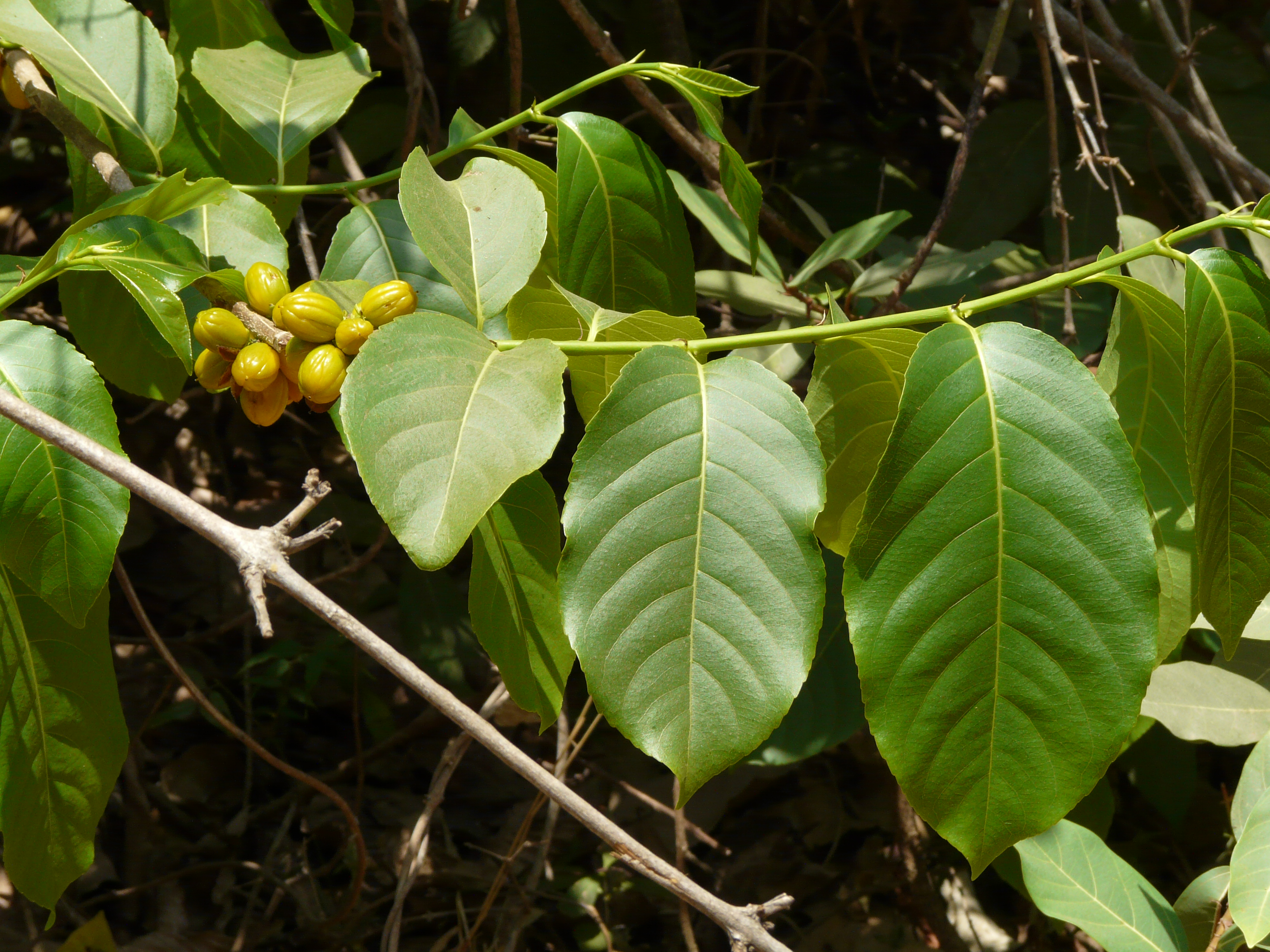

Scientific classification
- Kingdom: Plantae
- Clade: Tracheophytes
- Clade: Angiosperms
- Clade: Eudicots
- Clade: Rosids
- Order: Malpighiales
- Family: Salicaceae
- Genus: Casearia
- Species: C. graveolens

Binomial name
- Casearia graveolens Dalzell

Synonyms
- Anavinga ovata Lam.; Casearia alnifolia Royle; C. bourdillonii N.Mukh.; C. graveolens var. lintsangensis S.Y.Bao; C. hamiltonii Wall.; C. macrogyna Turcz.; C. ovata (Lam.) Willd.; Guidonia ovata (Lam.) Baill.; Samyda glabra Buch.-Ham.

= Casearia graveolens =

Species of plant

Casearia graveolens is a species of tree in the family Salicaceae, native to an area in Asia from Thailand to South Central China to Pakistan. The plant is used in fishing, fuel, medicine, as a source of non-edible oil, in construction and as food.

== Description ==
Casearia graveolens grows as a 3 to 15 m tall tree. Its trunk, with dark-grey rough, fissured bark with white specks, grows to a dbh of 20 cm when the tree is between 3 and 6 m. The green, smooth branches have grey-white patches, with glabrous branchlets, twig tips and terminal buds. The leaves are broadly elliptic to elliptic-oblong, 6–15 cm by 4–8 cm, with reddish brown dots and streaks visible at low magnification. The flowers are axillary glomerules, few to many flowered. Ripe seed capsule is orange-yellow, turning dark reddish-brown or blackish-brown when dry. Several seeds that dry to a pale yellowish-brown, ovoid in shape and around 4mm in size. The tree flowers in March and April in China, fruiting in September and November. In its western range, it may only grow to some 6m. On the Indian subcontinent, it is deciduous, flowers in February and March (mostly on leafless branches), it fruits from July to November, while the new leaves flush in June–July and persist until February.

== Taxonomy ==
The epithet of the species, graveolens, refers to the strong, offensive, smell of its foliage.

Casearia graveolens can be distinguished from other Casearia species by possessing narrowly lanceolate stipules, 5-10mm, caducous early, leaving a large conspicuous pale brown scar on young growth, the leaves possess 10–14 pairs of lateral veins, and possess dots and streaks, while being glabrous or glabrescent below. Another source, differentiating Casearia species in south-central Asia, uses the following characteristics to differentiate the species: Deciduous. The margin of leaves are crenulate, serrate or shallowly either, but infrequently entire. The sub-persistent stipules, clustered at the flushing stem, are linear or are lanceolate with an acuminate tip. The young leaves are very chartaceous, and turn blackish-green when dry, with the pellucid brown streaks and dots clearly visible at low magnification. Tertiary leaf veins are finely reticulate, while the stem is purplish-grey with conspicuous lenticels, white.

== Habitat ==
The tree grows in open forests in Cambodia, and in forests between 500 and 1800m elevation in China. In the Himalayas and sub-Himalayas it is common in deciduous forest at the higher elevation of 250-2500m. It has been recorded within rocky deciduous hardwood forest at low altitudes up to 600m. The tree is very common in valleys and ravines with subtropical forest in southern India and the Western Ghats.

== Distribution ==
It is found in Thailand, Cambodia, Vietnam, South Central China (Yunnan), Laos, Myanmar, Bangladesh, India (including in Andhra Pradesh, Assam, Bihar, Gujarat, Himachal Pradesh, Karnataka, Kerala, Madhya Pradesh, Maharashtra, Meghalaya, Odisha, Punjab, Sikkim, Tamil Nadu, Uttar Pradesh, and West Bengal), the Eastern Himalaya region, including Bhutan and Nepal, the Western Himalaya region and Pakistan. While the Flora of Pakistan states that it has not been recorded in that nation, Samarakoon lists three specimens from Khyber Pakhtunkhwa province in northwestern Pakistan.

== Vernacular names ==
- chrû:ëy phnôm, trâkiëk prëhs (="deer hip", Khmer)
- nuốt hôi, nuốt trôi (Vietnamese)
- xiang wei jiao gu cui, 香味脚骨脆 (Chinese).
- burey (Bonda, Odisha)
- kirambira (Gujarati)
- chilla, gilchi गिलची, safed-karai, phempri (Hindi).
- haniche, konje, bokara, hanise, killangi (Kannada, Karnataka)
- kissi (Kondh people, Odisha)
- pimpari (Konkani)
- anavananni, anavinga, cherukannan, chirakonna (Malayalam, Kerala)
- बोखाडा bokhada, mori, pimpari (Marathi, Maharashtra)
- mando, beniman, jamurdo, kokra (Odia)
- girchi (Ollari, Odisha)
- girchi (Parji, Odisha)
- chilhi (Surguja district, Chhattisgarh)
- girivudi, vasanga, veska, vaasanga (Telugu)
- sano dedri (Nepali)

== Uses ==
The fruits, stem bark and leaves of C. graveolens have been used to stupefy fish in Cambodia and elsewhere. The wood is regarded as excellent firewood in Cambodia. In India the plant is used in Ayurveda medicine for treatment of cancer and viral diseases. In some places in India the root paste is used to treat piles and the juice is given for jaundice.

Looking at how communities living close to each other have different names and uses for plants, Merlin Franco & Narasimhan recorded the different uses of plants by communities in Koraput and Malkangiri districts in Odisha, eastern India. While people in Kondh, Poraja (Parji-speakers) and Gadaba (Ollari-speakers) villages all use oil from the C. graveolens for non-edible purposes, the Bonda villages use it as an edible oil. Only the Kondh and Gadaba villages used the trees trunk in furniture and construction and only the Bonda people used the fruit as a vegetable.

In the Surguja district of Chhattisgarh, east-central India, people use the plant to produce types of beer. The root is one of a number of plant ingredients of a ranu, a Fermentation starter tablet for handia (rice-beer) and mahua (a fermented product of Madhuca longifolia var. longifolia corollas). The bark is also added to the handia rice beer, either to increase intoxication or to quicken fermentation.
