= Leaf scar =

Mark left after a leaf falls off a twig

A leaf scar is the mark left by a leaf after it falls off the twig. It marks the site where the petiole attached to the stem. A leaf scar is typically found below a branch, as branches come from axillary buds located above leaf scars.

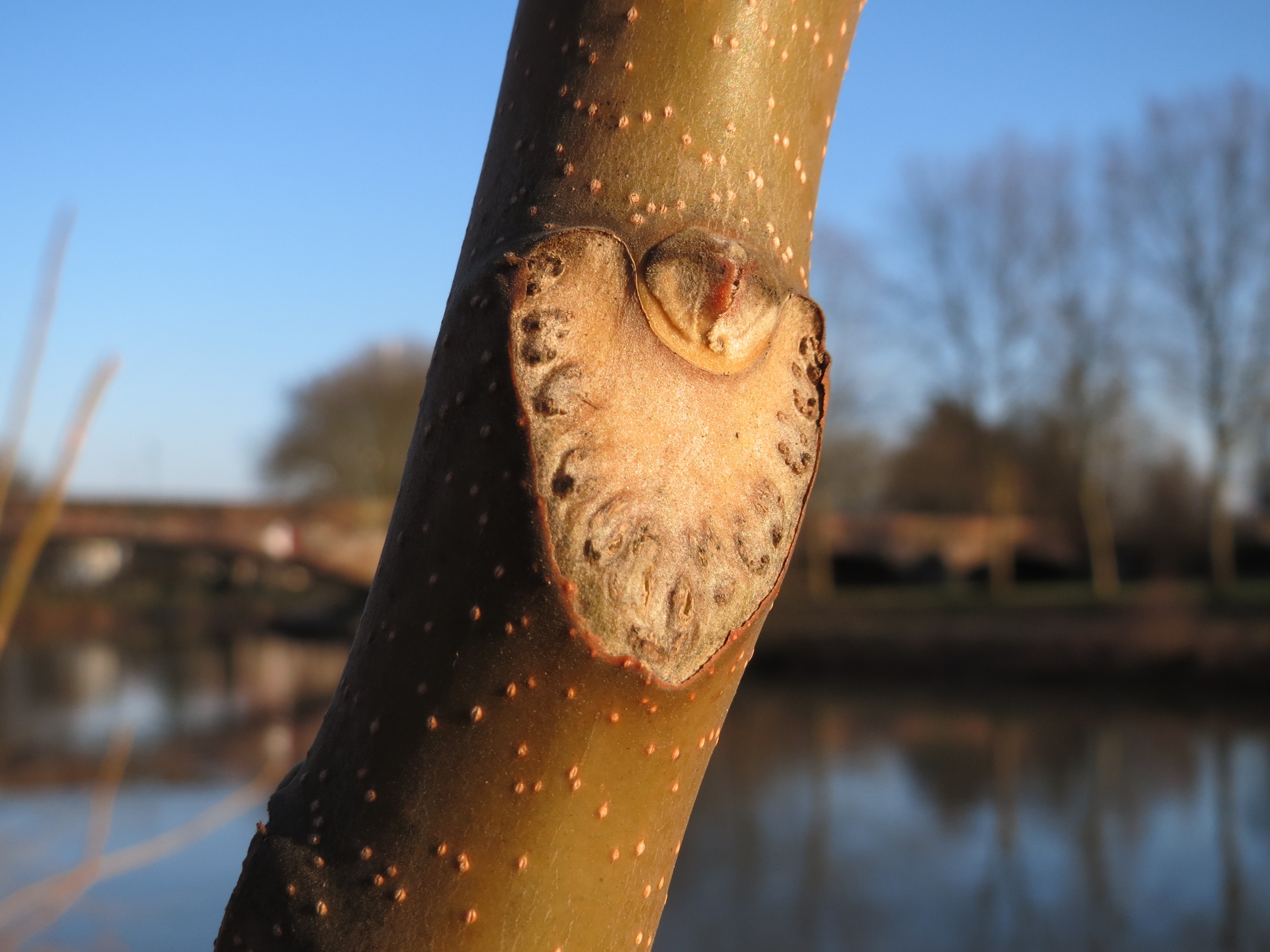
The leaf scar on Ailanthus altissima

== Formation ==
Leaf scars are formed naturally, often at the end of the growing season for deciduous plants when a layer of cells called the abscissa layer forms between the petiole and stem. The abscission layer acts as a point of cleavage and the leaf breaks off leaving a cleanly shaped wound that is quickly healed over with protective cork. Stipules may also leave their own scars if they are present.

== Bundle scars ==
Bundle scars are circular or barred regions within the leaf scar where bundles of vascular tissue that had connected the leaf and the stem broke off. The number of bundle scars in a leaf scar is sometimes used as an identifying mark as they are often consistent across a species.

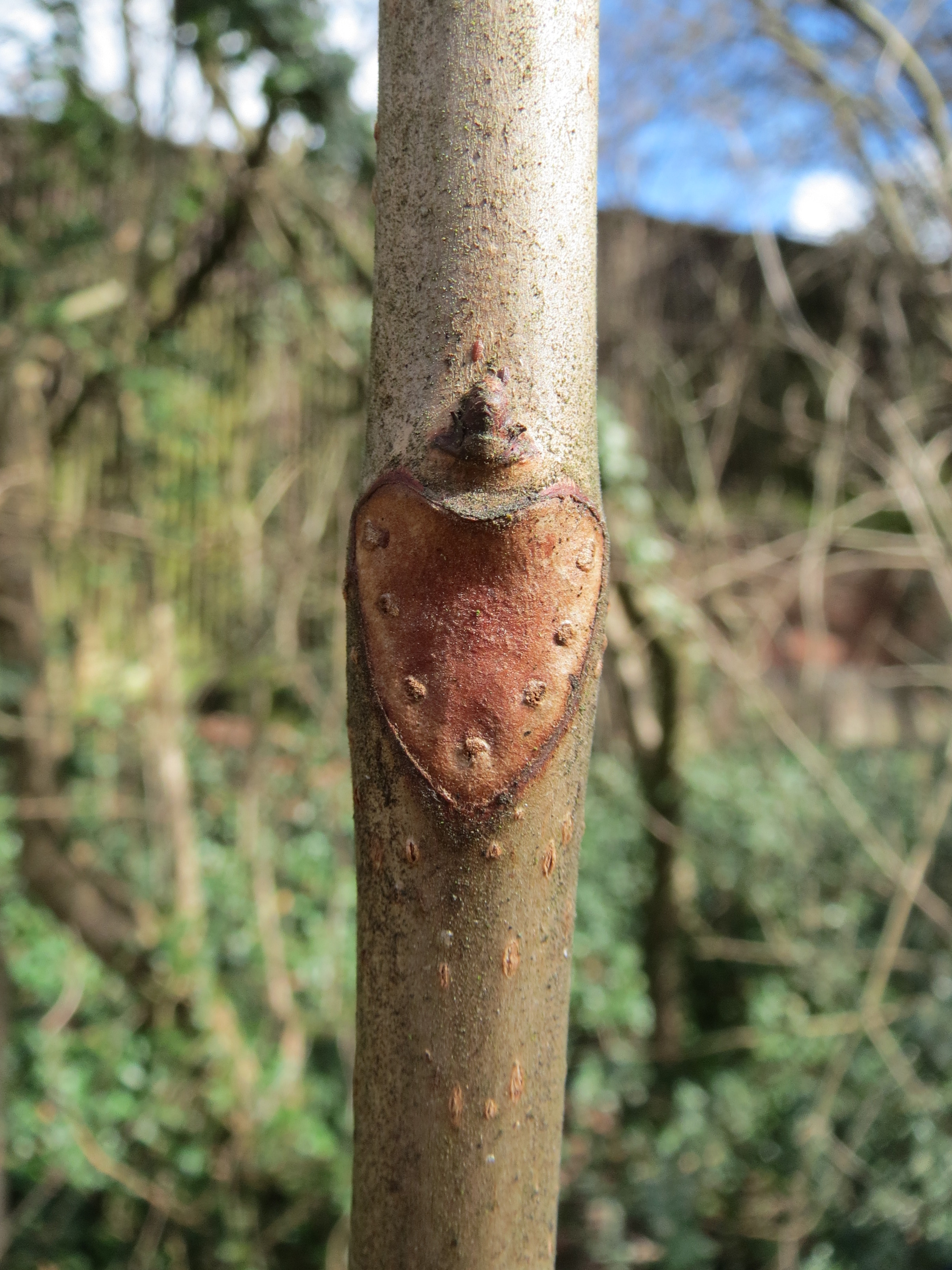
Aesculus hippocastanum leaf scar showing seven bundle scars

== See also ==
- Scar
- Scarred tree
