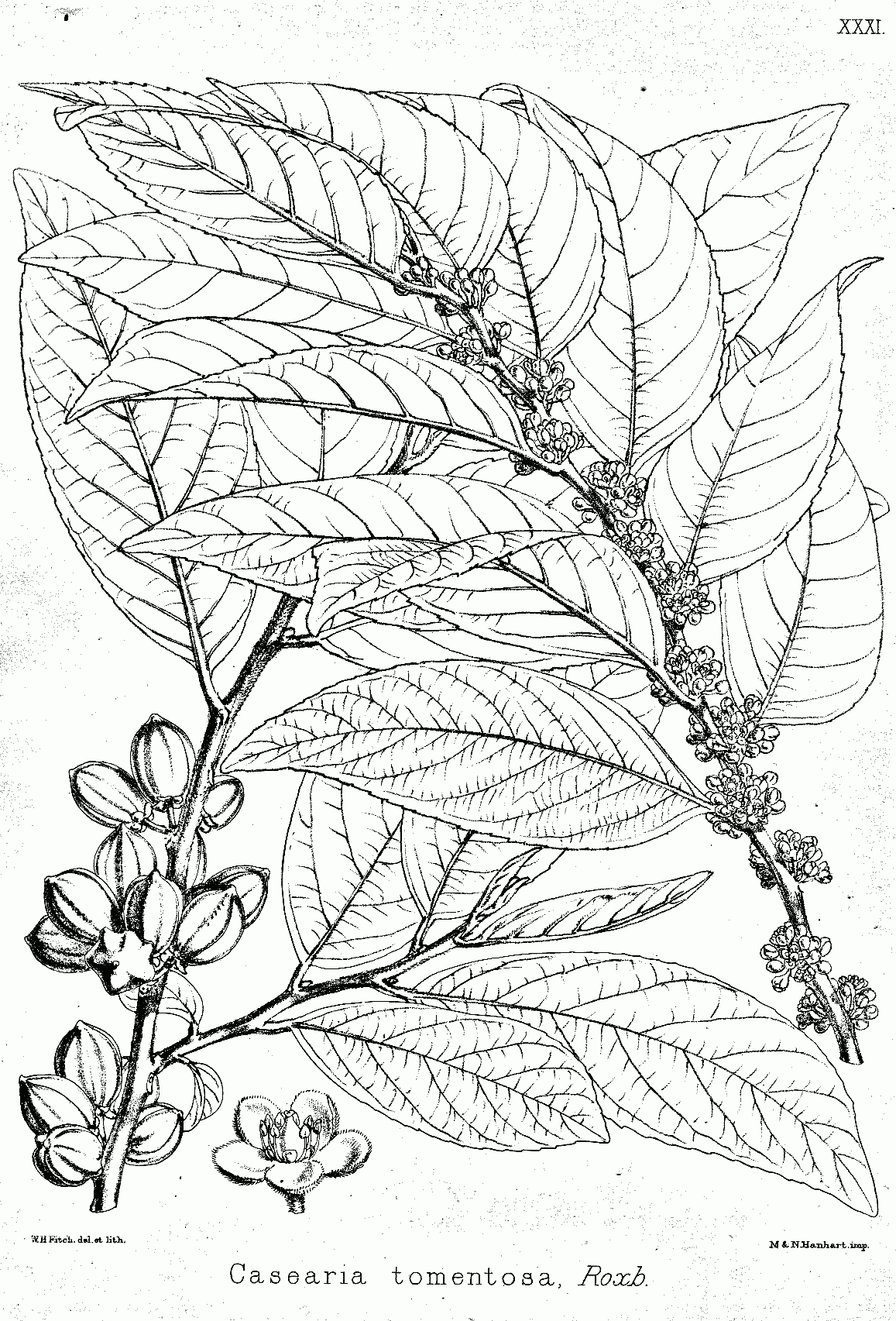
- Casearia tomentosa parts drawing

Scientific classification
- Kingdom: Plantae
- Clade: Tracheophytes
- Clade: Angiosperms
- Clade: Eudicots
- Clade: Rosids
- Order: Malpighiales
- Family: Salicaceae
- Subfamily: Samydoideae
- Genus: Casearia; Jacq.

Type species
- Casearia nitida (L.) Jacq.

Species
- ~252; see here.

Synonyms
- Synonymy: Anavinga Adans.; Antigona Vell.; Bedousia Dennst.; Bigelovia Spreng.; Casinga Griseb.; Celsa Vell.; Chaetocrater Ruiz & Pav.; Chetocrater Raf.; Clasta Comm. ex Vent.; Corizospermum Zipp.; Crateria Pers.; Euceraea Mart.; Geunzia Neck.; Gossypiospermum (Griseb.) Urb.; Guayabilla Sessé & Moc.; Guidonia (DC.) Griseb.; Guidonia P.Browne; Guidonia Mill.; Hecatostemon S.F.Blake; Helvingia Adans.; Iroucana Aubl.; Laetia Loefl. ex L.; Langleia Scop.; Lindleya Kunth; Melistaurum J.R.Forst. & G.Forst.; Mesterna Adans.; Moelleria Scop.; Neoptychocarpus Buchheim; Pitumba Aubl.; Ptychocarpus Kuhlm.; Sadymia Griseb.; Samyda Jacq.; Synandrina Standl. & L.O.Williams; Tardiella Gagnep.; Valentinia Sw.; Vareca Gaertn.; Wolfia Schreb.; Zuelania A.Rich.

= Casearia =

Genus of flowering plants

Casearia is a plant genus in the family Salicaceae. The genus was included in the Flacourtiaceae under the Cronquist system of angiosperm classification, and earlier in the Samydaceae.

They are sometimes employed as honey plants, notably C. decandra and C. sylvestris. The latter species is occasionally used as food by the caterpillars of the two-barred flasher (Astraptes fulgerator). Several species are becoming rare due to deforestation. Some appear close to extinction, and C. quinduensis of Colombia and C. tinifolia from Mauritius seem to be extinct since some time in the 20th century and about 1976, respectively.

== Selected species ==
- Casearia albicans Wall. ex C.B.Clarke
- Casearia arborea (Rich.) Urb.
- Casearia atlantica Sleumer
- Casearia barteri Mast.
- Casearia bartlettii Lundell
- Casearia coriifolia Lescot & Sleumer
- Casearia corymbosa Kunth
- Casearia crassinervis Urb.
- Casearia decandra Jacq.
- Casearia dodecandra (Jacq.) T.Samar. & M.H.Alford
- Casearia engleri Gilg
- Casearia flavovirens Blume
- Casearia flexula Ridl.
- Casearia gladiiformis Mast.
- Casearia graveolens Dalzell
- Casearia lasiophylla Eichler
- Casearia macrocarpa C.B.Clarke
- Casearia mannii Mast.
- Casearia mauritiana Bosser
- Casearia megacarpa Cuatrec.
- Casearia mexiae Sandwith
- Casearia nitida (L.) Jacq.
- Casearia praecox Griseb.
- Casearia quinduensis Tul.
- Casearia rupestris Eichler
- Casearia seethalakshmiae V.Suresh & Ambika
- Casearia sylvestris Sw.
- Casearia tachirensis Steyerm.
- Casearia tinifolia Vent.
- Casearia tomentosa Roxb.
- Casearia williamsiana Sleumer
- Casearia wynadensis Bedd.
- Casearia yucatanensis (Standl.) T.Samar. & M.H.Alford
