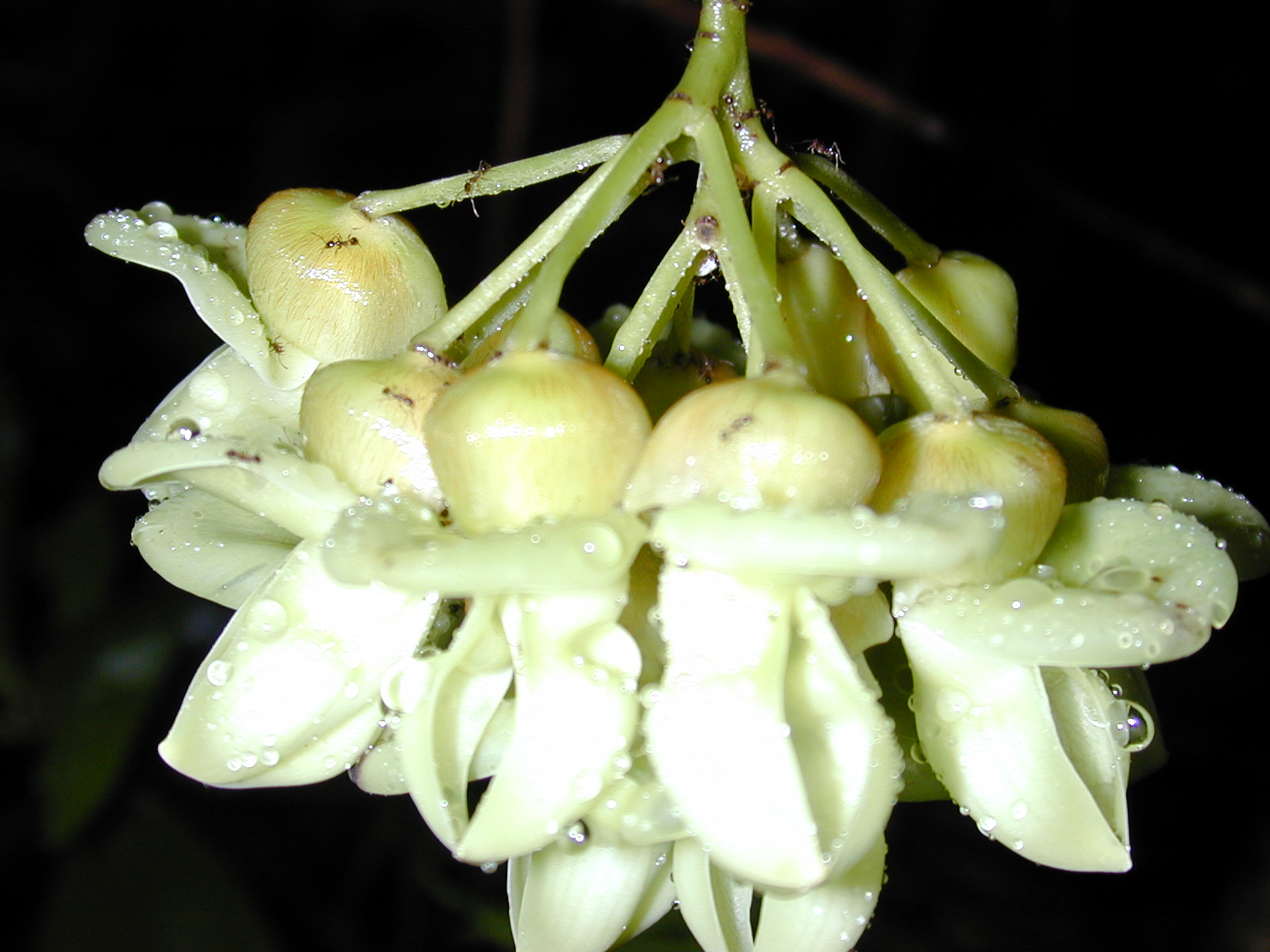

Conservation status
- Least Concern (NCA)

Scientific classification
- Kingdom: Plantae
- Clade: Tracheophytes
- Clade: Angiosperms
- Clade: Eudicots
- Clade: Rosids
- Order: Fabales
- Family: Fabaceae
- Subfamily: Faboideae
- Genus: Mucuna
- Species: M. gigantea

Binomial name
- Mucuna gigantea (Willd.) DC.

Synonyms
- Carpopogon giganteus (Willd.) Roxb. ex Lindl.; Dolichos giganteus Willd.; Negretia gigantea (Willd.) Oken; Stizolobium giganteum (Willd.) Moon

= Mucuna gigantea =

Burny bean

Species of plant in the legume family

Mucuna gigantea, commonly known as burny bean, burney bean, velvet bean or sea bean is a species of liana from the legume family Fabaceae. Its natural range roughly follows the perimeter of the Indian Ocean and includes Africa, India, Malesia, New Guinea and northern Australia. Many parts of the plant—in particular the new growth, flowers and fruit—are covered in fine irritant hairs.

== Description ==
Mucuna gigantea is a large woody twining climber with a stem diameter of up to 10 cm (3.9 in). It usually grows to about 30 m (98 ft) in length, although it may reach up to 80 m (260 ft). New growth is covered in orange-brown hairs, while mature parts of the stem are glabrous with dark, raised lenticels, and the stem may be irregularly shaped. The trifoliate leaves are arranged alternately on the stems, attached to the twigs by petioles up to 15 cm (5.9 in) long, and the petiole base is swollen into a pulvinus. The central leaflet is elliptic to ovate while the two lateral leaflets are oblique (asymmetric), and they measure up to 15 cm (5.9 in) long by 8 cm (3.1 in) wide. All leaflets have rounded bases and acuminate to apiculate tips, with 4–6 pairs of lateral veins either side of the midrib.

The inflorescence is produced in the leaf axils, and is a pendulous, umbel-like cluster on a long branched peduncle measuring between 8 and 25 cm (3.1 and 9.8 in) long. The individual flowers are held on short lateral stalks. Each flower has a cup-shaped calyx with two lips, clad in fine greyish hairs. The corolla lobes are white, pale-green or pale lilac; the standard is up to 3.5 cm (1.4 in) long, and the wings and keel slightly longer. Most parts of the inflorescence are clothed in fine pale hairs.

The dark brown fruit are oblong pods, covered in brown or golden irritant hairs and measuring up to 15 cm (5.9 in) long, 5 cm (2.0 in) wide and 2 cm (0.79 in) thick. They are almost rectangular in cross-section with short wings about 5 mm (0.20 in) wide at each corner. They usually contain 1 to 4 dark brown or black seeds which are disc-like but not regularly rounded, measuring about 25–30 mm (0.98–1.18 in) diameter by about 6–10 mm (0.24–0.39 in) thick. A very obvious hilum extends about three-quarters of the way around the perimeter of the seed. The seeds can be dispersed for long distances by sea currents, giving it a near pan-tropical distribution.

Germination in this species is hypogeal, the cotyledons remaining below the soil surface. The first true leaves are scale-like, and growth is very rapid, a height of a metre or more occurring in three weeks. The tissues are easily damaged, even the flowers turning black when injured.

== Taxonomy ==
This species was first described in 1802 as Dolichos giganteus by the German botanist Carl Ludwig Willdenow. It was transferred to the genus Mucuna by the Swiss botanist Augustin Pyramus de Candolle in 1825, and Mucuna gigantea (Willd.) DC. remains the currently accepted name. There were two more combinations for this taxon published (neither of which is accepted)—namely Stizolobium giganteum (Willd.) Moon by the Scottish botanist Alexander Moon in 1824, and Negretia gigantea (Willd.) Oken by the German botanist Lorenz Oken in 1841.

=== Subspecies ===
In a revision of selected Asian species of Mucuna in 1976, the Japanese botanists Hiroyoshi Ohashi and Yoichi Tateishi moved the formerly accepted species M. tashiroi Hayata, a Taiwanese endemic, to a subspecies of this taxon, namely M. gigantea subsp. tashiroi (Hayata) H.Ohashi & Tateishi. A number of other authors have also proposed subspecies for this taxon, however these are dismissed in a 2016 paper, leaving just ssp. tashiroi and the autonym.

== Distribution and habitat ==
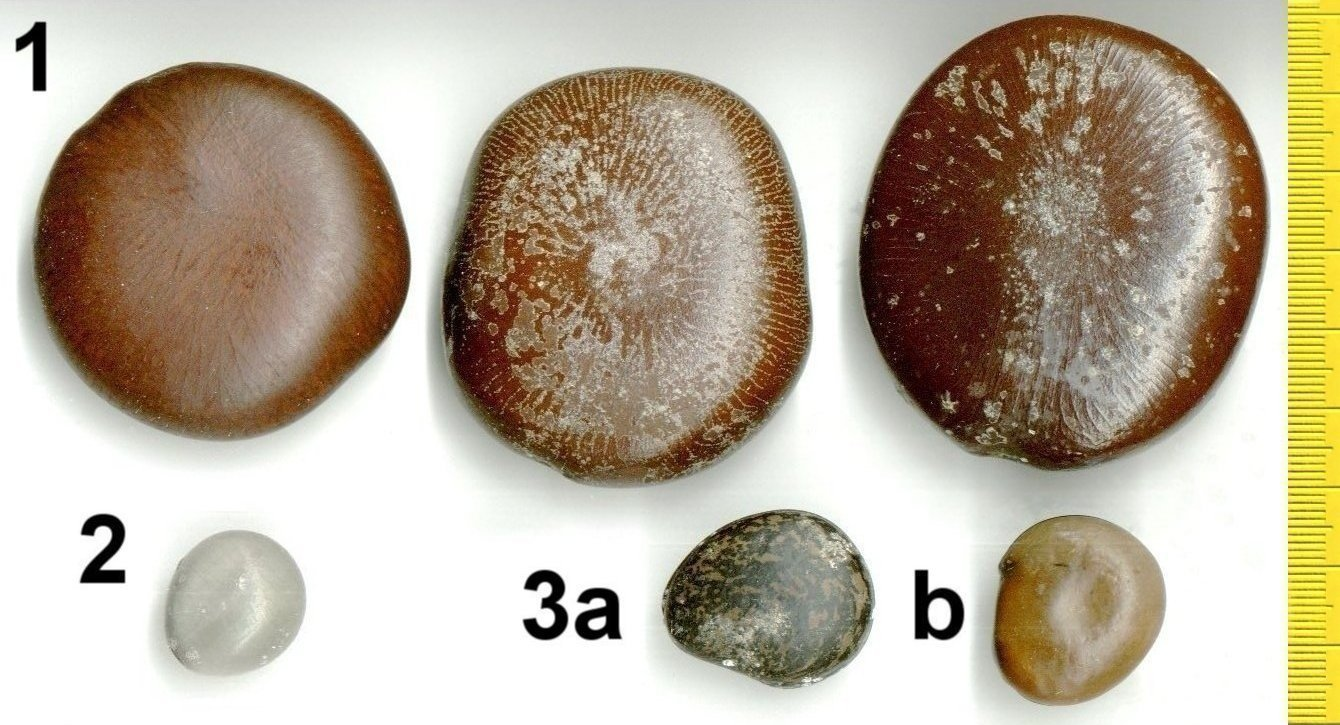
Drift seeds of three legume species found on the southern Mozambique coast: 1. Snuff box sea bean (Entada rheedei); 2. Grey nickernut (Guilandina bonduc); 3. a,b Varying colour forms of Mucuna gigantea

Mucuna gigantea occurs in tropical Africa, southwestern and southern Asia, and Oceania. In Africa its range extends from the Republic of Congo to Kenya, Tanzania and Madagascar. In Asia, its range includes India, Myanmar, Malaysia, Thailand and the Philippines. In Oceania it is found in New Guinea, the states of Western Australia, the Northern Territory, Queensland and New South Wales in Australia, and numerous Pacific islands.

The natural habitat of this species is beach forest, monsoon forest, and lowland and upland rainforest. In Africa it also occurs inland where it may be found close to large watercourses and lakes.

== Conservation ==
This species has a very wide distribution and thus may be treated differently in different areas. For example, in the Australian state of Queensland it is considered to be of least concern, however in the Indian state of Odisha it is classed as endangered. As of 4 November 2023 it has not been assessed by the International Union for Conservation of Nature (IUCN).

== Uses ==
After suitable preparation, the seeds are eaten in Kenya and India. Aboriginal Australians bake them on hot stones, and having removed the skin, grind them into flour, mix this with water, wrap the dough in leaves and further bake it. An extract of the root has been used against schistosomiasis and gonorrhea, and the powdered seeds have been used as a laxative. The intensely irritating hairs from the pods have been used as poison in Malaysia, and have been mixed with food for control of rats.

=== Nutrition ===
Analysis of the seeds shows 30.6% crude proteins, 9% crude lipids, 6% ash and 42.8% nitrogen free extract. The beans contain a relatively high proportion of the essential amino acids, leucine and isoleucine, and the minerals potassium, calcium, magnesium and iron are also abundant. Also present is the amino acid levodopa, which is used in the treatment of Parkinson's disease, but the beans also contain toxins, which can only be destroyed by lengthy soaking and boiling.

== Gallery ==
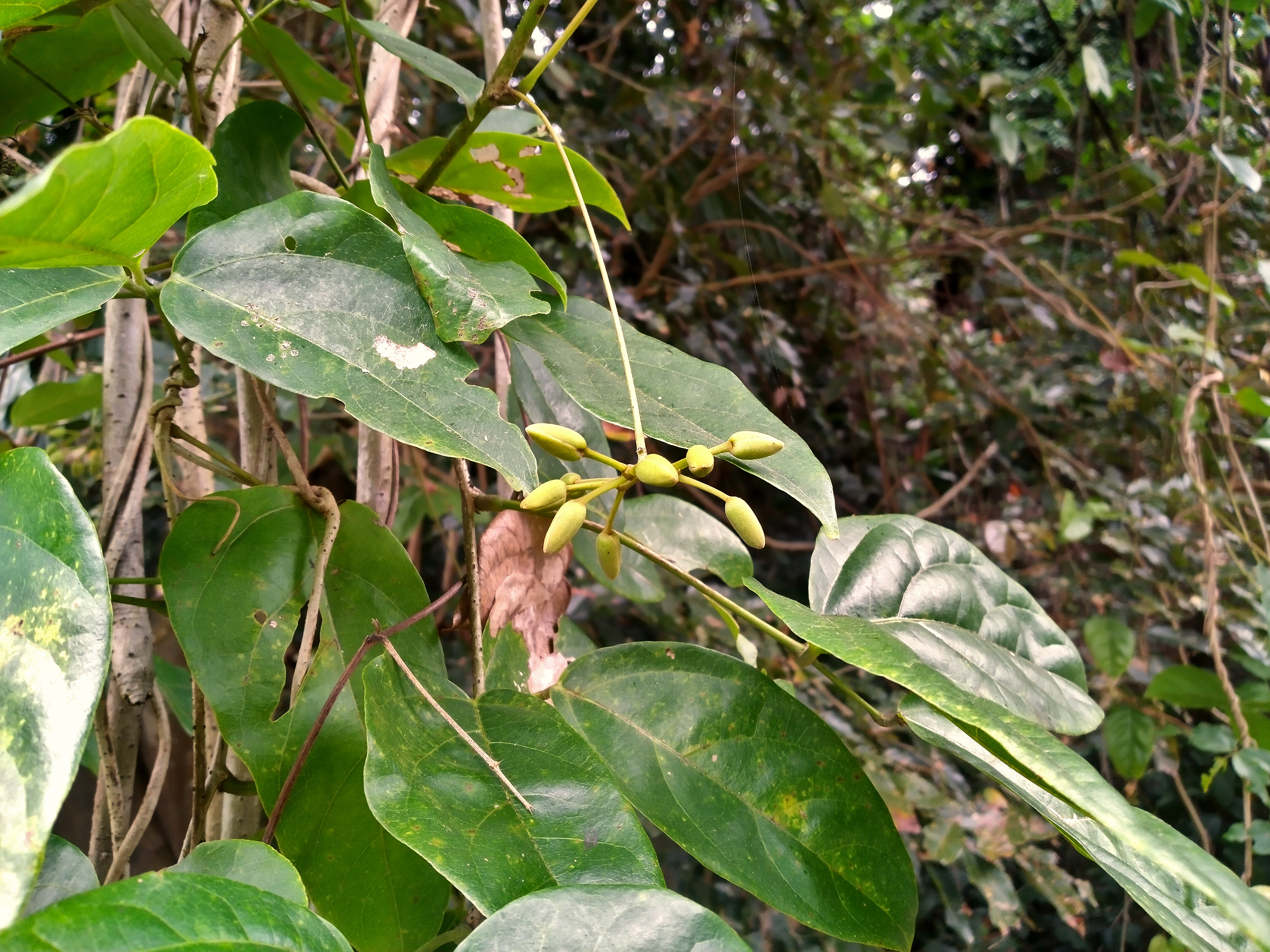
Flower buds

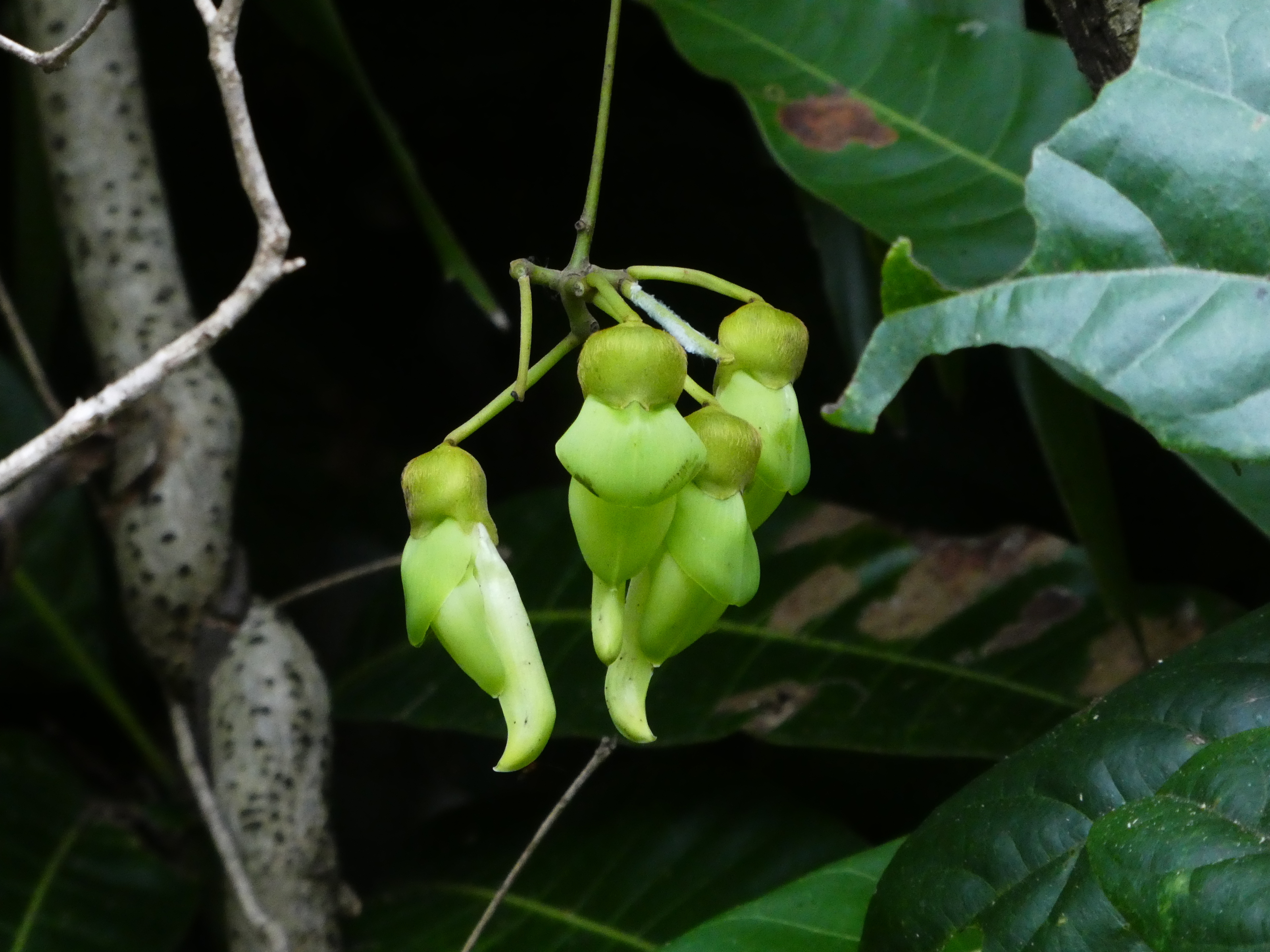
Inflorescence, with stem in background

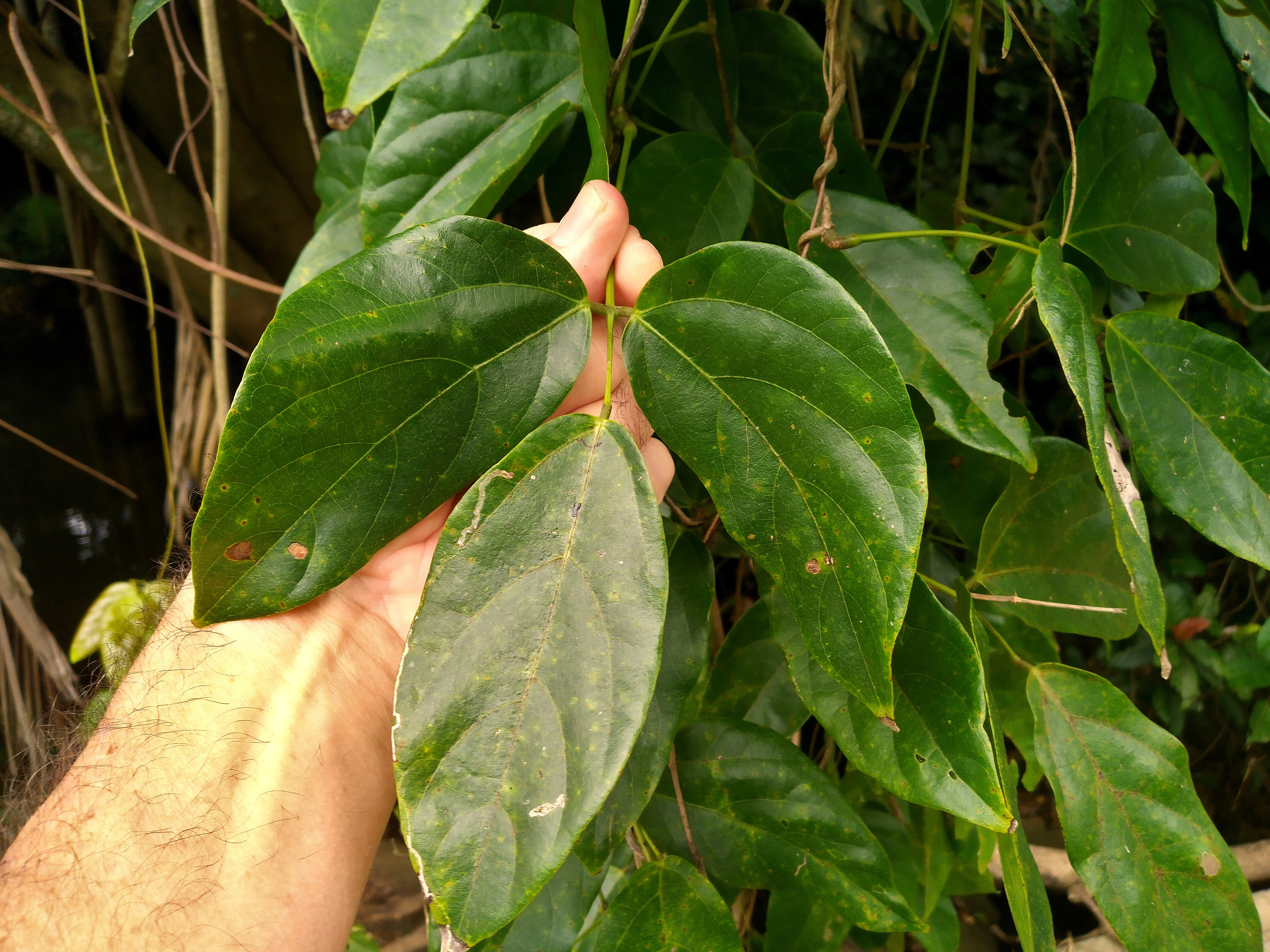
Trifoliate leaf

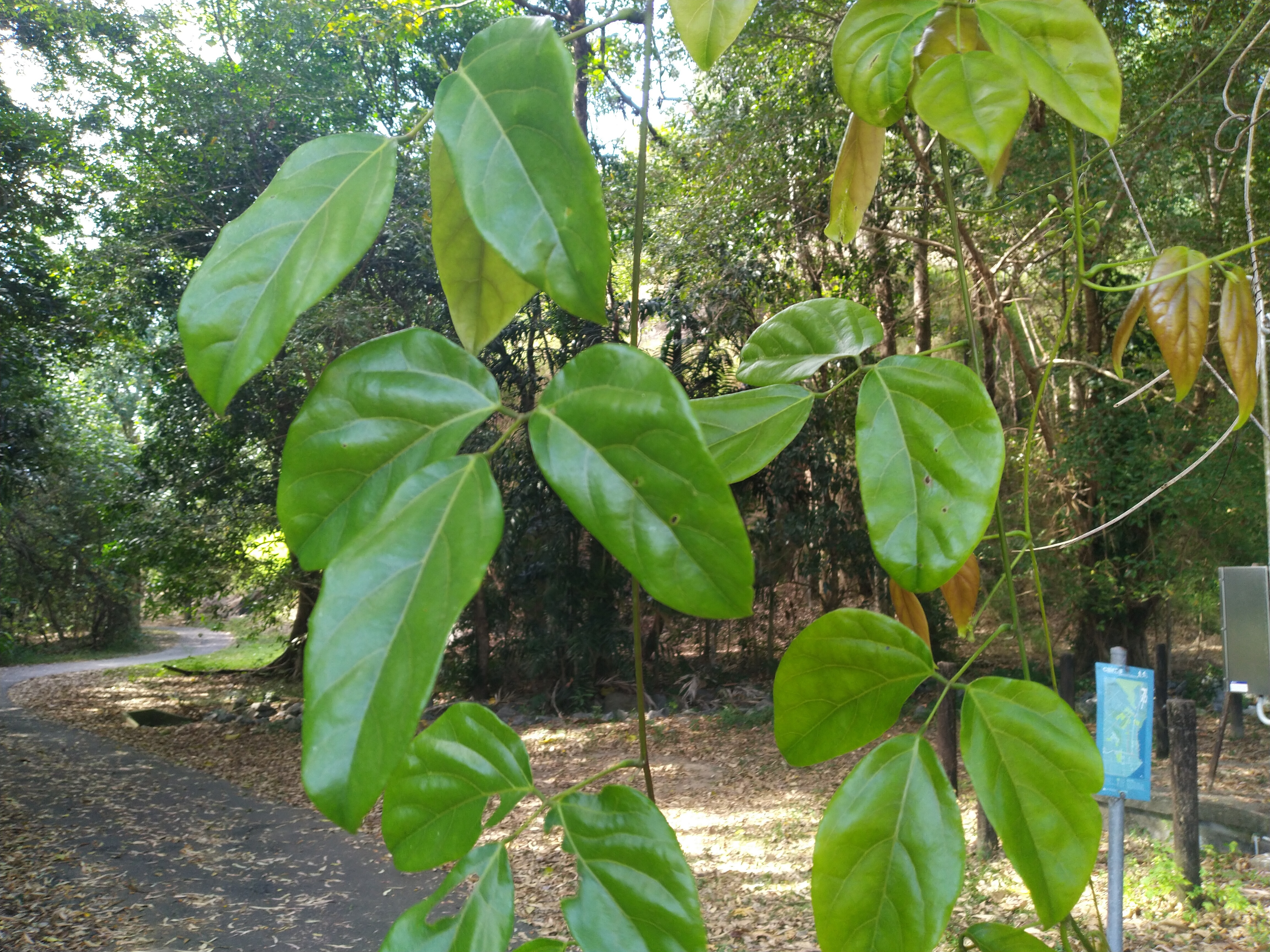
Foliage

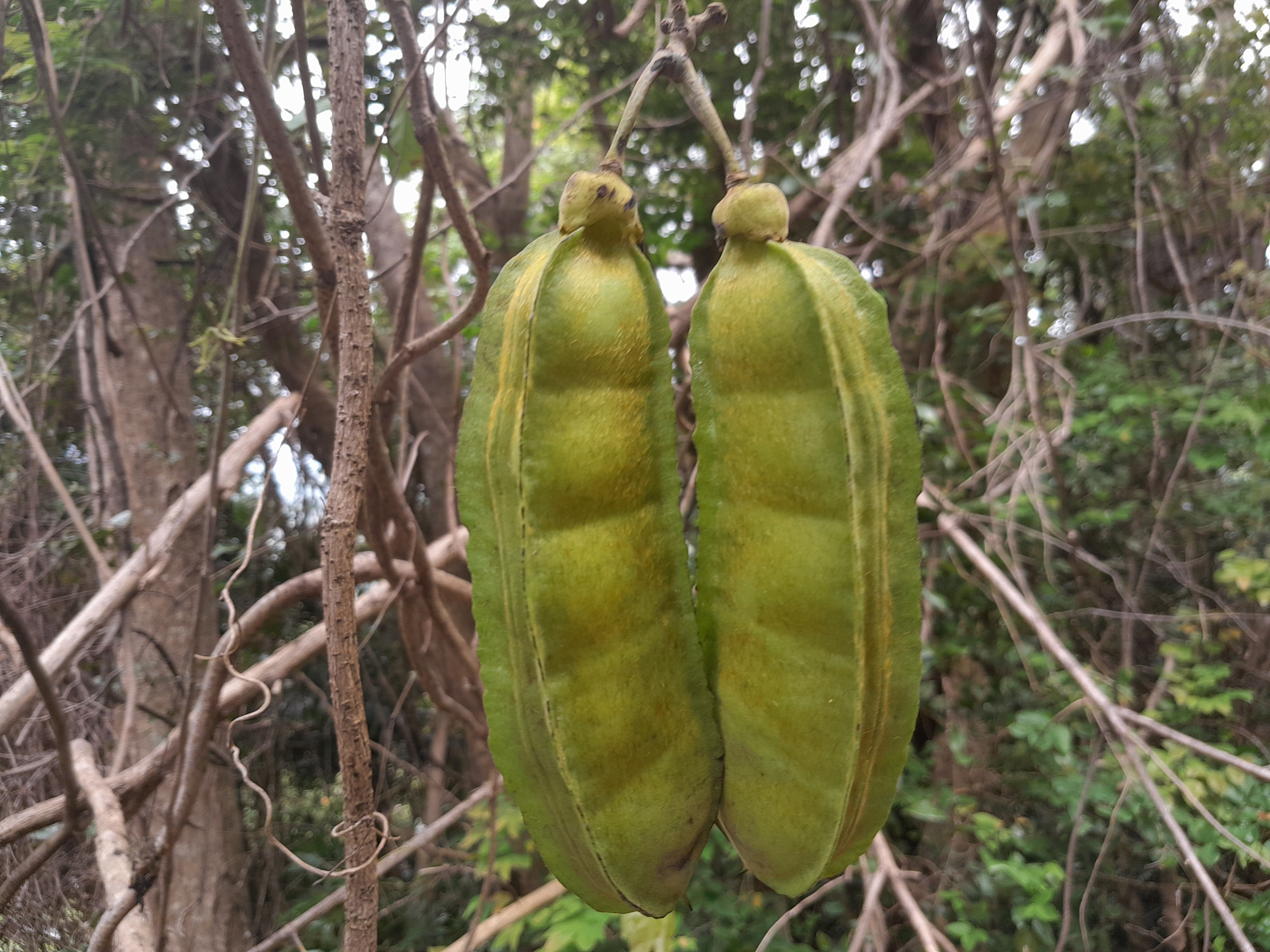
Immature fruit

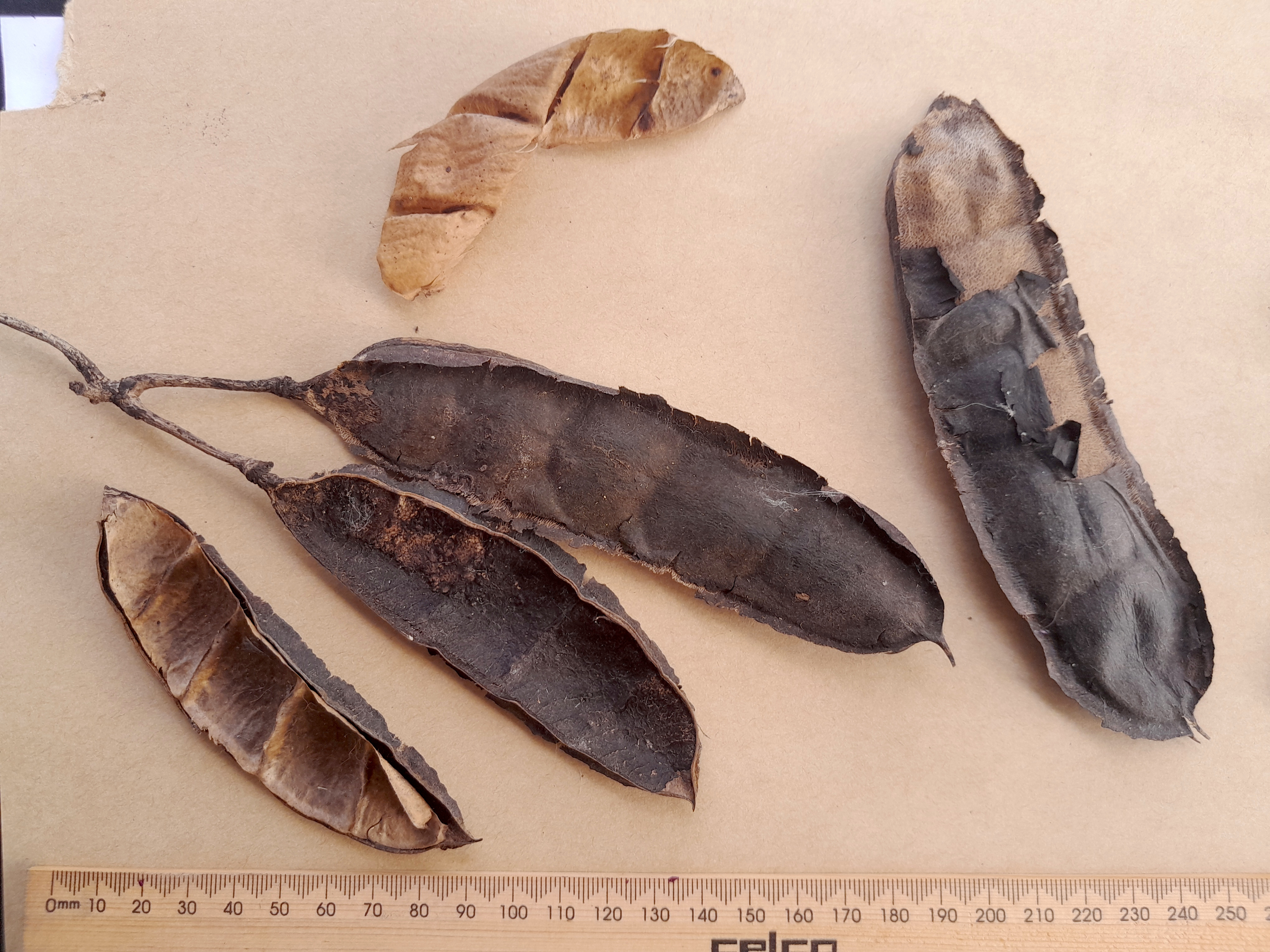
Old seed pods

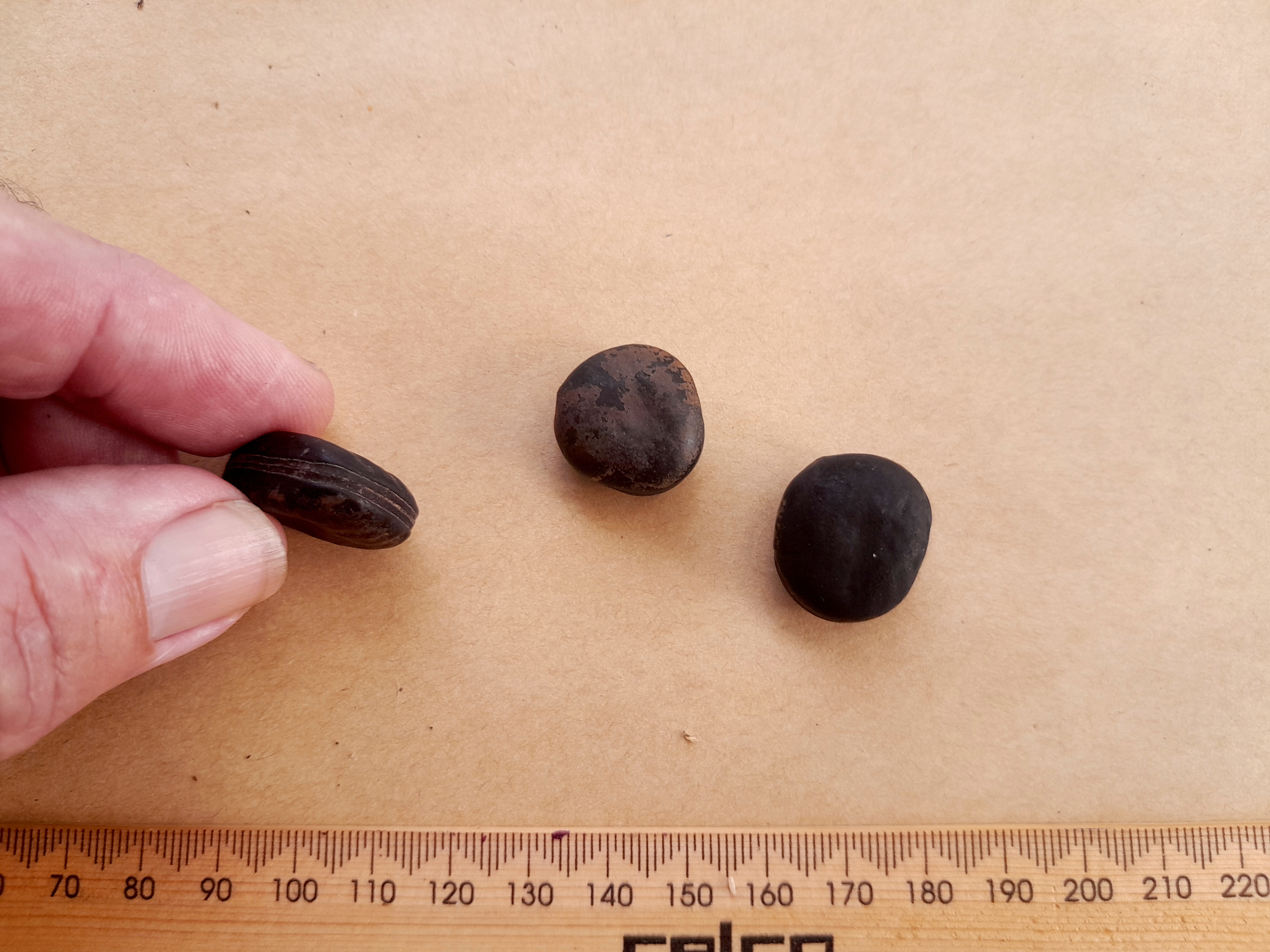
Seeds
