= Sea bean =

Sea bean may refer to:

- Drift seed, a seed of any of a number of tropical plants growing in coastal areas, the seeds of which are found floating upon ocean currents, by means of which the seeds are dispersed.
- Mucuna gigantea, a tropical species of liana dispersed in this way.
- When used in a culinary context, several different plants of the genus Salicornia which are used as vegetables
