= Drift seed =

Seeds and fruits adapted for long distance dispersal by water

Drift seeds (also sea beans) and drift fruit are seeds and fruit adapted for long-distance dispersal by water. Most are produced by tropical trees, and they can be found on distant beaches after drifting thousands of kilometres through ocean currents. This method of propagation has helped many species of plant such as the coconut colonize and establish themselves on previously barren islands. Consequently, drift seeds and fruits are of interest to scientists who study these currents.

In botanical terminology, a drift fruit is a kind of diaspore, and drift seeds and fruits are disseminules.

== Sources of drift seeds ==
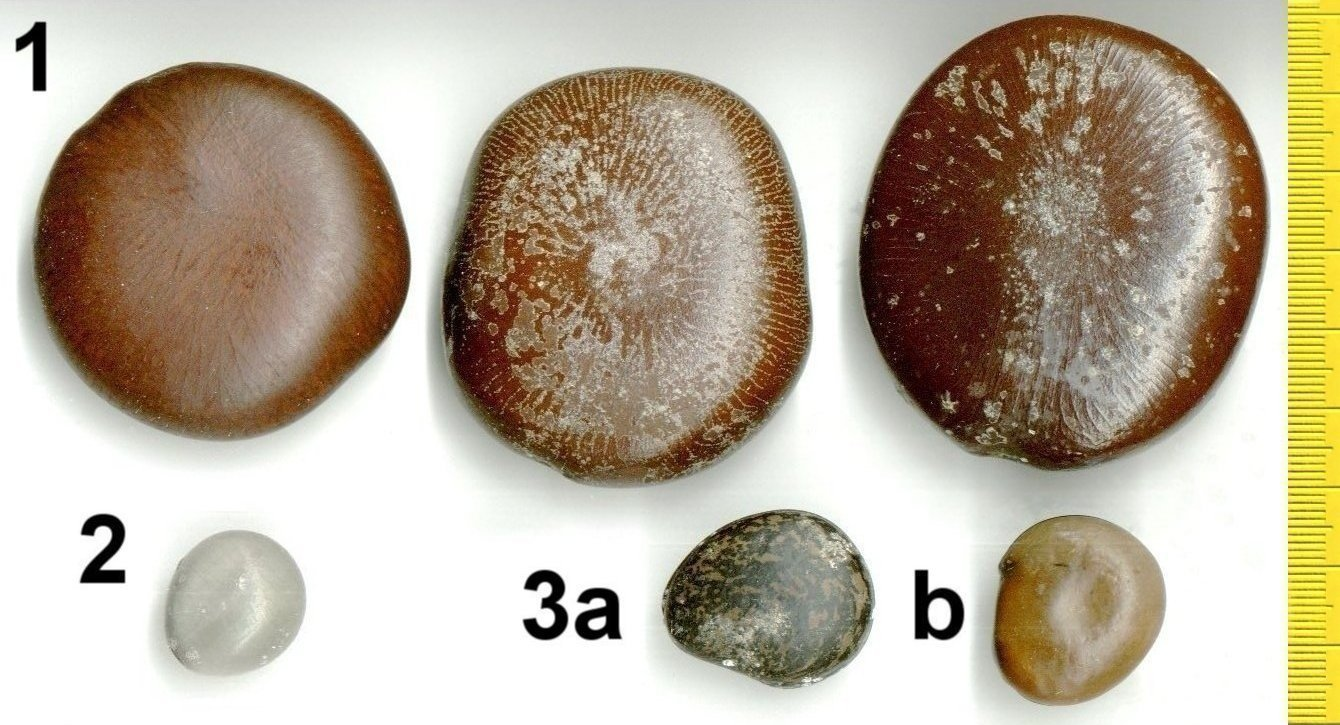
Drift seeds of three legume species found at Kanda on the southern Mozambique coast in May 2004: 1. Snuff box sea bean (Entada rheedei); 2. Grey nickernut (Caesalpinia bonduc); 3. a,b Colour forms of ox-eye beans (Mucuna gigantea)

- Caesalpinia bonduc – grey nickernut
- Caesalpinia major – yellow nickernut
- Carapa guianensis – crabwood (New World tropics)
- Entada gigas – seaheart, (New World tropics, Africa)
- Entada rheedei – snuff box sea bean, from the tropics of the Indian Ocean
- Erythrina fusca – bucayo (pantropical)
- Erythrina variegata – tiger claw (Old World tropics)
- Mucuna spp. – ox-eye bean, hamburger seed, deer-eye bean
- Lathyrus japonicus – beach pea (circumboreal and Argentina)
- Ormosia spp. – horse-eye bean, from the tropics
- Terminalia catappa – tropical almond, from the tropics of Asia

== Sources of drift fruit ==
- Barringtonia asiatica – box fruit, from Polynesia
- Cocos nucifera – coconut, from the tropics
- Grias cauliflora – anchovy pear, from the tropics of the Americas
- Heritiera littoralis – puzzle fruit, from Southeast Asia
- Lodoicea maldivica – coco de mer, from the Seychelles
- Manicaria saccifera – sea coconut, from South America
- Pandanus spp. – screw pines, from the Old World tropics

== Research ==
Enthusiasts founded an annual convention in 1996, the International Sea-bean Symposium, dedicated to the display, study, and dissemination of information concerning drift seeds and other flotsam.

Drift seeds and drift fruits

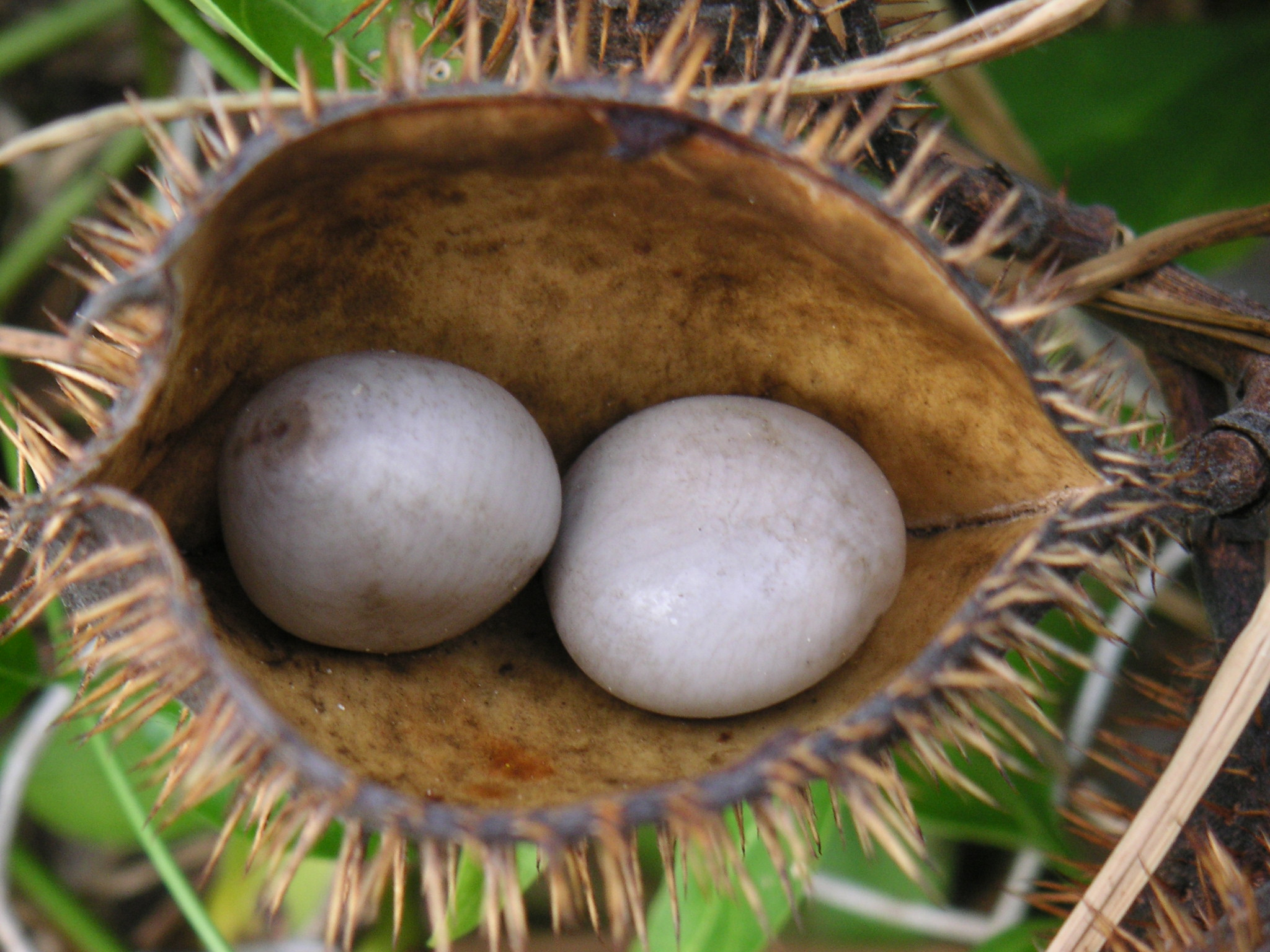
Nickernuts in fruit capsule

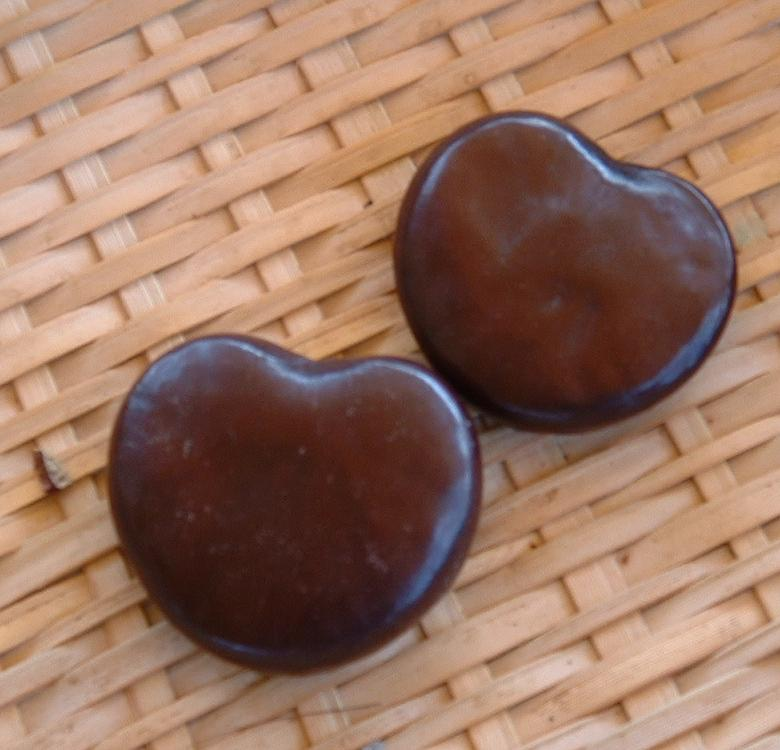
Seaheart seeds

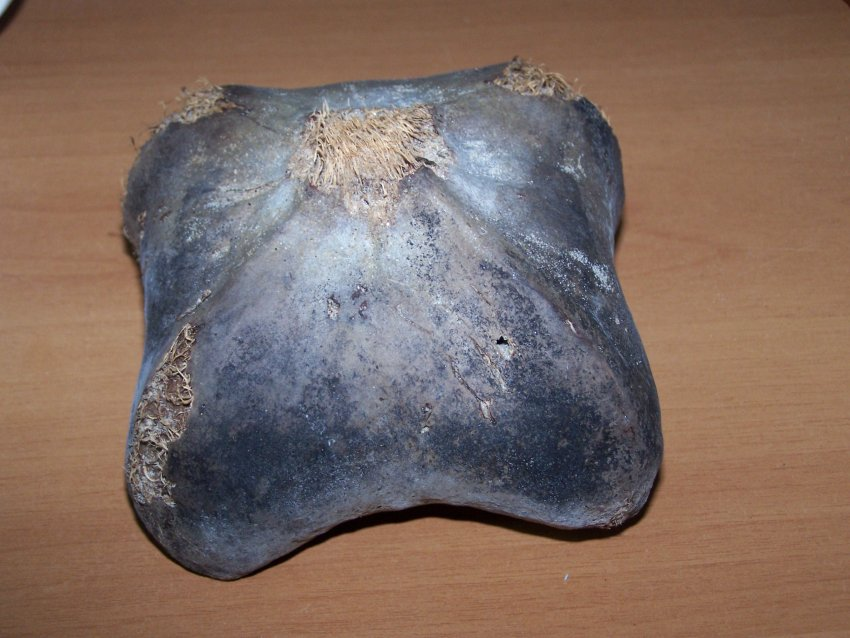
Box fruit found washed up on a beach at Mnazi Bay, Tanzania, December 2006

Puzzle fruit found washed up on a beach at Mnazi Bay, December 2006
