= Eaglestone =

Eaglestone may refer to:

- Eaglestones or Aetites (Latin) are hollow geode stones, once with a reputation for protection in child birth and other properties
- a nickname for the large seeds of the tropical nickernut climbing vine
- Clach an Tiompain, Pictish standing stone called the Eagle Stone

Places

- Eaglestone, Milton Keynes, England

People

- Phil Eaglestone, born 1982, Irish international cricketer
- Robin Eaglestone, born 1976, British musician
