= Melchior Wieland =

Prussian botanist and physician

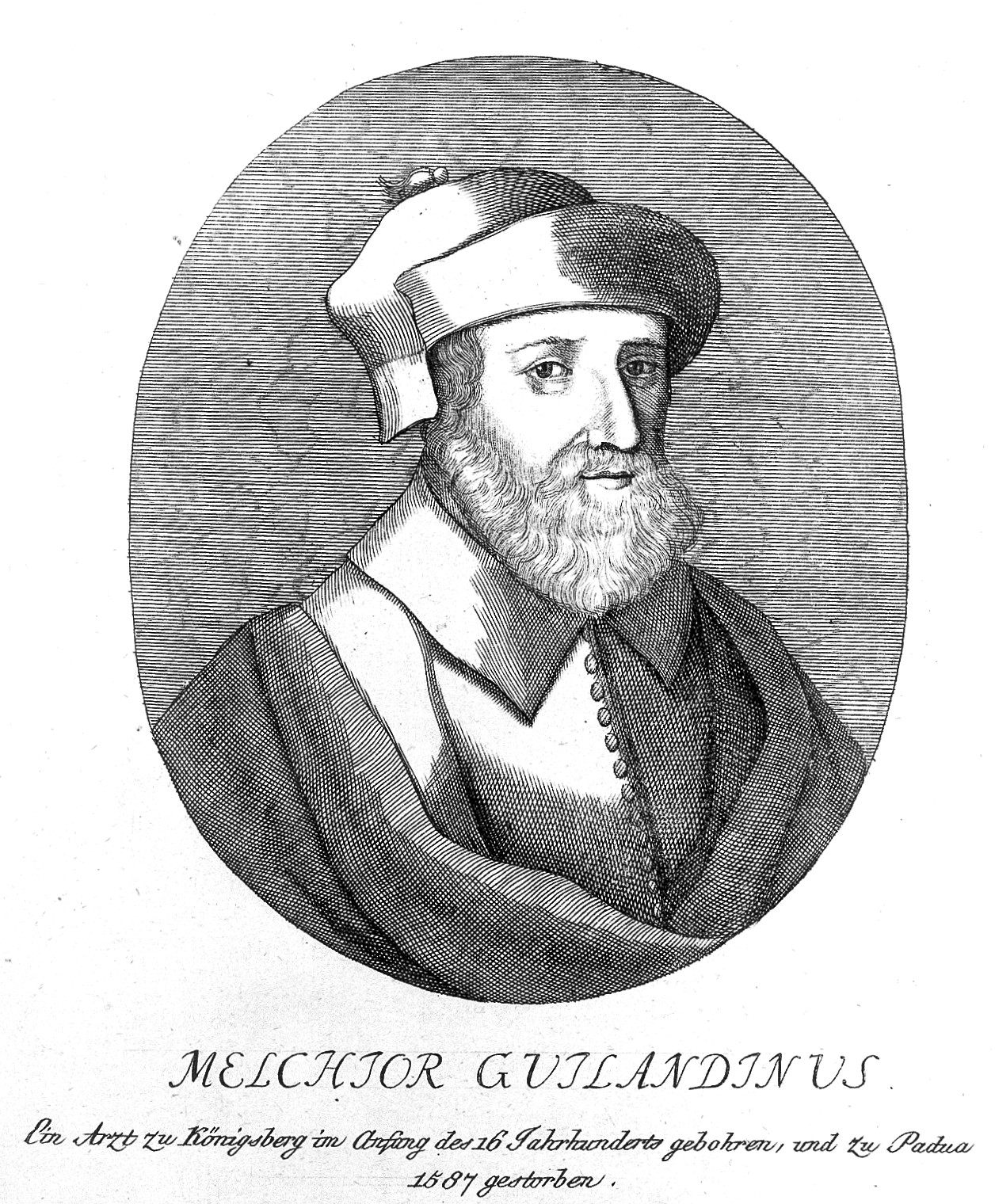

Melchior Wieland Latinized as Melchior Guilandinus with the Italian form Melchiorre Guilandino (c. 1520 – 25 December 1589) was a Prussian botanist and physician who worked in Padua.

Wieland was born in Königsberg and was educated at the University of Königsberg after which he moved to Italy. He sold herbs and later travelled through Asia into Egypt with letters of introduction from Senator Marino Cavalli of Padua. His ship was captured by Algerian pirates at Cagliari and employed as a galley slave. He was returned to Genoa with his ransom paid by his friend Gabriele Falloppio and then moved to Venice. In 1561 he became director of the Padua botanical garden and taught pharmacognosy. He is known mostly from his letters to Falloppio, Ulisse Aldrovandi, and had a bitter feud with Pietro Andrea Mattioli. His detractor Mattioli seems to have been angered by communications between Wieland and Conrad Gessner. Mattioli claimed that Wieland was the illegitimate son of a priest and a prostitute and Mattioli was expelled from his university for causing riots. Wieland bequeathed his books to the library at San Marco and is buried at the Basilica of St Anthony at Padua beside his friend Gabriele Fallopio. Linnaeus named the plant genus Guilandina after him. Prospero Alpini was a student of his.
