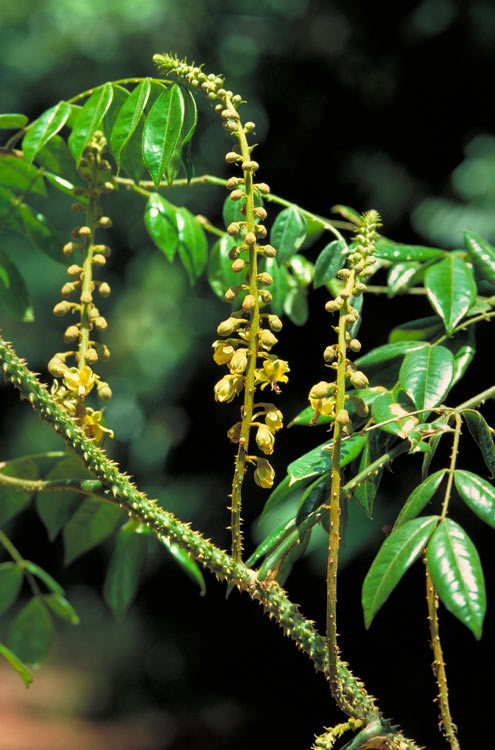
- Flowering

Conservation status
- Least Concern (NCA)

Scientific classification
- Kingdom: Plantae
- Clade: Tracheophytes
- Clade: Angiosperms
- Clade: Eudicots
- Clade: Rosids
- Order: Fabales
- Family: Fabaceae
- Subfamily: Caesalpinioideae
- Genus: Guilandina
- Species: G. robusta

Binomial name
- Guilandina robusta G.P.Lewis

Synonyms
- Caesalpinia robusta (C.T.White) Pedley; Mezoneuron robustum C.T.White

= Guilandina robusta =

Giant mother-in-law vine

Species of flowering plant

Guilandina robusta, commonly known as giant mother-in-law vine, is a species of climbing plant in the pea family Fabaceae. It is found only in the Wet Tropics bioregion of Queensland, Australia.

== Conservation ==
This species is listed as least concern under the Queensland Government's Nature Conservation Act. As of 6 April 2025, it has not been assessed by the International Union for Conservation of Nature (IUCN).
