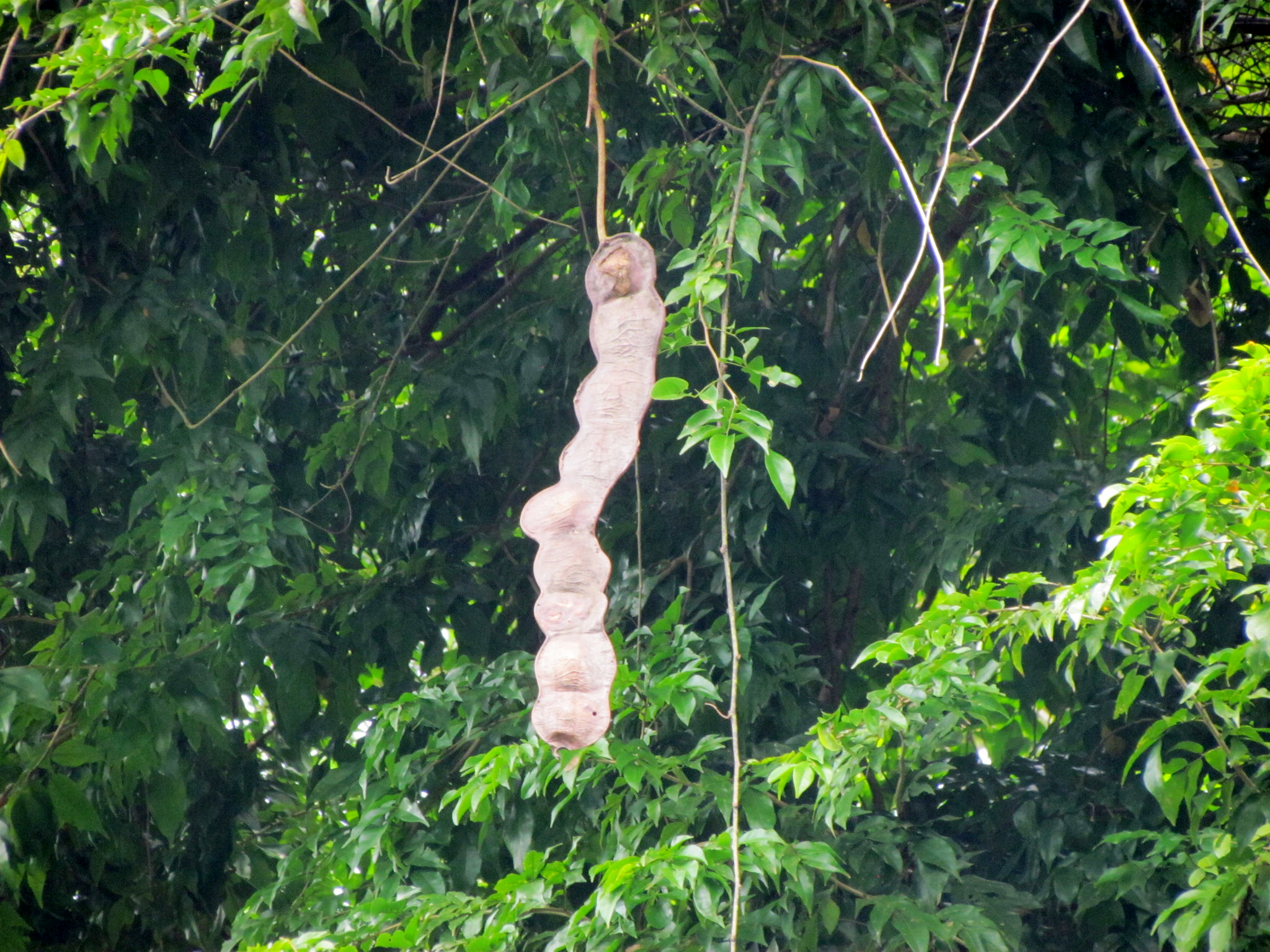
- Seed pod, Parque Ecológico Jaguaroundi, Veracruz, Mexico

Scientific classification
- Kingdom: Plantae
- Clade: Embryophytes
- Clade: Tracheophytes
- Clade: Spermatophytes
- Clade: Angiosperms
- Clade: Eudicots
- Clade: Rosids
- Order: Fabales
- Family: Fabaceae
- Subfamily: Caesalpinioideae
- Clade: Mimosoid clade
- Genus: Entada
- Species: E. gigas

Binomial name
- Entada gigas (L.) Fawc. & Rendle

Synonyms
- Entada gigas subsp. planoseminata (De Wild.) Baker f.; Entada gigas subsp. rectocarpa (De Wild.) Baker f.; Entada gigas subsp. umbonata (De Wild.) Baker f.; Entada gigalobium DC.; Entada planoseminata (De Wild.) G.C.C.Gilbert & Boutique; Entada scandens (L.) Benth.; Entada scandens subsp. planoseminata De Wild.; Entada scandens subsp. rectocarpa De Wild.; Entada scandens subsp. umbonata De Wild.; Entada umbonata (De Wild.) G.C.C.Gilbert & Boutique; Mimosa gigas L.; Mimosa scandens L.

= Entada gigas =

Species of legume

Entada gigas, commonly known as the monkey-ladder, sea bean, cœur de la mer or sea heart, is a species of flowering liana in the pea family, Fabaceae, subfamily Mimosoideae. It is native to Central America, the Caribbean, northern South America, and Africa. It is notable for having the largest seedpods in the Fabaceae.

== Description ==
=== General characteristics ===
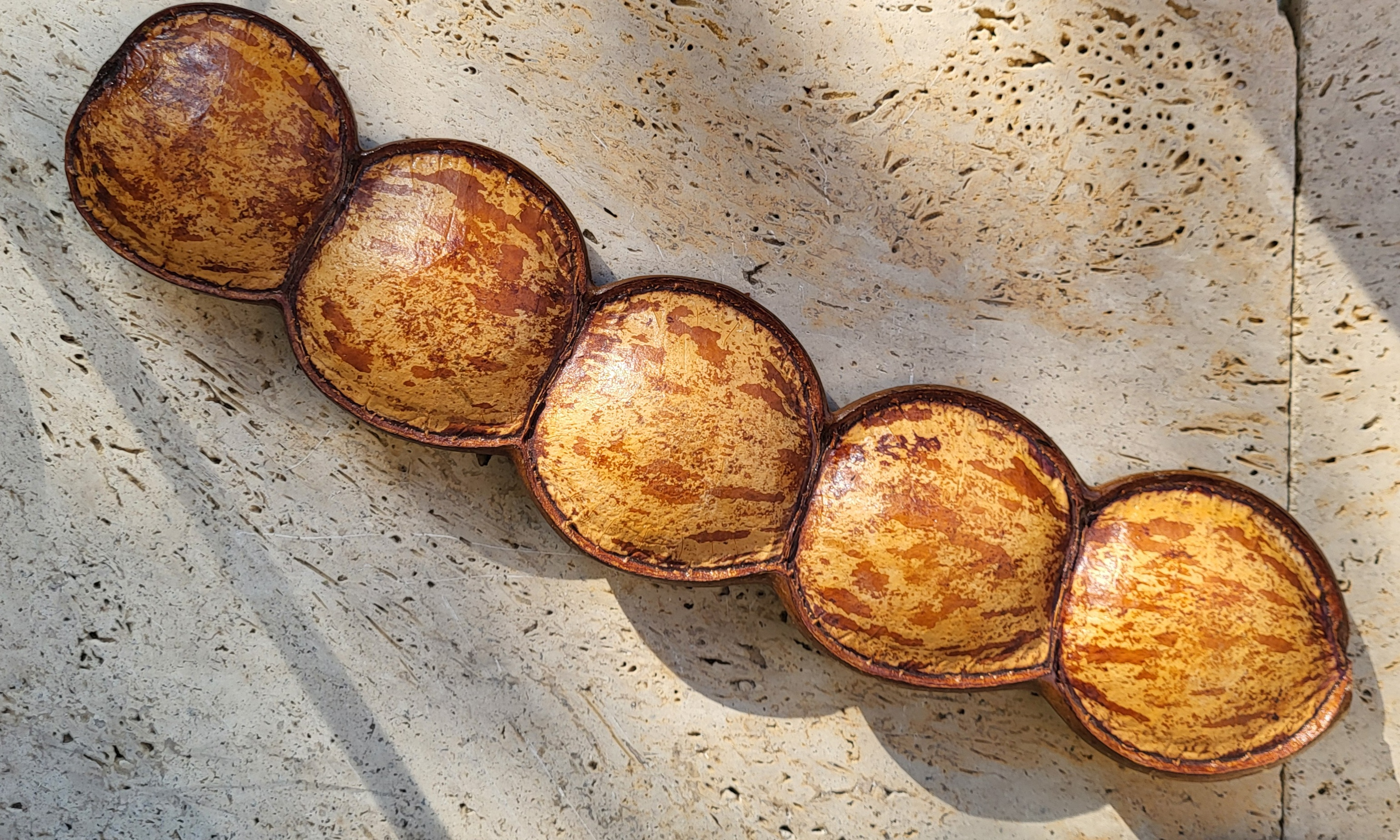
Entada gigas fruit

The fruit measures 12 cm (4.7 in) across and can reach 2 m (6.6 ft) long, with reports of pods up to 2.5 m (8 ft) long. This pod, like all legumes, is a single carpel, the largest carpel of any known plant. Inside each pod are ten to fifteen seeds, each of which have a diameter of 6 cm (2.4 in) and a thickness of 2 cm (0.79 in). The seeds contain a hollow cavity, which gives them buoyancy. After being washed by rain into rivers and then the ocean, the seeds can drift long distances on ocean currents. Seed buoyancy and vitality lasts at least two years.

== Use ==
In Gabon it is used to make ropes and nets.

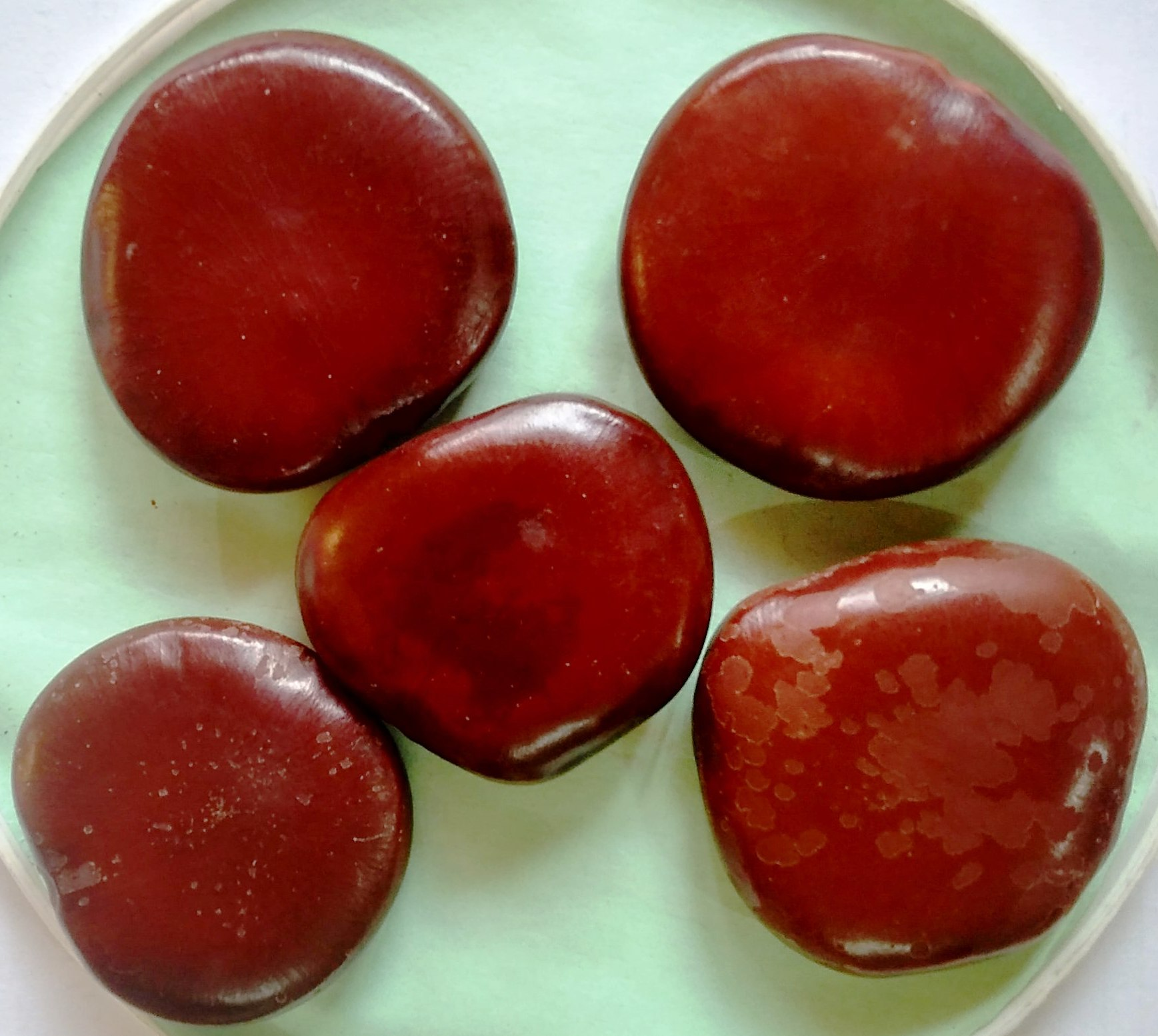
Sea heart (Entada gigas) seeds

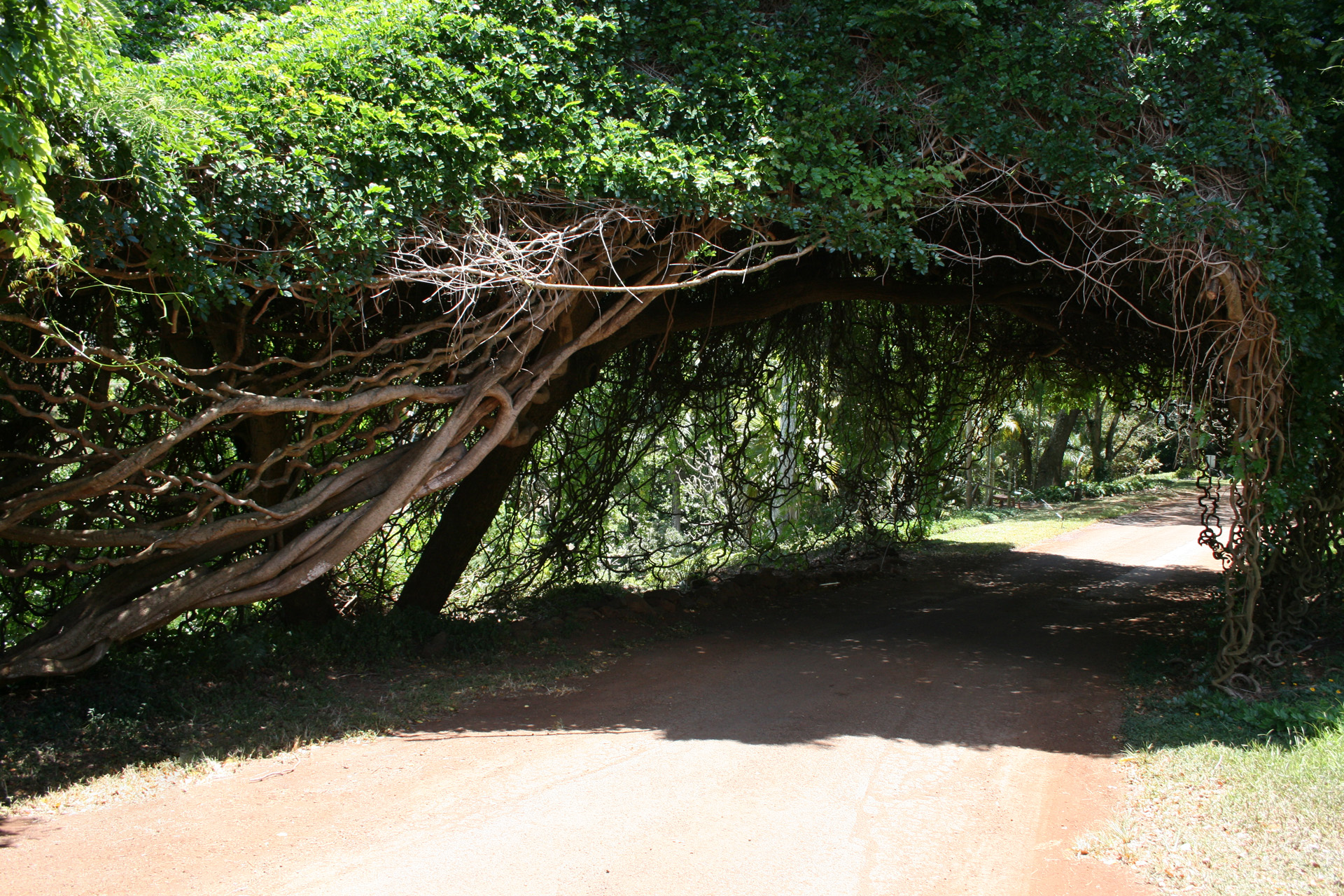
A canopy formed over lianas

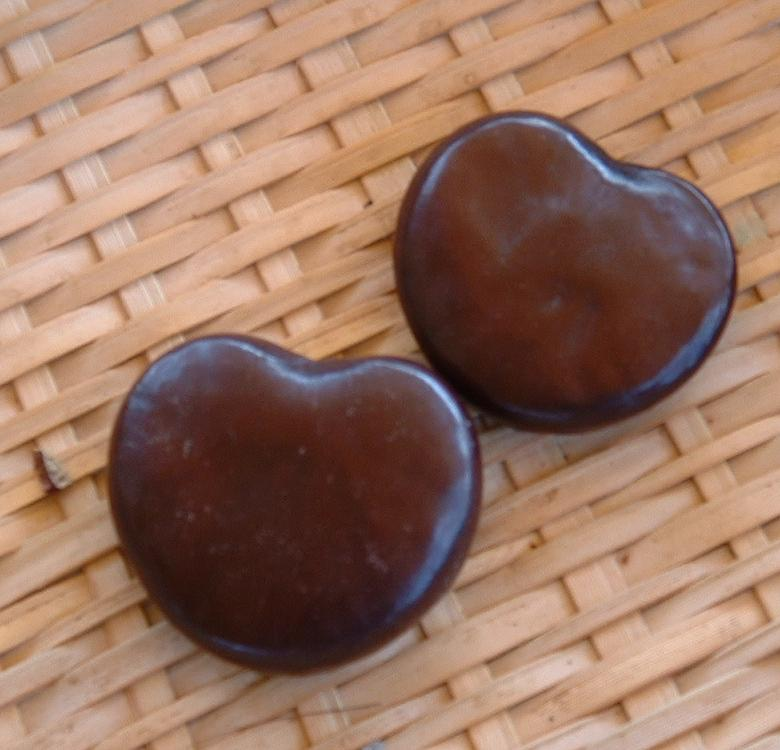
Entada gigas seeds, resembling hearts

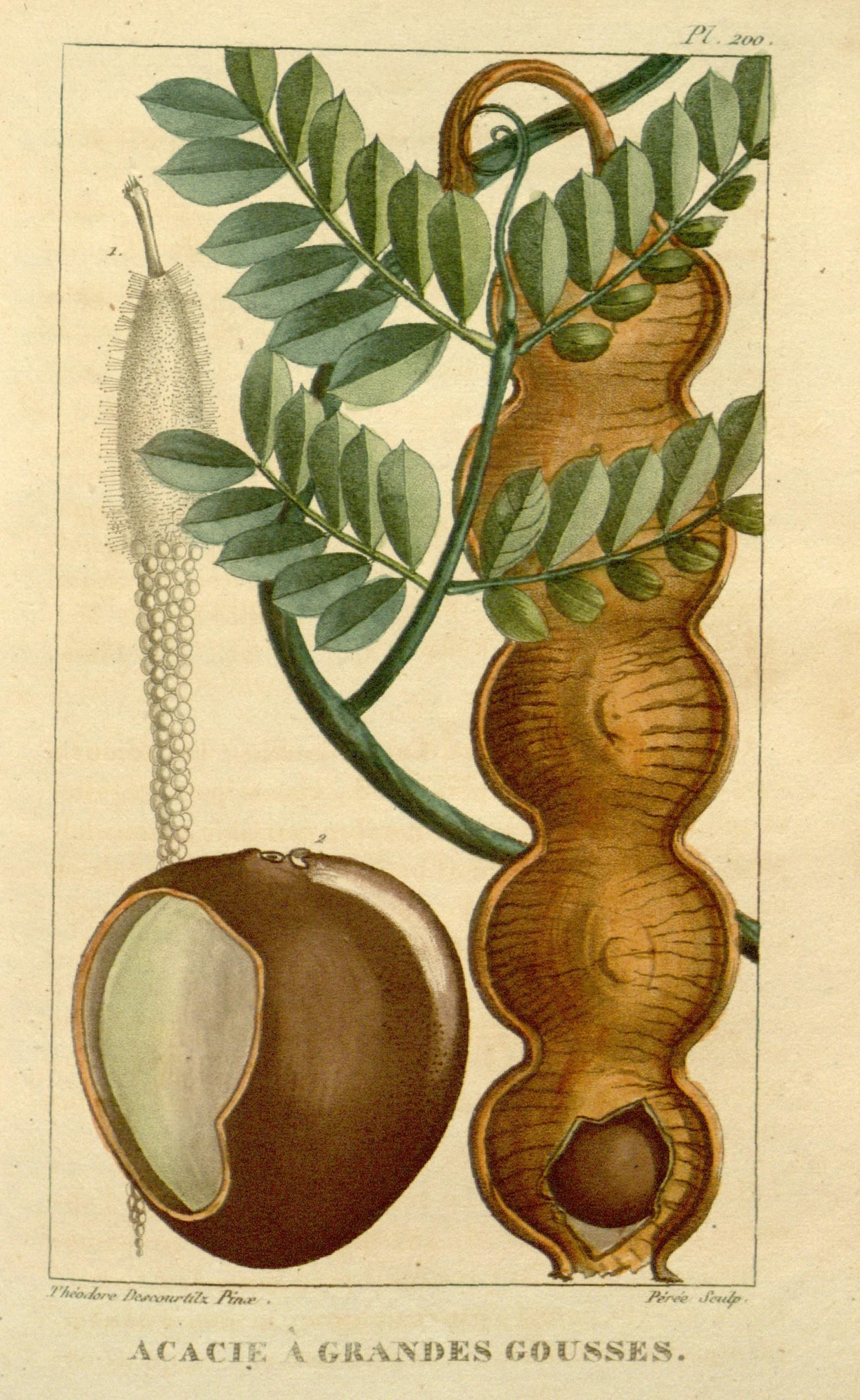
Botanical illustration from 1827
