= Nickernut =

Plant seeds

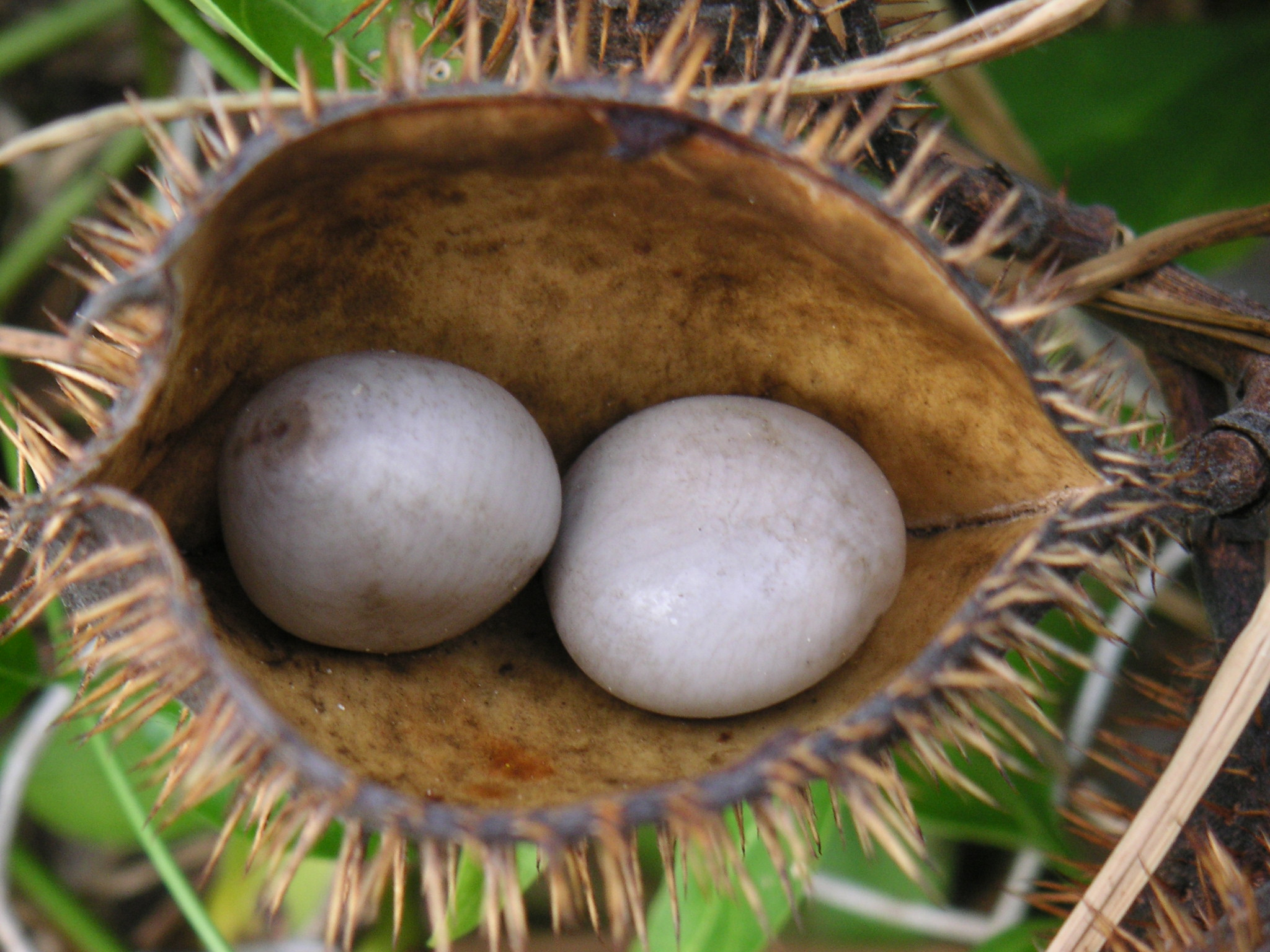
Nickernuts in fruit from G. bonduc

Nickernuts or nickar nuts are smooth, shiny seeds from tropical leguminous shrubs, particularly Guilandina bonduc and Guilandina major, both known by the common name warri tree. C. bonduc produces gray nickernuts, and C. major produces yellow. Accordingly, these species are locally known in the Caribbean as "grey nickers" and "yellow nickers".

The word nicker probably derives from the Dutch word "knikker", meaning marble.

In the Caribbean, nickernuts are used to play mancala games such as oware. The nickernut is marble-like and good for other uses, such as for jewellery; it is also sometimes ground up to make a medicinal tea.

The seeds are often found on the beach, and are also known as sea pearls or eaglestones.

Guilandina and Merremia seeds sometimes drift long distances. In 1693 James Wallace referred to them being often found in Orkney: "After Storms of Westerly Wind amongst the Sea-weed, they find commonly in places expos'd to the Western-Ocean these Phaseoli . . . . [F]rom the West-Indies, where they commonly grow, they may be thrown in on Ireland, the Western parts of Scotland and Orkney". In 1751 Erich Pontoppidan described one found on the coast of Norway: "It is of the size of a chestnut, orbicular, yet flat, or as it were compressed on both sides. Its colour is a dark brown yet in the middle, at the junction of the shells, it is varied with a circle of shining-black, and close by that another of a lively red, which have a very pretty effect". They were known as 'sea beans' in Scandinavia, where one has been found fossilised in a Swedish bog, and 'Molucca beans' in the Hebrides, where a visitor to Islay in 1772 wrote of them as seeds of "Dolichos wrens, Guilandina bonduc, G. bonducetta, and Mimosa scandens…natives of Jamaica". The 1797 Edition of the Encyclopædia Britannica said that they were used only for "the making of snuff-boxes out of them"; however, there is a long tradition of using them as amulets for good luck, banishment of ill luck or to ease childbirth.

== Gallery ==
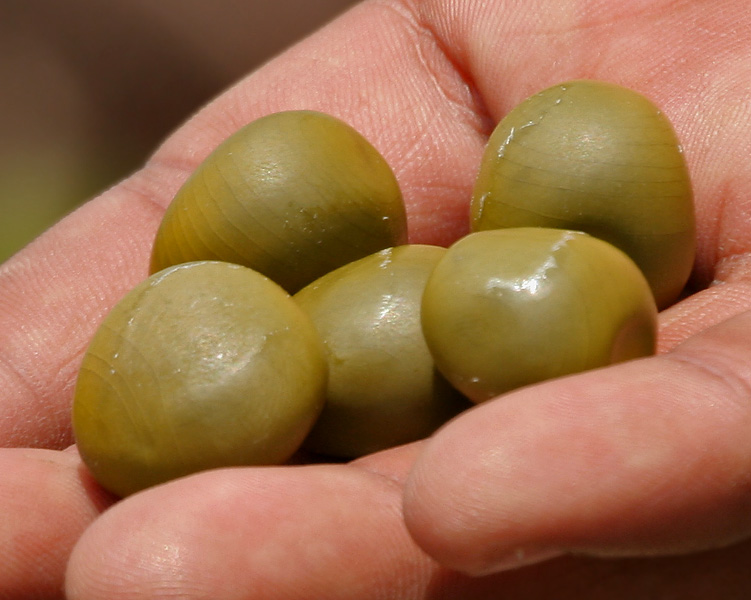
Guilandina bonduc seeds in Krishna Wildlife Sanctuary, Andhra Pradesh, India.

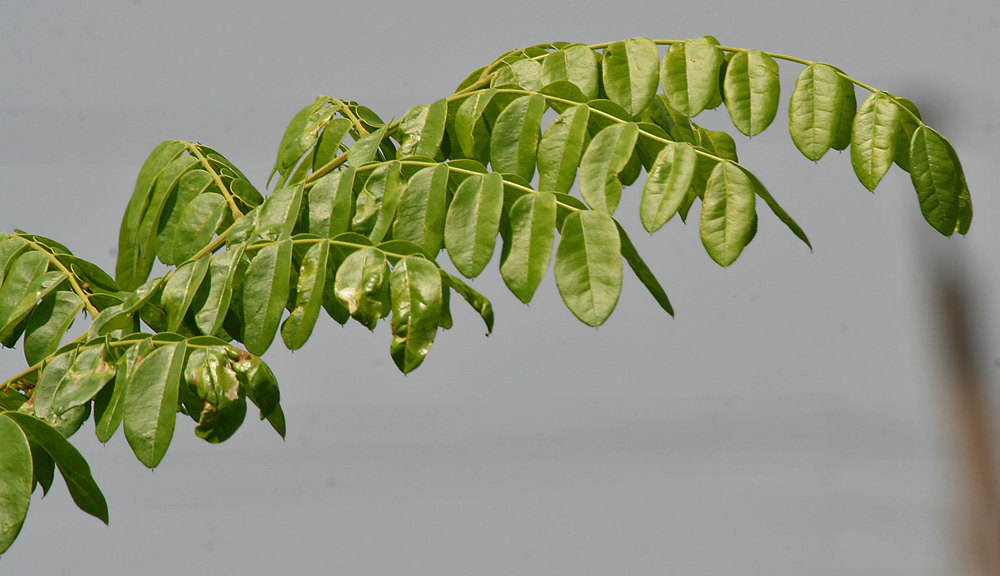
Guilandina bonduc leaves in Krishna Wildlife Sanctuary, Andhra Pradesh, India.

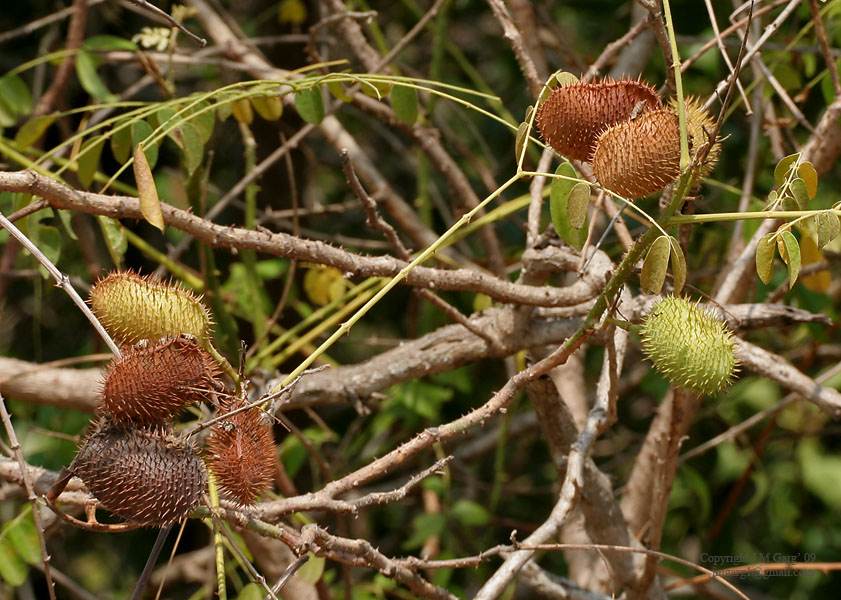
Guilandina bonduc fruit in Krishna Wildlife Sanctuary, Andhra Pradesh, India.

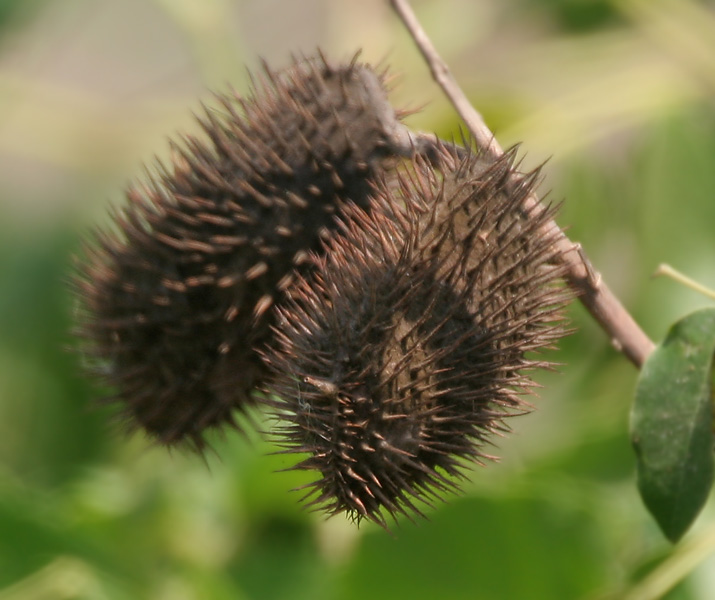
Guilandina bonduc fruit in Krishna Wildlife Sanctuary, Andhra Pradesh, India.

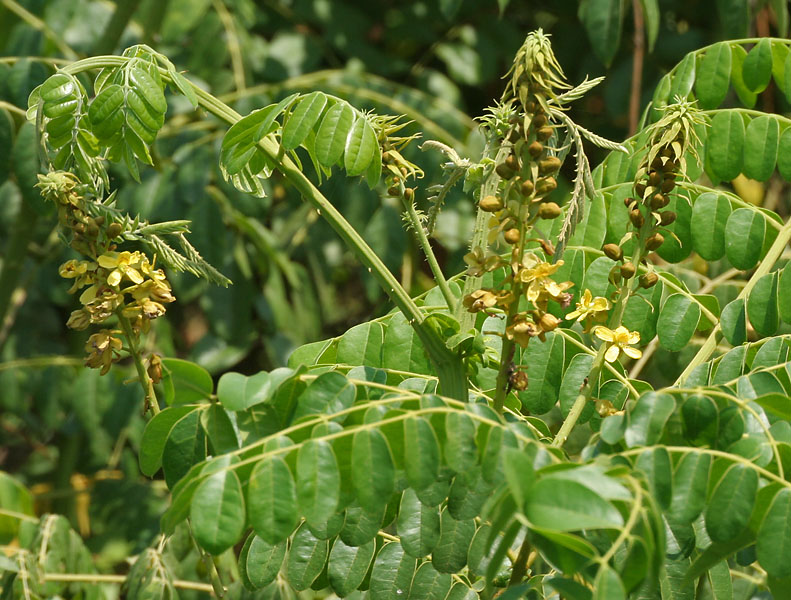
Guilandina bonduc flowers in Krishna Wildlife Sanctuary, Andhra Pradesh, India.

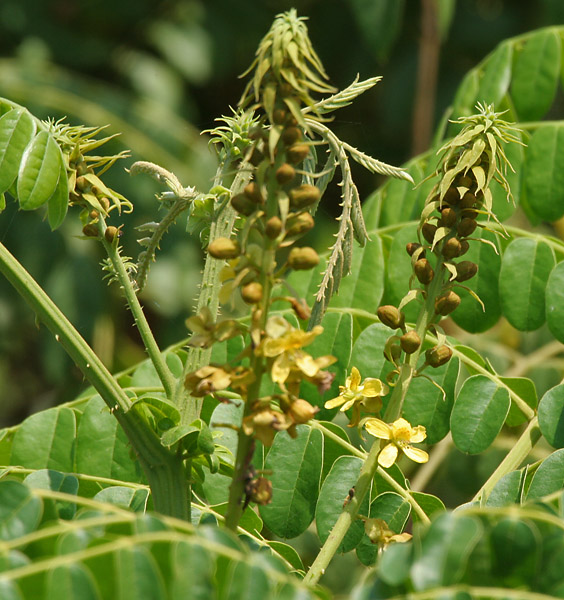
Guilandina bonduc flowers in Krishna Wildlife Sanctuary, Andhra Pradesh, India.

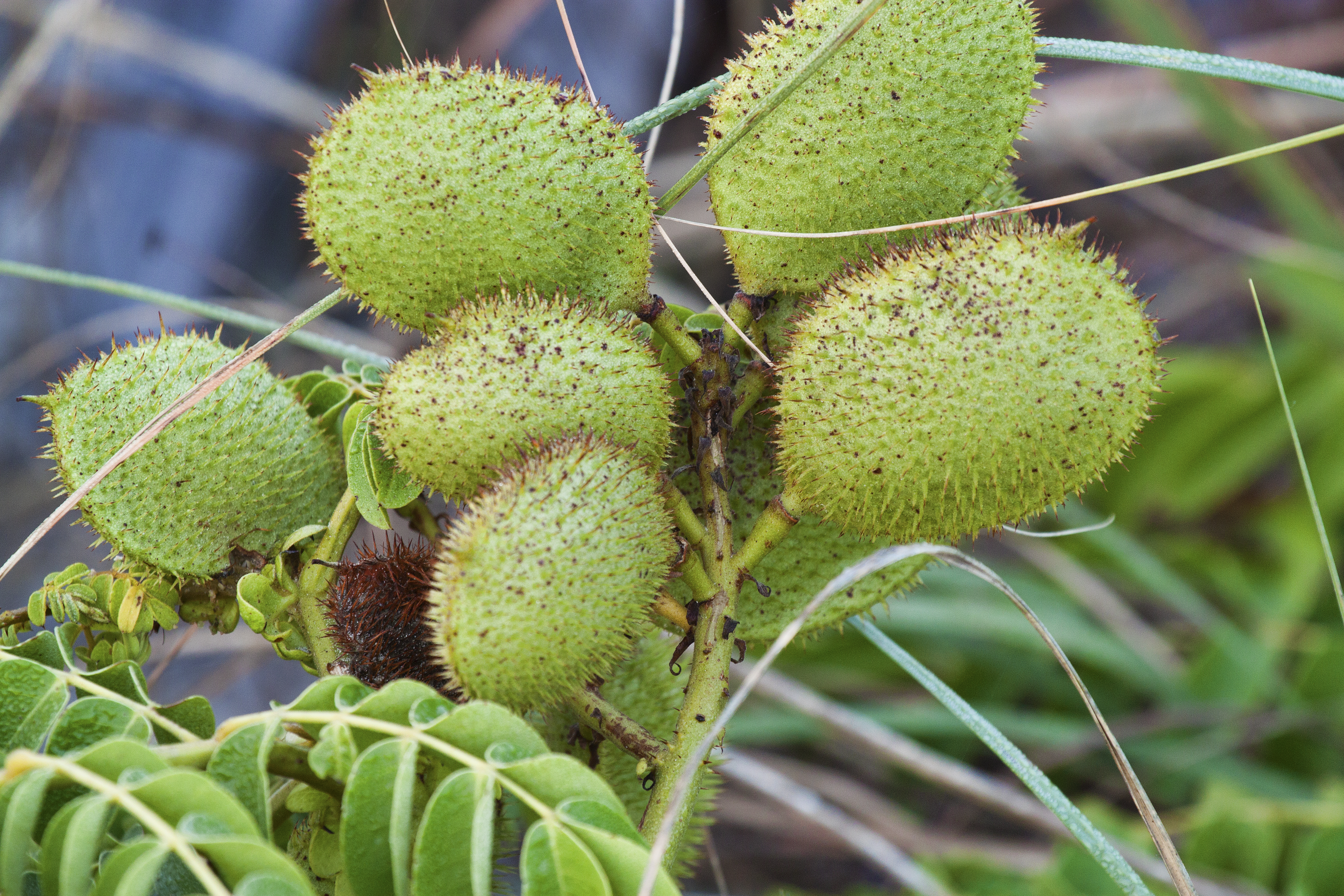
Guilandina bonduc Unripe nickernut seed pods at Port Canaveral, Florida.

== Sources ==
- E. Charles Nelson and P. H. Oswald. Ed. Wendy Walsh. Sea Beans and Nickar Nuts: A Handbook of Exotic Seeds and Fruits Stranded on Beaches in North-Western Europe. Botanical Society of the British Isles, 2000. B.S.B.I. Handbooks for Physical Identification 10. ISBN 0-901158-29-1
