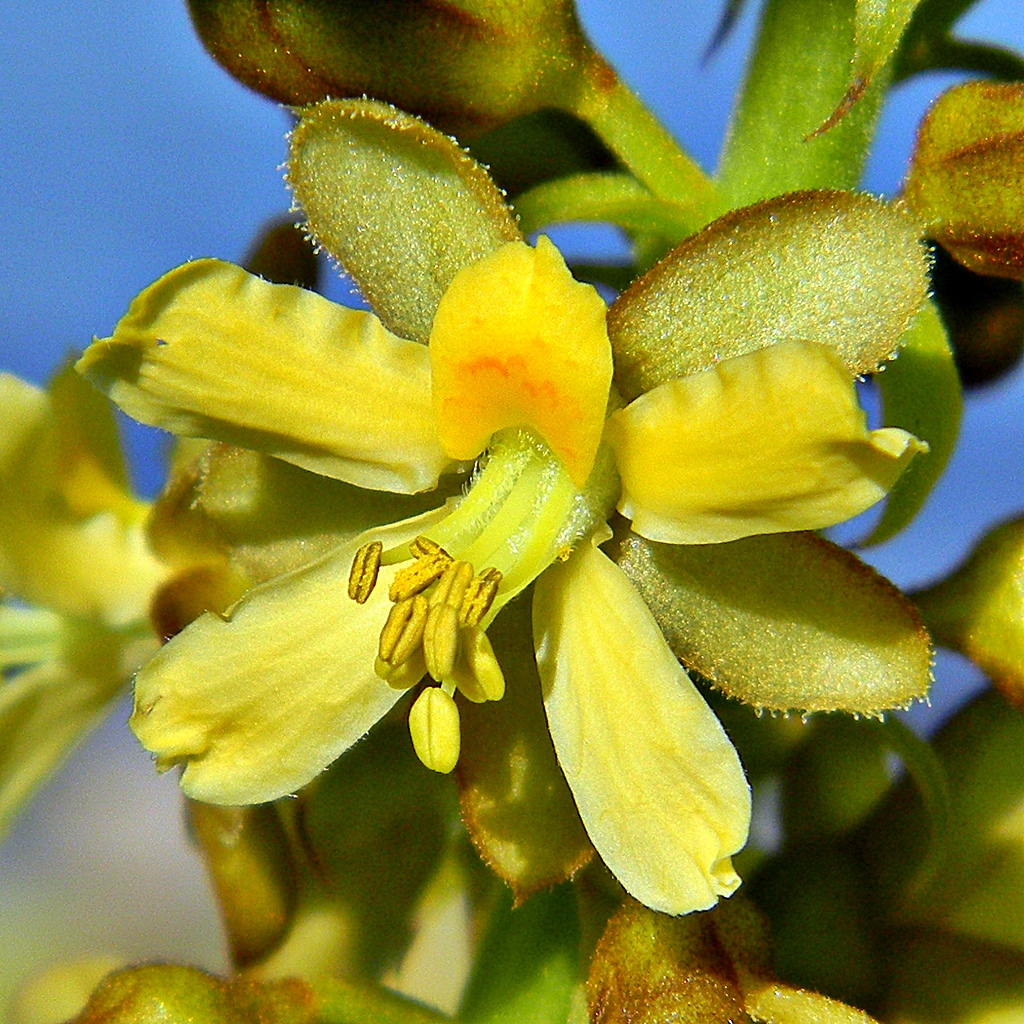
- Guilandina bonduc

Scientific classification
- Kingdom: Plantae
- Clade: Tracheophytes
- Clade: Angiosperms
- Clade: Eudicots
- Clade: Rosids
- Order: Fabales
- Family: Fabaceae
- Subfamily: Caesalpinioideae
- Tribe: Caesalpinieae
- Genus: Guilandina; L. (1753)

Type species
- Guilandina bonduc L. (1753)

Synonyms
- Bonduc Adans. (1763); Caesalpinia subgen. Guilandina (L. 1753) Gillis & Proctor (1974)

= Guilandina =

Genus of legumes

Guilandina is a genus of flowering plants in the legume family, Fabaceae. It belongs to the subfamily Caesalpinioideae and tribe Caesalpinieae.

The genus was named after Melchior Wieland (1515–1589), a Prussian naturalist who "Italianized" his name as "Guilandini" upon moving to Italy.

== Species ==
The genus Guilandina comprises the following species:

- Guilandina barkeriana (Urb. & Ekman) Britton (Cuba and Haiti)
- Guilandina bonduc L. 1753 – grey nicker, knicker nut (pantropical)
- Guilandina caymanensis (Millsp.) Britton & Rose (Cayman Islands)
- Guilandina ciliata Bergius ex Wikstrom – broadpad nicker (Caribbean)
- Guilandina culebrae Britton & Wilson ex Britton & Rose – smooth yellow nicker (Puerto Rico)
- Guilandina delphinensis (Du Puy & R.Rabev.) G.P.Lewis (southeastern Madagascar)
- Guilandina glaucophylla (Urb.) Britton & Rose (Cuba, Swan Islands)
- Guilandina intermedia (Urb.) Britton & Rose (Cuba and Jamaica)
- Guilandina major (DC.) Small – yellow nicker (pantropical)
- Guilandina minax (Hance) G.P.Lewis (eastern Himalayas, Indochina, and southern China)
- Guilandina murifructa (Gillis & Proctor) G.P.Lewis (Bahamas)
- Guilandina portoricensis Britton & Wilson – brown nicker (Puerto Rico)
- Guilandina robusta (C.T.White) G.P.Lewis (Cook region of Queensland)
- Guilandina solomonensis (Hattink) G.P.Lewis (New Georgia in the Solomon Islands)
- Guilandina sphaerosperma (Urb. & Ekman) Britton (Hispaniola)
- Guilandina urophylla (Donn. Sm.) Britton & Rose (Costa Rica)
- Guilandina volkensii (Harms) G.P.Lewis (Ethiopia, Kenya, Uganda, and Tanzania)
- Guilandina wrightiana (Urb.) Britton & Rose (Cayman Islands, Cuba, and Jamaica)
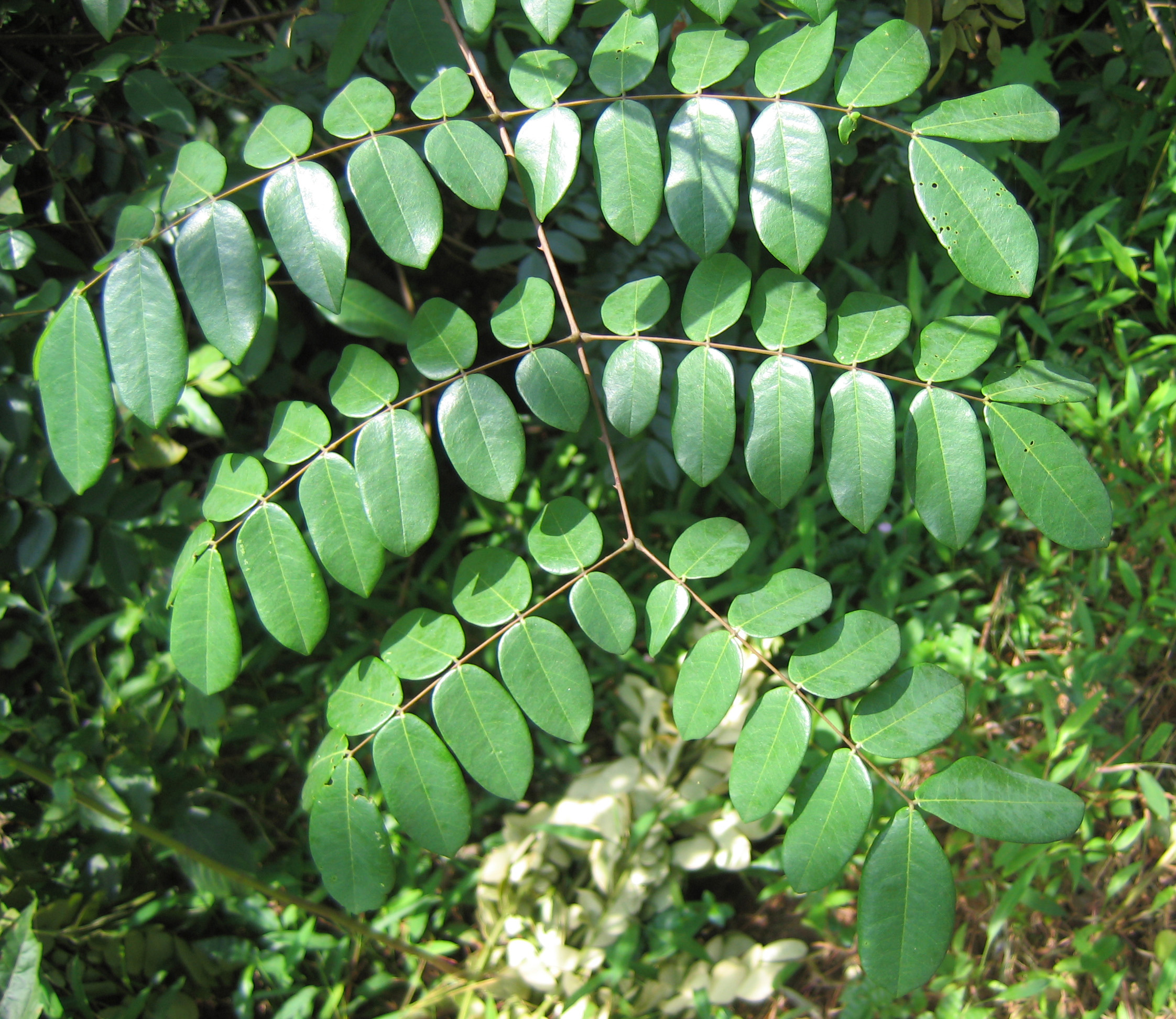
Leaves of Guilandina bonduc

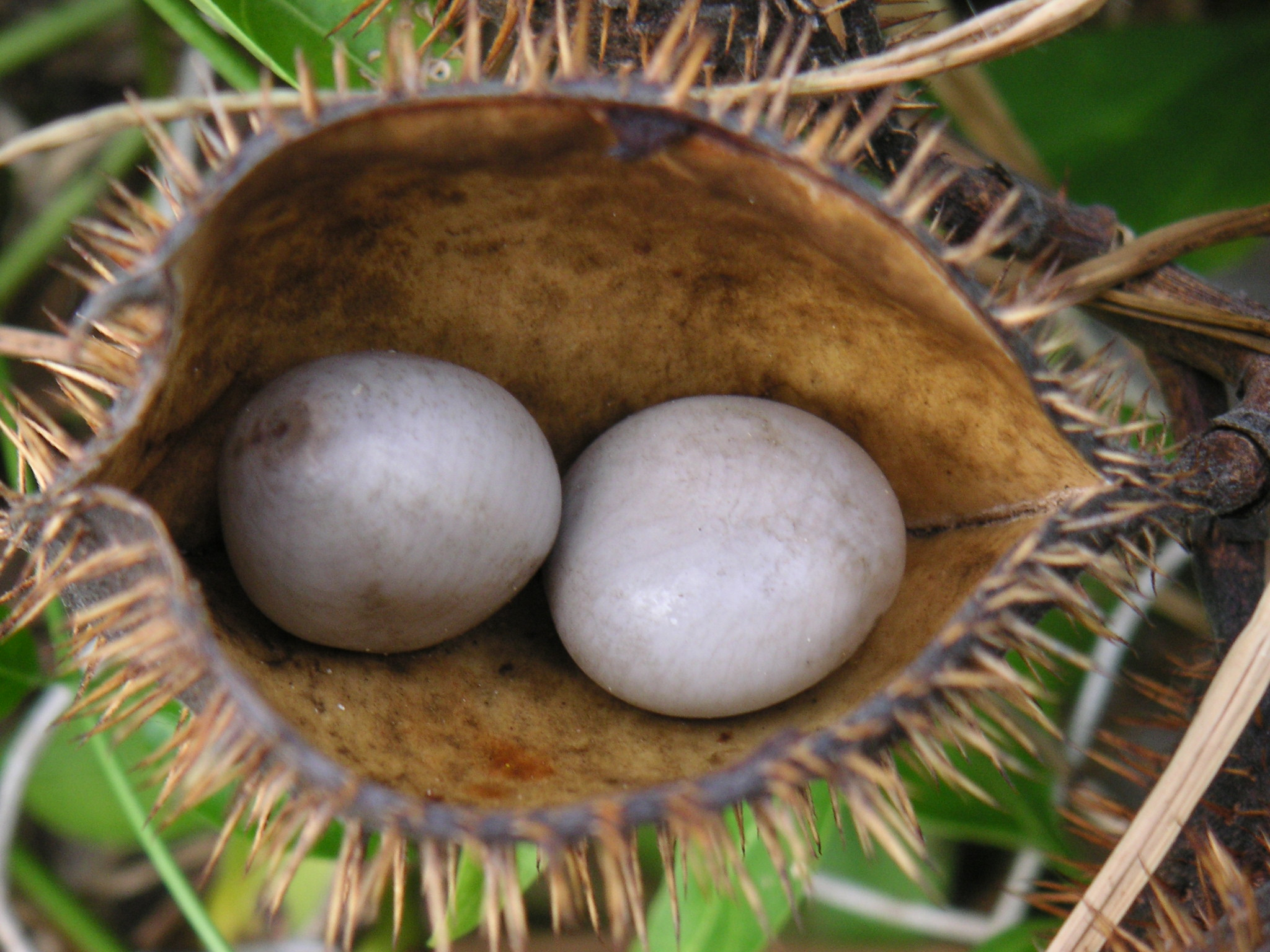
Fruits of G. bonduc
