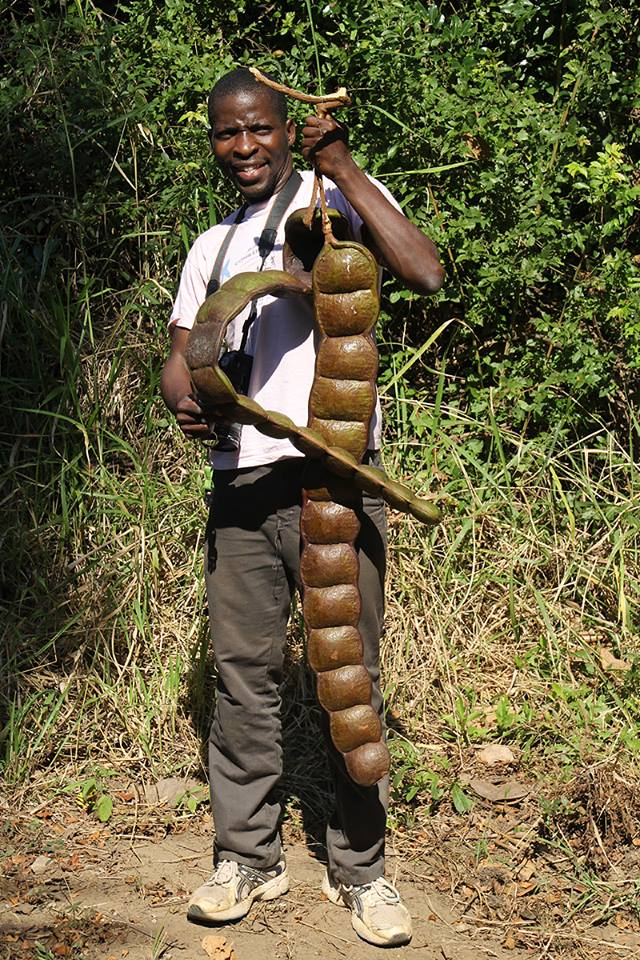
- Mature pod in Mozambique

Scientific classification
- Kingdom: Plantae
- Clade: Embryophytes
- Clade: Tracheophytes
- Clade: Spermatophytes
- Clade: Angiosperms
- Clade: Eudicots
- Clade: Rosids
- Order: Fabales
- Family: Fabaceae
- Subfamily: Caesalpinioideae
- Clade: Mimosoid clade
- Genus: Entada
- Species: E. rheedei

Binomial name
- Entada rheedei Spreng.

Synonyms
- 14 synonyms: for ssp. rheedei; Adenanthera gogo Blanco; Entada cirrhosa Raf.; Entada entada (L.) Huth; Entada formosana Kaneh.; Entada gogo (Blanco) I.M.Johnst.; Entada koshunensis Hayata & Kaneh.; Entada laotica Gagnep.; Entada monostachya DC.; Entada pursaetha DC.; Entada pursaetha var. formosana (Kaneh.) F.C.Ho ex T.C.Huang & H.Ohashi; Entada schefferi Ridl.; Mimosa entada L.; for ssp. sinohimalensis; Entada pursaetha subsp. sinohimalensis Grierson & D.G.Long; Entada pursaetha var. sinohimalensis (Grierson & D.G.Long) C.Chen & H.Sun

= Entada rheedei =

Species of plant

Entada rheedei, commonly known as African dream herb or snuff box sea bean, and as the cacoon vine in Jamaica, is a large woody liana or climber of the Mimosa clade Mimosoideae. The vine can grow as long as 120 m (390 ft). Their seeds have a thick and durable seed coat which allows them to survive lengthy periods of immersion in seawater. These seeds come in a pod which can be up to 6.5 feet (two meters) in length.

== Taxonomy ==
The species was first described in 1825 by German botanist Kurt Polycarp Joachim Sprengel. It was published as E. rheedii, but has been corrected to Entada rheedei under the International Code of Botanical Nomenclature (Vienna Code), as the name honours Hendrik Adriaan van Rheede tot Draakestein (1637–1691).

=== Subspecies ===
Two subspecies are accepted:

- Entada rheedei subsp. rheedei
- Entada rheedei subsp. sinohimalensis (Grierson & D.G.Long) Panigrah

== Traditional use ==
The species is employed in African traditional medicine to induce vivid dreams, said to enable communication with the spirit world. The inner meat of the seed would be either consumed directly, or the meat would be chopped, dried, mixed with other herbs like tobacco and smoked just before sleep to induce the desired dreams.

The plant is also used as a topical ointment against jaundice, toothache, ulcers and to treat muscular-skeletal problems. The seeds are sought after as pieces of jewelry and as good-luck charms.

== Distribution and habitat ==
Its seeds are found on east and southern African beaches, having grown on river and estuary banks and in swamp forest. As a result of its ready dispersal by sea, Entada rheedei is widely distributed in tropical and subtropical areas (excluding the Americas): tropical Africa, South Africa, tropical Asia and Queensland.

== Gallery ==
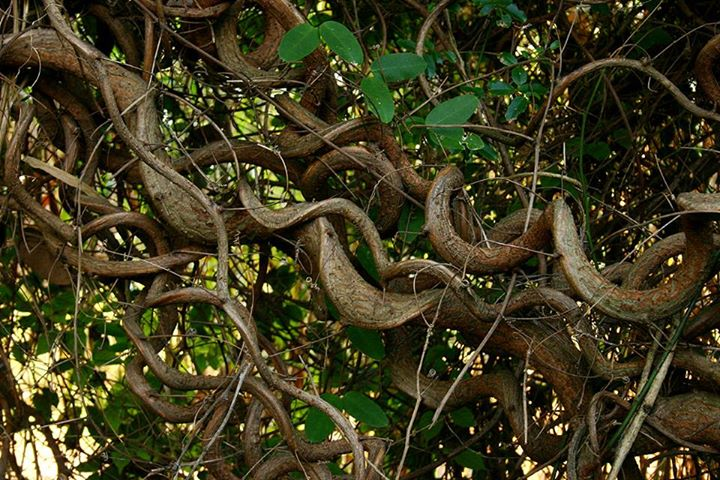
Twisted stem

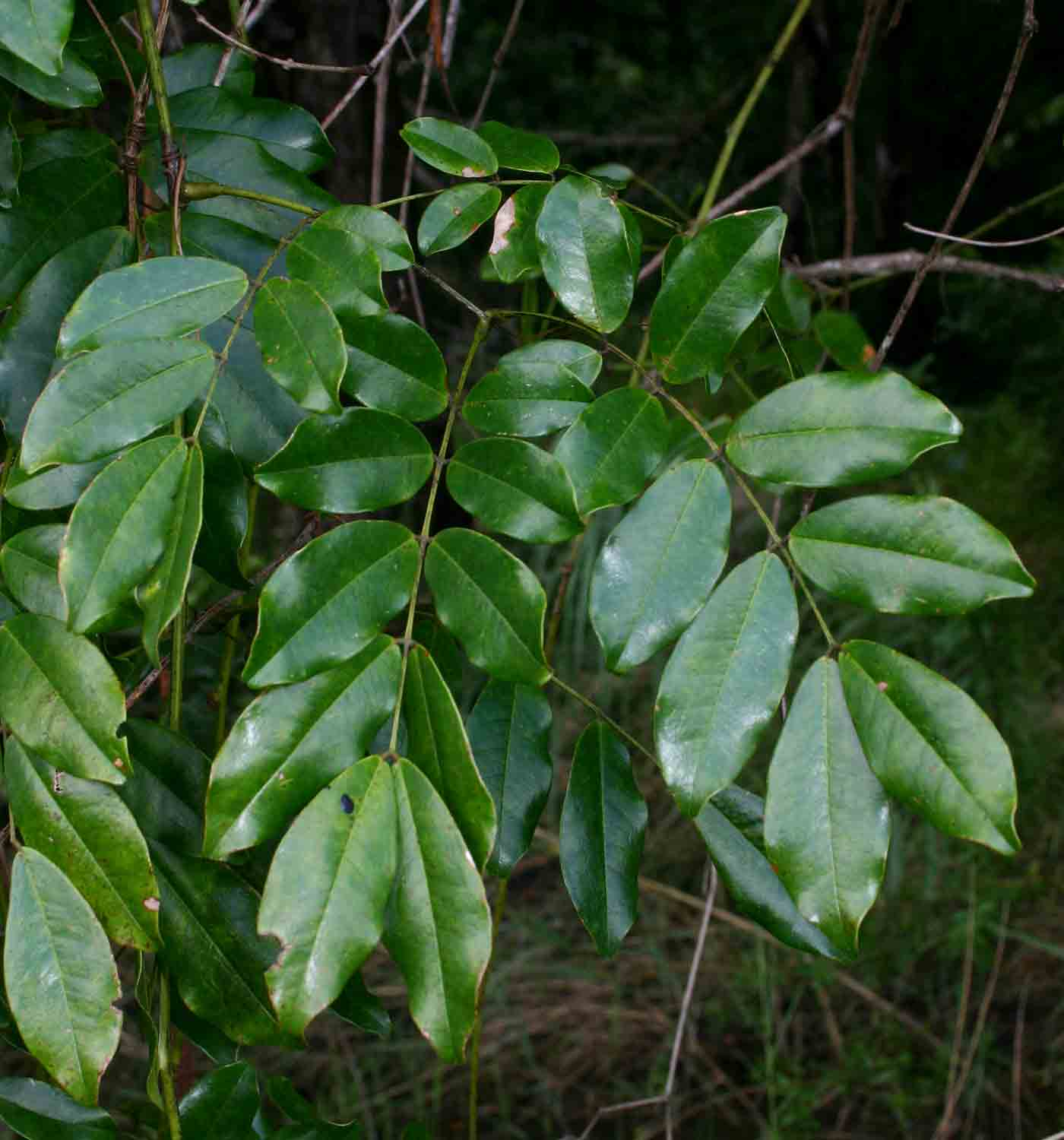
Foliage

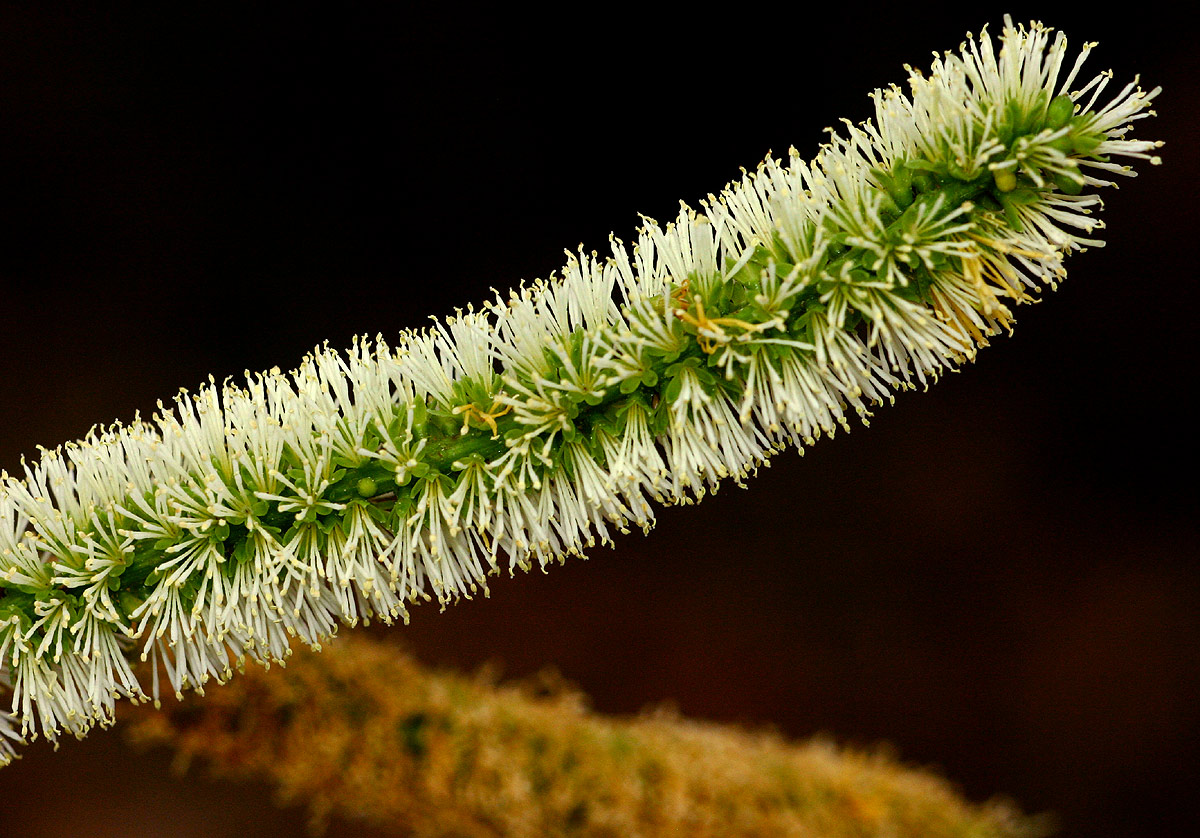
Flower spike

Seeds
