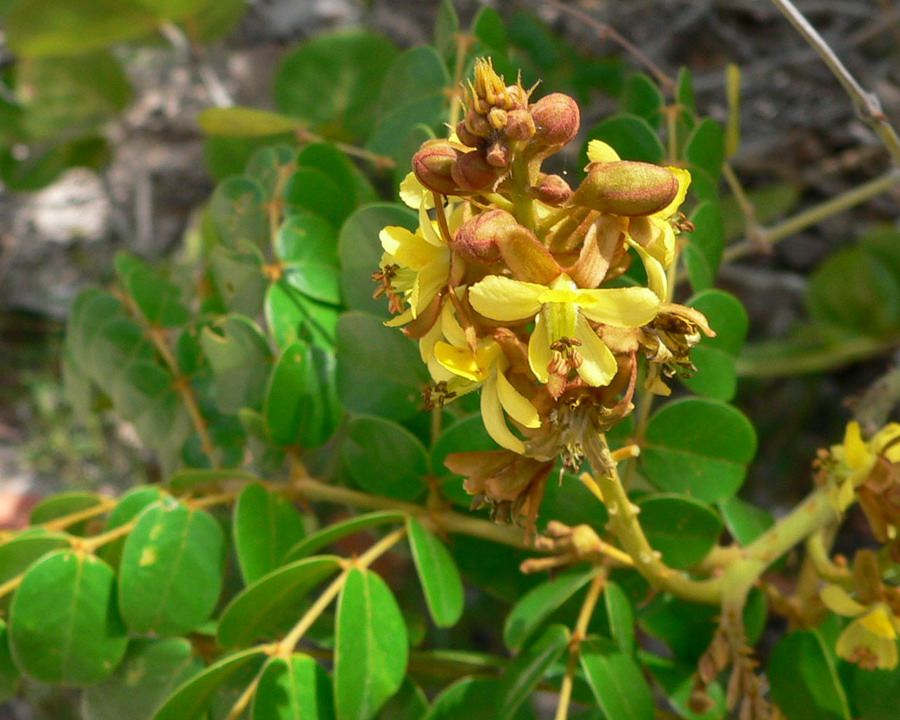

Conservation status
- Least Concern (IUCN 3.1)

Scientific classification
- Kingdom: Plantae
- Clade: Embryophytes
- Clade: Tracheophytes
- Clade: Angiosperms
- Clade: Eudicots
- Clade: Rosids
- Order: Fabales
- Family: Fabaceae
- Subfamily: Caesalpinioideae
- Genus: Guilandina
- Species: G. bonduc

Binomial name
- Guilandina bonduc L.

Synonyms
- 14 synonyms: Bonduc minus Medik.; Caesalpinia bonduc (L.) Roxb.; Caesalpinia bonducella Fleming; Caesalpinia jayabo var. cyanosperma M.Gómez; Guilandina aculeata Salisb.; Guilandina bonduc var. minor DC.; Guilandina bonducella L.; Bonduc canadense Medik.; Caesalpinia bonducella var. aequiaculeata Kuntze; Caesalpinia bonducella var. elegans Kuntze; Caesalpinia bonducella var. inaequiaculeata Kuntze; Caesalpinia glabra (Mill.) Merr.; Caesalpinia homblei R.Wilczek; Caesalpinia jayabo var. gemina (Lour.) M.Gómez; Caesalpinia sogerensis Baker f.; Glycyrrhiza aculeata Forssk.; Guilandina gemina Lour.; Guilandina glabra Mill.; Guilandina homblei (R.Wilczek) G.P.Lewis; Guilandina socorroensis Britton & Rose; Guilandina vulgaris Oken

= Guilandina bonduc =

Species of legume

Guilandina bonduc, commonly known as nicker nut amongst other names, is a species of flowering plant in the bean family Fabaceae that has a mostly pantropical distribution. It is a scrambling, thorny shrub or vine that is mostly found close to coastlines, and was first described in 1753 by Carl Linnaeus.

== Description ==
Guilandina bonduc grows as a scrambling shrub or climber, up to 8 m (30 ft) long. The stems are irregularly covered with curved prickles. The leaves are large and bi-pinnate, up to 40 cm (16 in) long with scattered prickles on the rachises and blades. There are four to eleven pairs of pinnae, 5 to 20 cm (2 to 8 in) long with five to ten pairs of pinnules. The pinnules are 15 to 40 mm (0.6 to 1.6 in) long, elliptic, oblong or ovate with acute tips and entire margins.

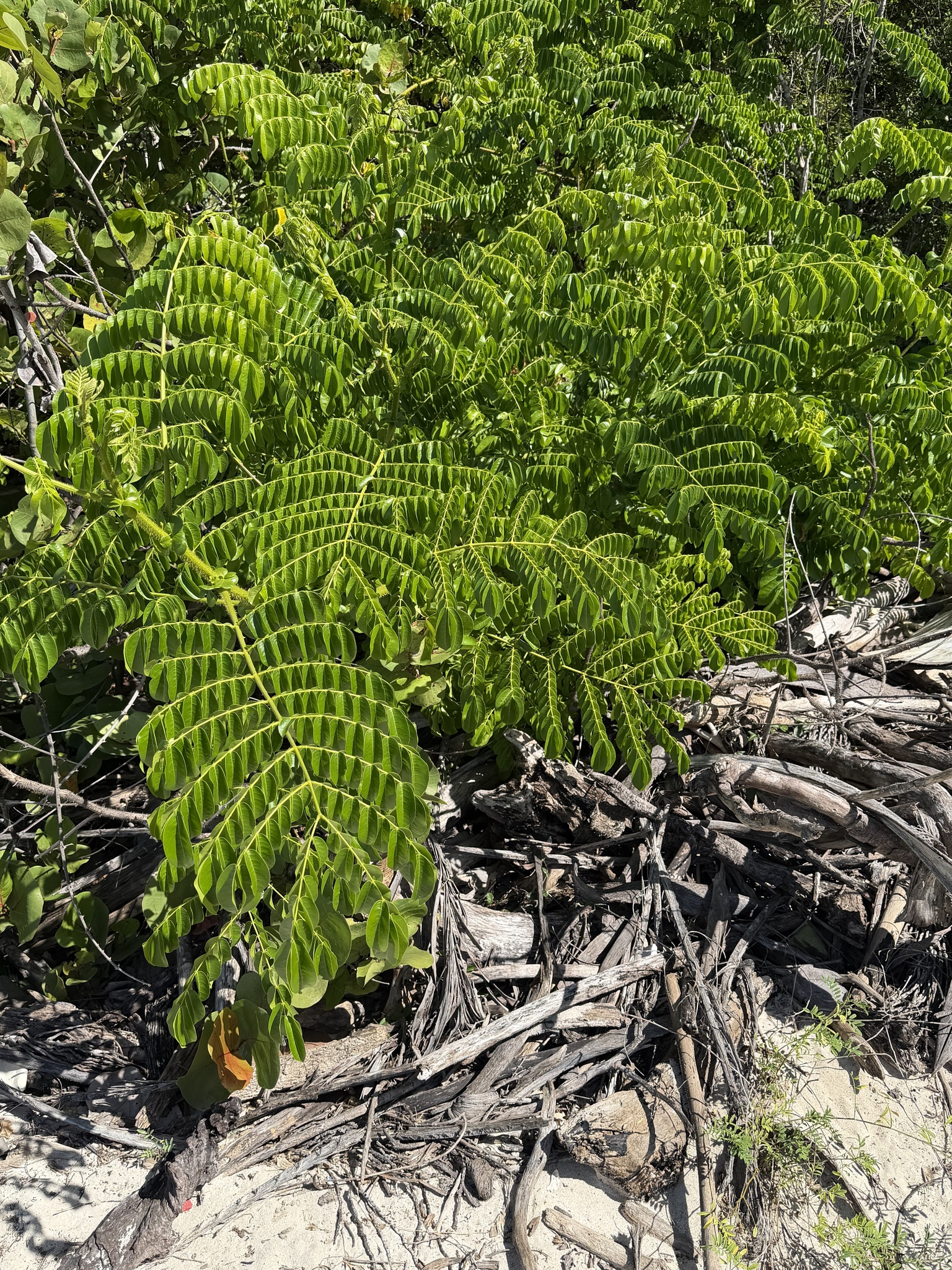
Habit

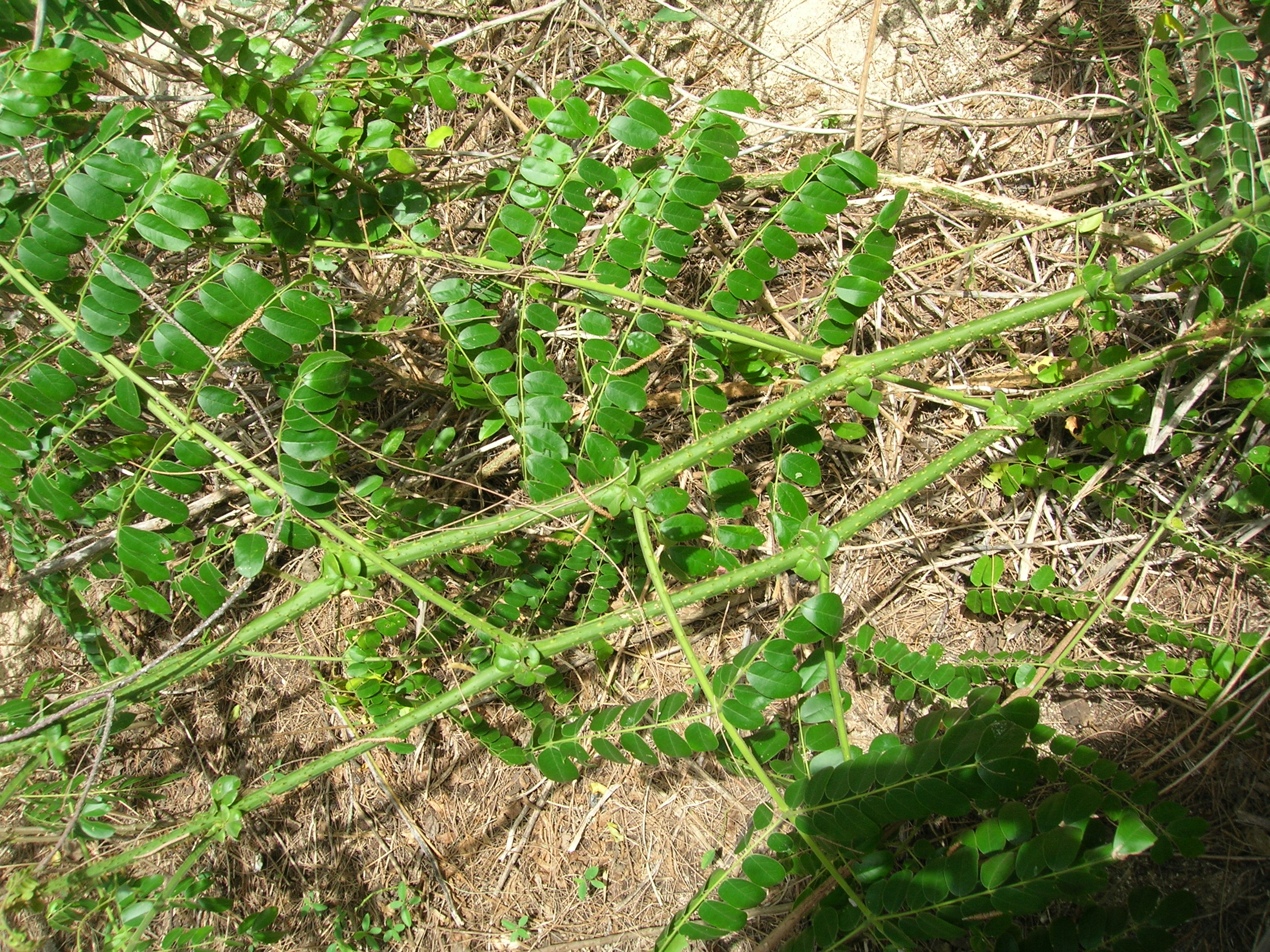
Branches with thorns and stipules

The inflorescence is an axillary raceme, often branched, covered with short hairs and up to 15 cm (6 in) long. The jointed pedicels are up to 6 mm (0.2 in) long. The sepals are shorter than the petals which are around 10 mm (0.4 in) long; the petals are yellow, sometimes with a spot of orange near the base of the keel. The unisexual flowers are followed by large, flattish, spiny green pods which later turn brown, some 9 by 4 cm (4 by 2 in), containing one or usually two, glossy, rounded, grey seeds.

Its 2 cm (0.8 in) grey seeds are buoyant and durable enough to be dispersed by ocean currents.

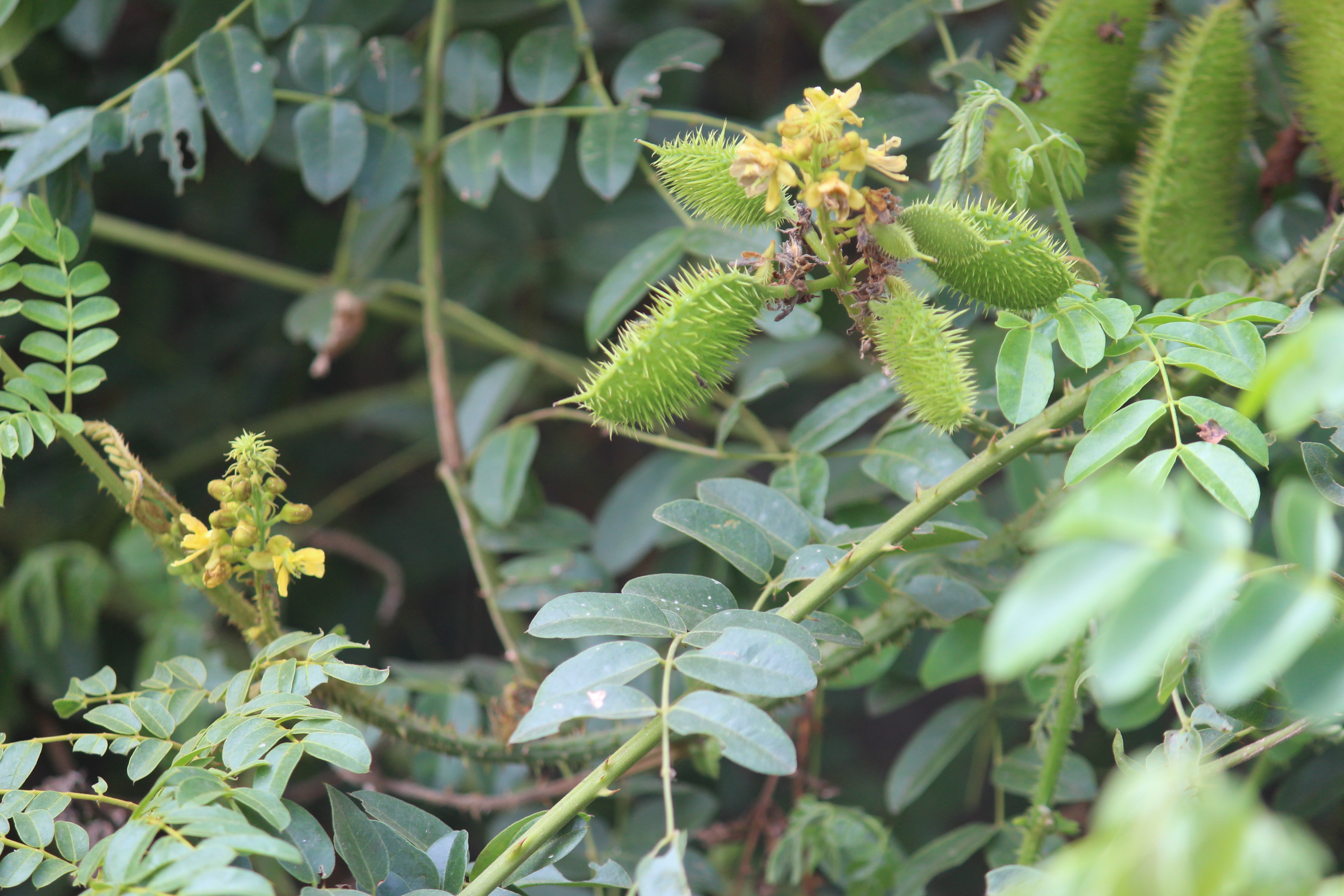
Flowers & immature fruit

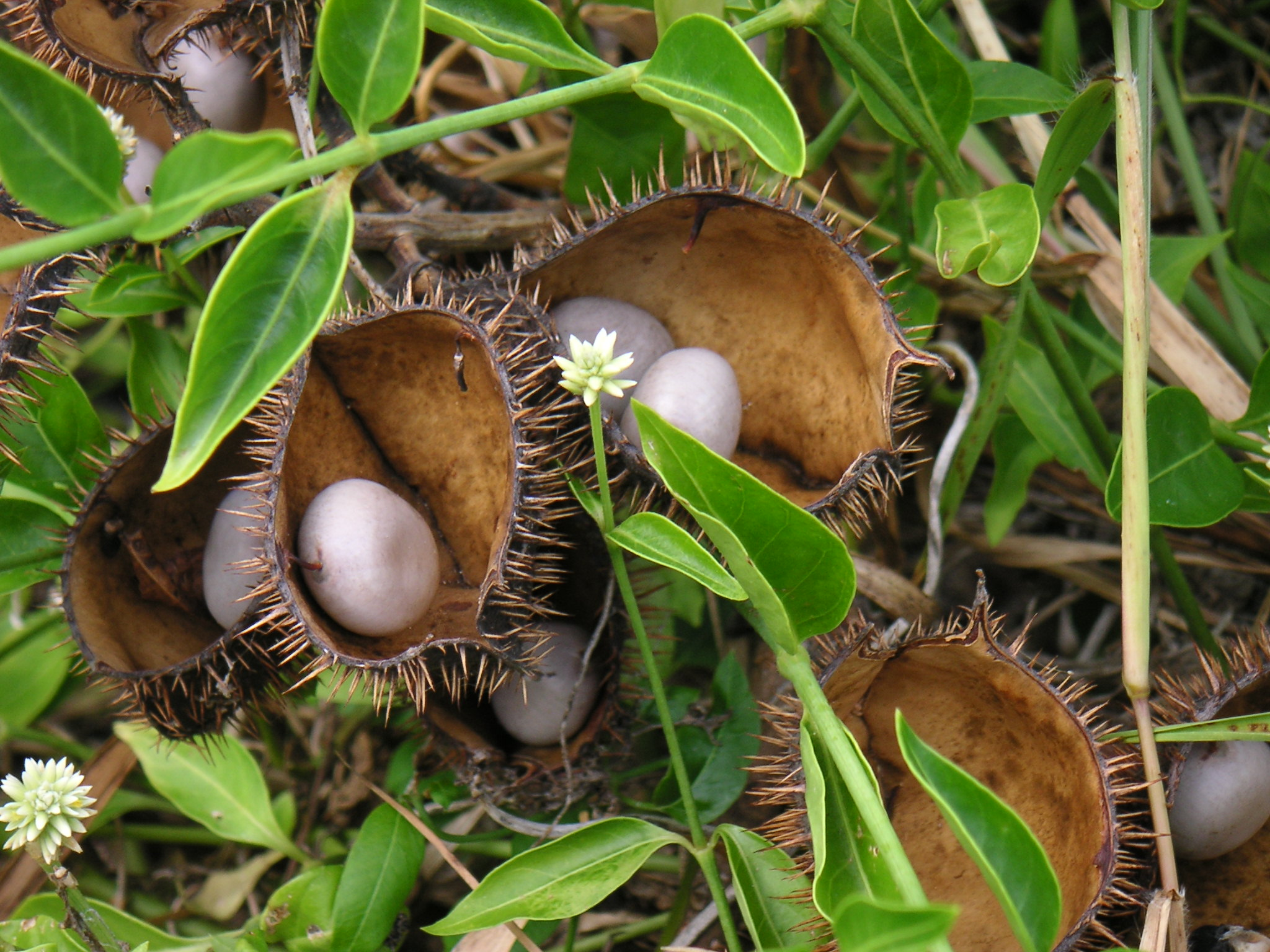
Opened pods with seeds

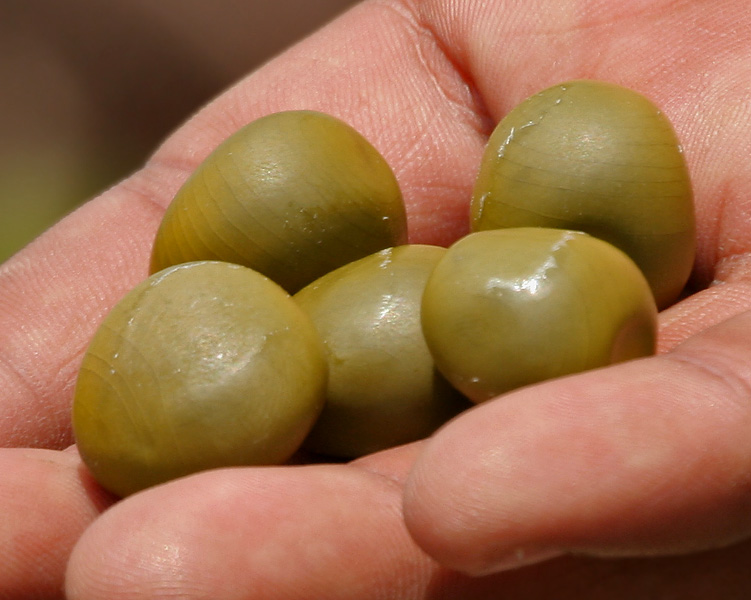
Seeds

== Distribution and habitat ==
Guilandina bonduc occurs in tropical and subtropical regions of the world, and is present on all continents except Antarctica. It typically grows near the coast, in scrub, on sand dunes and on the upper shore. It also occurs inland, in lowland secondary forest and disturbed areas near villages; this may be the result of the seed being accidentally dropped after being transported for medical purposes or for use as counters in board games. The seeds are buoyant and retain their viability in both fresh and sea water, enabling them to disperse to new coastal locations. When washed up on the shore, they are sometimes known as sea pearls.

== Taxonomy ==
This plant was first described by Carl Linnaeus in his book Species plantarum, published in 1753. For a time some authorities accepted the name Caesalpinia bonduc which was proposed by Scottish botanist William Roxburgh in 1824, but that has been synonymised with G. bonduc.

== Common names ==
Due to its wide distribution in many countries and cultures, this plant has numerous common names. These include gray nicker, grey nicker, grey nickerbean, yellow nickers, nicker nut, wait-a-while, bonduc and nivi-nivi, along with numerous others.

== Uses ==
Nodules on the plant's roots contain symbiotic bacteria that fix nitrogen. This is used as a nutrient by the vine and also benefits other plants growing in close proximity. It is a popular local ornamental plant in Malaysia.

This plant has been used in traditional medicine. The seeds have tonic and antipyretic properties and the bark and leaves have been used likewise. The root can be pounded to remedy caterpillar stings, it can be boiled and its broth drank to regulate menstruation. An oil extracted from the seeds has been used in cosmetics and for treating discharges from the ear.

Tongans make the hard seeds (talatala 'amoa) into leis or play with them like marbles; its spiky leaves and stems are used in fruit bat snares.
