= M. nigricans =

M. nigricans may refer to:

- Makaira nigricans, the Atlantic blue marlin, a fish species endemic to the Atlantic Ocean
- Mantella nigricans, the Guibé's mantella, a frog species endemic to Madagascar
- Melanogaster nigricans, a hoverfly species in the genus Melanogaster
- Melinda nigricans, a fly species in the genus Melinda
- Micropterus salmoides, the largemouth bass, a fish species found in the United States of America
- Milax nigricans, Philippi, 1836, a land slug species in the genus Milax
- Molossus nigricans, a bat species in the genus Molossus
- Myotis nigricans, the black myotis, a bat species from South and Central America
- Mucuna nigricans, a plant species in the genus Mucuna

== See also ==
- Nigricans (disambiguation)
