= Mucuna paniculata =

Conservation status
- Least Concern (IUCN 3.1)

Scientific classification
- Kingdom: Plantae
- Clade: Embryophytes
- Clade: Tracheophytes
- Clade: Spermatophytes
- Clade: Angiosperms
- Clade: Eudicots
- Clade: Rosids
- Order: Fabales
- Family: Fabaceae
- Subfamily: Faboideae
- Genus: Mucuna
- Species: M. paniculata

Binomial name
- Mucuna paniculata Baker

Synonyms
- Mucuna horrida Baill.; Mucuna myriaptera Baker

Species of legume

Mucuna paniculata is a species of flowering, woody vine in the family Fabaceae, the bean family. It is native to northern Madagascar where it is locally known in Malagasy as vohinkovika. It flowers between June and August.

== Distribution and habitat ==
Mucuna paniculata is found at elevations between sea level to 2,500 m (8,200 ft) in northern Madagascar. These vines can be found in both humid and sub-humid forests, usually near rivers and streams.

== Toxicity ==
Species in the genus Mucuna are known to carry irritant hairs. These hairs contain mucunain, an enzyme which causes itching. This enzyme can be destroyed using heat.

== Cultivation ==
This plant usually grows well in well-drained soil under shade. They are propagated with seeds.

== Conservation ==
It is listed as 'least concern' by the IUCN.

=== Threats ===
Habitat destruction by slash-and-burn techniques pose a potential threat to the species.

=== Protected areas ===
The species is found in the protected areas of the Betampona Integral Natural Reserve, Manongarivo Special Reserve, Marojejy National Park, Masoala National Park and Montagne d'Ambre National Park.
