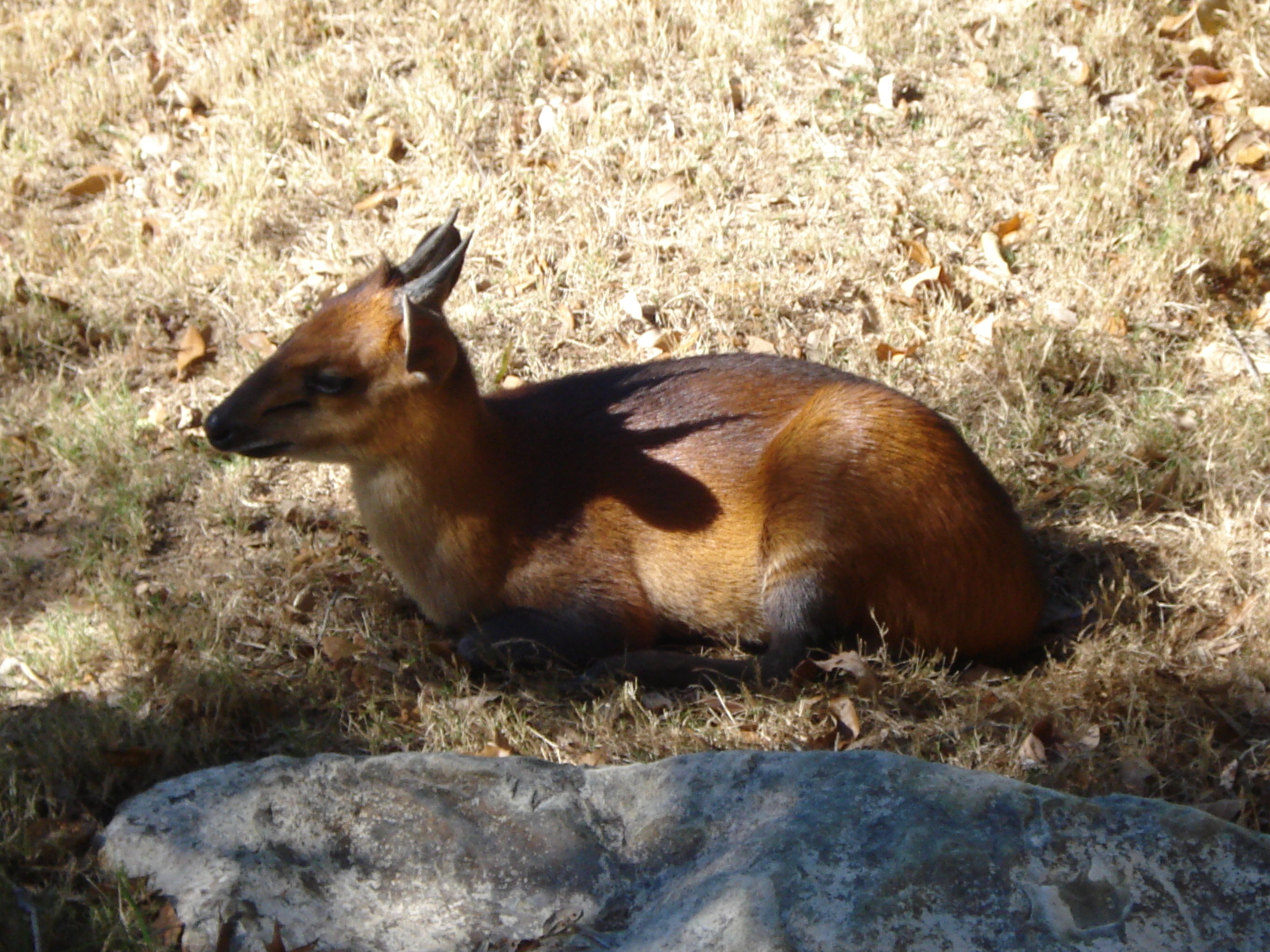
- At the Dallas Zoo, Texas

Conservation status
- Least Concern (IUCN 3.1)

Scientific classification
- Kingdom: Animalia
- Phylum: Chordata
- Class: Mammalia
- Order: Artiodactyla
- Family: Bovidae
- Subfamily: Antilopinae
- Genus: Cephalophorus
- Species: C. rufilatus

Binomial name
- Cephalophorus rufilatus Gray, 1846
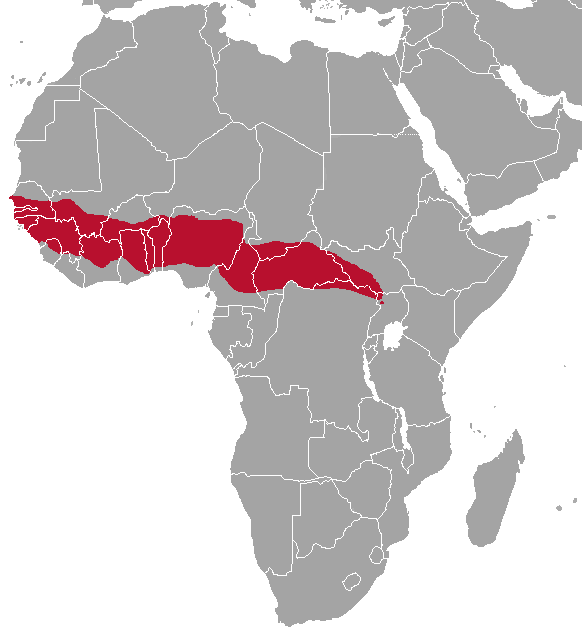
- Distribution of red-flanked duiker

= Red-flanked duiker =

Species of mammal

The red-flanked duiker (Cephalophorus rufilatus) is a species of small antelope found in western and central Africa in countries as far apart as Senegal and Sudan. The red-flanked duiker grows to almost 15 in (38 cm) in height and weighs up to 31 lb (14 kg). It has a russet coat, with greyish-black legs and backs, and white underbellies. It feeds on leaves, fallen fruits, seeds and flowers, and sometimes twigs and shoots. The adults are territorial, living in savannah and lightly wooded habitats, and the females usually produce a single offspring each year. They have lifespans of ten to fifteen years in captivity.

== Description ==
The red-flanked duiker is one of the smallest species of antelope, growing to a height of about 34 to 37 centimetres (13 to 15 in) with a weight of around 12 to 14 kilograms (26 to 31 lb). The head and body are blackish-grey near the spine gradually blending into a reddish-brown colour on the neck and flanks. There are small white markings on the ears and snout and a dark streak runs along the centre of the face. A tuft of black hairs grows between the horns and further coarse dark hairs grow along the top of the neck. The legs are bluish-grey. The sexes are in general similar in appearance but males have short backward-pointing horns up to 9 centimetres (3.5 in) long. Females are often hornless, or may have shorter horns. Both males and females have large preorbital glands on their snout in front of their eyes which form bulges in their cheeks. These are common to all members of the genus Cephalophus but they are larger in the red-flanked duiker than in other species.

== Distribution and habitat ==
The red-flanked duiker is native to West and Central Africa where its range extends from Senegal and the Gambia in the west to Sudan and the Nile Valley in the east. Its main habitat is open savannah woodlands and the margins of forests but it also occurs in river basins with elephant grass (Pennisetum purpureum) or thick shrubby vegetation such as caperbushes (Capparis spp.) and tree acanthus (Acanthus arboreus).

== Behaviour ==
The red-flanked duiker is territorial and mainly solitary, with a single antelope or a pair occupying a small territory for a few months and then moving elsewhere. The territory is marked with secretions from their preorbital glands. The duiker is most active in the early morning and shortly before dusk. It moves about while browsing and keep a sharp lookout for possible predators; if startled, it lowers its head and dives into the nearest dense area of vegetation. It is hunted by a number of predators including leopards (Panthera pardus), crowned eagles (Stephanoaetus coronatus) and African rock pythons (Python sebae) but is also hunted by humans, who probably kill more duikers than the other predators combined.

The red-flanked duiker feeds on leaves and flowers and the fruits that fall from trees, and also browses on twigs growing within 1 metre (1 yd) of the ground. Favoured food species include the wild date palm (Phoenix reclinata), the African peach (Nauclea latifolia), the Cape fig (Ficus capensis), the wild bauhinia (Piliostigma thonningii), the adanme (Mucuna flagellipes), the hog plum (Spondias mombin), the barwood (Pterocarpus erinaceus), the mitzeeri (Bridelia micrantha), the wild African black plum (Vitex doniana), the African custard-apple (Annona senegalensis), the leafflower (Phyllanthus muellerianus), the monkey cola (Cola millenii), the ackee (Blighia sapida) and the beechwood (Gmelina arborea). As the red-flanked duiker eats the fruit of the Cape fig, African peach and wild date, it swallows the seeds. These pass through the gut and are present in the droppings and this is likely to be an important means of seed dispersal for these species.

Both male and female red-flanked duikers mature at about nine months of age. The female comes into oestrus once a year and the gestation period is about eight months, with a single offspring being born in the dry season or near the start of the wet season. The newly born juvenile weighs about 1 kilogram (2.2 lb) and quickly makes its way into concealing vegetation, only coming out when its mother returns to nurse it. Immediately after birth and when grooming its infant, the mother marks it with the secretions from her preorbital glands. It is weaned when it weighs about 9 kilograms (20 lb) and there is no further parental involvement.

== Status ==
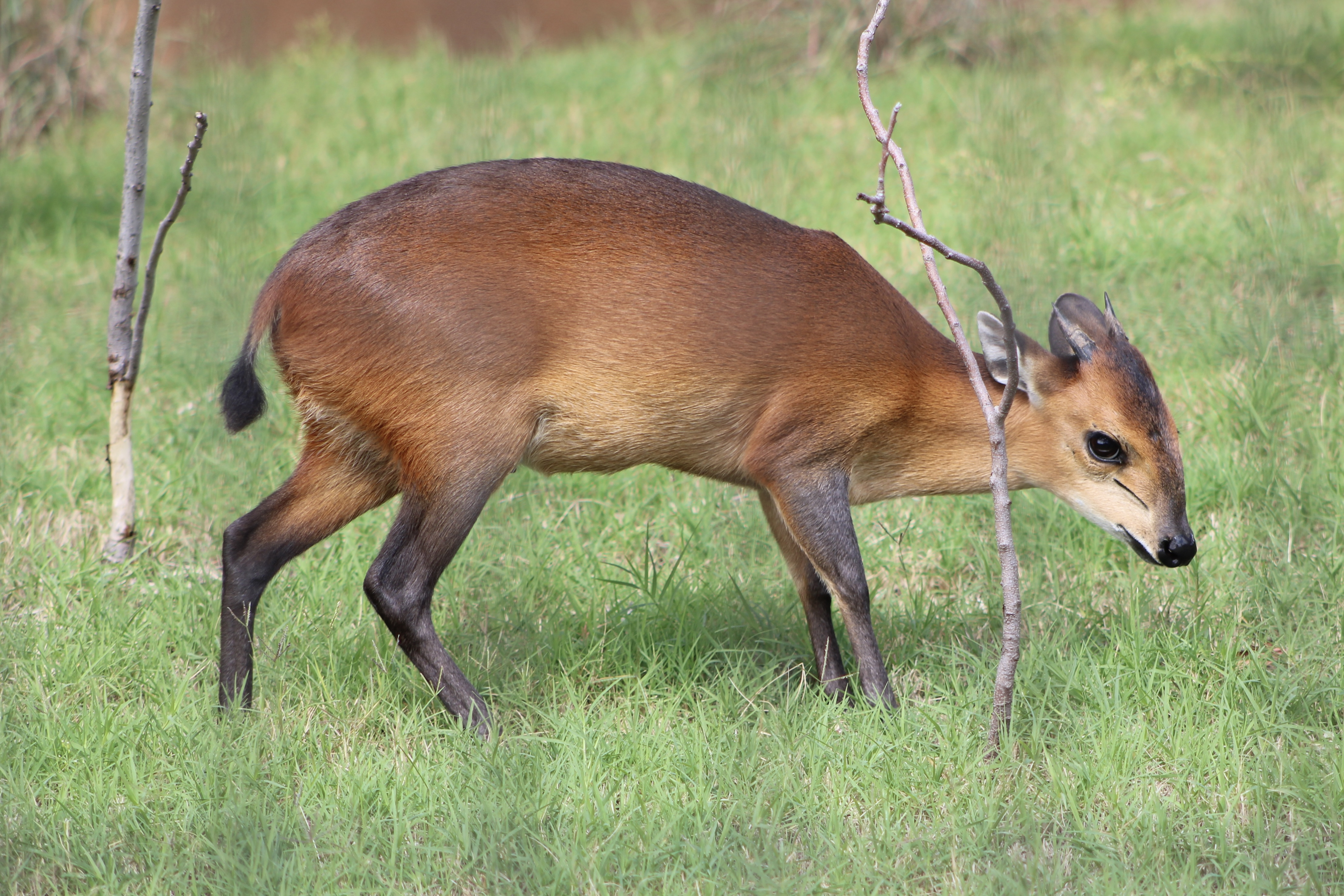
Taken at the Oklahoma City Zoo, US, September 2025

The red-flanked duiker is an adaptable species, and the removal of trees by logging and the conversion of its natural habitat into more open savannah and farmland has allowed it to increase its range. It is fairly common in the areas in which it is found though numbers are decreasing in general due to severe hunting pressure. The red-flanked duiker was one of the four most frequent species of bushmeat on sale in the Republic of Guinea, along with Maxwell's duiker (Cephalophus maxwelli), the greater cane rat (Thryonomys swinderianus) and the bushbuck (Tragelaphus scriptus). However it occurs in a number of reserves and protected areas where it is less liable to be killed for meat and the International Union for Conservation of Nature in its Red List of Threatened Species lists it as being of "Least Concern".
