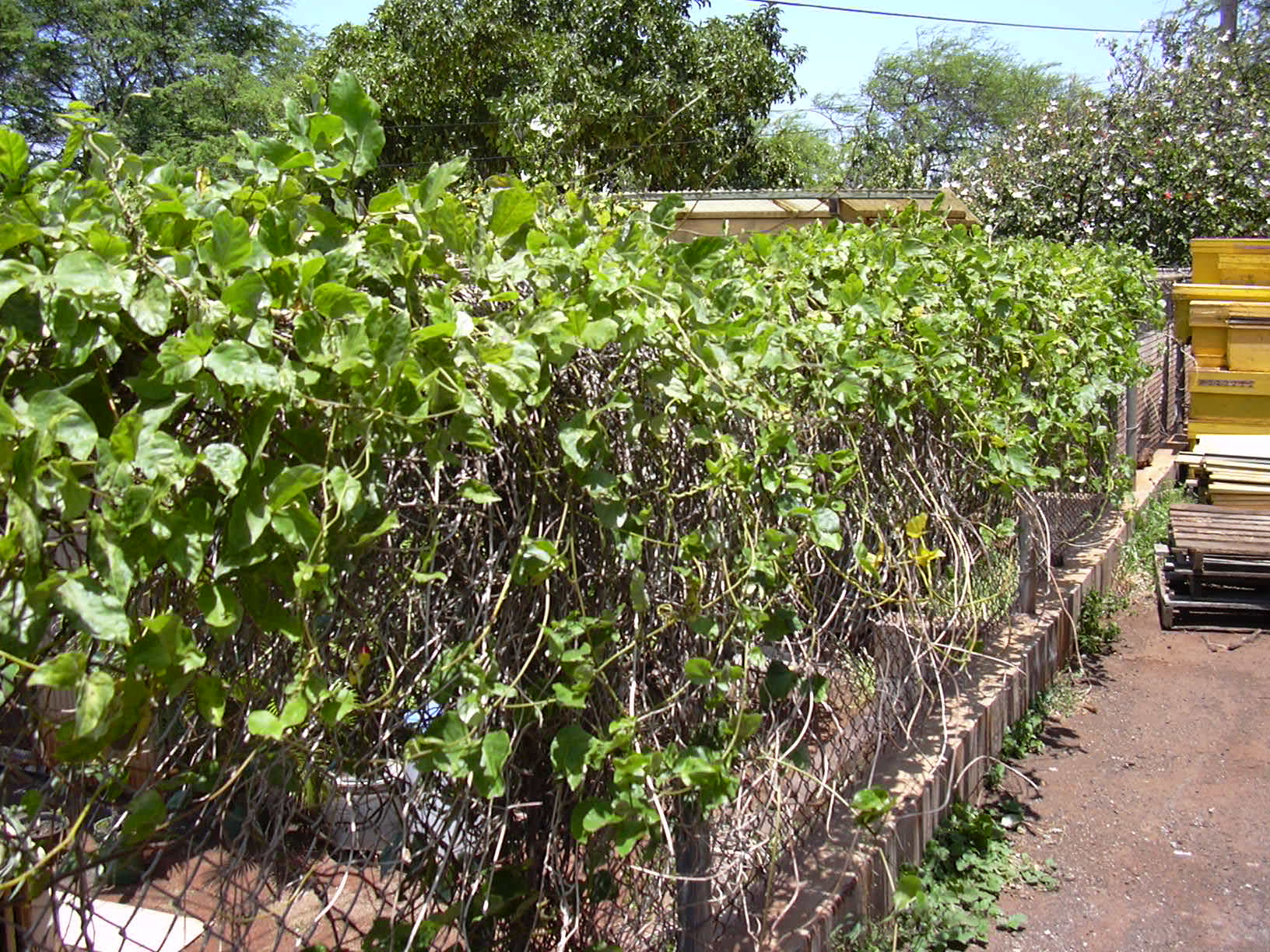

Scientific classification
- Kingdom: Plantae
- Clade: Tracheophytes
- Clade: Angiosperms
- Clade: Eudicots
- Clade: Rosids
- Order: Fabales
- Family: Fabaceae
- Subfamily: Faboideae
- Genus: Mucuna
- Species: M. urens

Binomial name
- Mucuna urens (L.) Medik.

Synonyms
- List: Cacuvallum altissimus Medik.; Canavalia altissima (Jacq.) Macfad.; Clitoria zoophthalmum L.; Dolichos altissimus Jacq.; Dolichos urens L.; Hornera altissima (Jacq.) Neck.; Hornera urens (L.) Neck.; Labradia urens (L.) Swediaur; Mucuna altissima (Jacq.) DC.; Mucuna altissima var. pilosula Benth.; Mucuna umbellata Salzm. ex Benth.; Negretia sericea Willd. ex Steud.; Negretia urens (L.) Tussac; Stizolobium altissimum (Jacq.) Pers.; Stizolobium urens (L.) Pers.

= Mucuna urens =

Species of plant

Mucuna urens is a species of large liana from the family Fabaceae. The plant is native to tropical Central and South America, and has been introduced into the Republic of the Congo. Common names include horse-eye bean and ox-eye bean.

== Taxonomy ==
The word mucuna is the vernacular name for Mucuna urens in an indigenous language of Brazil, and in 1763 this word was chosen by the French botanist Michel Adanson in his Familles naturelles des plantes to be the generic epithet for this genus of legumes, although M. urens was itself known as Dolichos urens until being transferred to Mucuna many years later.

== Description ==
Mucuna urens is a large, vigorous, much-branched, twining liana that climbs into the tree canopy. The stems are thick and soft, and bear alternate, trifoliate leaves with petioles up to 15 cm (6 in) long. The leaflets are ovate or elliptical, and up to 15 cm (6 in) long; the lateral leaflets are somewhat oblique, and all leaflets have rounded bases and apiculate tips. The inflorescences grow laterally or in the axils of the leaves and are pendulous racemes with peduncles up to a metre long, with the flowering part near the tip. The calyx has a 1 cm (0.4 in) long tube and the petals are thick, waxy and yellowish. The standard is slightly longer than the wings and keel. The flowers are followed by transversely-ridged, oblong pods about 15 cm × 5 cm (6 in × 2 in) bearing orange-brown bristly stinging hairs; the pods have a suture underneath and two longitudinal, undulating wings. The one to four seeds are rounded, almost surrounded by hilum and 2.5 cm (1 in) or more in diameter.

== Distribution and habitat ==
This liana is native to the West Indies, Central and South America, its range extending from Panama to Peru, Ecuador, Bolivia and Brazil. It grows in forests and woodland at altitudes of up to 1,800 m (6,000 ft).

== Uses ==
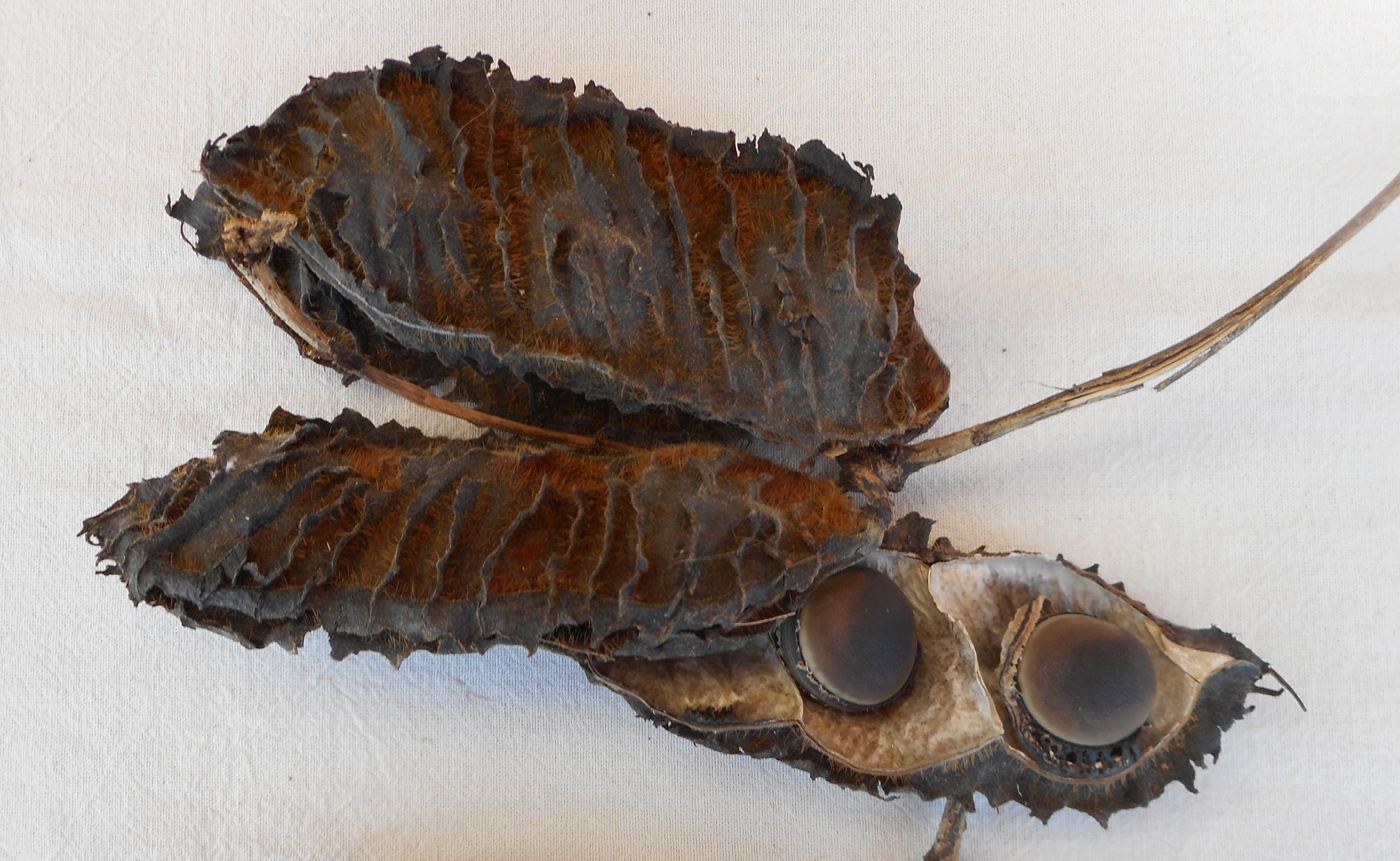
Pods with seeds

Mucuna urens is used in traditional medicine. A tincture made from the powdered bean macerated in alcohol is a soothing remedy used against hemorrhoids, especially those inclined to bleed. The stinging hairs that grow on the pods can be taken internally against intestinal worms, which are expelled alive. These hairs are irritating to the skin and cause intense itching, with reddening and the formation of tiny pustules, soon after contact; the active chemical is the proteolytic enzyme, mucunain.

Potable water can be obtained from the fleshy stems. Fibres from the stem are used to make strong rope, and the seeds are used to make beads and ornaments, as well as being used as famine food. An extract of the seeds given to male guinea pigs at low dosages was found to cause the degeneration of sperm, raising the possibility that the plant could be used as a male anti-fertility agent.
