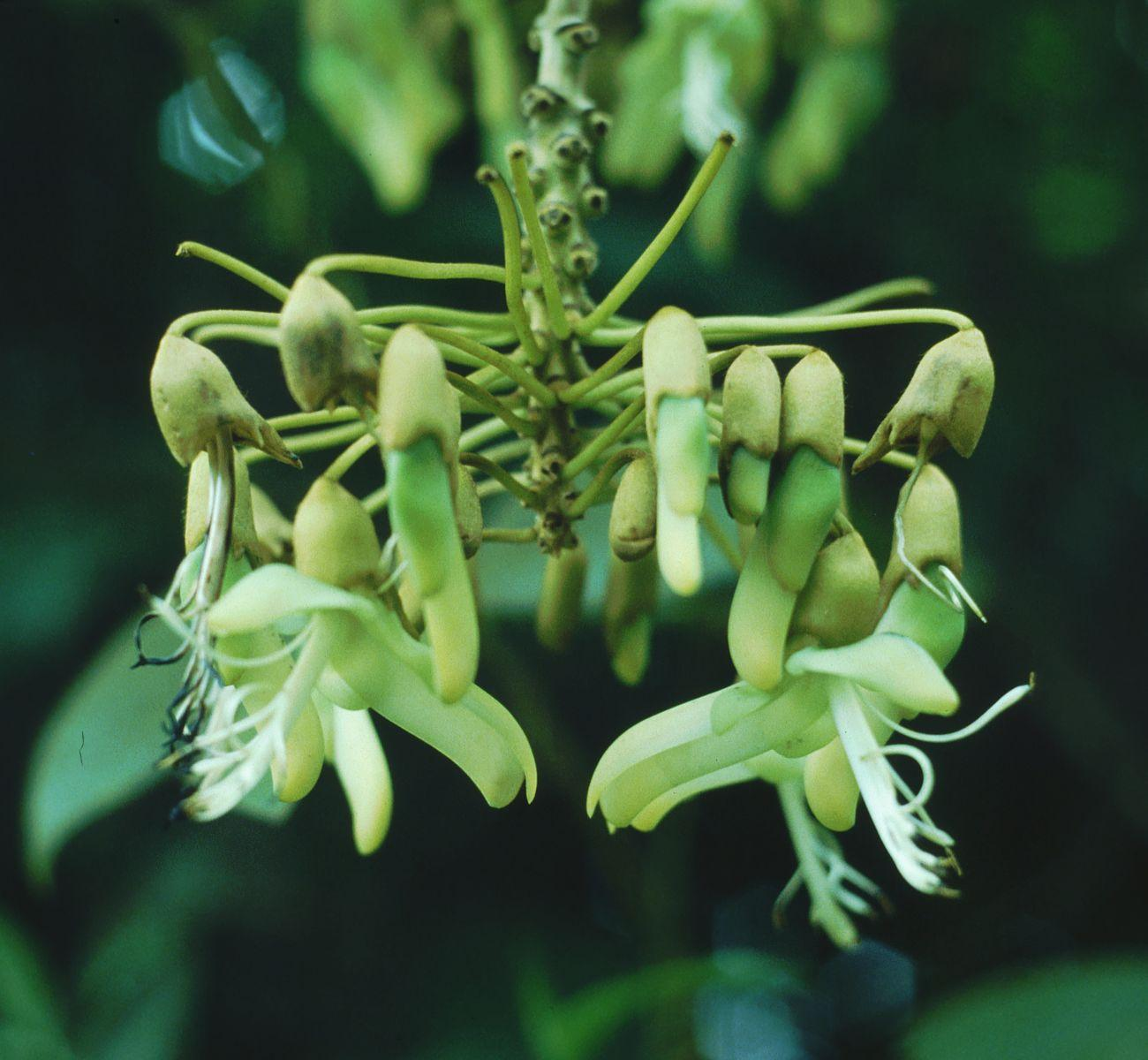
- Mucuna holtonii flowers

Scientific classification
- Kingdom: Plantae
- Clade: Tracheophytes
- Clade: Angiosperms
- Clade: Eudicots
- Clade: Rosids
- Order: Fabales
- Family: Fabaceae
- Subfamily: Faboideae
- Clade: Millettioids
- Tribe: Phaseoleae
- Genus: Mucuna; Adans.

Type species
- Mucuna urens (L.) Medik.

Species
- 112 – see text

Synonyms
- 11 synonyms: Hornera Neck. ex A.Juss. nom. superfl.; Cacuvallum Medik.; Carpopogon Roxb. ex Spreng.; Citta Lour.; Labradia Swediaur; Macranthus Lour.; Macroceratides Raddi; Negretia Ruiz & Pav.; Pillera Endl.; Stizolobium P.Browne nom. rej.; Zoophthalmum P.Browne

= Mucuna =

Genus of plants

Mucuna is a genus of vines and shrubs of the legume family Fabaceae: tribe Phaseoleae. It has a pan-tropical distribution and contains 112 accepted species as of July 2025. The genus was created in 1763 by French botanist Michel Adanson.

== Description ==
Plants in this genus are mostly woody or herbaceous vines, with the exception of M. stans, a shrub. The leaves are stipulate and trifoliate with large leaflets. Inflorescences are produced from the leaf axils or from older stems, and all except those of M. stans and M. stanleyi are pendant; they may be arranged as pseudo-racemes or pseudo-panicles. The flowers have the characteristic pea flower form; they are large and showy and exhibit a wide range of colours across the different species. The fruit are dehiscent pods that may be ovoid or oblong and contain a number of seeds; they have divisions (septa) between each seed, the pod may be winged and/or ribbed, and they are often coated in stiff irritating hairs.

They are generally bat-pollinated and produce seeds that are buoyant sea-beans. These have a characteristic three-layered appearance, appearing like the eyes of a large mammal in some species and like a hamburger in others (most notably M. sloanei) and giving rise to common names like deer-eye beans, donkey-eye beans, ox-eye beans, or hamburger seed.

The name of the genus is derived from mucunã, a Tupi–Guarani word for these species.

== Ecology ==
Some Mucuna species are used as food plants by caterpillars of Lepidoptera. These include Morpho butterflies and the two-barred flasher (Astraptes fulgerator), which is sometimes found on M. holtonii and perhaps others. The plant pathogenic fungus Mycosphaerella mucunae is named for being first discovered on Mucuna.

== Uses ==
The pods of some species are covered in coarse hairs that contain the proteolytic enzyme mucunain and cause itchy blisters when they come in contact with skin; specific epithets such as pruriens (Latin: "itching") or urens (Latinized Ancient Greek: "stinging like a nettle") refer to this. Other parts of the plant have medicinal properties. The plants or their extracts are sold in herbalism against a range of conditions, such as urinary tract, neurological, and menstruation disorders, constipation, edema, fevers, tuberculosis, and helminthiases such as elephantiasis. In an experiment to test if M.pruriens might have an effect on the symptoms of Parkinson's disease, Katzenschlager et al. found that a seed powder had a comparable, if not more favourable, effect as commercial formulations of L-dopa, although the trial only consisted of four people per test group.

M. pruriens was found to increase phosphorus availability after application of rock phosphate in one Nigerian experiment. M. pruriens was used in Native American milpa agriculture.

Mucuna seeds contain a large number of antinutritional compounds. The most important is L-dopa, which the digestive system of most animals confuses with the amino acid tyrosine, causing the production of defective proteins. Other antinutrients are tannins, lectins, phytic acid, cyanogenic glycosides, and trypsin and amylase inhibitors, although all these can be removed by long cooking. M. pruriens may also contain chemicals such as serotonin, 5-HTP, nicotine, and the hallucinogenic tryptamines 5-MeO-DMT, bufotenine and dimethyltryptamine, Mucuna is not traditionally consumed as a food crop, but some preliminary experiments have shown that if the antinutrients are removed or at least brought down to safe level, the beans can be fed to livestock or people. The L-dopa content is the most important and difficult toxin to get rid of. The seeds must be extensively processed before they can be safely eaten. Diallo & Berhe found the best method was to crack open the seeds and soak them in constantly running fresh water such as under an open faucet for 36 hours, or to put them in a bag and leave in a flowing river for 72 hours, before cooking them for over an hour. Over a thousand people in the Republic of Guinea were fed a meal of Mucuna (mixed with many other ingredients) with no obvious ill effects.

== Species ==
As of February 2025, Plants of the World Online accepts the following 112 species:

- Mucuna acuminata Graham ex Baker
- Mucuna aimun Wiriad.
- Mucuna analuciana T.M.Moura, Mansano & A.M.G.Azevedo
- Mucuna angustifolia Adema
- Mucuna argentea T.M.Moura, G.P.Lewis & A.M.G.Azevedo
- Mucuna argyrophylla Standl.
- Mucuna atropurpurea (Roxb.) DC. ex Wight
- Mucuna aurea C.B.Rob.
- Mucuna bennettii F.Muell.
- Mucuna biplicata Teijsm. & Binn. ex Kurz
- Mucuna birdwoodiana Tutcher
- Mucuna bodinieri H.Lév.
- Mucuna brachycarpa Rech.
- Mucuna bracteata DC. ex Kurz
- Mucuna cajamarca T.M.Moura, G.P.Lewis & A.M.G.Azevedo
- Mucuna calophylla W.W.Sm.
- Mucuna canaliculata Verdc.
- Mucuna championii Benth.
- Mucuna chiapaneca M.Sousa & T.M.Moura
- Mucuna coriacea Baker
- Mucuna cuatrecasasii Hern.Cam. & C.Barbosa ex L.K.Ruíz
- Mucuna curranii Elmer
- Mucuna cyclocarpa F.P.Metcalf
- Mucuna diabolica Backer
- Mucuna diplax Wilmot-Dear
- Mucuna discolor Merr. & L.M.Perry
- Mucuna ecuatoriana T.M.Moura, G.P.Lewis, Mansano & A.M.G.Azevedo
- Mucuna elliptica DC.
- Mucuna elmeri Merr.
- Mucuna eurylamellata Adema
- Mucuna flagellipes Vogel ex Hook.f.
- Mucuna gigantea (Willd.) DC.
- Mucuna glabra (Reinecke) Wilmot-Dear
- Mucuna glabrialata (Hauman) Verdc.
- Mucuna globulifera T.M.Moura, N.Zamora & A.M.G.Azevedo
- Mucuna gracilipes Craib
- Mucuna guangxiensis K.W.Jiang & Y.Feng Huang
- Mucuna hainanensis Hayata
- Mucuna havilandii Wiriad.
- Mucuna hirtipetala Wilmot-Dear & R.Sha
- Mucuna holtonii (Kuntze) Moldenke
- Mucuna hooglandii Verdc.
- Mucuna humblotii Drake
- Mucuna imbricata (Roxb. ex Lindl.) DC. ex Loudon
- Mucuna incurvata Wilmot-Dear & R.Sha
- Mucuna interrupta Gagnep.
- Mucuna jarocha T.M.Moura, Mansano, Gereau & A.M.G.Azevedo
- Mucuna kabaenensis Adema
- Mucuna kawakabuti Wiriad.
- Mucuna keyensis Burck
- Mucuna killipiana Hern.Cam. & C.Barbosa
- Mucuna klitgaardiae T.M.Moura, G.P.Lewis & A.M.G.Azevedo
- Mucuna kostermansii Wiriad.
- Mucuna lamellata Wilmot-Dear
- Mucuna lamii Verdc.
- Mucuna laticifera Ingalh., N.V.Page & S.S.Gaikwad
- Mucuna longipedunculata Merr.
- Mucuna macrobotrys Hance
- Mucuna macrocarpa Wall.
- Mucuna macrophylla Miq.
- Mucuna macropoda Baker f.
- Mucuna manongarivensis Du Puy & Labat
- Mucuna melanocarpa Hochst. ex A.Rich.
- Mucuna membranacea Hayata
- Mucuna mindorensis Merr.
- Mucuna mitis (Ruiz & Pav.) DC.
- Mucuna mollis (Kunth) DC.
- Mucuna mollissima Teijsm. & Binn. ex Kurz
- Mucuna monosperma DC. ex Wight
- Mucuna monticola N.Zamora, T.M.Moura & A.M.G.Azevedo
- Mucuna mooneyi T.M.Moura, Gereau & G.P.Lewis
- Mucuna mutisiana (Kunth) DC.
- Mucuna neocaledonica Baker f.
- Mucuna novoguineensis Scheff.
- Mucuna occidentalis (Hepper) T.M.Moura & G.P.Lewis
- Mucuna oligoplax Niyomdham & Wilmot-Dear
- Mucuna pachycarpa Parreno ex Wilmot-Dear
- Mucuna pacifica Hosok.
- Mucuna pallida Cordem.
- Mucuna paniculata Baker
- Mucuna papuana Adema
- Mucuna persericea (Wilmot-Dear) T.M.Moura & A.M.G.Azevedo
- Mucuna pesa De Wild.
- Mucuna platyphylla A.Gray
- Mucuna platyplekta Quisumb. & Merr.
- Mucuna poggei Taub.
- Mucuna pruriens (L.) DC.
- Mucuna pseudoelliptica T.M.Moura, G.P.Lewis & A.M.G.Azevedo
- Mucuna pungens (Vell.) H.F.Menezes & J.F.B.Pastore
- Mucuna reptans Verdc.
- Mucuna reticulata Burck
- Mucuna revoluta Wilmot-Dear
- Mucuna rostrata Benth.
- Mucuna sakapipei Wiriad.
- Mucuna samarensis Merr.
- Mucuna sanjappae Aitawade & S.R.Yadav
- Mucuna schlechteri Harms
- Mucuna sempervirens Hemsl.
- Mucuna sericophylla Perkins
- Mucuna sloanei Fawc. & Rendle
- Mucuna stanleyi C.T.White
- Mucuna stans Welw. ex Baker
- Mucuna stenoplax Wilmot-Dear
- Mucuna subumbellata Wilmot-Dear
- Mucuna sumbawaensis Wiriad.
- Mucuna tapantiana N.Zamora & T.M.Moura
- Mucuna thailandica Niyomdham & Wilmot-Dear
- Mucuna tomentosa K.Schum.
- Mucuna toppingii Merr.
- Mucuna urens (L.) Medik.
- Mucuna verdcourtii Wiriad.
- Mucuna warburgii K.Schum. & Lauterb.

=== Formerly placed here ===
- Canavalia mattogrossensis (Barb. Rodr.) Malme (as M. mattegrossensis Barb. Rodr.)
- Psophocarpus scandens (Endl.) Verdc. (as M. comorensis Vatke)

== Gallery ==
=== Flowers ===
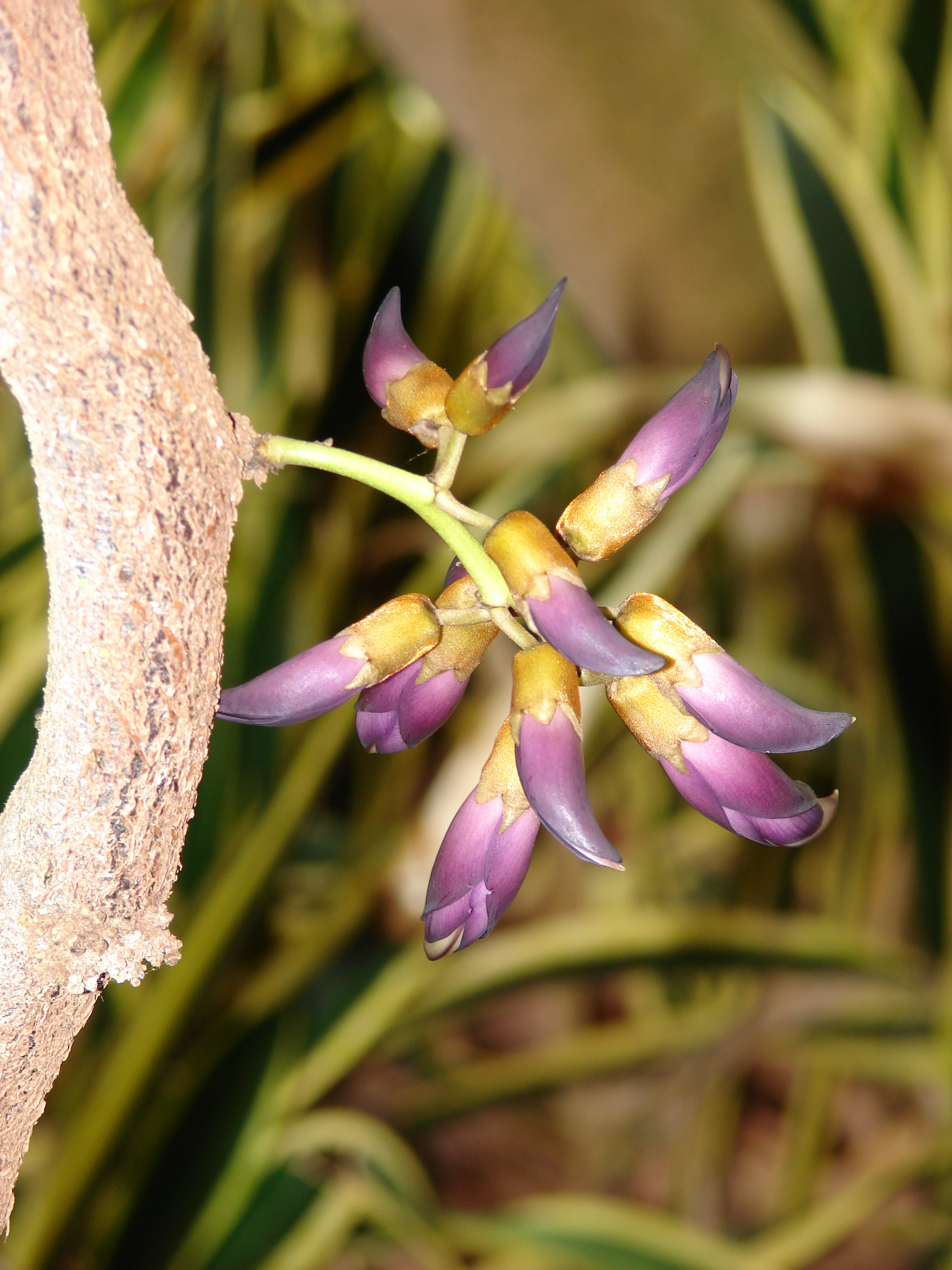
Mucuna nigricans

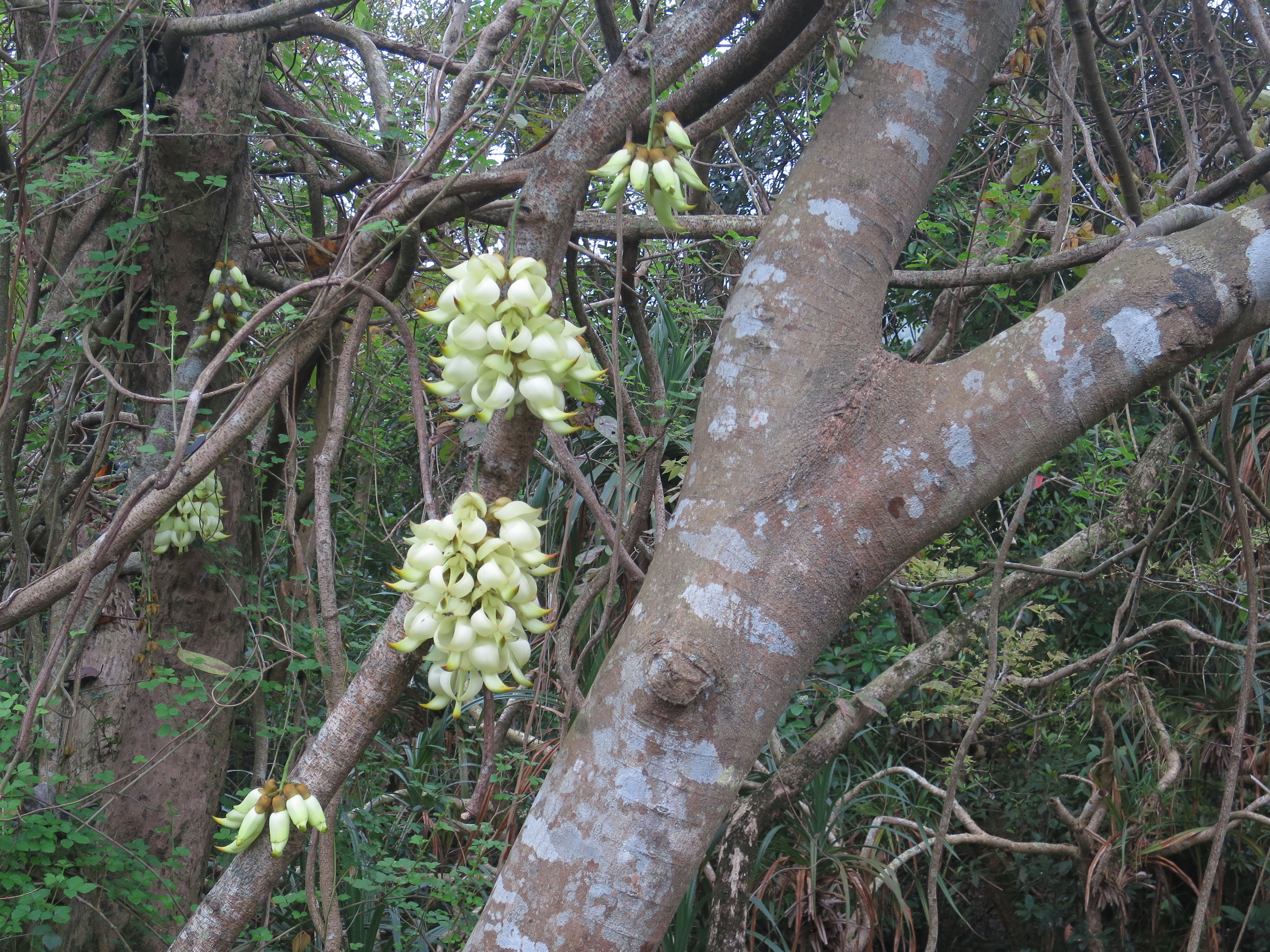
Mucuna birdwoodiana

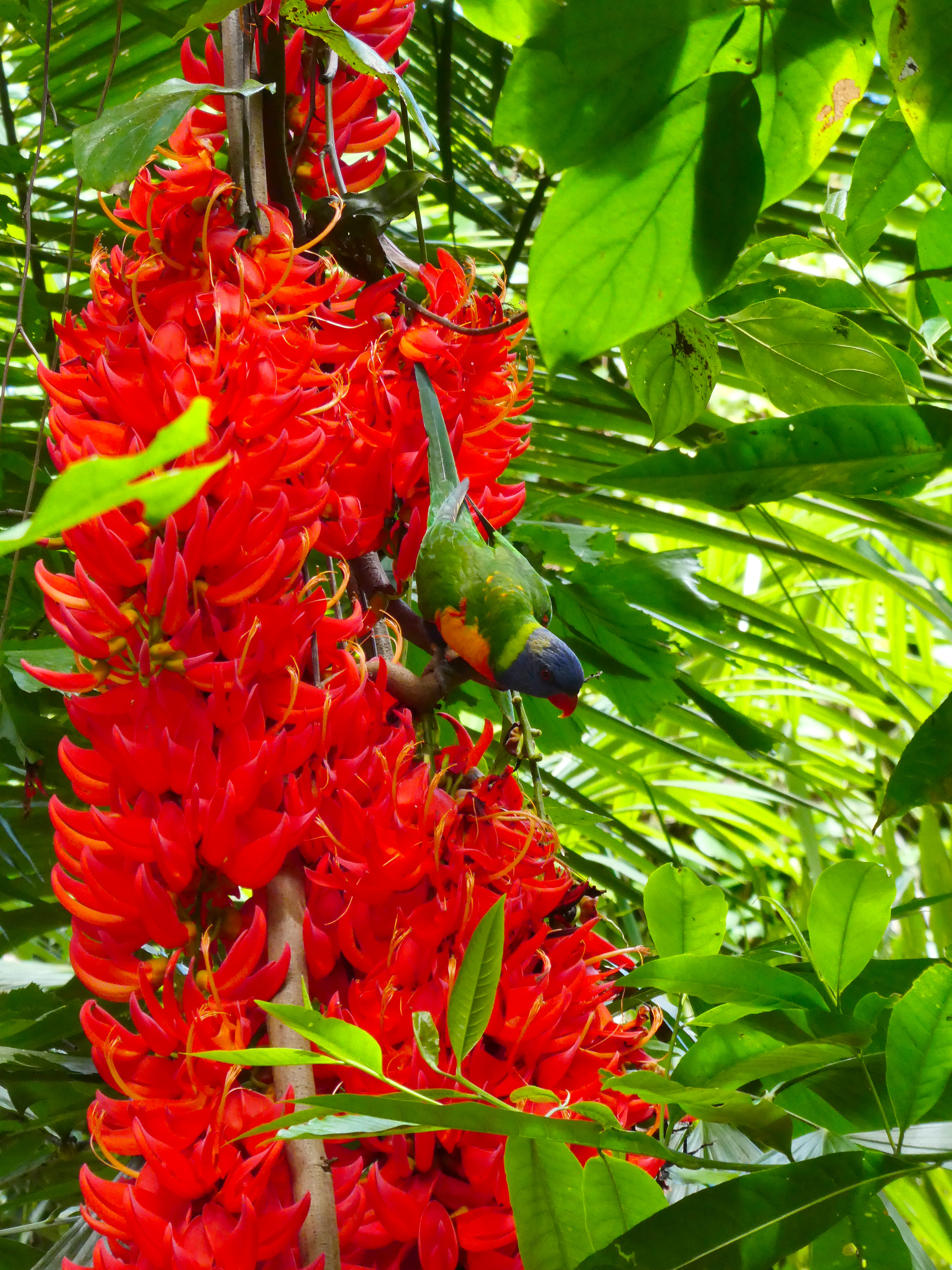
Mucuna bennettii with a Rainbow Lorikeet

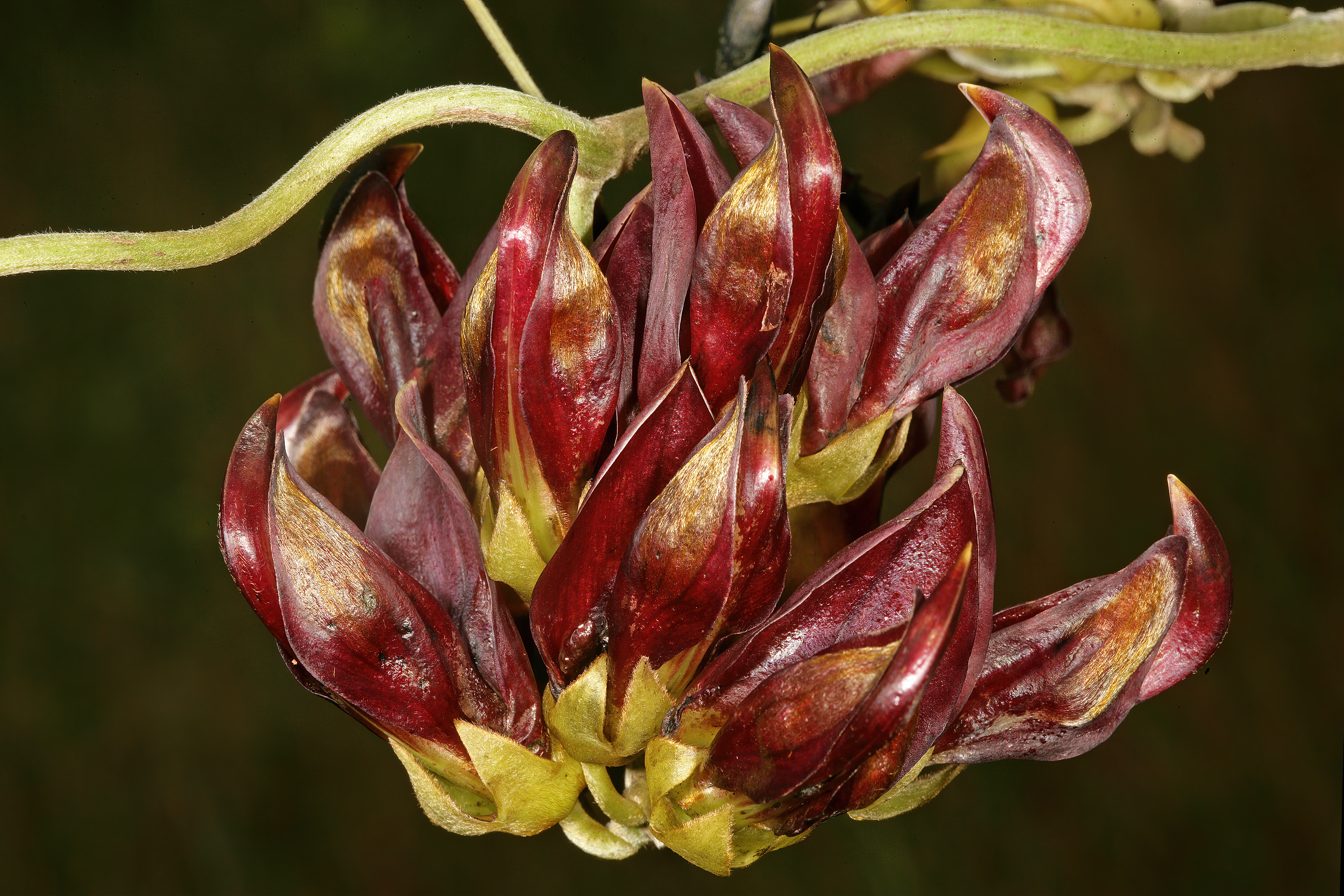
Mucuna coriacea

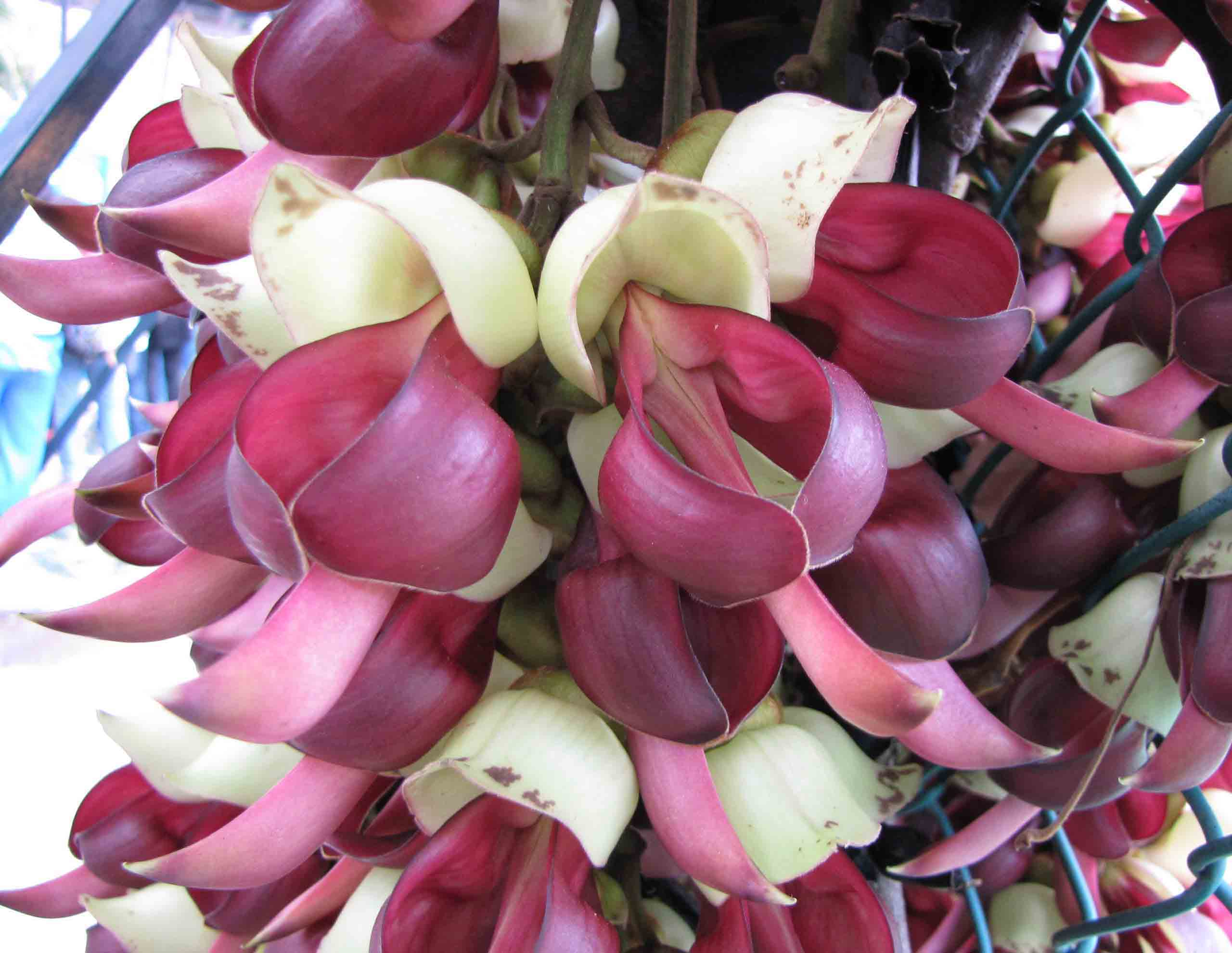
Mucuna macrocarpa

=== Seed pods ===
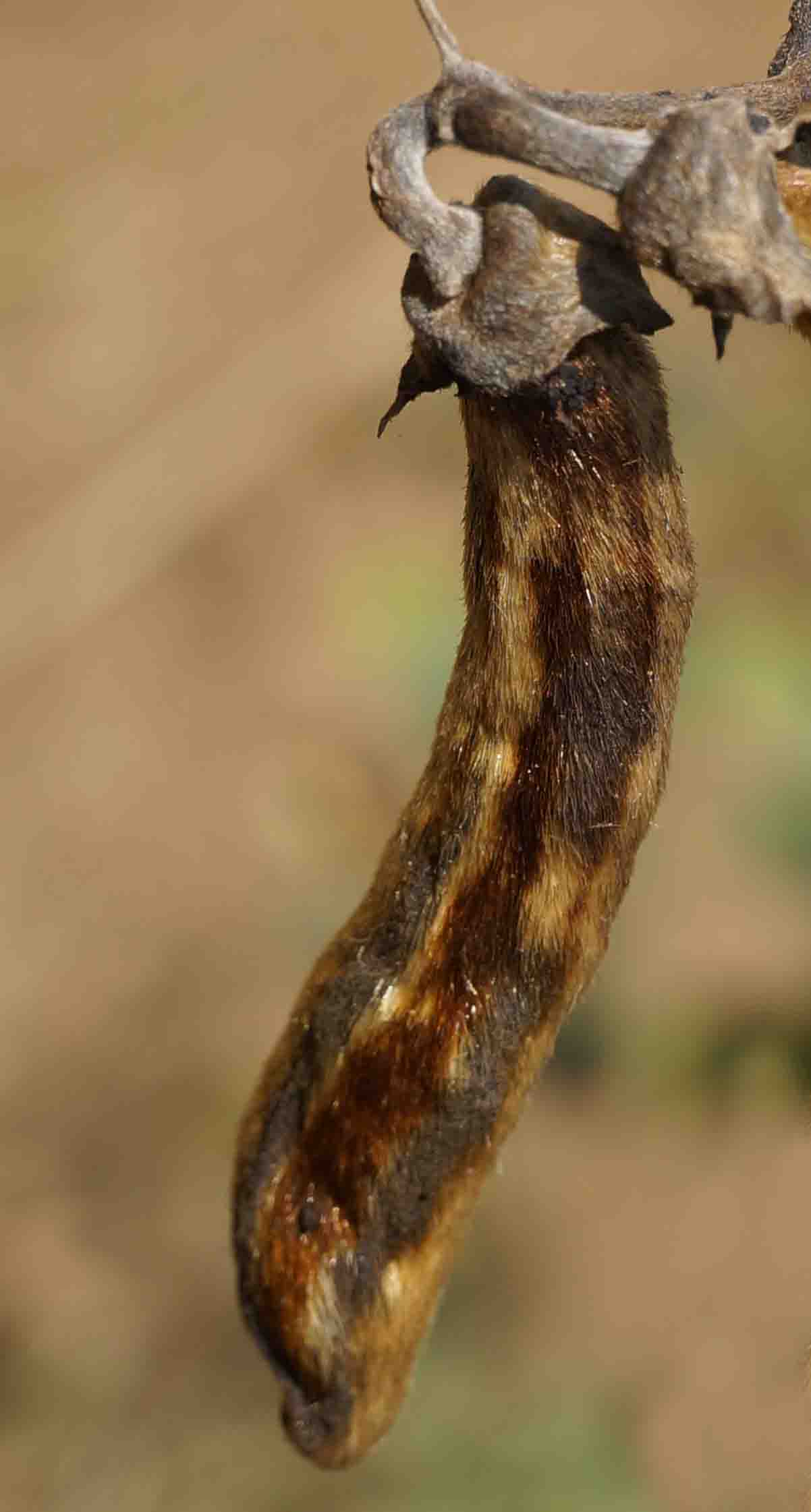
Mucuna sanjappae

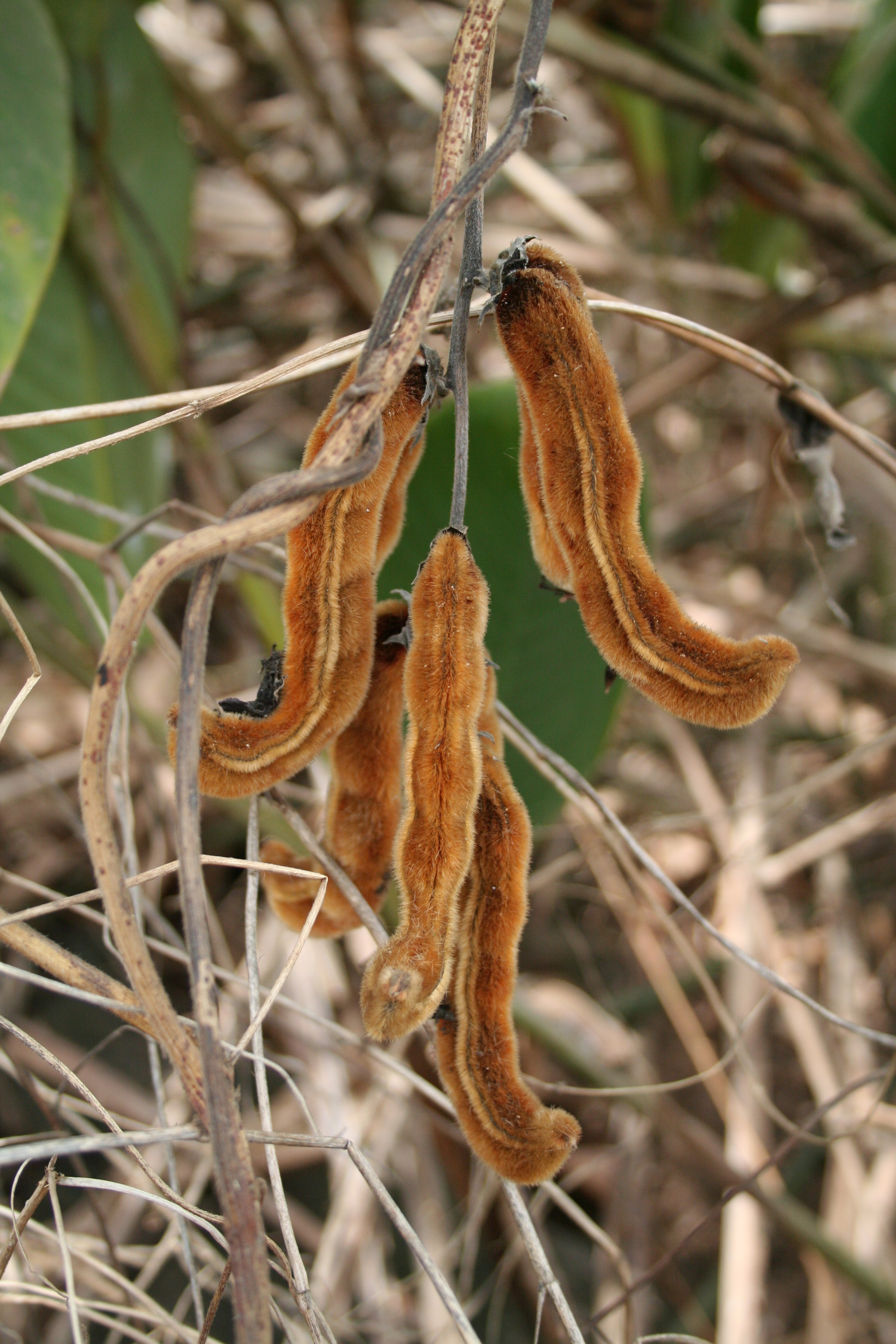
Mucuna poggei

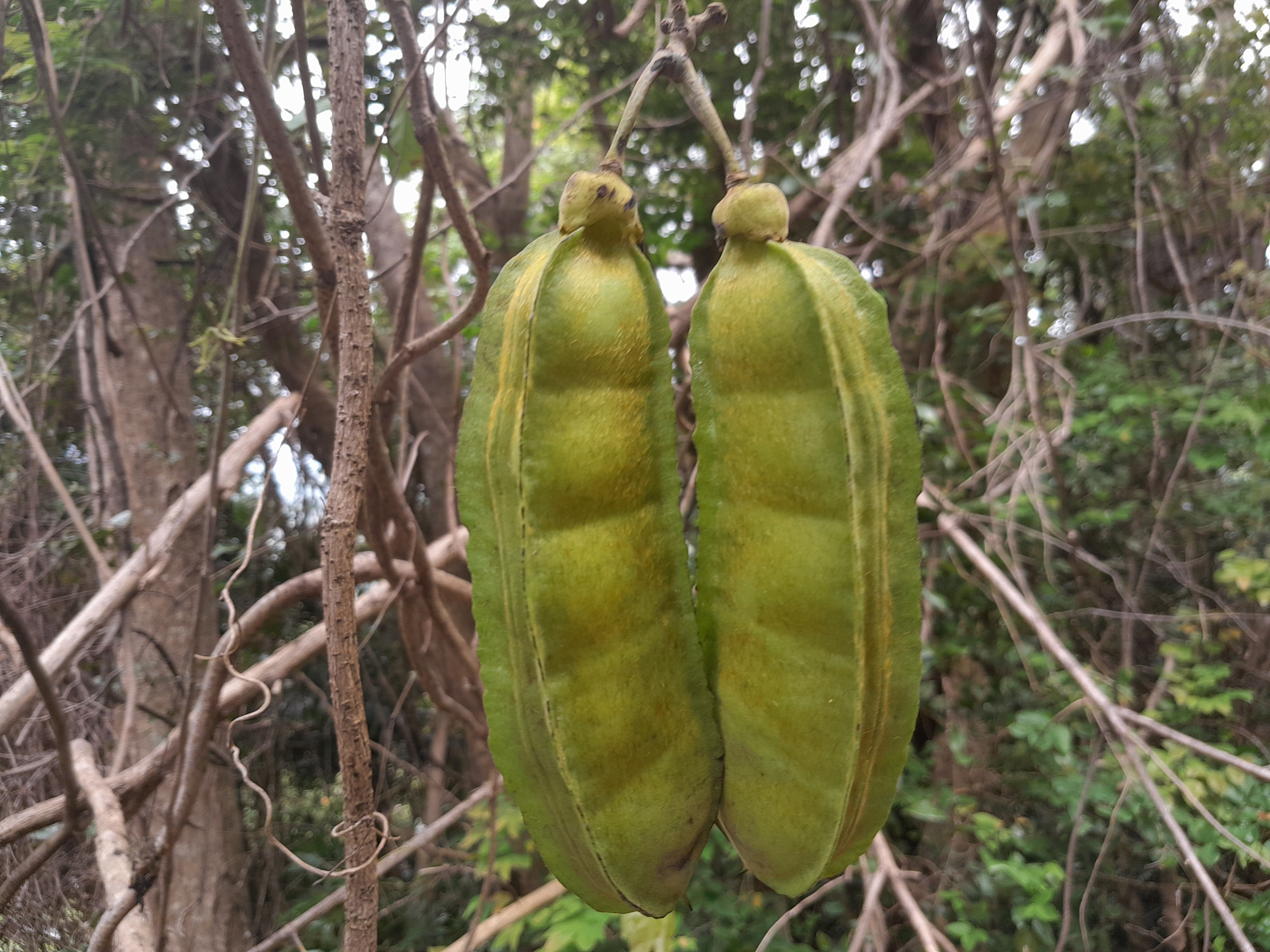
Mucuna gigantea

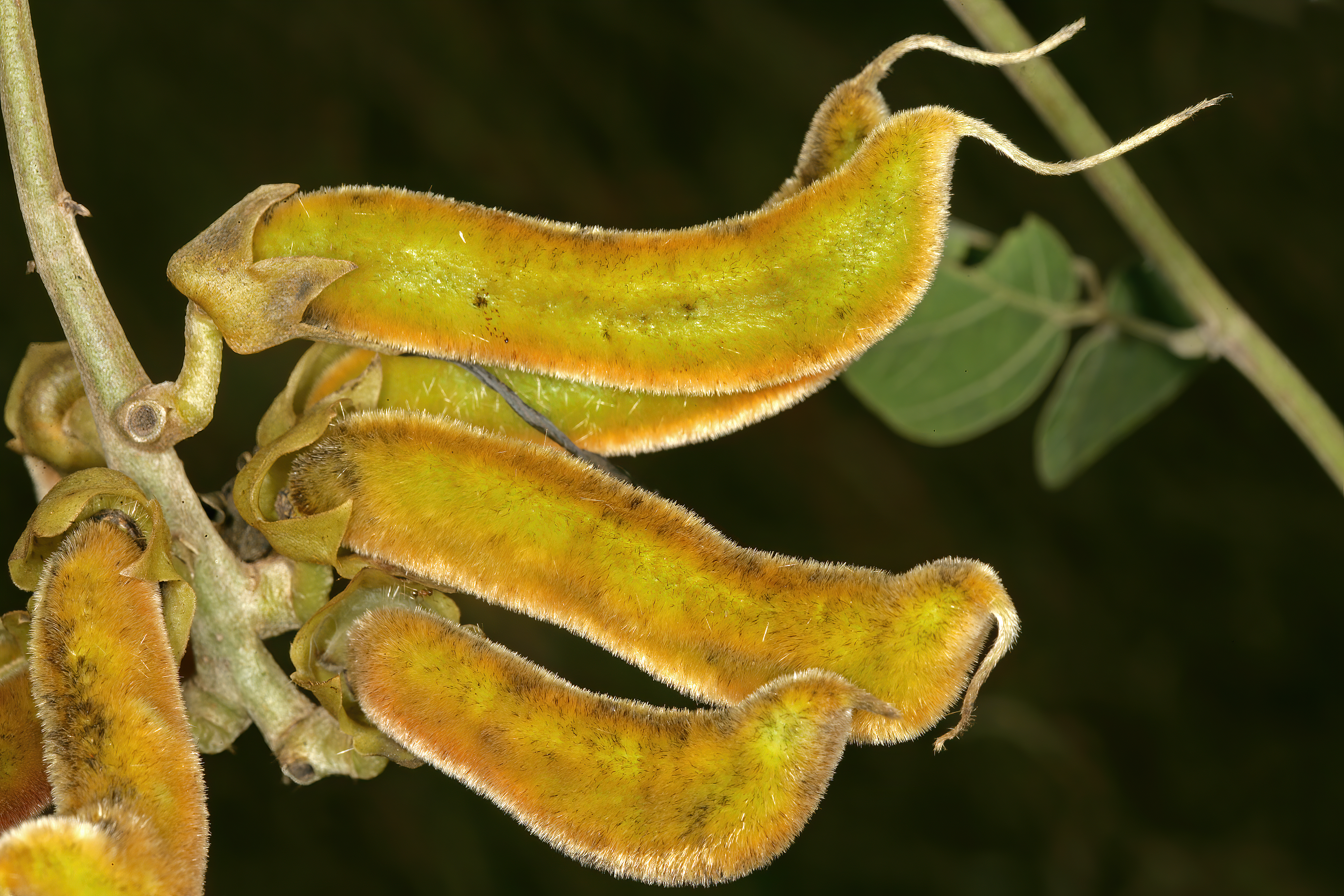
Mucuna coriacea

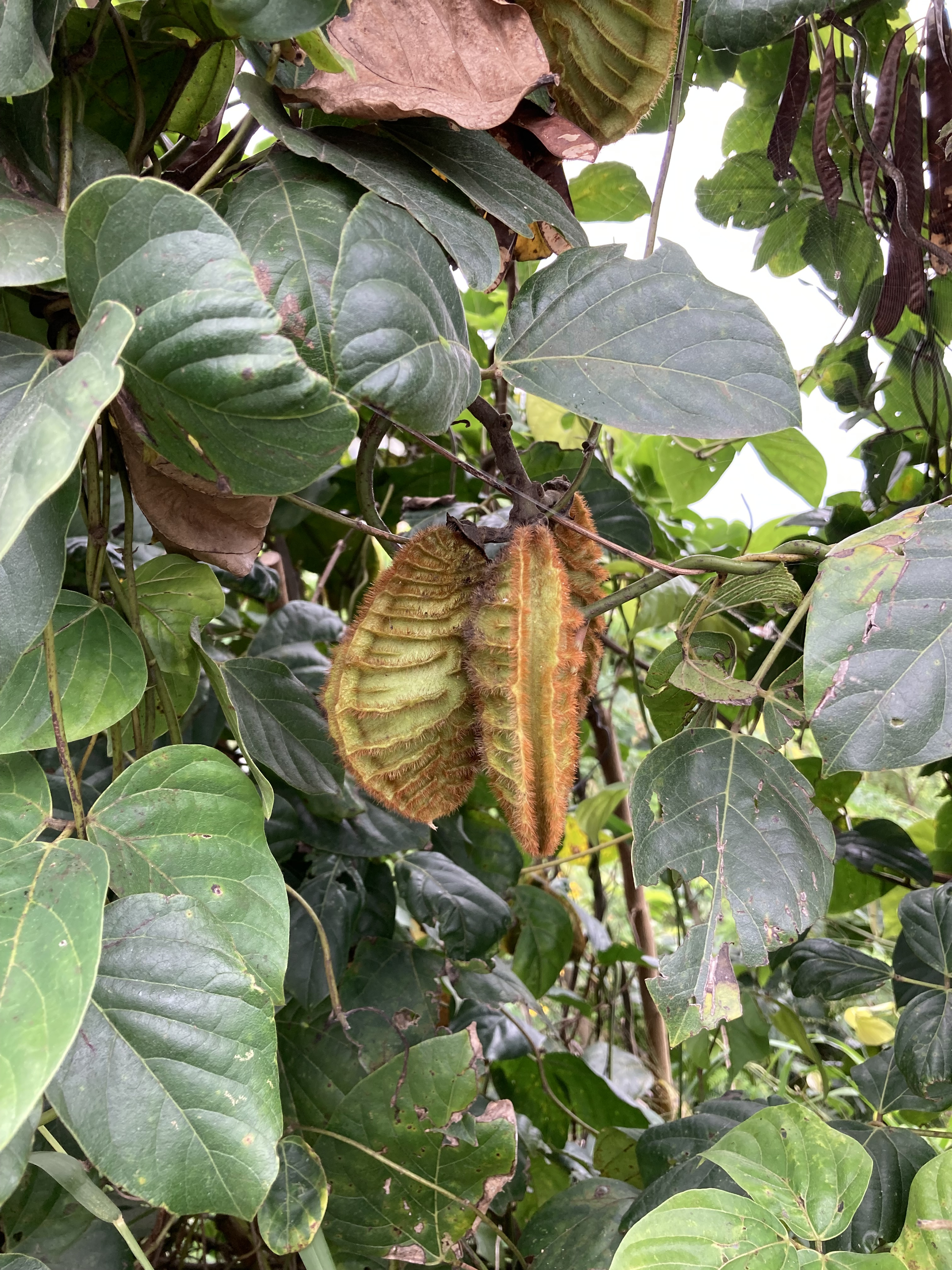
Mucuna membranacea
