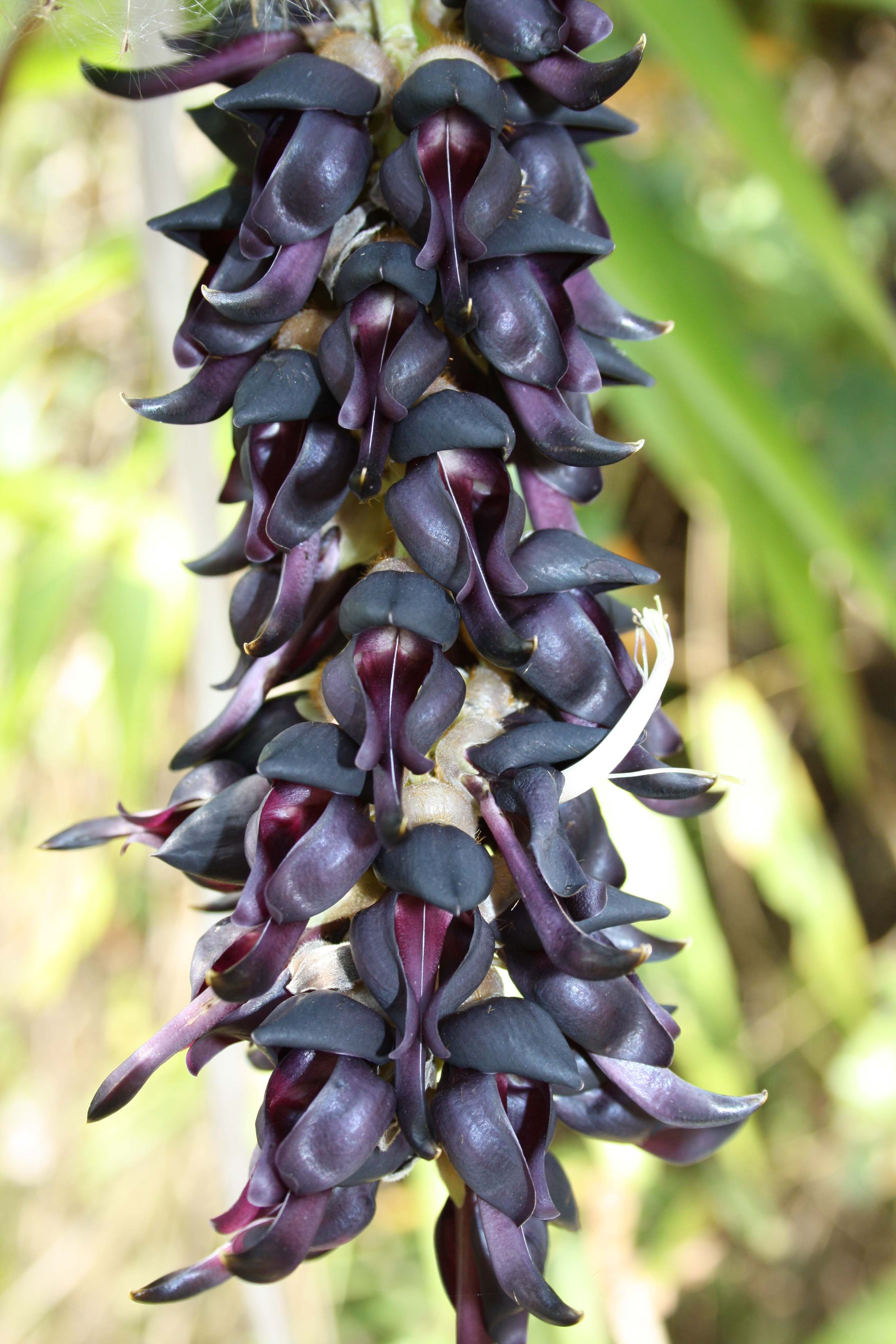
- Mucuna pruriens inflorescence

Scientific classification
- Kingdom: Plantae
- Clade: Tracheophytes
- Clade: Angiosperms
- Clade: Eudicots
- Clade: Rosids
- Order: Fabales
- Family: Fabaceae
- Subfamily: Faboideae
- Genus: Mucuna
- Species: M. pruriens

Binomial name
Mucuna pruriens
(L.) DC.
Synonyms
- Carpogon capitatus Roxb.
- Carpogon niveus Roxb.
- Carpopogon capitatus Roxb.
- Carpopogon niveum Roxb.
- Carpopogon pruriens (L.) Roxb.
- Dolichos pruriens L.
- Macranthus cochinchinensis Lour.
- Marcanthus cochinchinense Lour.
- Mucuna aterrima (Piper & Tracy) Holland
- Mucuna atrocarpa F.P.Metcalf
- Mucuna axillaris Baker
- Mucuna bernieriana Baill.
- Mucuna capitata Wight & Arn.
- Mucuna cochinchinense (Lour.) A.Chev.
- Mucuna cochinchinensis (Lour.) A.Chev.
- Mucuna deeringiana (Bort) Merr.
- Mucuna esquirolii H. Lév.
- Mucuna esquirolii H.Lev.
- Mucuna hassjoo (Piper & Tracy) Mansf.
- Mucuna hirsuta Wight & Arn.
- Mucuna luzoniensis Merr.
- Mucuna lyonii Merr.
- Mucuna martinii H.Lev. & Vaniot
- Mucuna minima Haines
- Mucuna nivea (Roxb.) DC.
- Mucuna nivea (Roxb.) Wight & Arn.
- Mucuna prurita (L.) Hook.
- Mucuna prurita Wight
- Mucuna sericophylla Perkins
- Mucuna utilis Wight
- Mucuna velutina Hassk.
- Negretia mitis Blanco
- Stizolobium aterrimum Piper & Tracy
- Stizolobium capitatum (Roxb.) Kuntze
- Stizolobium cochinchinense (Lour.) Burk
- Stizolobium deeringianum Bort
- Stizolobium hassjoo Piper & Tracy
- Stizolobium hirsutum (Wight & Arn.) Kuntze
- Stizolobium niveum (Roxb.) Kuntze
- Stizolobium pruriens (L.) Medik.
- Stizolobium pruritum (Wight) Piper
- Stizolobium utile (Wall. ex Wight) Ditmer
- Stizolobium velutinum (Hassk.) Piper & Tracy

= Mucuna pruriens =

Species of flowering plant

Mucuna pruriens is a tropical legume native to Africa and tropical Asia and widely naturalized and cultivated. Its English common names include monkey tamarind, velvet bean, Bengal velvet bean, Florida velvet bean, Mauritius velvet bean, Yokohama velvet bean, cowage, cowitch, lacuna bean, and Lyon bean.

The plant is notorious for the extreme itchiness it produces on contact, particularly with the young foliage and the seed pods. It also produces many medium-sized red swollen bumps on the skin with the itching. It has agricultural and horticultural value, and is used in herbalism.

== Description ==
Mucuna pruriens is an annual climbing shrub with long vines that can reach over 15 metres (50 feet) in length. When the plant is young, it is almost completely covered with fuzzy hairs, but when older, it is almost completely free of hairs. The leaves are tripinnate, ovate, reverse ovate, rhombus-shaped or widely ovate. The sides of the leaves are often heavily grooved and the tips are pointy. In young specimens, both sides of the leaves have hairs. The stems of the leaflets are 2–3 millimetres (1/16–1/8 inch) long. Additional adjacent leaves are present and are about 5 mm (1/4 in) long.

The flower heads take the form of axially arrayed panicles. They are 15–32 centimetres (6–13 in) long and have two or three, or many flowers, which can be white, lavender, or purple. The accompanying leaves are about 12.5 mm (1/2 in) long; the flower stand axes are from 2.5–5 mm (1/8–3/16 in). The bell is 7.5–9 mm (5/16–3/8 in) long and silky. The sepals are longer or of the same length as the shuttles. The crown is purplish or white. The flag is 1.5 mm (1/16 in) long. The wings are 2.5–3.8 cm (1–1 1/2 in) long.

In the fruit-ripening stage, a 4–13 cm (2–5 in) long, 1–2 cm (3/8–3/4 in) wide, unwinged, leguminous fruit develops. There is a ridge along its length and the husk is covered in loose, orange hairs that cause a severe itch if they contact skin. The pods carry up to seven seeds, which are shiny black or brown drift seeds. They are flattened uniform ellipsoids, 1–1.9 cm (3/8–3/4 in) long, .8–1.3 cm (3/8–1/2 in) wide and 4–6.5 cm (2–3 in) thick. The hilum, the base of the funiculus (connection between placenta and plant seeds) is a surrounded by a significant arillus (fleshy seed shell). The dry weight of the seeds is 55–85 grams (2–3 ounces)/100 seeds.

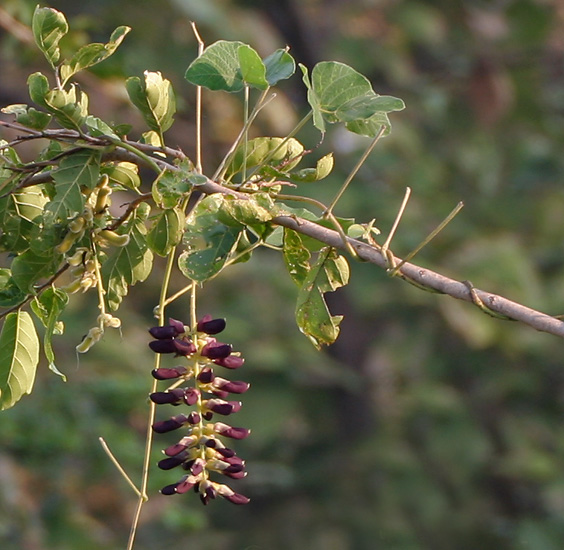
Velvet bean

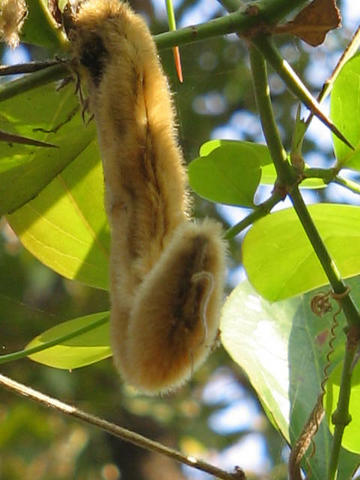
Seed pod, the hairs of which cause a dire itch

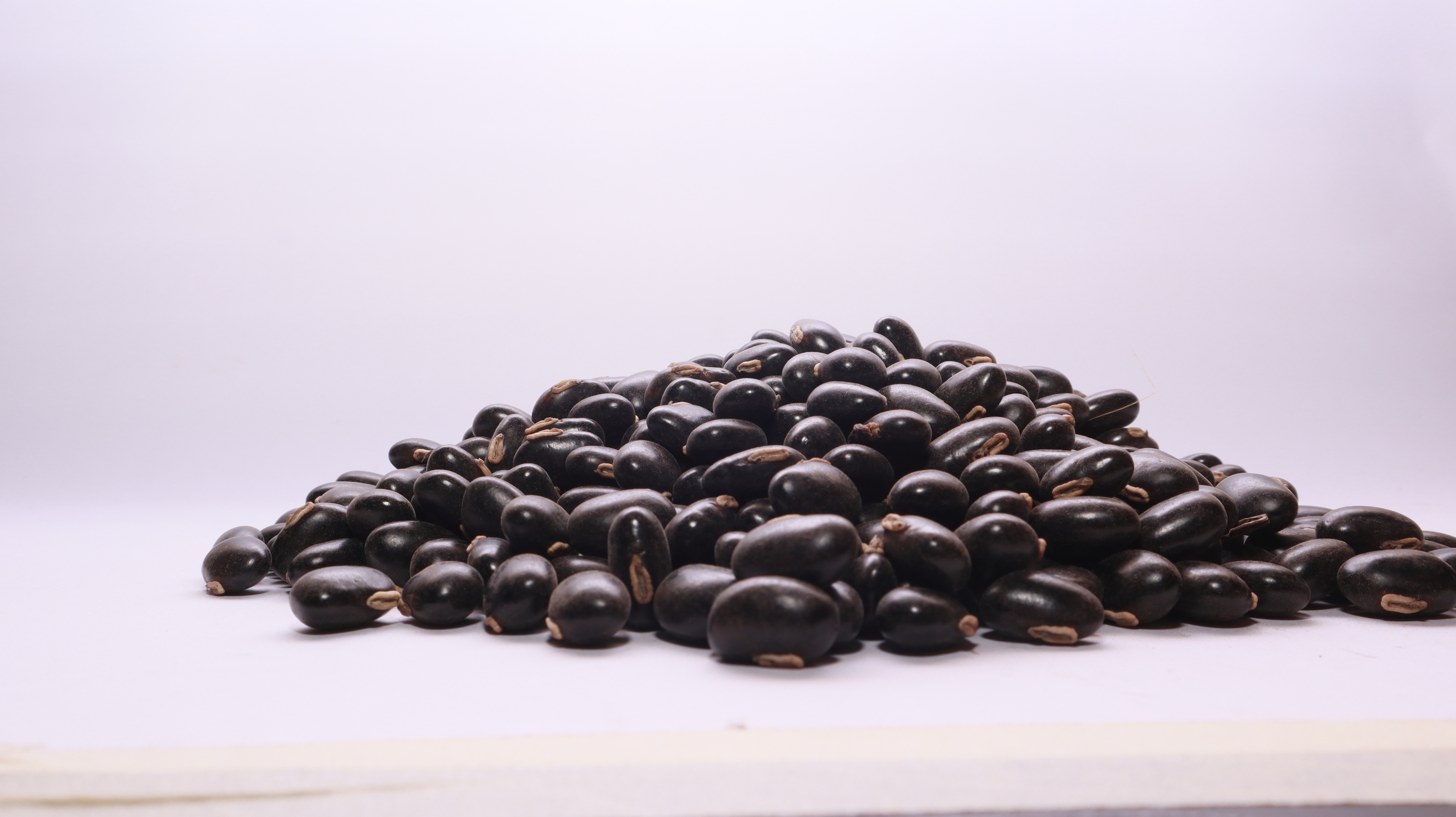
Seeds

== Constituents ==
Mucuna pruriens seeds contain dimethyltryptamine (DMT), DMT-N-oxide, 5-MeO-DMT, bufotenin, serotonin, unidentified β-carbolines, L-DOPA (levodopa), mucunine, mucunadine, prurienene, prurieninine, mucuadine, mucuadinine, mucuadininine, prurienidine, and nicotine, among other constituents. Aproteine and mucunaine are found in the hairs on seedpods and cause skin irritation. Tryptamines like DMT are present in not only the seeds but also the pods, leaves, and roots of the plant. The seeds of Mucuna pruriens contain about 3.1 to 6.1% L-DOPA. M. pruriens var. pruriens has the highest content of L-DOPA. An average of 52% degradation of L-DOPA into damaging quinones and reactive oxygen species was found in seeds of M. pruriens varieties. The amounts of individual tryptamines in the plant are very low compared to L-DOPA, for instance 0.0001 to 0.001%.

== Taxonomy ==
=== Subspecies ===
- Mucuna pruriens ssp. deeringiana (Bort) Hanelt
- Mucuna pruriens ssp. pruriens

=== Varieties ===
- Mucuna pruriens var. hirsuta (Wight & Arn.) Wilmot-Dear
- Mucuna pruriens var. pruriens (L.) DC.
- Mucuna pruriens var. sericophylla
- Mucuna pruriens var. utilis (Wall. ex Wight) L.H.Bailey is the non-stinging variety grown in Honduras.

== Itch-inducing properties ==
The hairs lining the seed pods contain serotonin and the protein mucunain, which cause severe itching when the pods are touched. The calyx below the flowers is also a source of itchy spicules and the stinging hairs on the outside of the seed pods are used in some brands of itching powder. Scratching the exposed area can spread the itching to other areas touched, which can cause blindness if in the area of the eyes. Once this happens, the subject tends to scratch vigorously and uncontrollably and for this reason the local populace in northern Mozambique refer to the beans as "mad beans" (feijões malucos). The seed pods are known as "Devil Beans" in Nigeria.

== Uses ==
In many parts of the world, M. pruriens is used as an important forage, fallow and green manure crop. Since the plant is a legume, it fixes nitrogen and fertilizes soil. In Indonesia, particularly Java, the beans are eaten and widely known as 'Benguk'. The beans can also be fermented to form a food similar to tempeh and known as Benguk tempe or 'tempe Benguk'.

M. pruriens is a widespread fodder plant in the tropics. To that end, the whole plant is fed to animals as silage, dried hay or dried seeds. M. pruriens silage contains 11–23% crude protein, 35–40% crude fiber, and the dried beans 20–35% crude protein. It also has use in the countries of Benin and Vietnam as a biological control for problematic Imperata cylindrica grass. M. pruriens is said to not be invasive outside its cultivated area. However, the plant is invasive within conservation areas of South Florida, where it frequently invades disturbed land and rockland hammock edge habitats. Cooked fresh shoots or beans can also be eaten. The plant contains relatively high (3–7% dry weight) levels of l-DOPA, which some people are sensitive to; it can cause nausea, vomiting, cramping, arrhythmias, and hypotension.

=== Traditional medicine ===
The plant and its extracts have long been used in tribal communities as an antidote for snakebite. More recently, its effects against bites by Naja (cobra), Echis (saw-scaled viper), Calloselasma (Malayan pit viper), and Bungarus (krait) species have been studied.

=== Psychoactive use ===
Extracts of Mucuna pruriens seeds produce hallucinogen-like effects in rodents, which is attributed to their psychedelic tryptamine content. Smoking the leaves of Mucuna pruriens has likewise been reported to produce psychedelic effects in humans.

== Interactions ==
Tryptamines present in Mucuna pruriens such as dimethyltryptamine (DMT), 5-MeO-DMT, bufotenin, and serotonin are normally orally inactive due to rapid metabolism by the enzyme monoamine oxidase. However, these constituents can become orally active when combined with monoamine oxidase inhibitors (MAOIs). Consequently, although levels of tryptamines in the plant are low, it has been recommended that people taking MAOIs do not consume Mucuna pruriens due to potential for adverse effects.

== Gallery ==
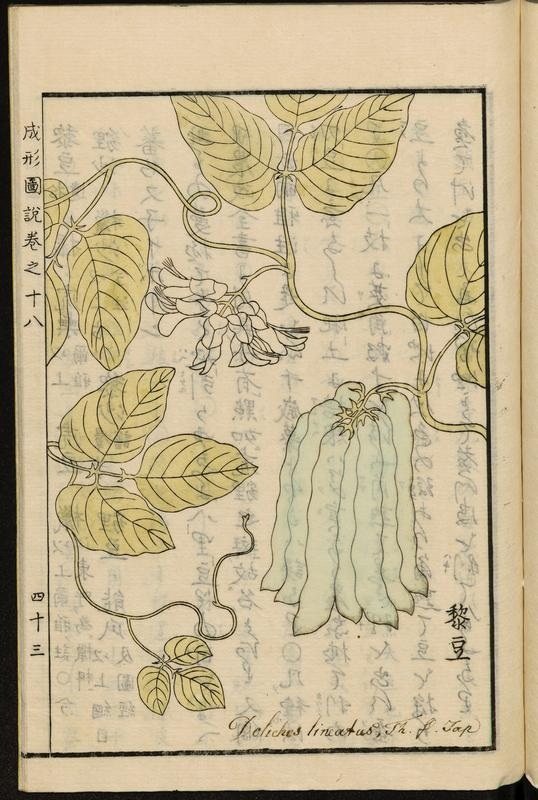
19th-century Japanese illustration

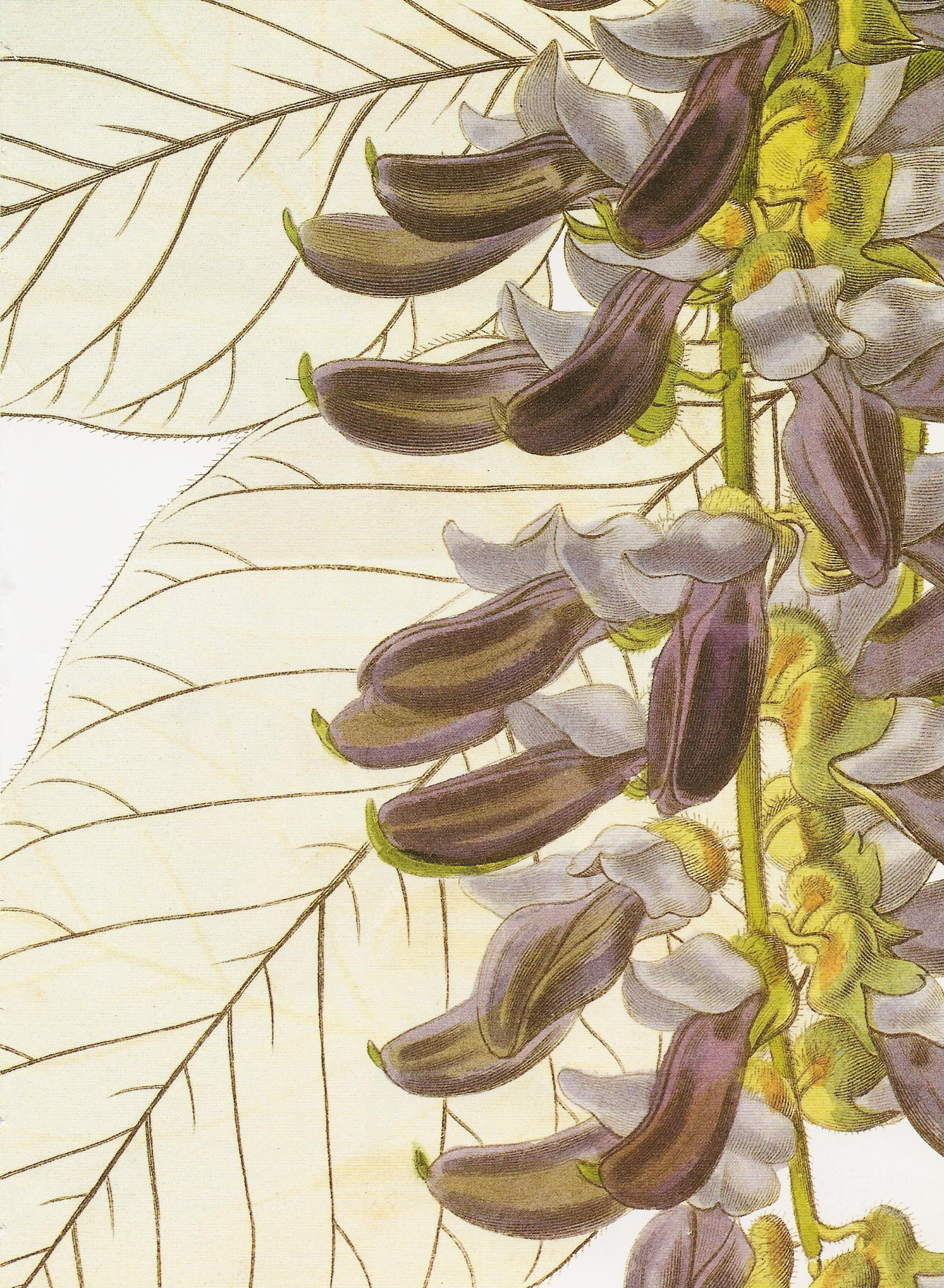
Flowers (colored engraving)

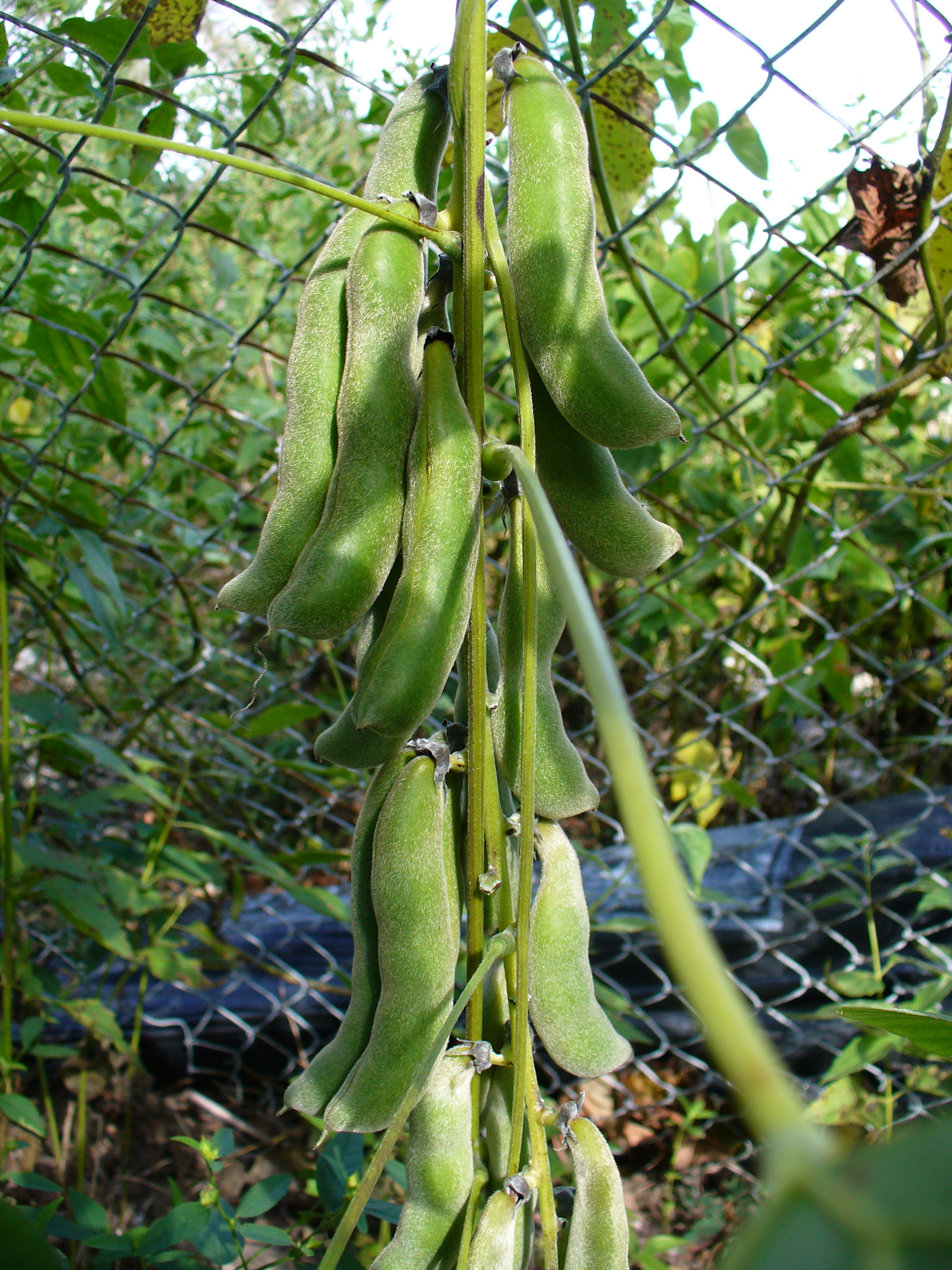
Mature seed pods

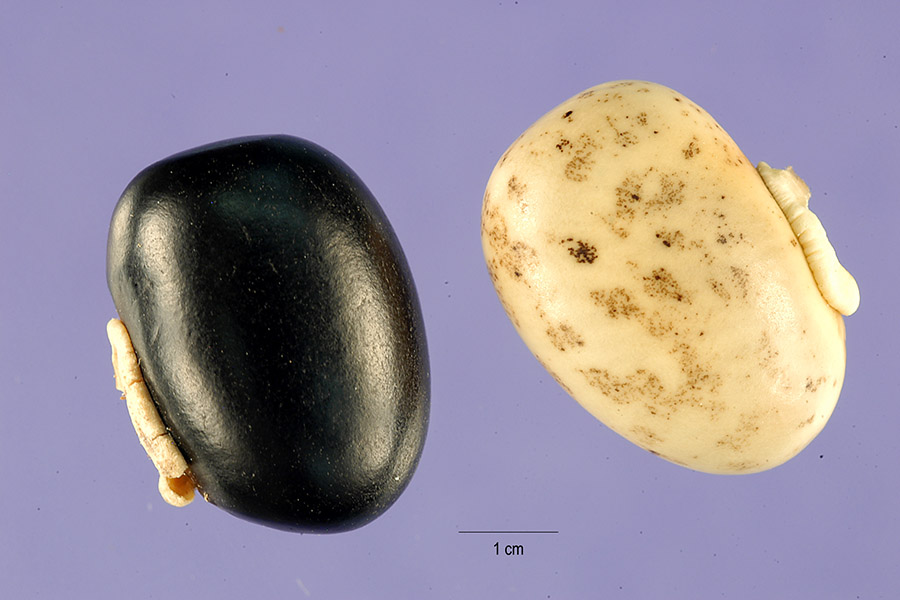
Seeds of different colors
