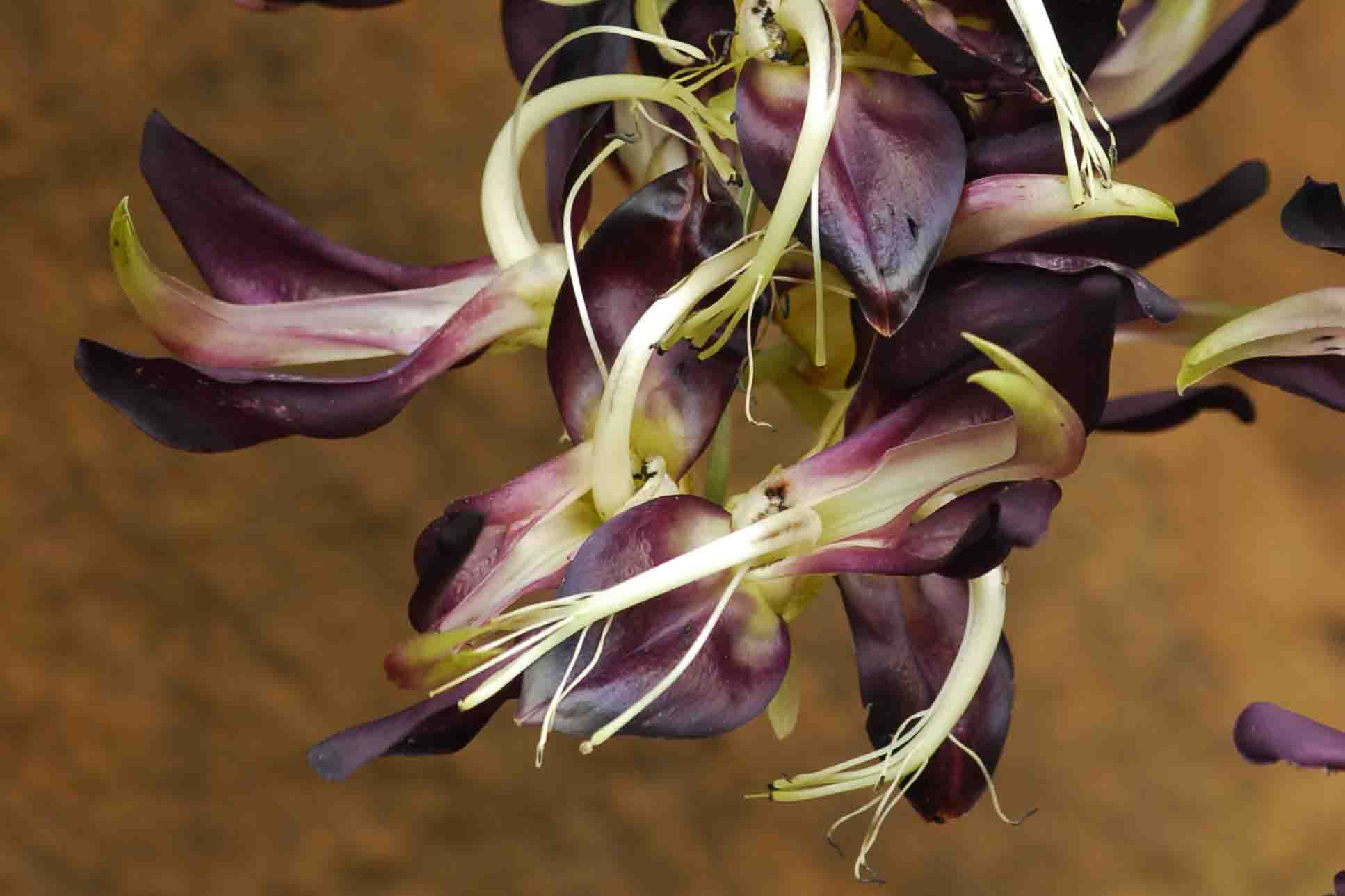
- inflorescence

Scientific classification
- Kingdom: Plantae
- Clade: Tracheophytes
- Clade: Angiosperms
- Clade: Eudicots
- Clade: Rosids
- Order: Fabales
- Family: Fabaceae
- Subfamily: Faboideae
- Genus: Mucuna
- Species: M. sanjappae

Binomial name
- Mucuna sanjappae Aitawade & S.R.Yadav

= Mucuna sanjappae =

Species of legume

Mucuna sanjappae is a perennial woody twiner from the family Fabaceae. It is endemic to India (Maharashtra), having been recorded from Junnar in Maharashtra.
