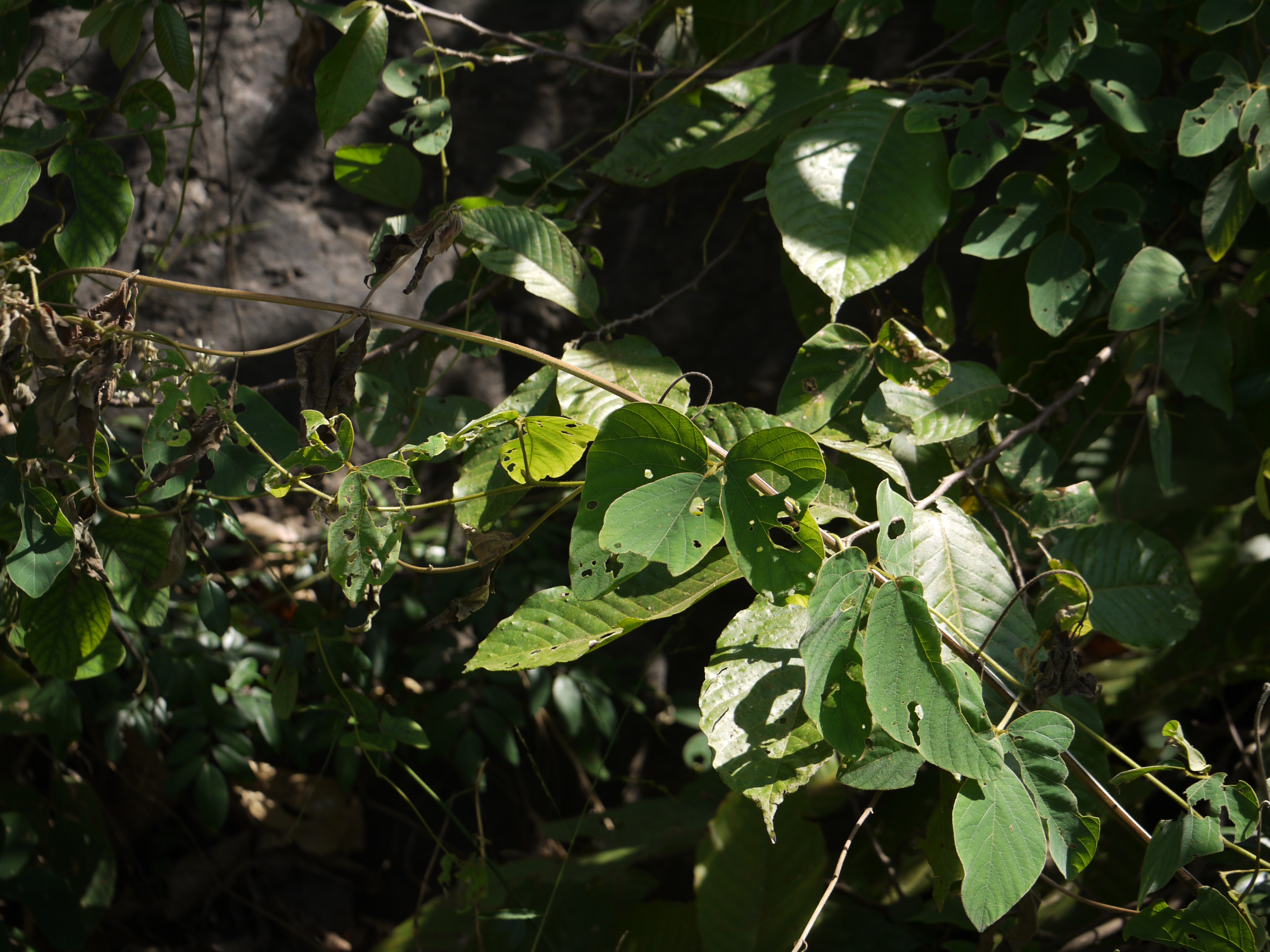

Scientific classification
- Kingdom: Plantae
- Clade: Tracheophytes
- Clade: Angiosperms
- Clade: Eudicots
- Clade: Rosids
- Order: Fabales
- Family: Fabaceae
- Subfamily: Faboideae
- Genus: Mucuna
- Species: M. monosperma

Binomial name
- Mucuna monosperma Roxb. ex Wight

= Mucuna monosperma =

Species of legume

Mucuna monosperma, commonly known as negro beans in India, or deer-eye beans, donkey-eye beans, or ox-eye beans, is a large woody climber from the family Fabaceae. The plant has three layers; a brown pod covered in small hairs, curved petals usually colored purple and black round-shaped beans. Small hairs on the pod can irritate the skin.The petals of the Muncuna monnosperma flower opens at night and closes in the morning. It is found in India, including the eastern Himalayas, the northeastern states, and the Andaman and Nicobar Islands, Sri Lanka, Bangladesh, Myanmar, and Thailand. Its natural habitat is evergreen forests, and it commonly grows near swamps or along streams.

It is discovered that M. monosperma contains L-DOPA, which is a chemical compound commonly used against Parkinson's disease. The beans of the plant contains 5.48% L-DOPA, and the content increases 6.58% when beans are soaked in water. Another research showed that M. monosperma can accelerate melanin production that can be beneficial in cosmetics, agriculture and medicine.

Other than its possible medical uses, M. monosperma has already been consumed as food in areas where it is endemic to. According to Dr. Sturtevants, it is a well-loved fruit among Brahmins.
