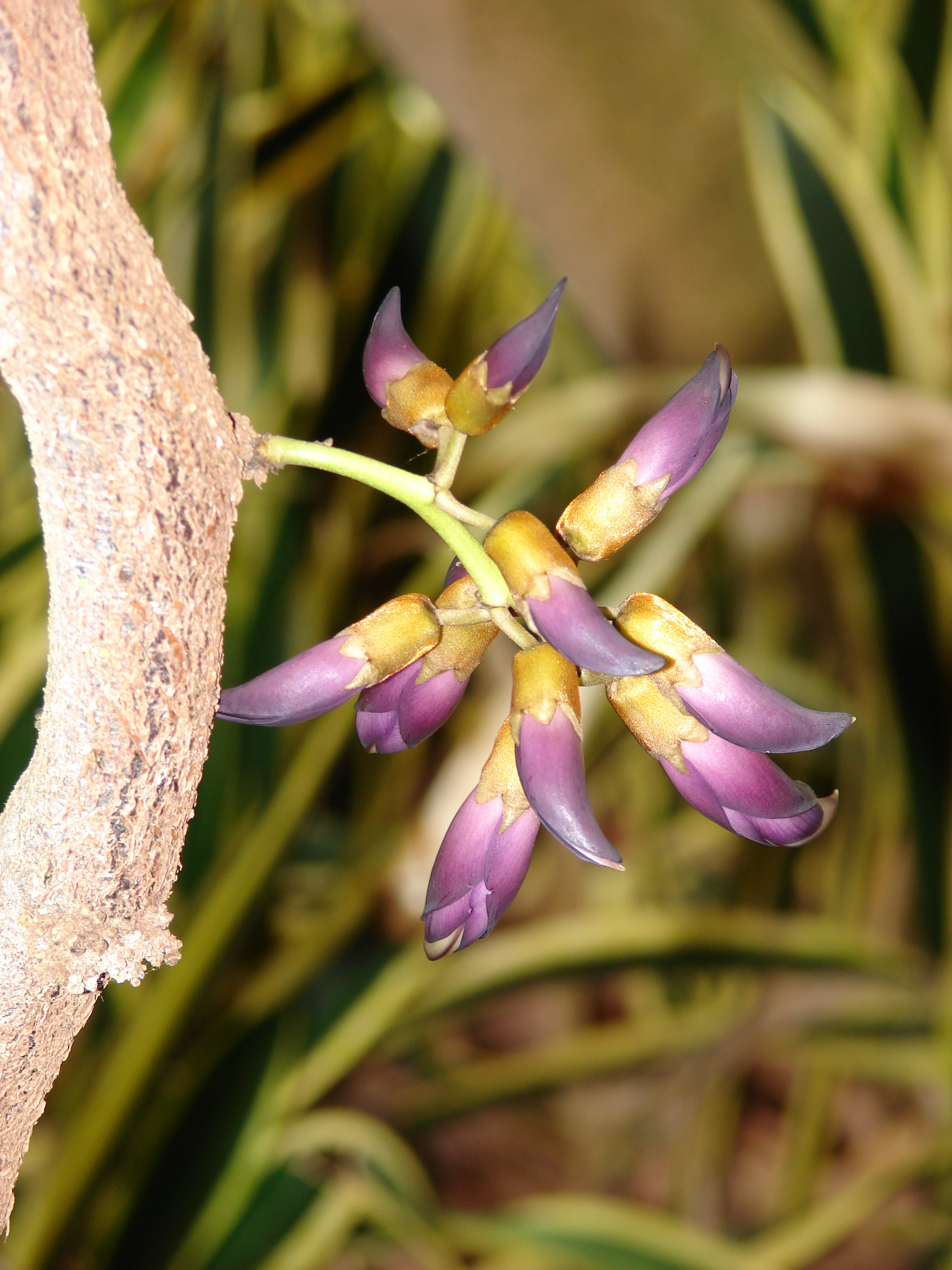
- flower (taken as M. nigricans)

Scientific classification
- Kingdom: Plantae
- Clade: Tracheophytes
- Clade: Angiosperms
- Clade: Eudicots
- Clade: Rosids
- Order: Fabales
- Family: Fabaceae
- Subfamily: Faboideae
- Clade: Millettioids
- Tribe: Phaseoleae
- Genus: Mucuna
- Species: M. interrupta

Binomial name
- Mucuna interrupta Gagnep.

Synonyms
- Citta nigricans Lour.; Mucuna nigricans (Lour.) Steud.; Mucuna nigricans var. cordata Craib.; Negretia nigricans (Lour.) Poir.; Stizolobium nigricans (Lour.) Pers.

= Mucuna interrupta =

Species of plants

Mucuna interrupta is a species of SE Asian vine plants in the family Fabaceae, first described by François Gagnepain in 1914. According to Plants of the World Online there are no subspecies (but note the species names, including Mucuna nigricans, brought to synonymy); the native range is Bhutan to China (Yunnan) and Indochina.

== Description and habitat ==
Mucuna interrupta is a climbing perennial or shrub and can be found in primary and secondary, subtropical and tropical forest margins. This species is distinctive in having "large fruit with flat marginal wings and wide lamellae uniformly interrupted along the midline, not extending into the winged margins, and with flat or upcurved apical halves".
