= Mucuna flagellipes =

Scientific classification
- Kingdom: Plantae
- Clade: Tracheophytes
- Clade: Angiosperms
- Clade: Eudicots
- Clade: Rosids
- Order: Fabales
- Family: Fabaceae
- Subfamily: Faboideae
- Genus: Mucuna
- Species: M. flagellipes

Binomial name
- Mucuna flagellipes Vogel ex Hook.f.

Synonyms
- Stizolobium flagellipes Kuntze

Species of flowering plant

Mucuna flagellipes is a species of plant of the Congo Basin belonging to the subfamily Papilionoideae of the legume family Fabaceae. It is a rainforest vine growing to about 12 m (39 ft) long and 3 cm (1.2 in) diameter with trifoliate leaves. The pendant inflorescences grow from the leaf axils and may be up to 20 cm (7.9 in) long, attached to the branch on a peduncle about 3 cm (1.2 in) long.
