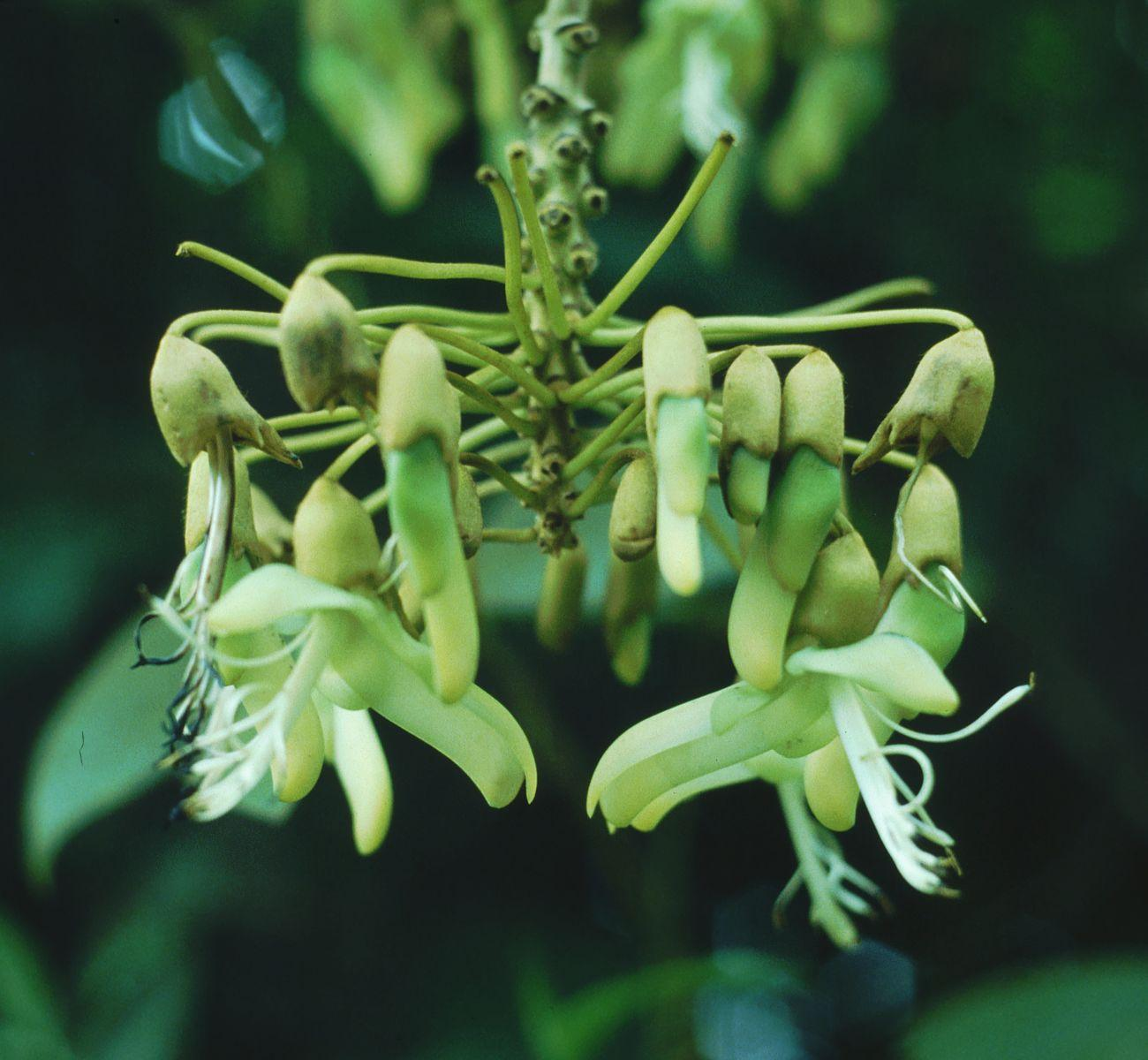
- Mucuna holtonii, inflorescence

Scientific classification
- Kingdom: Plantae
- Clade: Tracheophytes
- Clade: Angiosperms
- Clade: Eudicots
- Clade: Rosids
- Order: Fabales
- Family: Fabaceae
- Subfamily: Faboideae
- Genus: Mucuna
- Species: M. holtonii

Binomial name
- Mucuna holtonii Moldenke

Synonyms
- Stizolobium holtonii

= Mucuna holtonii =

Species of legume

Mucuna holtonii is a species of plant in the bean family, which is pollinated by bats. Bats are able to detect if the flowers have nectar using echolocation. After an initial bat visit during which nectar is removed, the petals are arranged in a different manner (altering the shape of the flower). As a result, the unique "echo fingerprint" of petal arrangement informs the bat whether nectar is present or absent.

It is thought that the plant evolved acoustically conspicuous structures to make them easier to detect by glossophagine bats.
