= Mucunain =

Plant protein

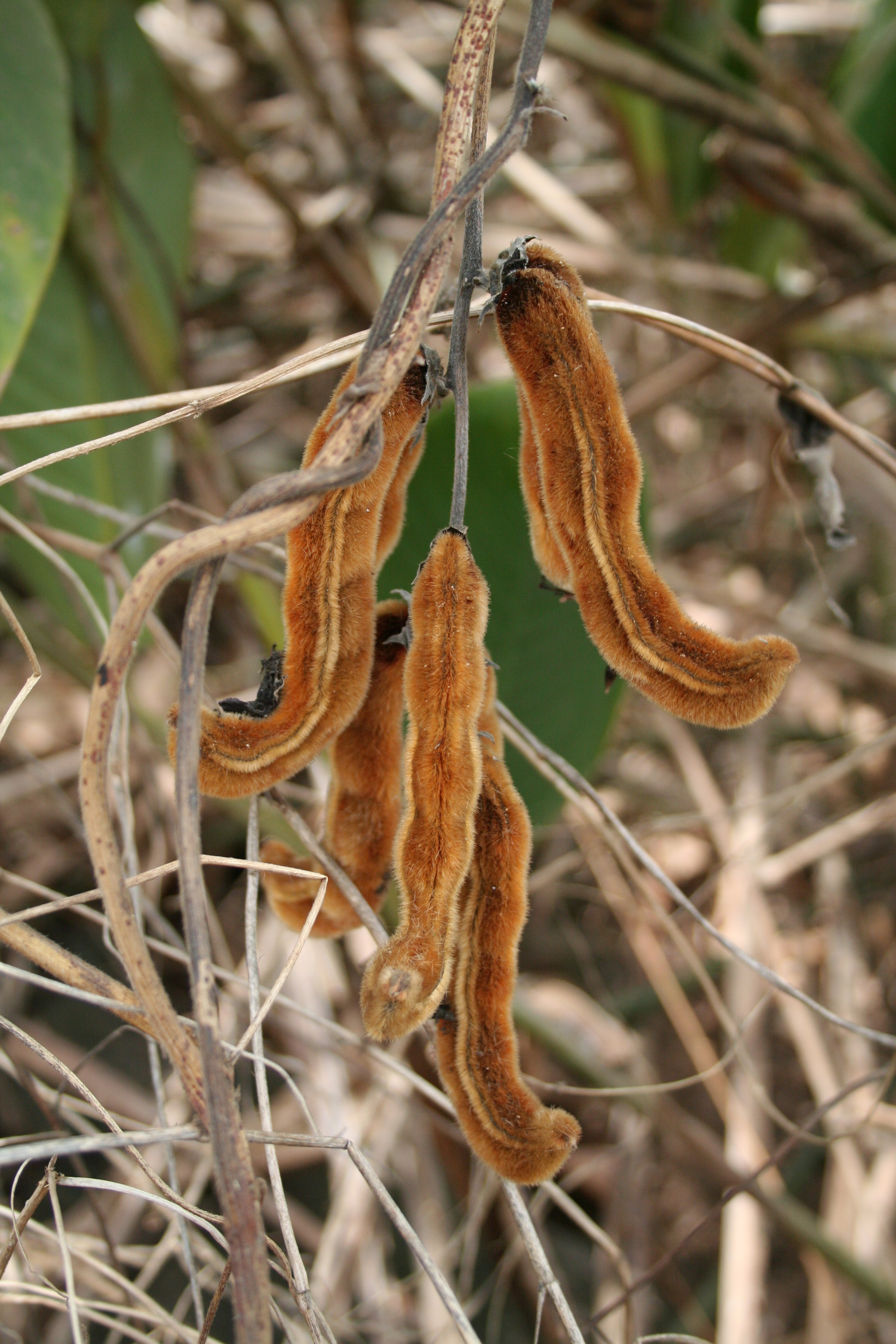
The hairy pods of Mucuna poggei

The proteolytic enzyme mucunain is a protein in the tissues of certain legumes of the genus Mucuna, especially velvet bean (Mucuna pruriens).

In these species the mucunain is found in stiff hairs, or trichomes, covering the seed pods. When the hairs rub off and come in contact with skin they cause severe itching and irritation.
