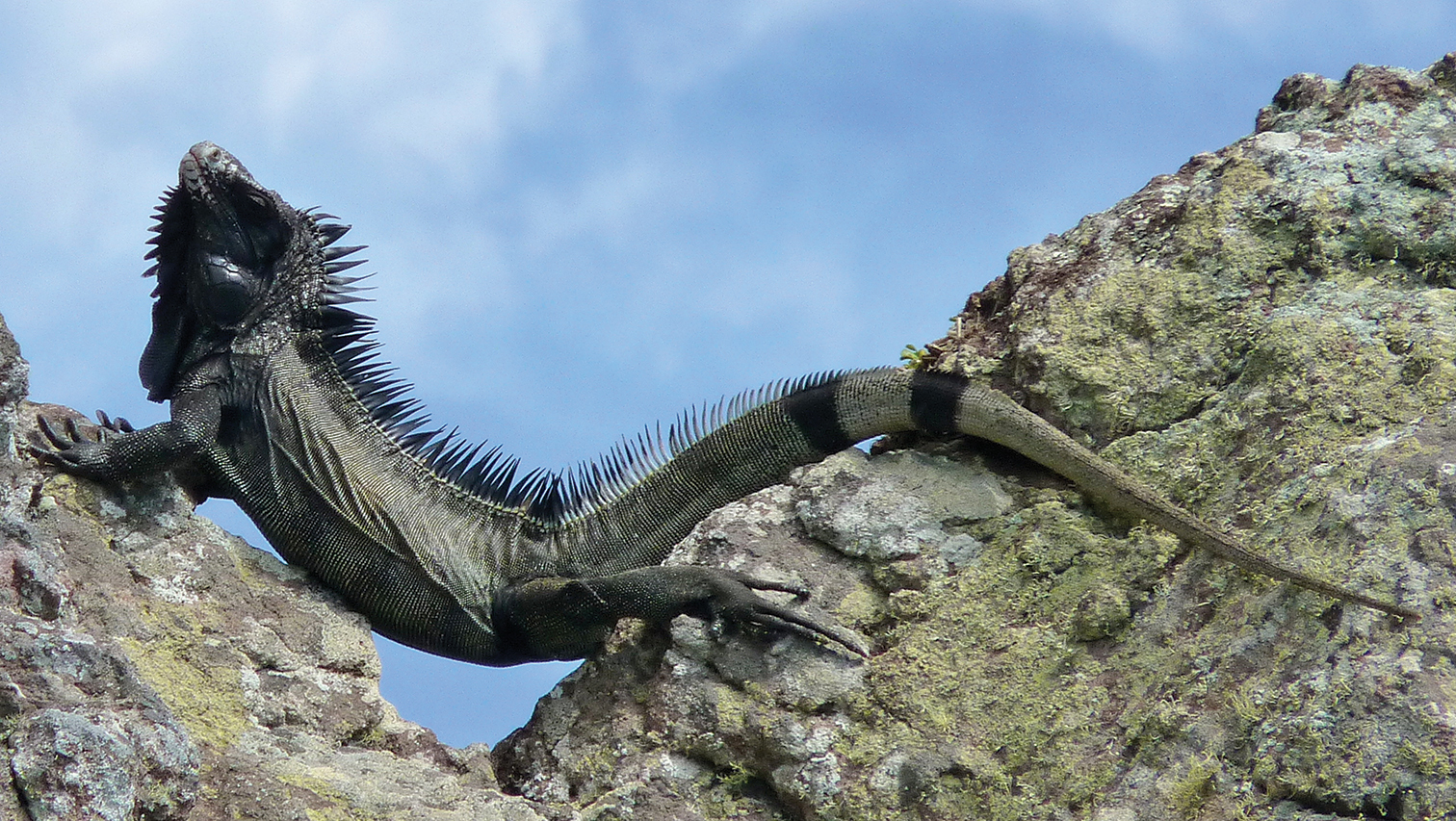
- In known habitat on Saba

Conservation status
- Critically Endangered (IUCN 3.1)
- CITES Appendix II

Scientific classification
- Kingdom: Animalia
- Phylum: Chordata
- Class: Reptilia
- Order: Squamata
- Suborder: Iguania
- Family: Iguanidae
- Genus: Iguana
- Species: I. iguana
- Subspecies: I. i. melanoderma

Trinomial name
- Iguana iguana melanoderma Breuil et al., 2020

= Saban black iguana =

Subspecies of reptile

The Saban black iguana (Iguana iguana melanoderma) is a subspecies (sometimes considered a distinct species) of the green iguana thought to be endemic to the islands of Saba and Montserrat, although external evidence indicates that it may be distributed in other parts of the Caribbean. It was described in 2020 as a distinct species, although the Reptile Database classifies it as a subspecies of the common green iguana (Iguana iguana).

== Taxonomy ==
The subspecies was previously considered to represent melanistic individuals of the green iguana. It was reclassified as a separate subspecies based on a number of genomic distinctions (private microsatellite alleles and unique mitochondrial ND4 haplotypes) and consistent morphological characteristics. Genetic evidence indicates that I. i. melanoderma is the sister group of the green iguana populations from South America (considered I. iguana iguana), with both forming a clade that is the sister group of the green iguana populations present on St. Lucia and the Grenadines, which are considered a distinct subspecies, I. i. insularis. The Reptile Database also recognizes the Saban black iguana as a distinct taxonomic entity, but due to its close relation to the green iguana, it (along with the two subspecies of I. insularis) is instead classified as a subspecies of the green iguana, as I. i. melanoderma. Full species and subspecies status have been questioned by a new study that suggests it should remain within I. iguana iguana.

== Distribution ==
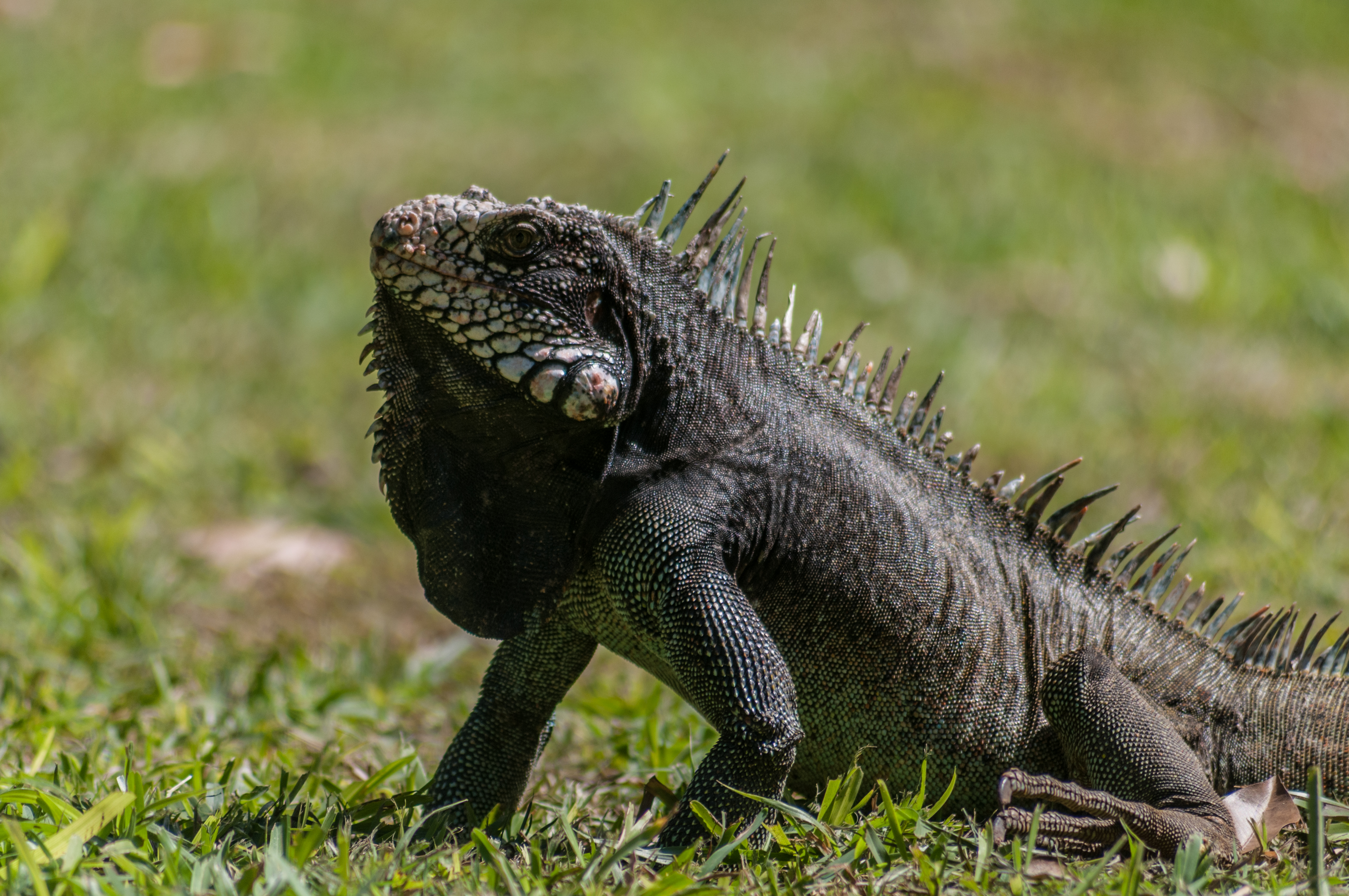
A member of the putative Venezuelan population, which may be the source population for the subspecies.

As proposed in the original publication, the subspecies displays a very unusual disjunct distribution. Member populations are found on Montserrat and Saba, as well as on the Virgin Islands and the island of Vieques, and in northern Venezuela, including several coastal islets as well as the mainland vicinity of Cumaná. The mainland distribution has not been well defined. A news article indicated that it is believed the species was also present on Redonda, but this was not addressed in the original publication; several authors have mentioned having seen iguanas, but no specimens have been collected, nor any fossils identified. Recent genetic insights confirm that near-indistinguishable melanistic iguanas (compared to Saba and Montserrat) from Puerto Rico and the Virgin Islands have identical mitochondrial haplotypes as those two populations in the Lesser Antilles. Genetic data remains to be analyzed from the populations assigned to this subspecies in Venezuela.

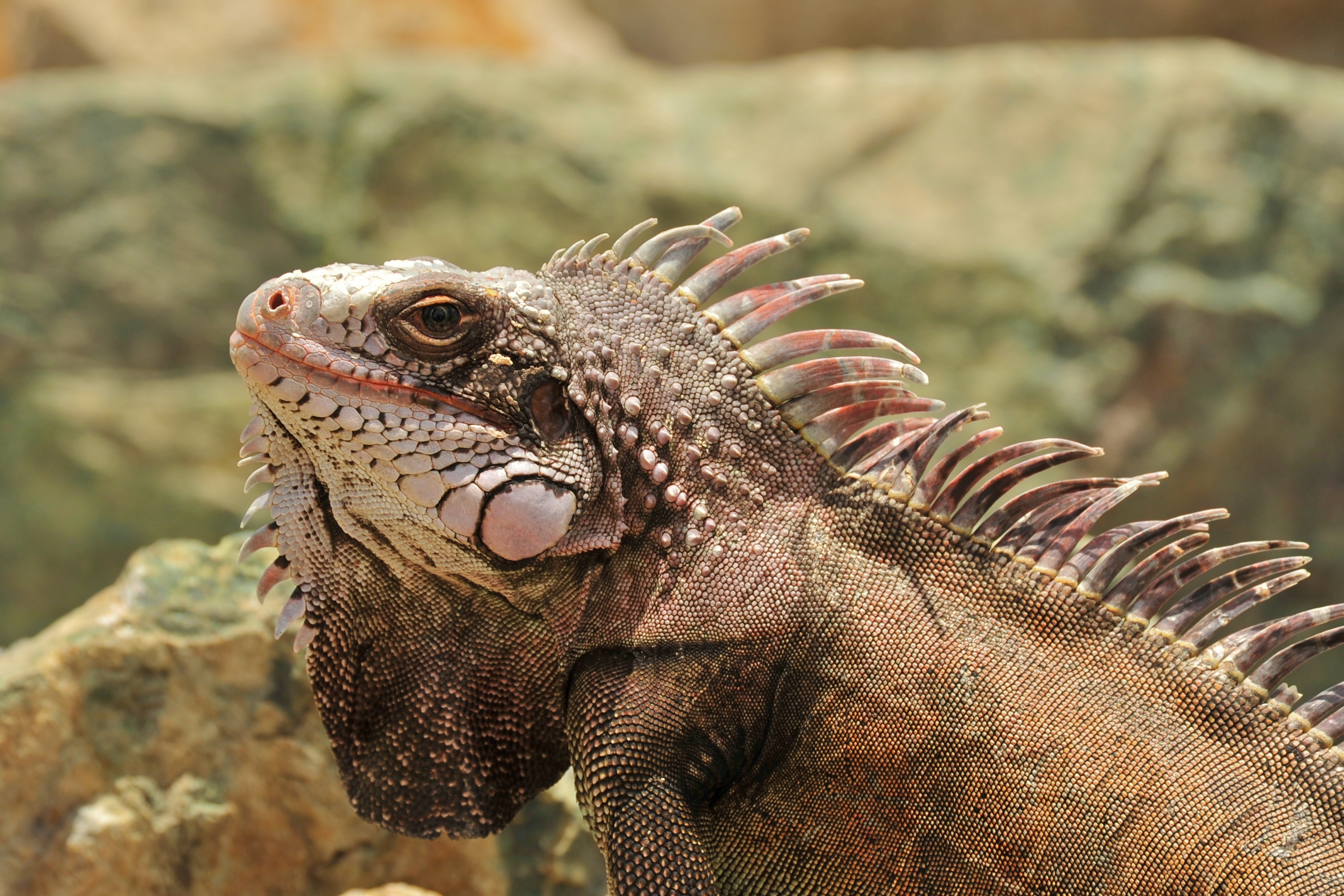
A member of the putative Virgin Islands population, on Saint Thomas

It is theorized that coastal Venezuela is the source population for I. i. melanoderma and also where it diverged from other iguanas. Three dispersal events have been proposed; one from coastal Venezuela to either Saba or Montserrat (with Montserrat being more likely if the dispersal was natural), a second pre-Columbian dispersal from one of these two islands to the other, and a third to Puerto Rico and the Virgin Islands. These dispersal events may have happened from natural dispersals, transport and introduction by Amerindians and/or European colonists, or both. As parts of its range may have been facilitated by human transport, its strange disjunct distribution may not be entirely natural in origin.

A 2022 population estimate on Saba suggests that ~6000 iguanas occur on the island.

== Description ==
The Saban black iguana is darker coloured than the other subspecies of green iguana, with colouration deepening in older individuals. It possesses a black dewlap, high dorsal spikes, no horns on the snout, and carries a noticeable black patch between the eye and tympanum. Although the Saban black iguana has been described as more darker than other subspecies, a recent population assessment of the Saba population indicated that only a small percentage of all adults become completely melanistic. While many iguanas become only partially melanistic, all had a black facial patch between the tympanum and eye.

== Conservation ==
It has been suggested that the subspecies is threatened by unsustainable harvest for consumption and the pet trade, and by competition with and hybridization from escaped or released non-native iguanas. Indeed, non-native iguanas were sighted on Saba for the first time in 2021. Action was undertaken to remove these non-native iguanas from Saba, efforts which are still ongoing in 2025. There have been plans to reintroduce the subspecies to Redonda, where it may have formerly occurred but was extirpated from.

Iguanas from Saba have been illegally exported and subsequently traded using fraudulent CITES permits, and are currently offered as pets in numerous countries across the globe.
