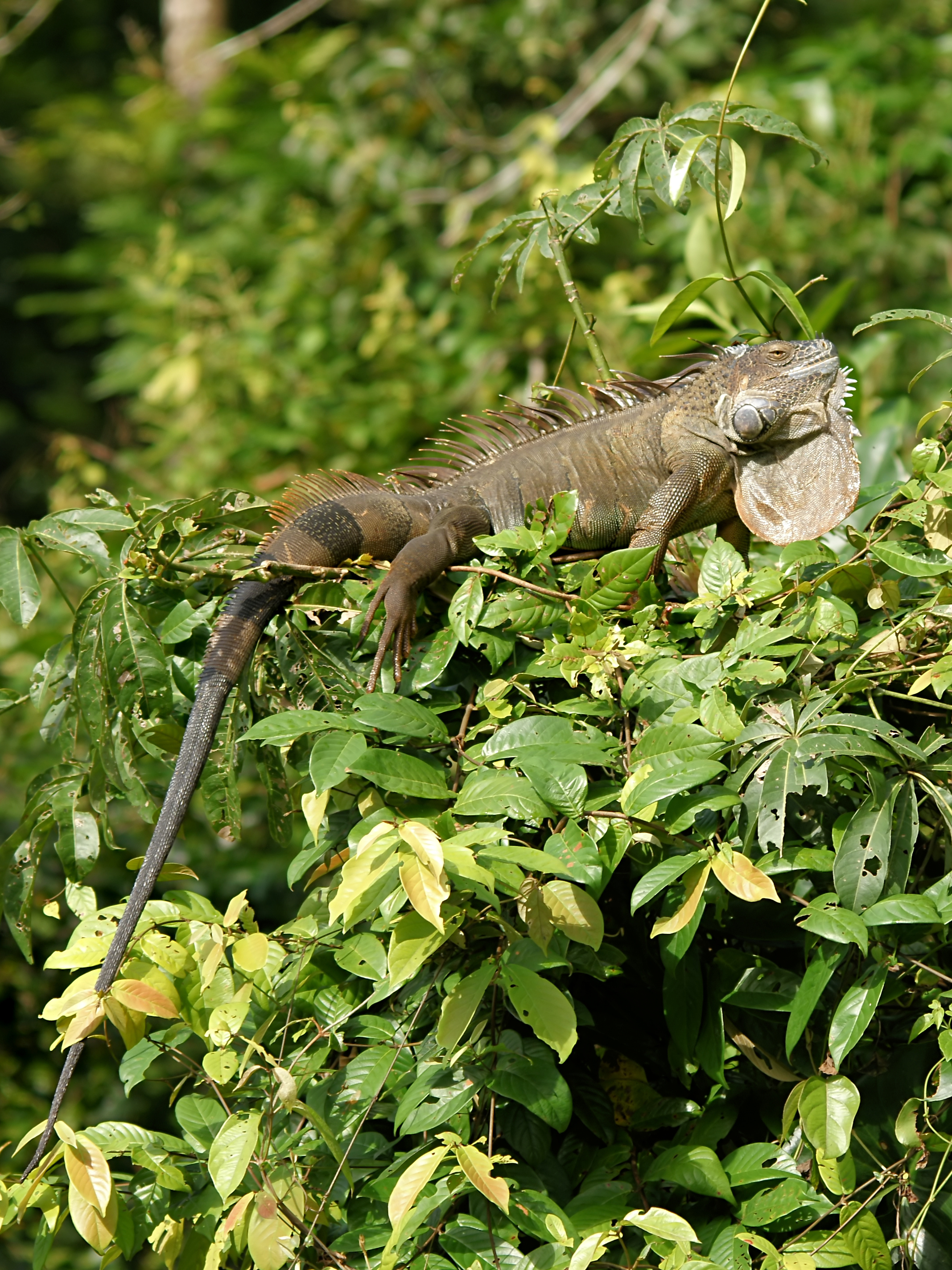
- An adult green iguana in Costa Rica

Conservation status
- Least Concern (IUCN 3.1)
- CITES Appendix II

Scientific classification
- Kingdom: Animalia
- Phylum: Chordata
- Class: Reptilia
- Order: Squamata
- Suborder: Iguania
- Family: Iguanidae
- Genus: Iguana
- Species: I. iguana

Binomial name
- Iguana iguana Linnaeus, 1758

Subspecies
- I. i. iguana; I. i. insularis; I. i. melanoderma; I. i. sanctaluciae
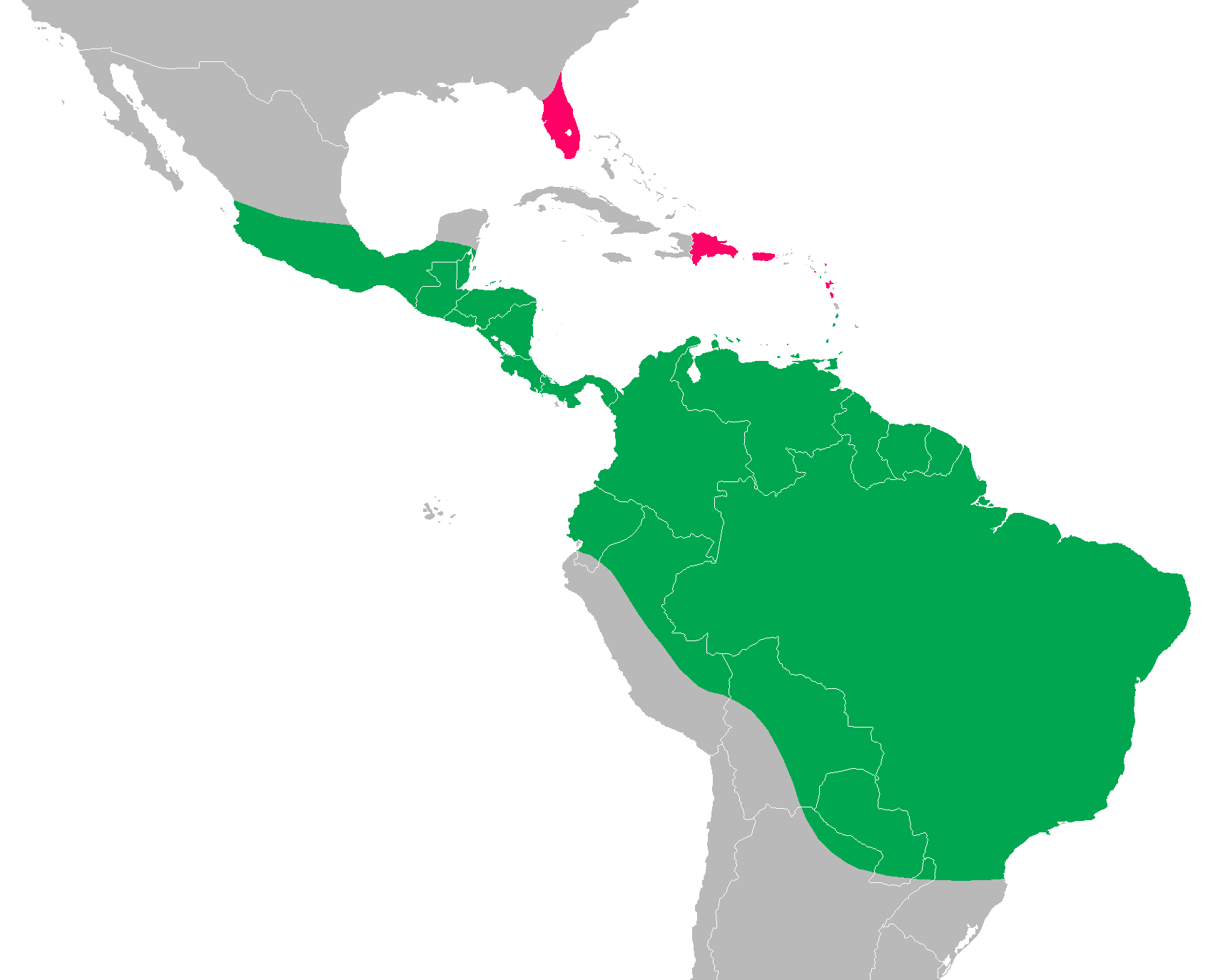
- Native range in green; introduced range in red

Synonyms
- List: Lacerta iguana Linnaeus, 1758; Hypsilophus tuberculatus Wagler 1830; Iguana hernandessi Jan 1857; Iguana iguana rhinolopha Wiegman, 1834; Hypsilophus rhinolophus Fitzinger, 1843; Iguana rhinolopha Dumeril & Bibron, 1837; Iguana rhinolophus Günther, 1885

= Green iguana =

Green iguana Temporal range: 0.115–0 Ma Upper Pleistocene - Present

Species of reptile

The green iguana (Iguana iguana), also known as the American iguana or the common green iguana, is a large, arboreal, mostly herbivorous species of lizard of the genus Iguana. Usually, this animal is simply called the iguana. The green iguana ranges over a large geographic area; it is native from southern Brazil and Paraguay as far north as Mexico. It is highly invasive in many subtropical and tropical environments throughout the world.

A herbivore, it has adapted significantly with regard to locomotion and osmoregulation as a result of its diet. It grows to 1.7 m (5.6 ft) in length from head to tail, although a few specimens have grown more than 2 m (6.6 ft) with bodyweights upward of 9 kg (20 lb).

Although this species is commonly kept as a pet because of its disposition and coloration, it can be challenging to care for properly. Its requirements for adequate space, lighting, and heat can be difficult for hobbyists to meet.

== Taxonomy ==
The species was first officially described by Swedish botanist Carl Linnaeus in 1758. Since then, numerous subspecies have been identified, but later classified as merely regional variants of the same species.

Using nuclear and mitochondrial DNA-sequence data to explore the phylogenic history of the green iguana, scientists from El Salvador, Mexico, and the United States studied animals collected from 17 countries. The topology of phylogeny indicated that the species originated in South America and eventually radiated through Central America and the Caribbean. The study revealed no unique mitochondrial DNA haplotypes for subspecific status, but did indicate the deep lineage divergence between Central and South American populations.

Naturalists once classified the Central American iguanas as a separate subspecies (I. i. rhinolopha), but this classification was later found to be invalid based on mitochondrial DNA, and iguanas with similar nose projections appeared randomly in other populations and interbred freely with those that do not share this trait. Genetic studies in the late 2010s still recovered I. rhinolopha as a distinct species, along with several other cryptic lineages present in I. iguana, and classifying only the South American populations may be the "true" green iguana. Two new insular subspecies (I. i. insularis and I. i. sanctaluciae) endemic to St. Lucia, Saint Vincent and the Grenadines and Grenada were also identified in 2019; a 2020 study also recovered both these subspecies as part of a distinct species, the southern Antillean horned iguana (I. insularis). That 2020 study described the Saban black iguana (I. melanoderma), which they identified to be the sister group of South American I. iguana, with the clade containing both being sister to that of I. insularis. The Reptile Database disagrees with these conclusions, and groups all of these within the green iguana, with four subspecies: I. i. melanoderma, I. i. insularis, I. i.sanctaluciae, and I. i. iguana. Indicating that consensus about the status of these elevated populations has not been reached. A species or subspecies status of I. melanoderma has been questioned, and instead proposed that for now it should be considered as part of I. i. iguana.

=== Etymology ===
The word "iguana" is derived from a Spanish form of the Taíno name for the species: iwana. In some Spanish-speaking countries, males of the species are referred to as garrobo or ministro and juveniles are called iguanita or garrobito.

== Distribution ==
The native range of the green iguana extends from southern Mexico to central Brazil, Paraguay, and Bolivia and the Caribbean; specifically Grenada, Aruba, Curaçao, Bonaire, Trinidad and Tobago, St. Lucia, St. Vincent, Montserrat, Saba and Útila. People in the native regions utilize this species for food leading to increased captive breeding efforts.

=== Introduced range ===
They have been introduced to Grand Cayman, Puerto Rico, Hispaniola (in the Dominican Republic side), Saint Martin (island), Guadeloupe, Martinique, Saint Vincent and the Grenadines, Singapore, Thailand, Taiwan, Texas, Florida, Hawaii, and the U.S. Virgin Islands.

Green iguanas colonised the island of Anguilla in 1995 after being washed ashore following a hurricane, serving as direct proof of the mechanism of oceanic dispersal in allowing species to colonise areas where they previously did not occur. Though the species is not native to Martinique, a small wild colony of released or escaped green iguanas endures at historic Fort Saint Louis.

The green iguana has been introduced from South America to Puerto Rico and is very common throughout the island, where it is considered an invasive species; in the United States, feral populations also exist in South Florida (including the Florida Keys), Hawaii, the U.S. Virgin Islands and the Rio Grande Valley of Texas.

== Description ==
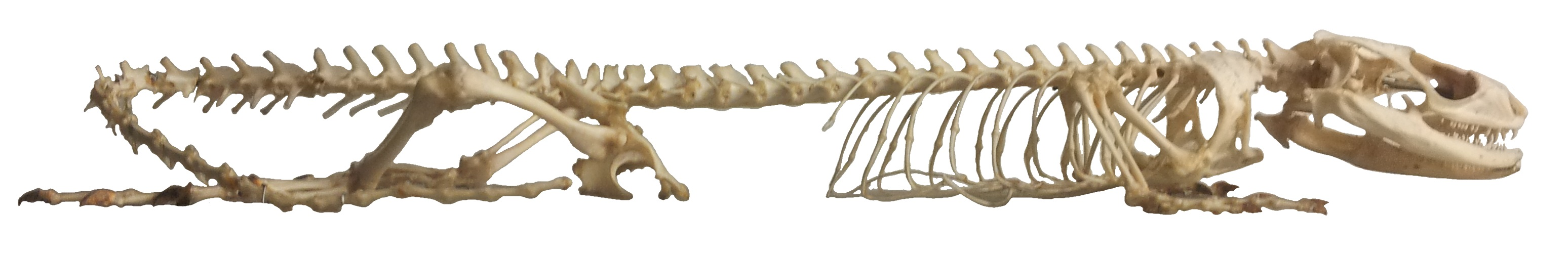
Green iguana skeleton

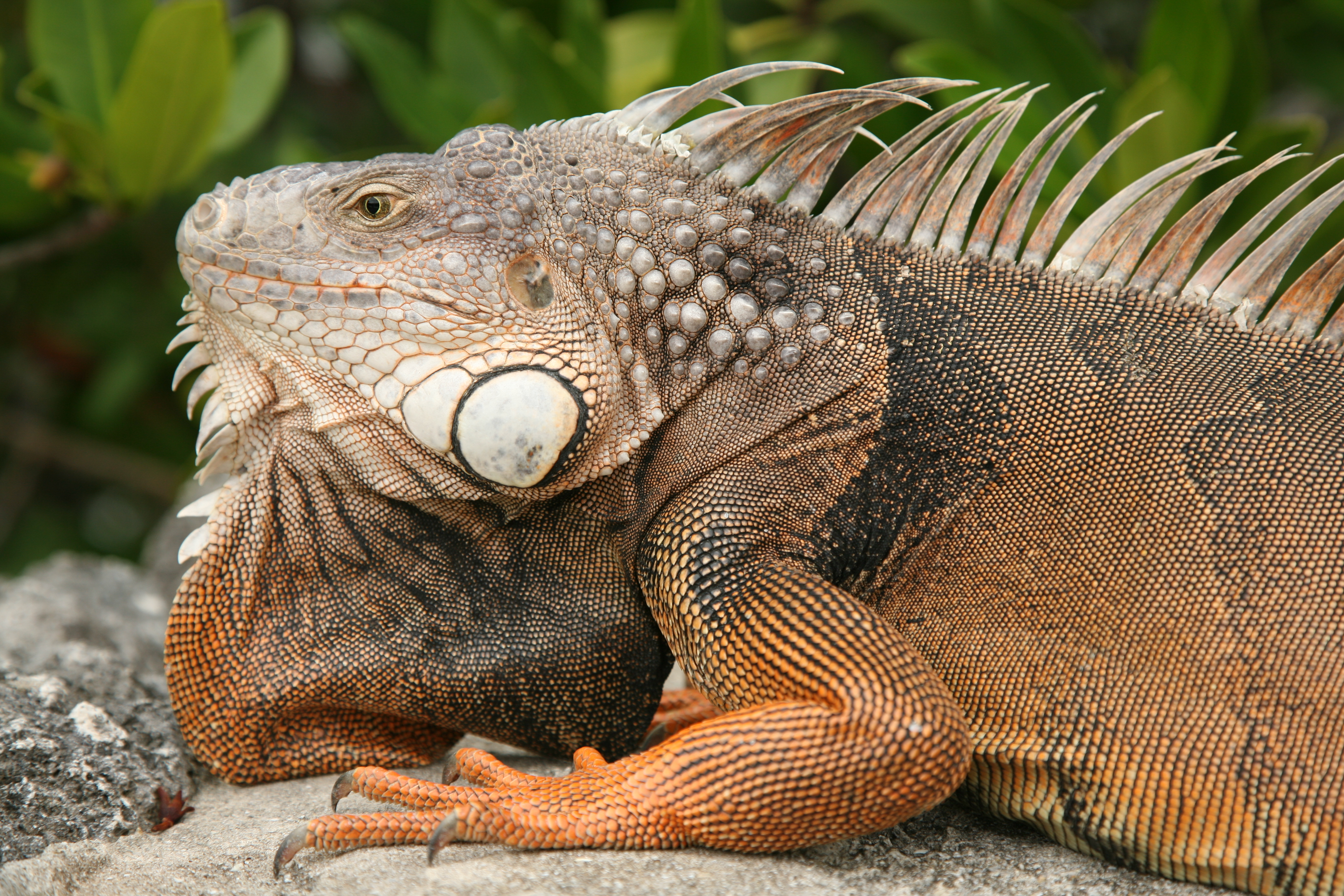
Showing prominent spines and dewlap, in Florida

The green iguana is a large lizard and is probably the largest species in the iguana family, though a few in the genus Cyclura may match or exceed it in weight. Adults typically grow to 1.2 to 1.7 m (3.9 to 5.6 ft) in length from head to tail. As in all iguanas, the tail comprises much of this length, and the snout-to-vent length of most green iguanas is 30 to 42 cm (12 to 17 in). A typical adult male weighs around 4 kg (8.8 lb) while the smaller adult female typically weighs 1.2 to 3 kg (2.6 to 6.6 lb). A few large males can reach or exceed 8 kg (18 lb) in weight and 2 m (6.6 ft) long. Some specimens have even reportedly been measured at a body weight of greater than 8 kg (18 lb).

Green iguanas possess a row of spines along their backs and tails, which helps to protect them from predators. Their whip-like tails can be used to deliver painful strikes, and like many other lizards, when grabbed by the tail, iguanas can allow it to break, so they can escape and eventually regenerate a new one. In addition, iguanas have a well-developed dewlap, which helps regulate their body temperature. This dewlap is used in courtships and territorial displays.

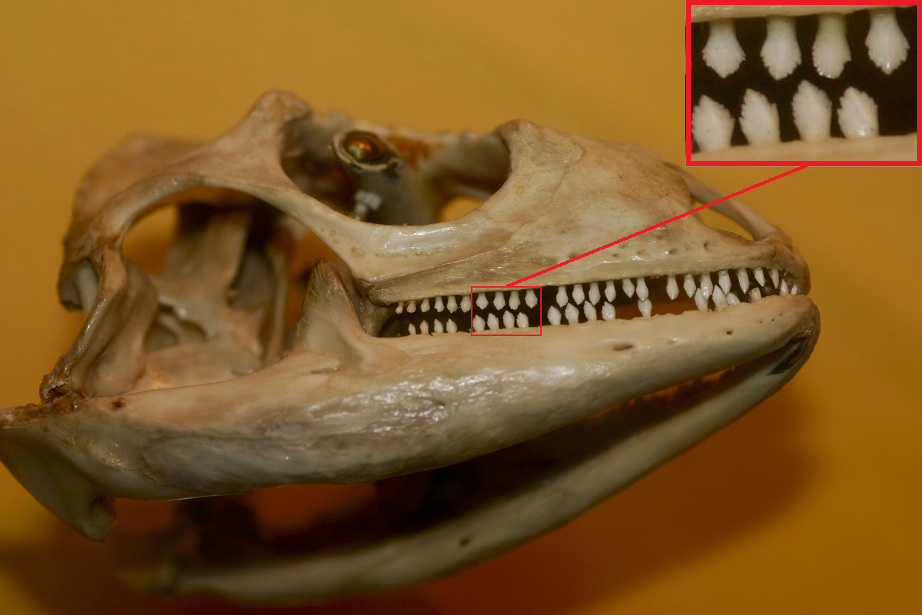
Skull and close-up of teeth

Green iguanas have very sharp teeth that are capable of shredding leaves and even human skin. These teeth are shaped like a leaf, broad and flat, with serrations on the edge. The similarity of these teeth to those of one of the first dinosaurs discovered led to the dinosaur being named Iguanodon, meaning "iguana tooth", and the incorrect assumption that it had resembled a gigantic iguana. The teeth are situated on the inner sides of the jawbones, which is why they are hard to see in smaller specimens. Primarily herbivorous, green iguanas are presented with a special problem for osmoregulation; plant matter contains more potassium and as it has less dense nutritional content, more must be eaten to meet metabolic needs. As green iguanas are not capable of creating liquid urine more concentrated than their bodily fluids, like birds they excrete nitrogenous wastes as urate salts through a salt gland. As a result, green iguanas have developed a lateral nasal gland to supplement renal salt secretion by expelling excess potassium and sodium chlorides.

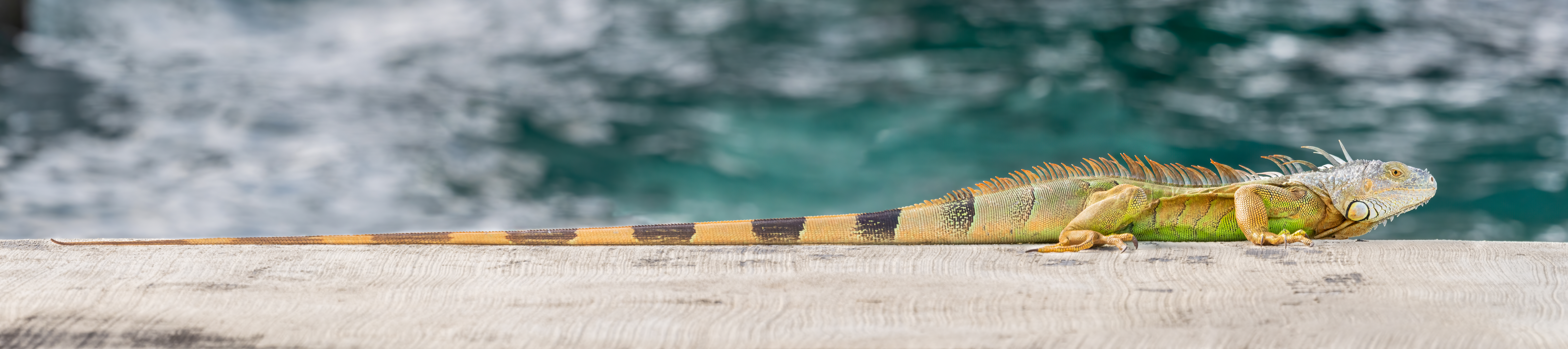
Green iguana basking in Palm Beach County, Florida

=== Geographic variation ===
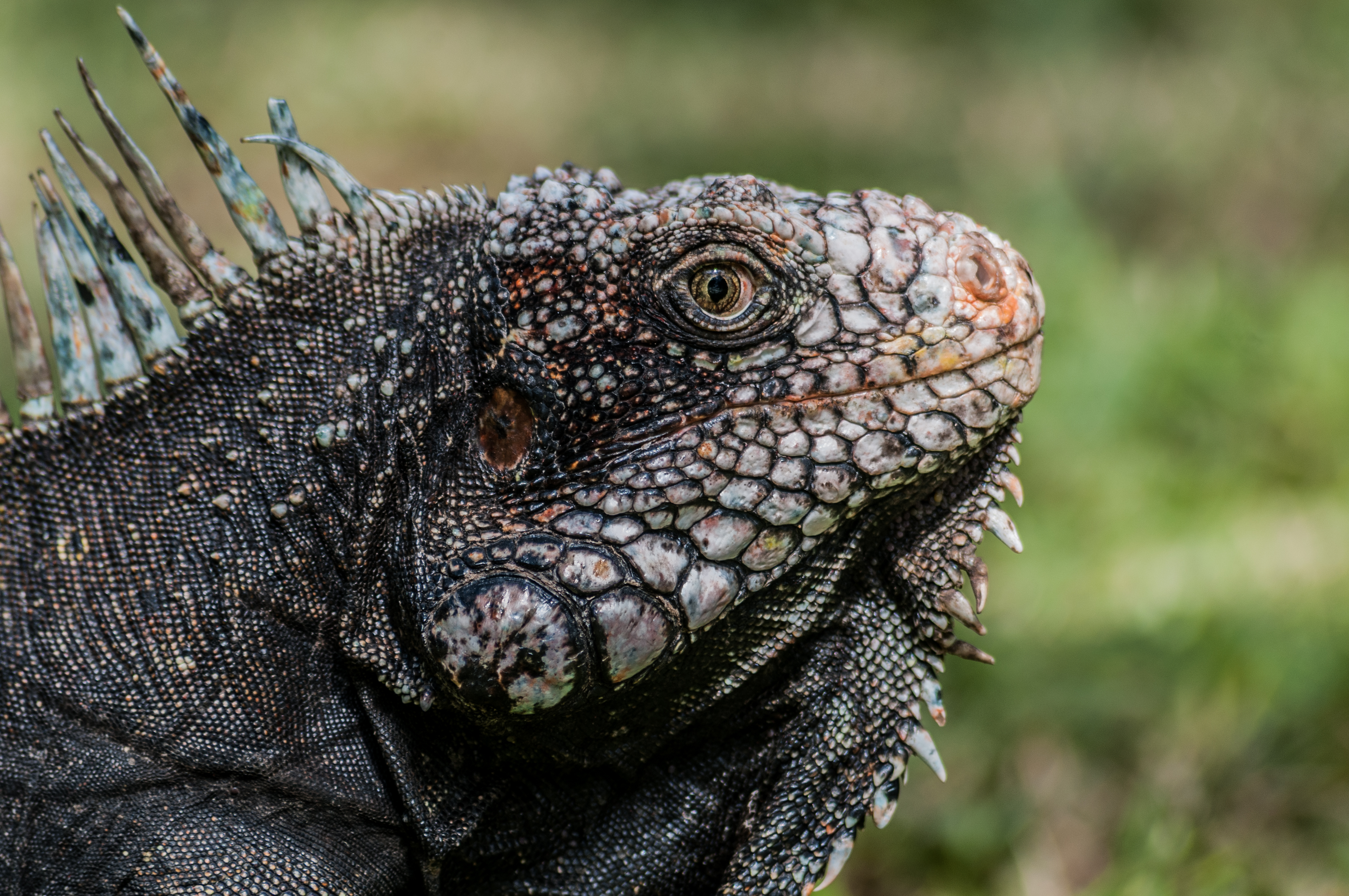
At Bararida Zoological and Botanical Park, Venezuela

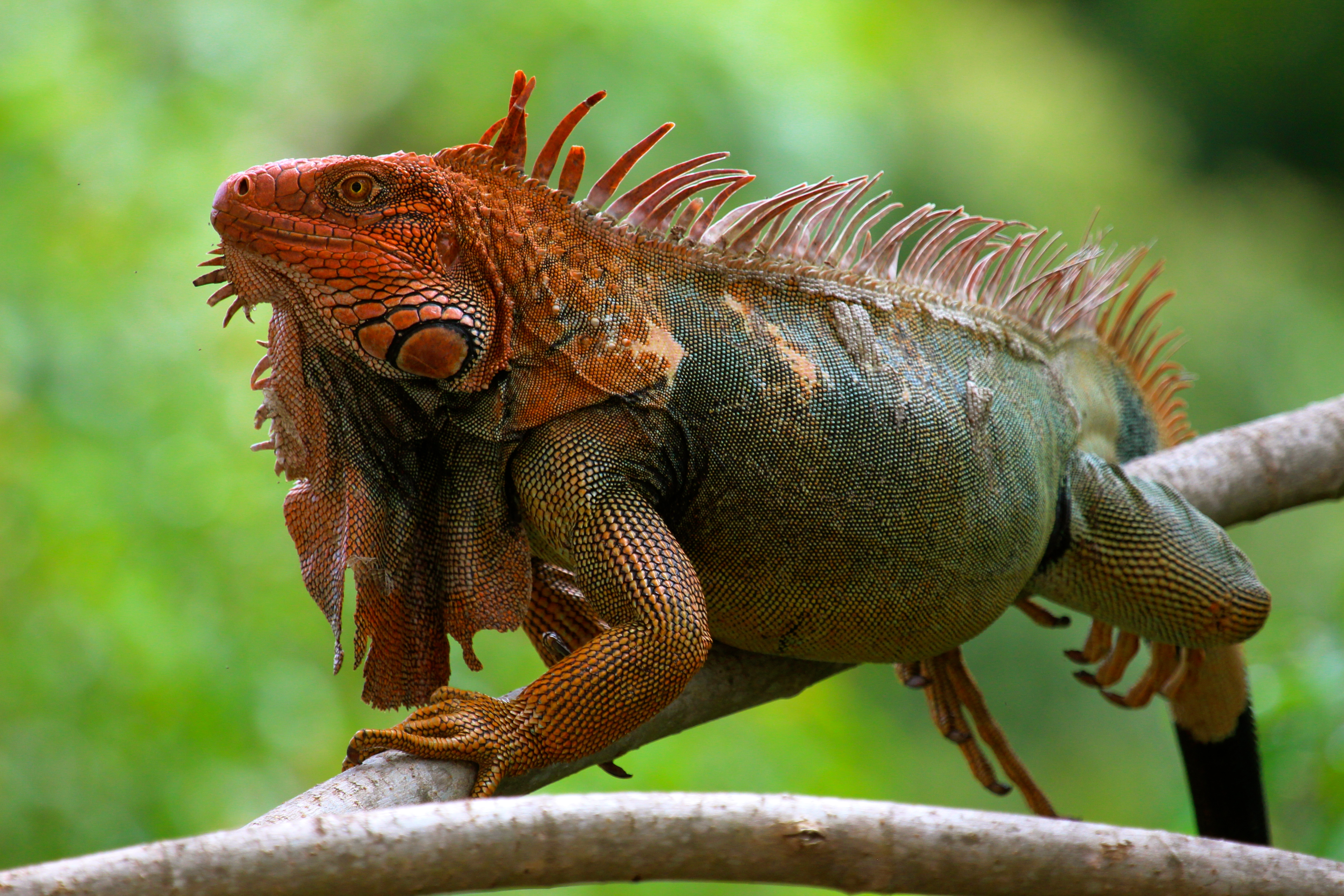
In Puntarenas, Costa Rica

Despite their name, green iguanas occur in different colours and types. In southern countries of their range, such as Peru, green iguanas appear bluish in colour, with bold blue markings. On islands such as Bonaire, Curaçao, Aruba, and Grenada, a green iguana's colour may vary from green to lavender, black, and even reddish brown. Green iguanas from the western region of Costa Rica are red, and animals of the northern ranges, such as Mexico, appear orange. Juvenile green iguanas from El Salvador are often bright blue, but lose this color as they get older. In southeastern Florida, they are seen occasionally in yellow and less often in orange.

Adult iguanas found on most of St. Lucia, mainly on the northeastern coast, Louvette, and Grand Anse, have many differences from other green iguana populations. They are light green with predominant black stripes. Instead of the typical orange dewlap, the iguanas of St. Lucia have a black dewlap. When compared to the common green iguana, females lay about half the number of eggs, 25 instead of 50. Scales to the back of their head, near the jawbone, are smaller. Their irises are white or cream, whereas other green iguanas have yellow irises.

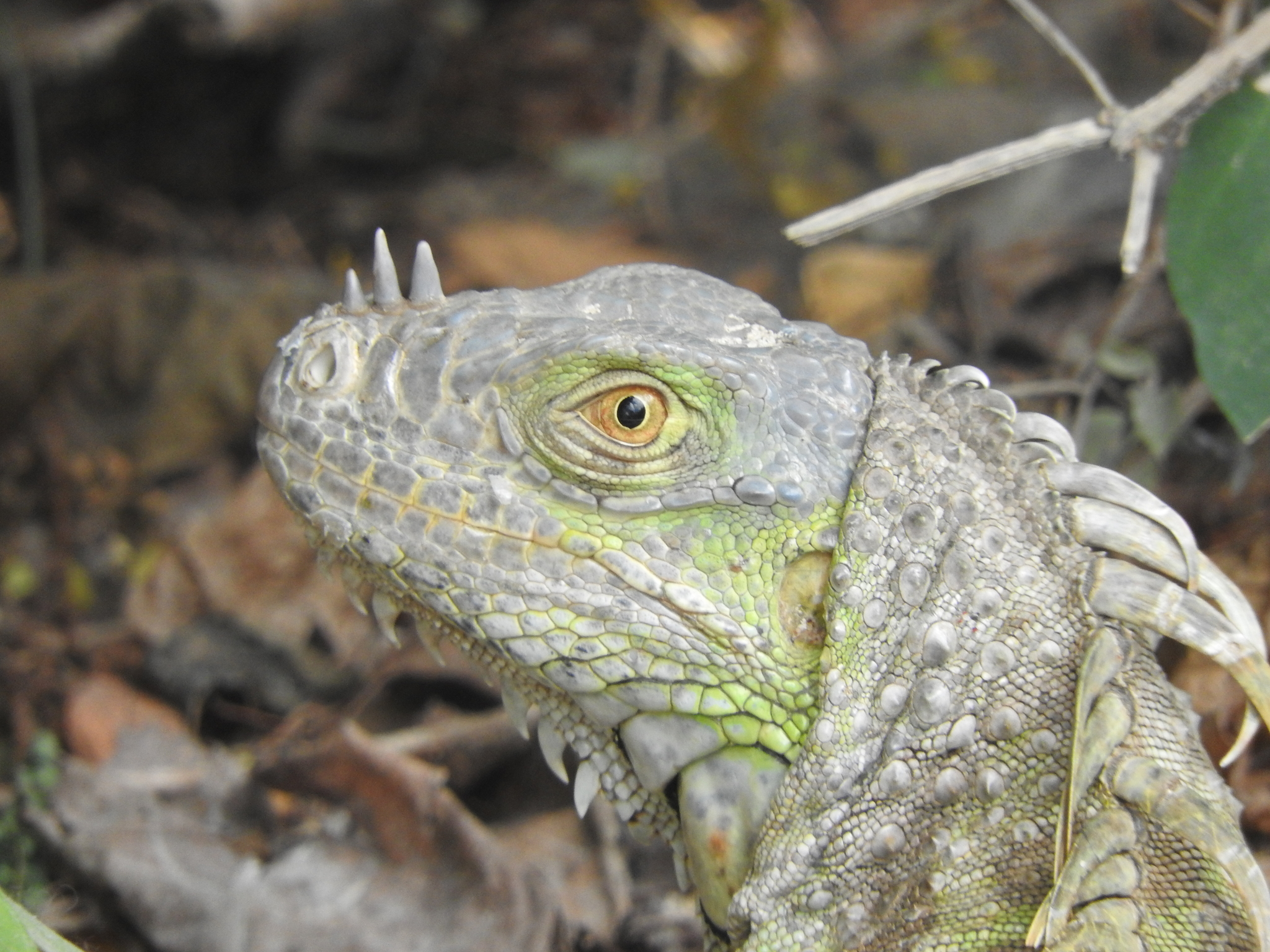
Showing horns, in Quintana Roo, Mexico

Green iguanas from Guatemala and southern Mexico (which may belong to the distinct species I. rhinolopha) predominantly have small horns on their snouts between their eyes and their nostrils, whereas others do not.

=== Senses ===
Green iguanas have excellent vision, enabling them to detect shapes and motions at long distances. As green iguanas have only a few rod cells, they have poor vision in low-light conditions. At the same time, they have cells called double-cone cells that give them sharp color vision and enable them to see ultraviolet wavelengths. This ability is highly useful when basking so they can ensure they absorb enough sunlight to produce vitamin D.

Green iguanas have a white photosensory organ on the top of their heads called the parietal eye (also called the third eye, pineal eye, or pineal gland), in contrast to most other lizards that have lost this primitive feature. This "eye" has only a rudimentary retina and lens and cannot form images, but is sensitive to changes in light and dark and can detect movement. This helps the iguana detect predators stalking it from above.

== Ecology ==
=== Reproductive biology ===
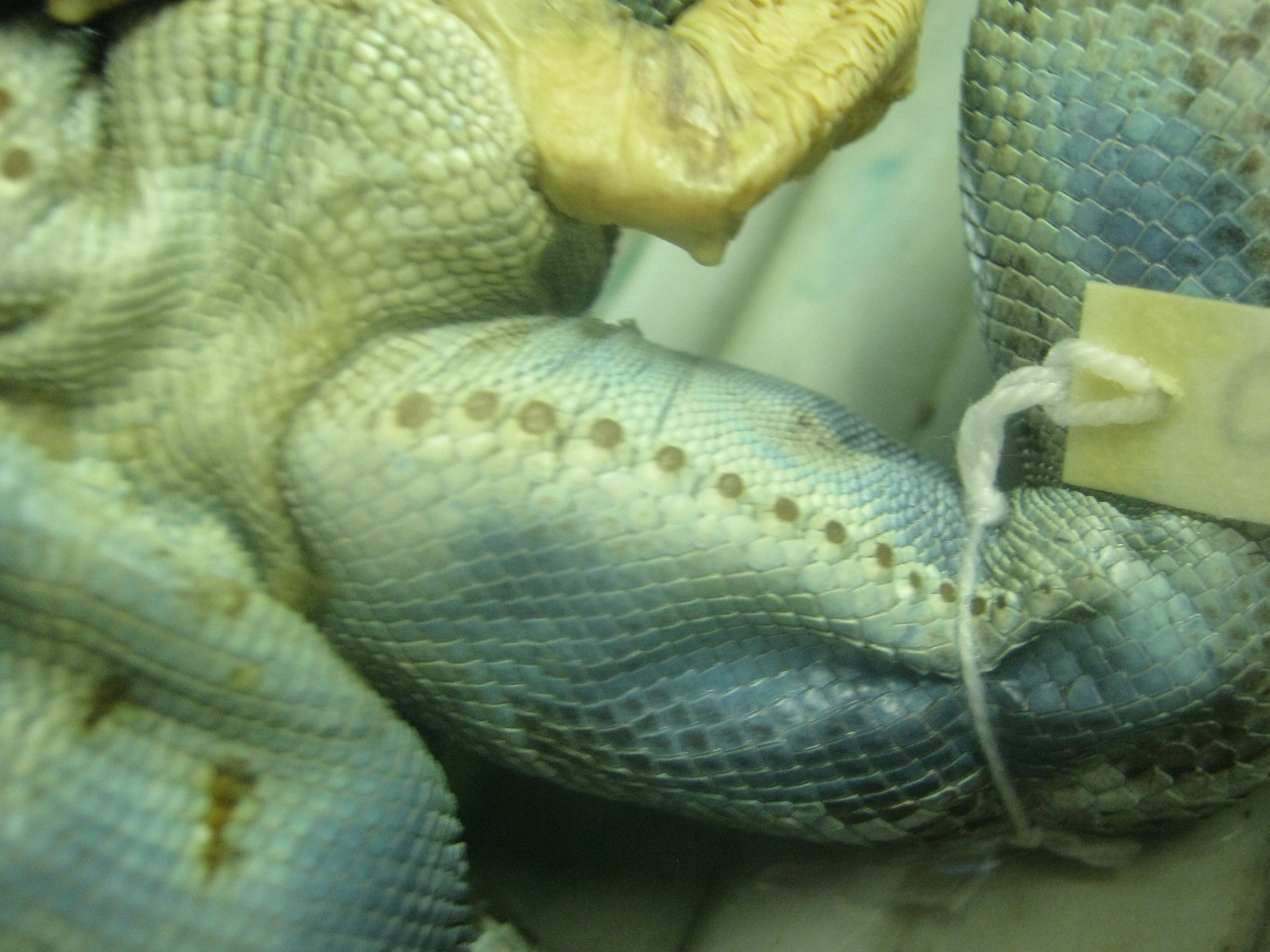
Green iguana femoral pores

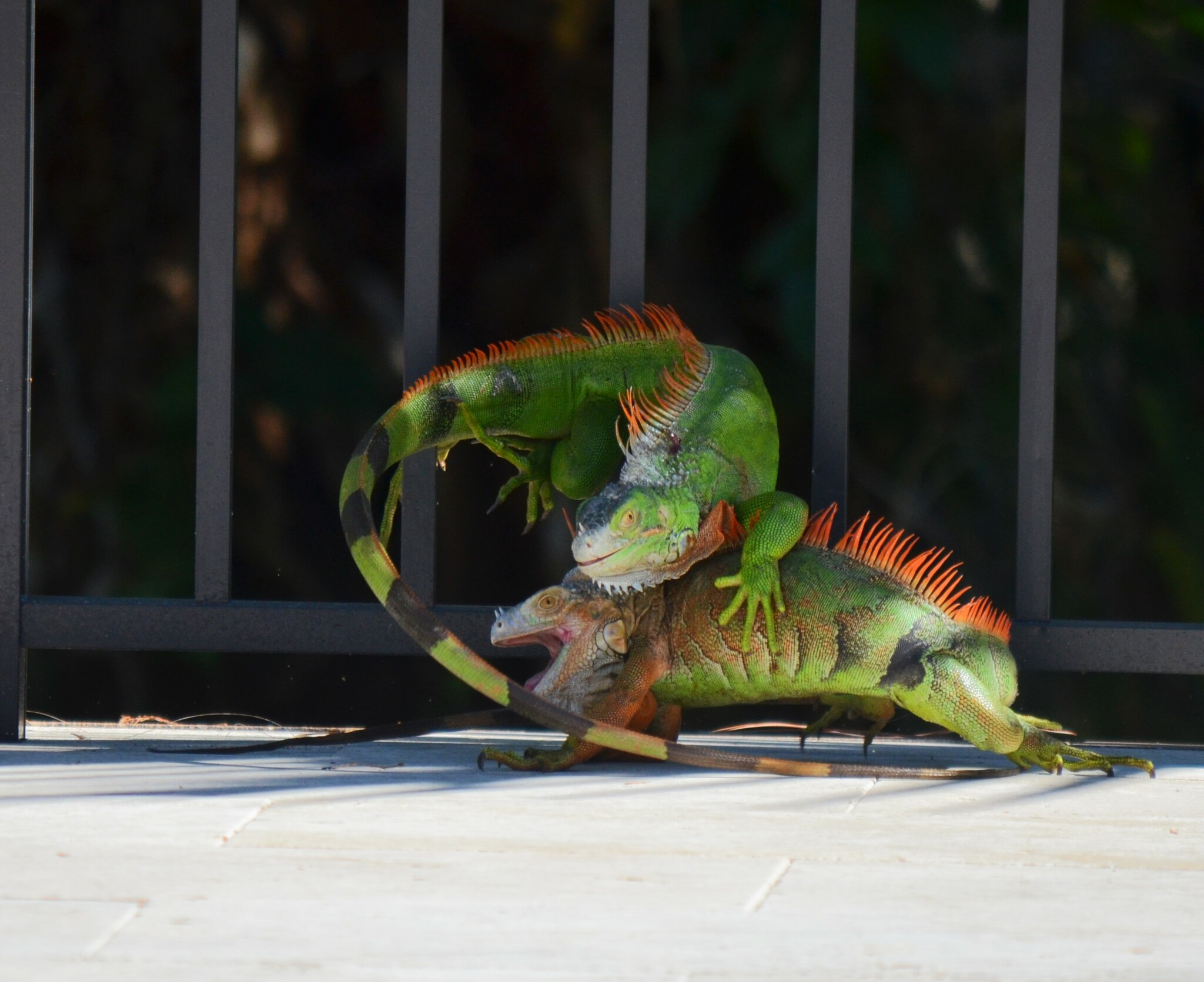
Males fighting, in Florida

Male green iguanas have highly developed femoral pores on the underside of their thighs, which secrete a scent (females have femoral pores, but they are smaller in comparison to those of the males). In addition, the dorsal spines that run along a green iguana's back are noticeably longer and thicker in males than they are in females, making the animals somewhat sexually dimorphic.

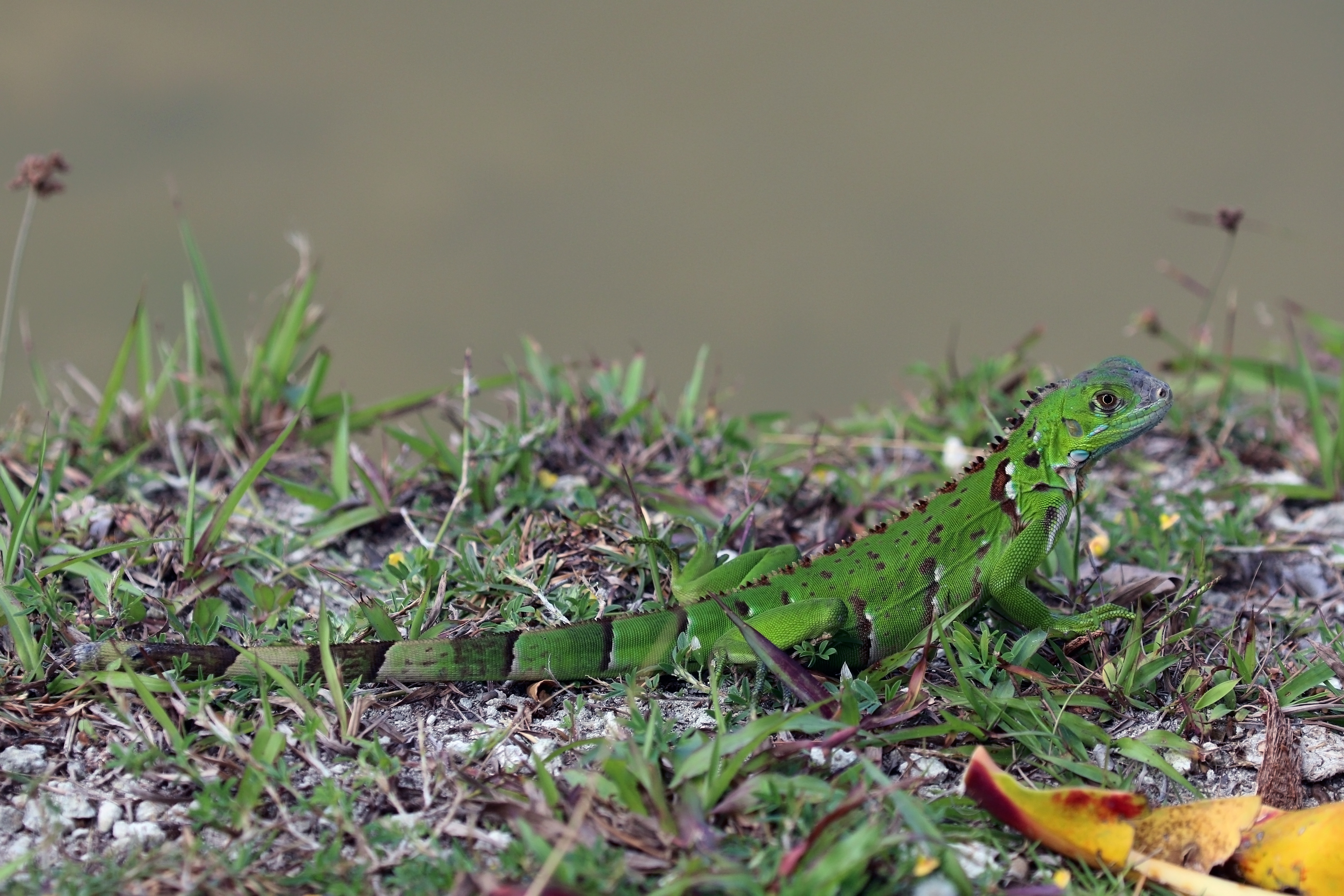
Juvenile at Grand Cayman

Male green iguanas tend to display more dominant behaviors, such as head bobbing and tail whipping. They also tend to develop a taller dorsal crest than females, as well as taller dorsal spines (or spikes). Large, round, very pronounced jowls are generally a male characteristic. Jowls are located under the jaw and are protected by the subtympanic plate, which is a large, green, circular-shaped scale.

Green iguanas are oviparous, with females laying clutches of 20 to 71 eggs once per year during a synchronized nesting period. The female green iguana gives no parental protection after egg laying, apart from defending the nesting burrow during excavation. In Panama, the green iguana has been observed sharing nest sites with American crocodiles, and in Honduras with spectacled caimans.

The hatchlings emerge from the nest after 10–15 weeks of incubation. Once hatched, the young iguanas look similar to the adults in color and shape, resembling adult females more so than males and lacking dorsal spines.

Juveniles stay in familial groups for the first year of their lives. Male green iguanas in these groups often use their own bodies to shield and protect females from predators, and it appears to be the only species of reptile to do this.

=== Behavior ===
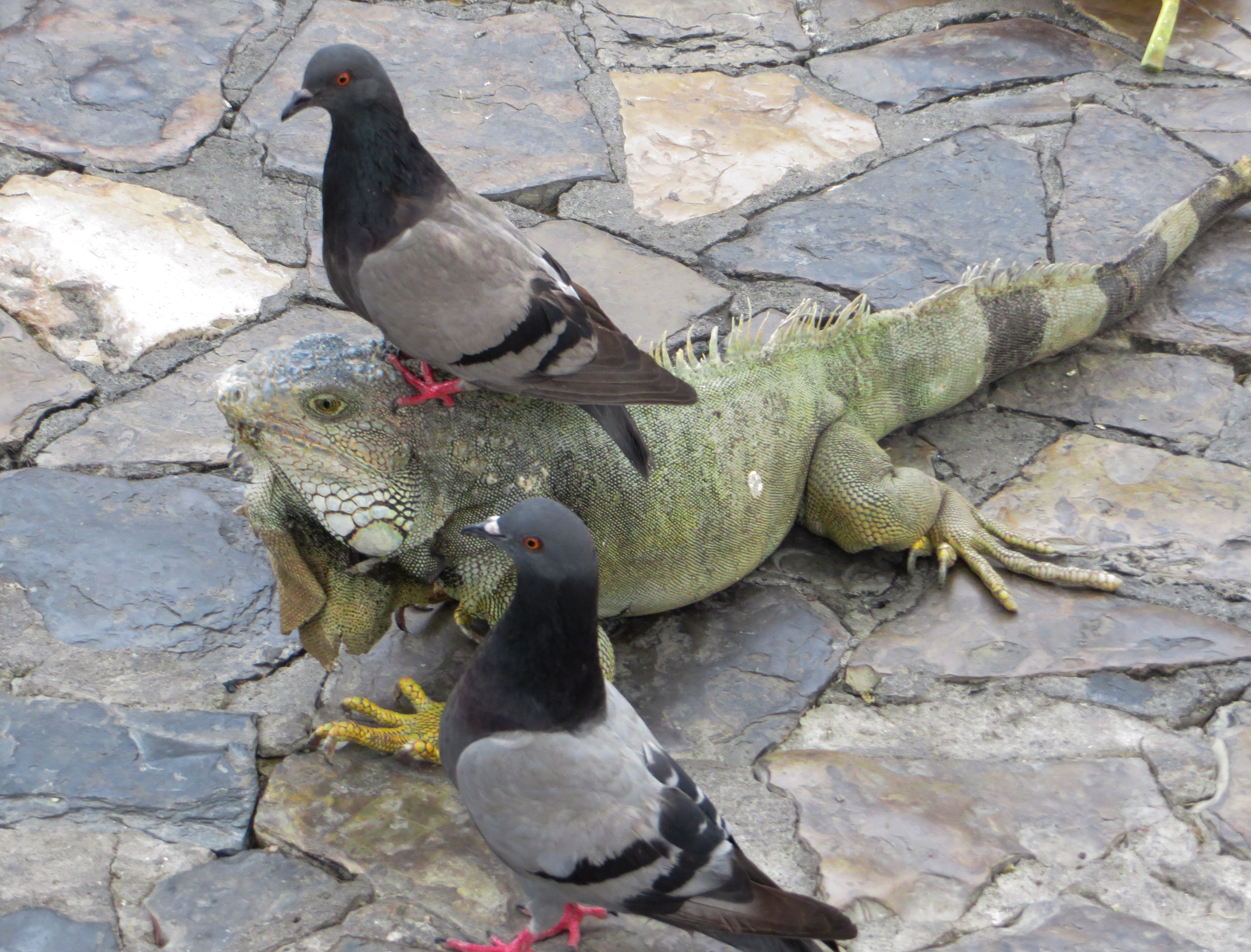
With feral pigeons, in Ecuador

Green iguanas are diurnal, arboreal, and are often found near water. Agile climbers, Iguana iguana can fall up to 15 metres (50 ft) and land unhurt (iguanas use their hind leg claws to clasp leaves and branches to break a fall). During cold, wet weather, green iguanas prefer to stay on the ground for greater warmth. When swimming, iguanas remain submerged, letting their legs hang limply against their sides. They propel through the water with powerful tail strokes.

While they may often be found in trees, these animals are well-known burrowers. The size of their burrow can range from 0.3 to 2.4 metres (1 ft 0 in to 7 ft 10 in) deep, with a diameter of 10 to 20 centimetres (4 to 7 3/4 in). They have been observed burrowing in canals, levees, and dikes and along seawalls in southern Florida. If individuals do not dig their own, they may even use gopher tortoise burrows or usurp those of the Florida burrowing owl.

When frightened by a predator, green iguanas attempt to flee, and if near a body of water, dive into it and swim away. If cornered by a threat, the green iguana extends and displays the dewlap under its neck, stiffens and puffs up its body, hisses, and bobs its head at the aggressor. If the threat persists, the iguana can lash with its tail, bite, and use its claws in defense. The wounded are more inclined to fight than uninjured prey.

Green iguanas use "head bobs" and dewlaps in a variety of ways in social interactions, such as greeting another iguana or to court a possible mate. The frequency and number of head bobs have particular meanings to other iguanas.

=== Ecological role ===
Green iguanas are prey items for a wide range of vertebrate species (at least 108), including at least one record of predation by an amphibian and at least one record of cannibalism.

Female green iguanas dig deep nests, which can be situated in communal nesting sites. Underground complexity of such communal nesting sites is high. Probably similar to the closely related I. delicatissima, nest tunnels and nests are used by a range of different species.

=== Diet ===
Green iguana eating Bougainvillea leaves

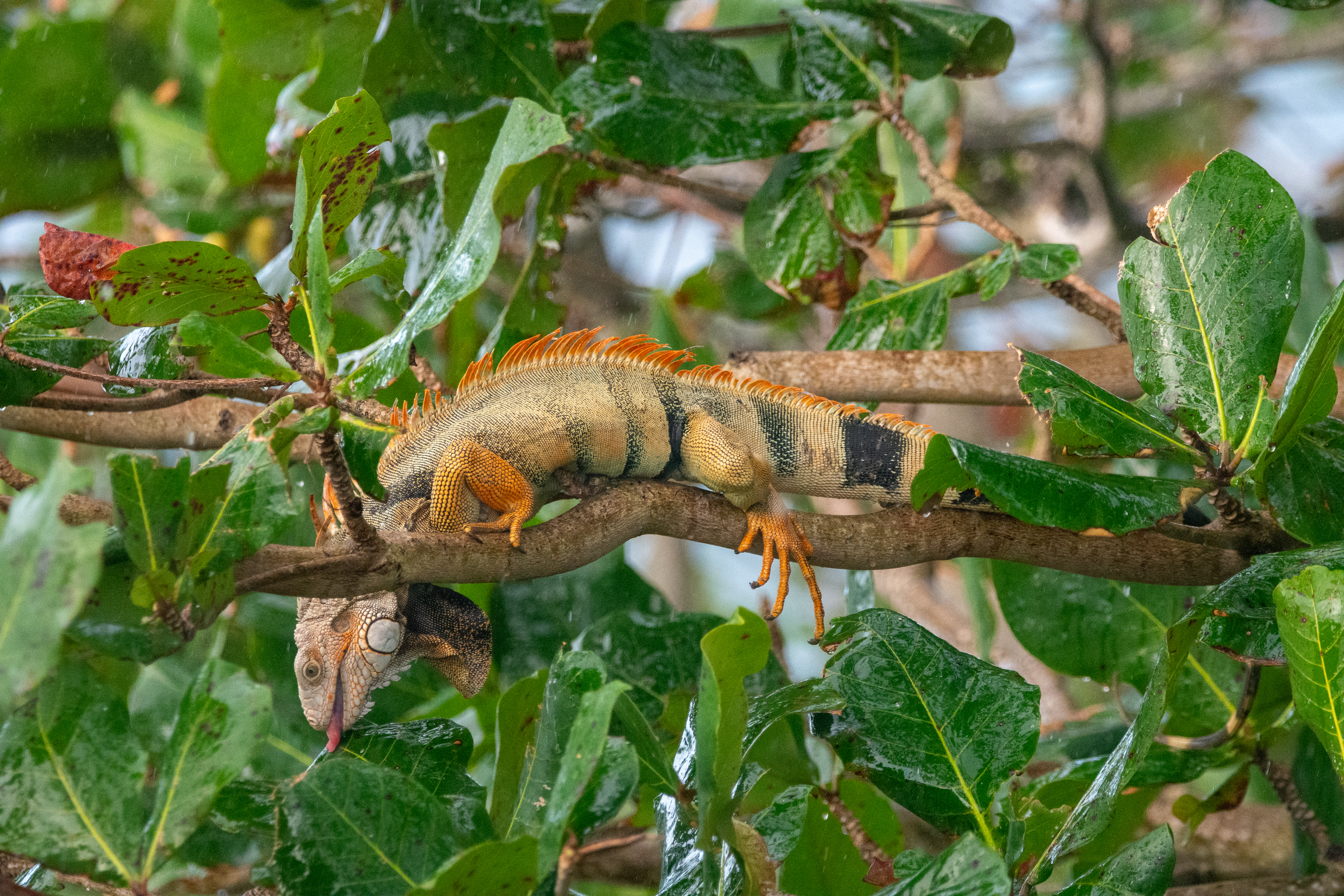
A mating colored iguana drinking water off seagrape leaves (Coccoloba uvifera) during rainfall in Rincón, Puerto Rico.

Green iguanas are primarily herbivores, with captives feeding on leaves such as turnip, mustard, and dandelion greens, flowers, fruit, and growing shoots of upwards of 100 different species of plant. In Panama, one of the green iguana's favorite foods is the wild plum (Spondias mombin). Green iguanas harbor Salmonella as a commensal gut bacterium

Although they consume a wide variety of foods if offered, green iguanas are naturally herbivorous and require a precise ratio of minerals (two to one calcium to phosphorus) in their diet. Captive iguanas must have a variety of leafy greens along with fruits and vegetables such as turnip greens, collard greens, butternut squash, acorn squash, mango, and parsnip. A 1997 study sowed that iguanas in captivity need to be fed a diet of less than 27% neutral detergent fiber in order to maintain maximum rapid growth. Juvenile iguanas often eat feces from adults to acquire the essential microflora to digest their low-quality and hard-to-process vegetation-only diet.

Some debate exists as to whether captive green iguanas should be fed animal protein. Some evidence shows wild iguanas eating grasshoppers and tree snails, usually as a byproduct of eating plant material. Wild adult green iguanas have been observed eating birds' eggs and chicks. They occasionally eat a small amount of carrion or invertebrates. Zoologists, such as Adam Britton, believe that such a diet containing protein is unhealthy for iguana's digestive systems, resulting in severe long-term health damage, including kidney failure and leading to premature death. On the other side of the argument is that green iguanas at the Miami Seaquarium in Key Biscayne, Florida, have been observed eating dead fish, and individuals kept in captivity have been known to eat mice without any ill effects. De Vosjoli writes that captive animals have been known to survive and thrive on eating nothing but whole rodent block, or monkey chow, and one instance of romaine lettuce with vitamin and calcium supplements. When found in unnatural habitats, especially those of high human population, they have also been known to feed on human garbage and poultry feces.

=== As an invasive species ===
==== Caribbean ====
In the aftermath of Hurricane Luis and Hurricane Marilyn in 1995, a raft of uprooted trees carrying 15 or more green iguanas landed on the eastern side of Anguilla – an island where green iguanas had never been recorded before. These iguanas were apparently accidentally caught on the trees and rafted 320 km (200 mi) across the ocean from Guadeloupe, where green iguanas are an introduced species. Examination of the weather patterns and ocean currents indicated that the iguanas had probably spent three weeks at sea before arriving on Anguilla. Evidence of this new colony breeding on the island was found within two years of its arrival.

In February 2012, the government of Puerto Rico proposed that the islands' iguanas, which were said to have a population of 4 million and considered to be a non-native nuisance, be eradicated and sold for meat.

Iguanas have especially established introduced populations on islands in the Lesser Antilles, such as most of the French West Indies, Saint Martin (island) and Dominica. On Sint Eustatius and Saba (island) occasionally non-native iguanas from neighbouring Sint Maarten arrive, these remaining few in number and are being actively removed.

==== Fiji ====
The green iguana is present as an invasive species on some of the islands of Fiji, where it is known as the American iguana. It poses a threat to the native iguanas through the potential spread of disease and to humans by spreading Salmonella. They were initially brought to Qamea in 2000 by an American who wanted them to eat the numerous insects on the island, although they are primarily herbivorous. They are now on the islands of Laucala, Matagi and Taveuni.

==== United States ====
The green iguana is established on Oahu and Maui, Hawaii, as a feral invasive species, despite strict legislation banning the importation of any reptiles, and in the Rio Grande Valley of Texas. As most reptiles carry Salmonella spp., this is a concern and a reason legislation has been sought to regulate the trade in green iguanas.

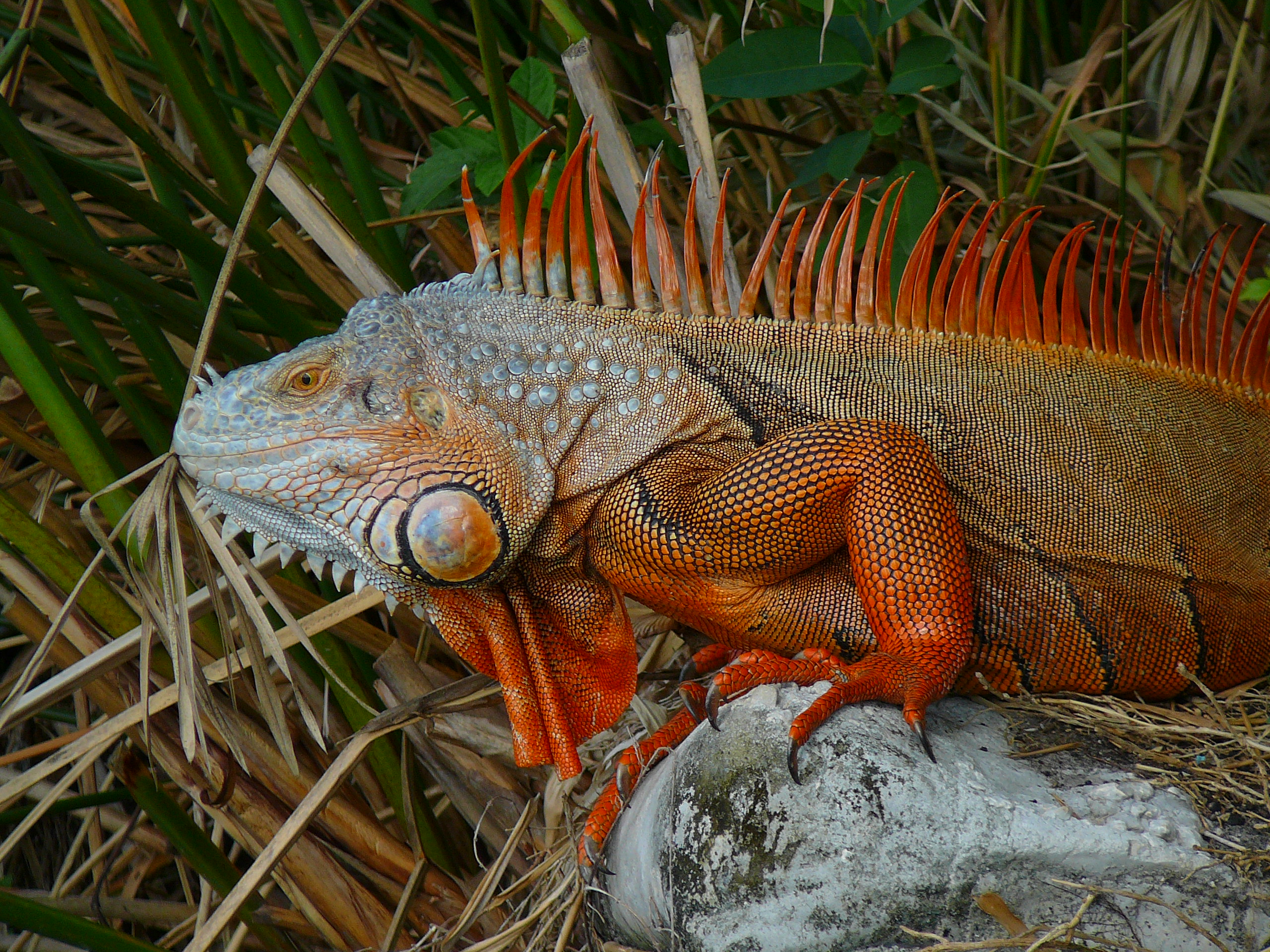
In Florida

Due to a combination of events, the green iguana is considered an invasive species in South Florida, and is found along the east coast, as well as the Gulf Coast, of Florida from Key West to Pinellas County. The original small populations in the Florida Keys were stowaways on ships carrying fruit from South America. Over the years, other iguanas were introduced into the wild, mostly originating through the pet trade. Some escaped and some were intentionally released by their owners; these iguanas survived and then thrived in their new habitat. They commonly hide in the attics of houses and on beaches. They often destroy gardens and landscaping. They seem to be fond of eating a native endangered plant, Cordia globosa, and feeding on nickernut (Caesalpinia) a primary food plant of the endangered Miami blue butterfly (Cyclargus thomasi bethunebakeri); additionally on Marco Island, green iguanas have been observed using the burrows of the Florida burrowing owl (Athene cunicularia floridana), a species of special concern, all of which can make them more of a serious threat to Florida's ecosystem than originally believed. Currently, the damage green iguanas have caused has become significant and expected to increase, but controversy remains on how to deal with the problem. For example, according to Florida Fish and Wildlife Conservation Commission green iguanas are not protected in Florida except by anti-cruelty law and can be humanely killed on private property with landowner permission.

In January 2008, large numbers of iguanas established in Florida dropped from the trees in which they lived, due to unseasonably cold nights that put them in a state of torpor and caused them to lose their grip on the tree branches. Though no specific numbers were provided by local wildlife officials, local media described the phenomenon as a "frozen iguana shower" in which dozens "littered" local bike paths. Upon the return of daytime warmth, many (but not all) of the iguanas "woke up" and resumed their normal activities. This occurred again in January 2010, January 2018, December 2020, and in late January 2026, after prolonged cold fronts once again hit southern Florida. During the latter cold front, a temporary executive order allowed for the public to collect cold-stunned lizards without a permit. As of February 4, 2026, a total of 5,195 cold-stunned green iguanas had been turned into the Florida Fish and Wildlife Conservation Commission to be euthanized.

Hunters and hunting guides which cater to tourists in South Florida have started to target invasive Green Iguanas.

==== Taiwan ====
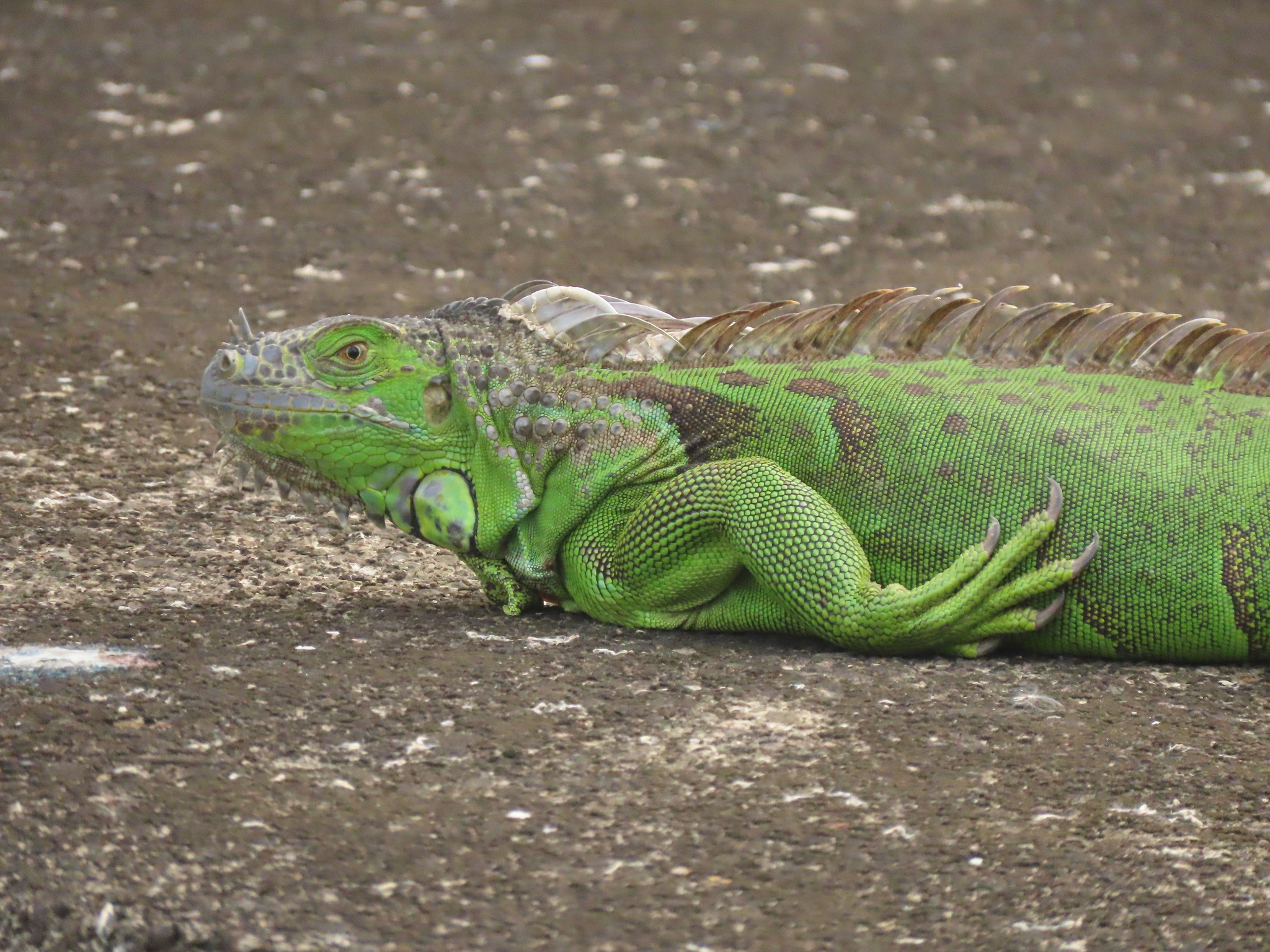
In Taiwan

In the 21st century the green iguana has become a harmful invasive species in Taiwan which does significant damage to farms. In order to reduce their population the government has issued annual bounties on them. They are often hunted with slingshots. In 2025 the Ministry of Agriculture (Taiwan) set a quota of 120,000 for the green iguana control program.

==== Other countries ====
Iguanas are also present on southern Japan's Ishigaki Island, and in Singapore and Thailand.

== Captivity ==
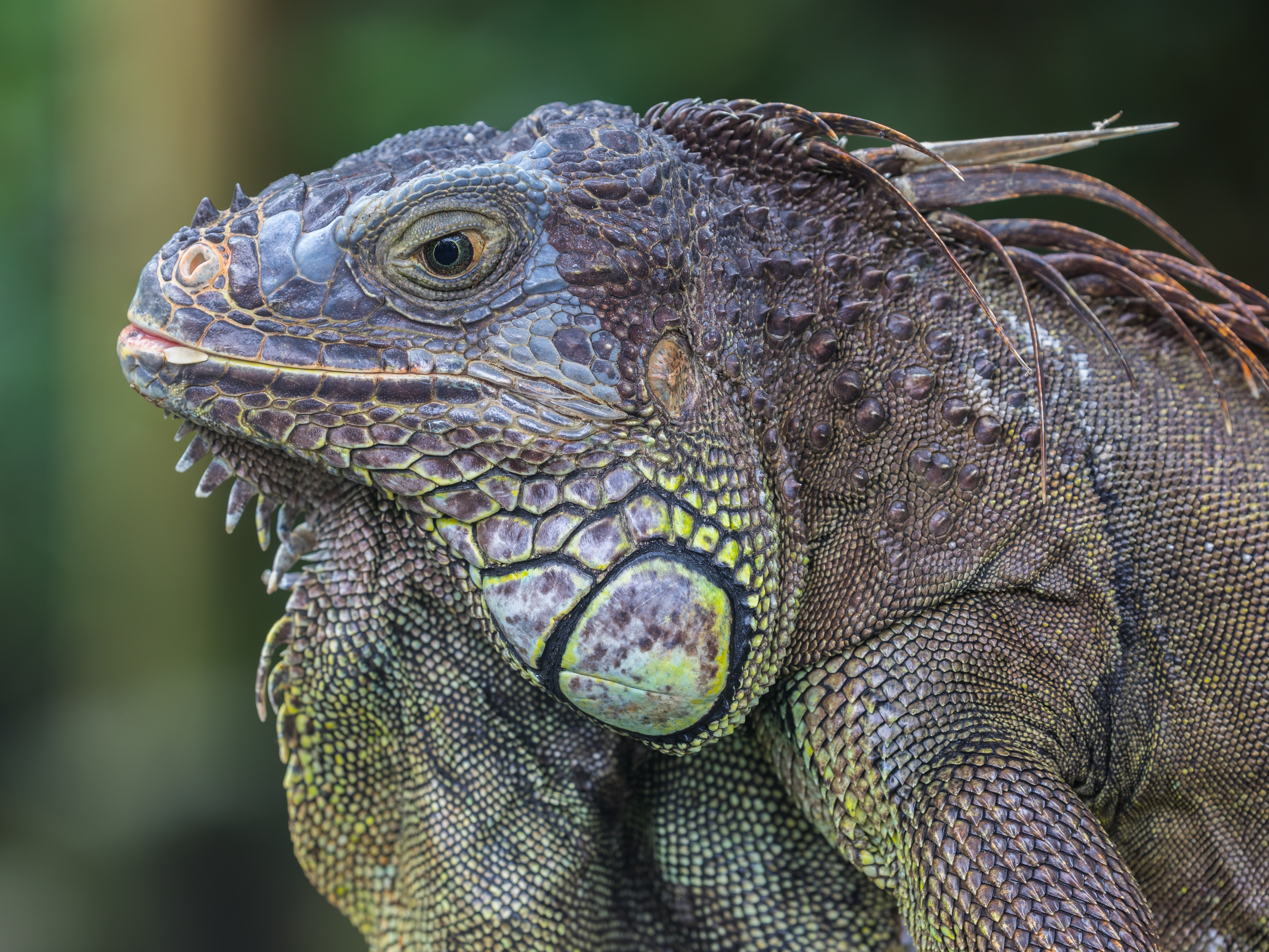
At the Singapore Zoo

Green iguanas are by far the most globally traded reptiles, representing 46% of the total reptile trade in the US from 1996 and 2012, with annual imports reaching 1 million in 1996. The American pet trade has put a great demand on the green iguana; 800,000 iguanas were imported into the U.S. in 1995 alone, primarily originating from captive farming operations based in their native countries (Honduras, El Salvador, Colombia, and Panama). However, these animals are demanding to care for properly over their lifetimes, and many die within a few years of acquisition.

Recently, an increase in illegal trading has been identified, and a trade ban for transport within and out from the Lesser Antilles was suggested.

Green iguanas thrive only in temperatures of 79 °F (26 °C) to 95 °F (35 °C) and must have appropriate sources of UVB and UVA lighting, or else their bodies cannot produce vitamin D that promotes calcium absorption, which can result in a metabolic bone disease that can be fatal. They are often kept as exotic pets. In some locales (such as New York City and Hawaii), ownership of iguanas is prohibited. Due to the potential impact of an introduced species on Hawaii's ecosystem, the state has strict regulations regarding the import and possession of green iguanas; violators can spend three years in jail and be fined up to $200,000.

== Conservation ==
The green iguana is listed under Appendix II of the Convention on International Trade in Endangered Species (CITES), meaning that international trade is regulated through the CITES permit system. In addition, the green iguana is listed as Least Concern by the IUCN, with a mention of habitat depletion from development being a possible concern for green iguana populations in the future. Historically, green iguana meat and eggs have been eaten as a source of protein throughout their native range, and are prized for their alleged medicinal and aphrodisiac properties. In the past, there have been efforts to raise green iguanas in captivity as a food source in an attempt to encourage more sustainable land use in Panama and Costa Rica.

The green iguana has become rare in parts of its native range of Central and South America due to hunting of wild iguanas for food, where iguanas have received the nickname gallina de palo ("bamboo chicken" or "chicken of the trees"). Overhunting resulted in a partial closure of markets in Nicaragua in 1976, while the government of Panama had taken action by the late 1960s to protect iguanas.

In 2020, iguana researchers collaborated to create an extended and 'live' database on genetic variation within the green iguana. The intent of the database is primarily to guide population management, hybrid identification, and monitoring of invasions and illegal trade.

== Cultural references ==
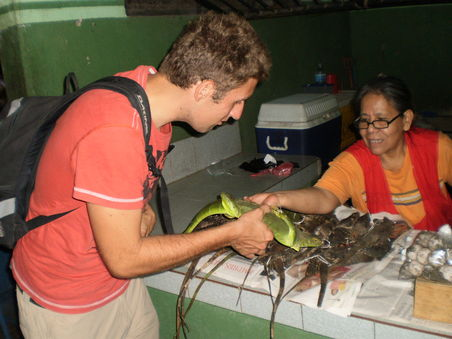
Although eating green iguanas is forbidden in Nicaragua, they are available in markets.

The Moche people of ancient Peru worshipped animals and often depicted green iguanas in their art. The green iguana and its relative the black iguana (Ctenosaura similis) have been used as a food source in Central and South America for the past 7,000 years. It is possible that some of the populations in the Caribbean were translocated there from the mainland by various tribes as a food source. In Central and South America, green iguanas are still used as a source of meat and are often referred to as gallina de palo ("bamboo chicken" or "chicken of the tree"), because they are said to taste like chicken.

== Gallery ==
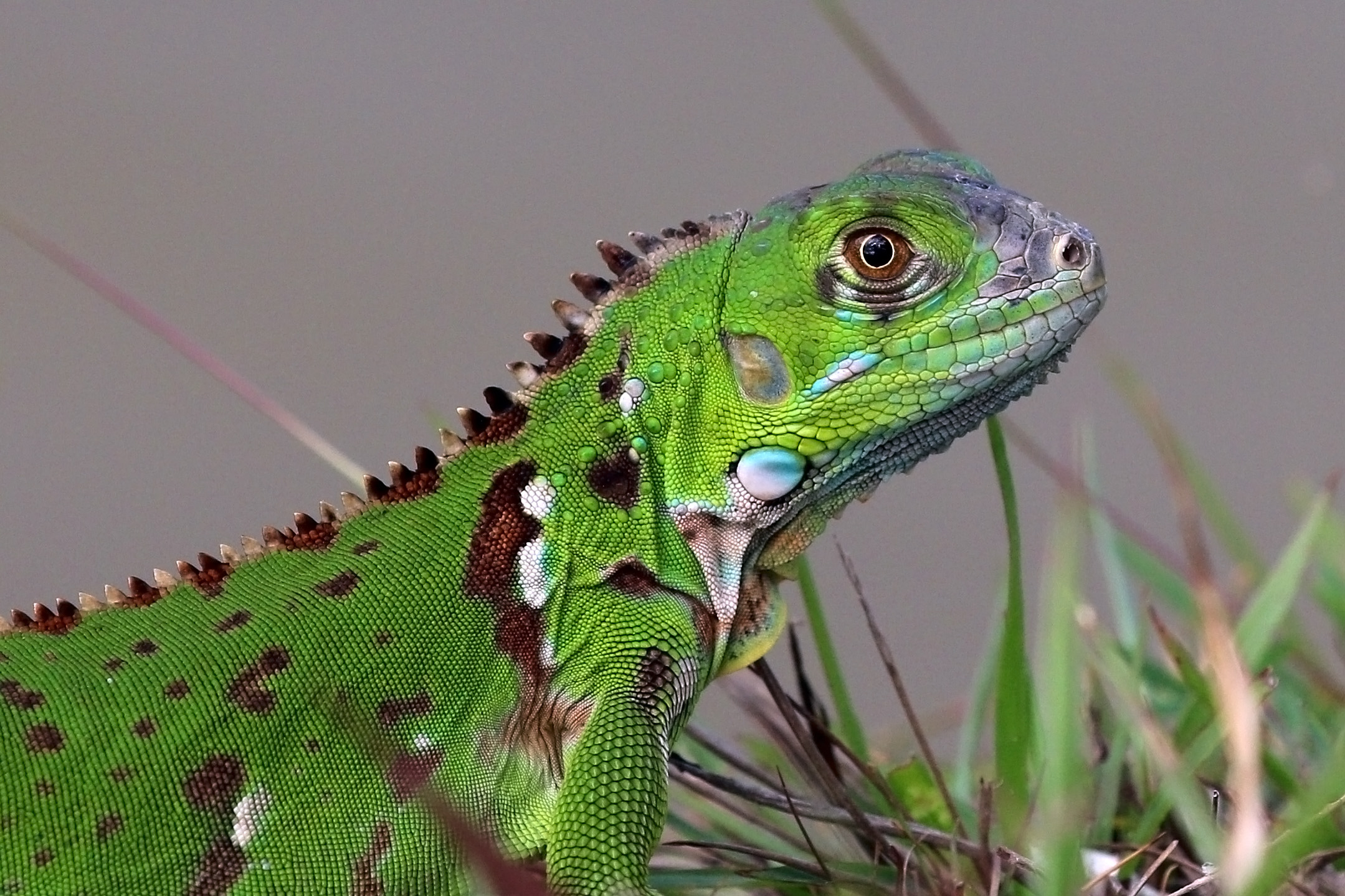
Juvenile green iguana, Grand Cayman

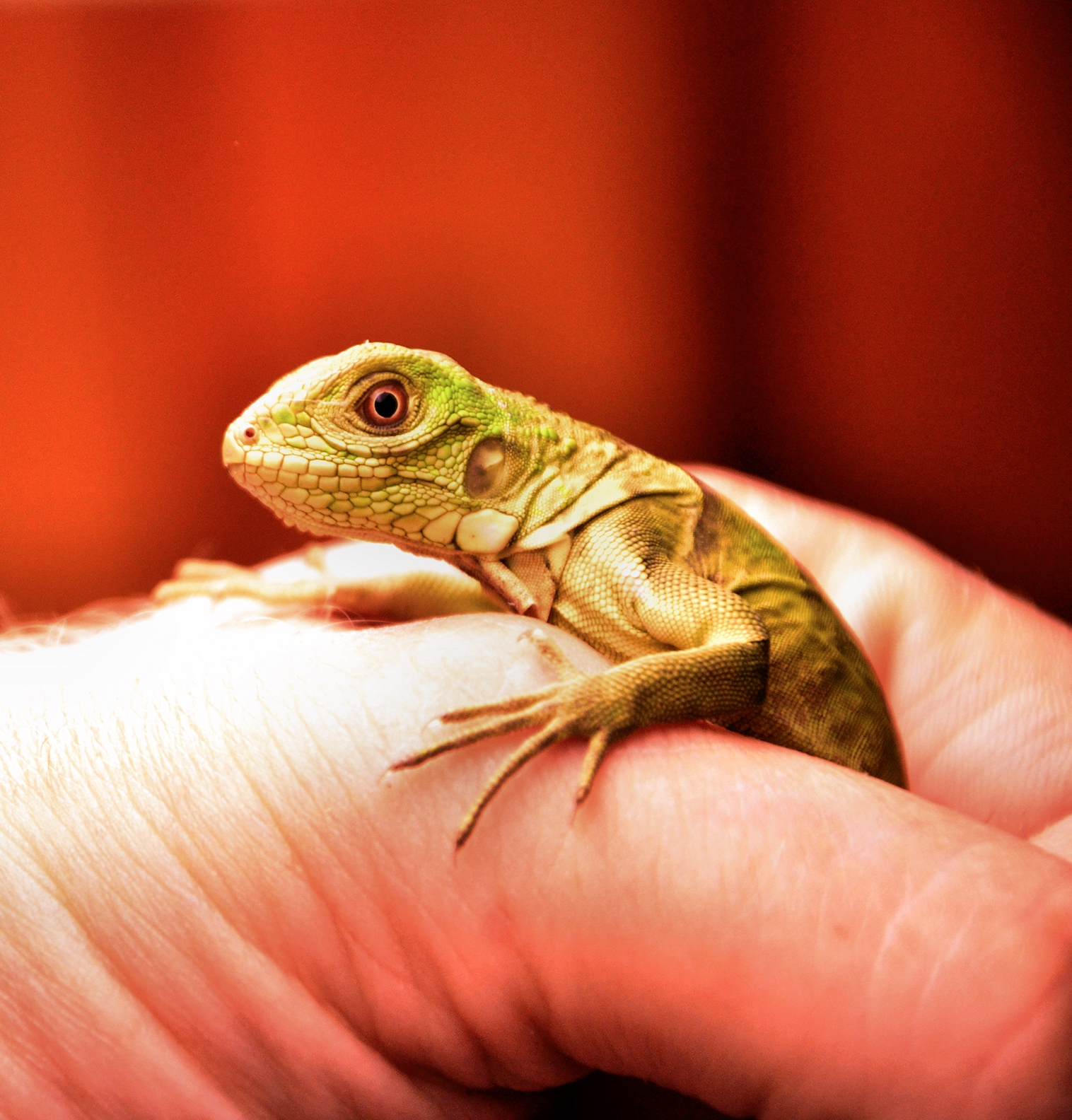
Young juvenile green iguana, found indoors in Curaçao

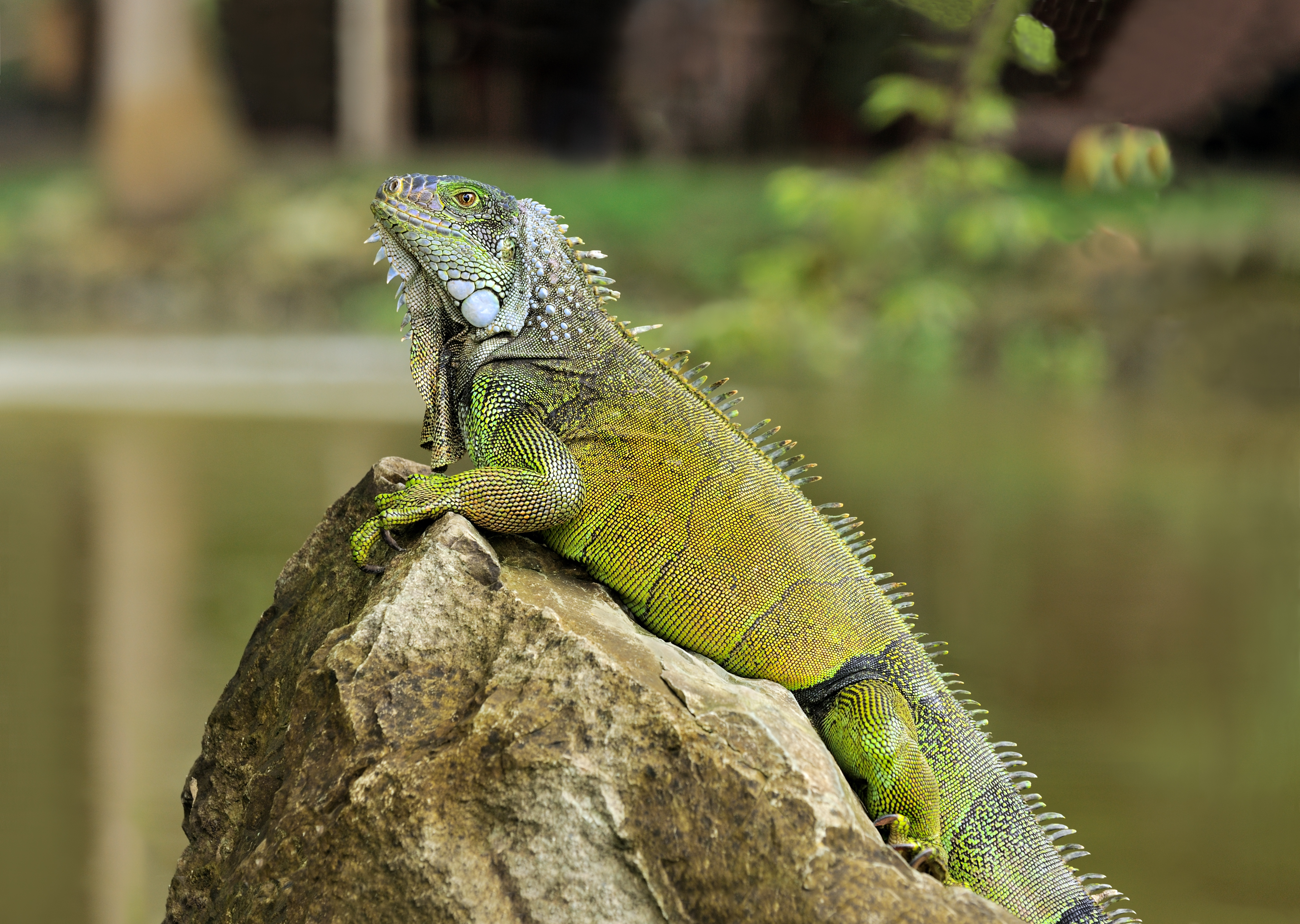
At the Botanical Garden at Portoviejo, Ecuador

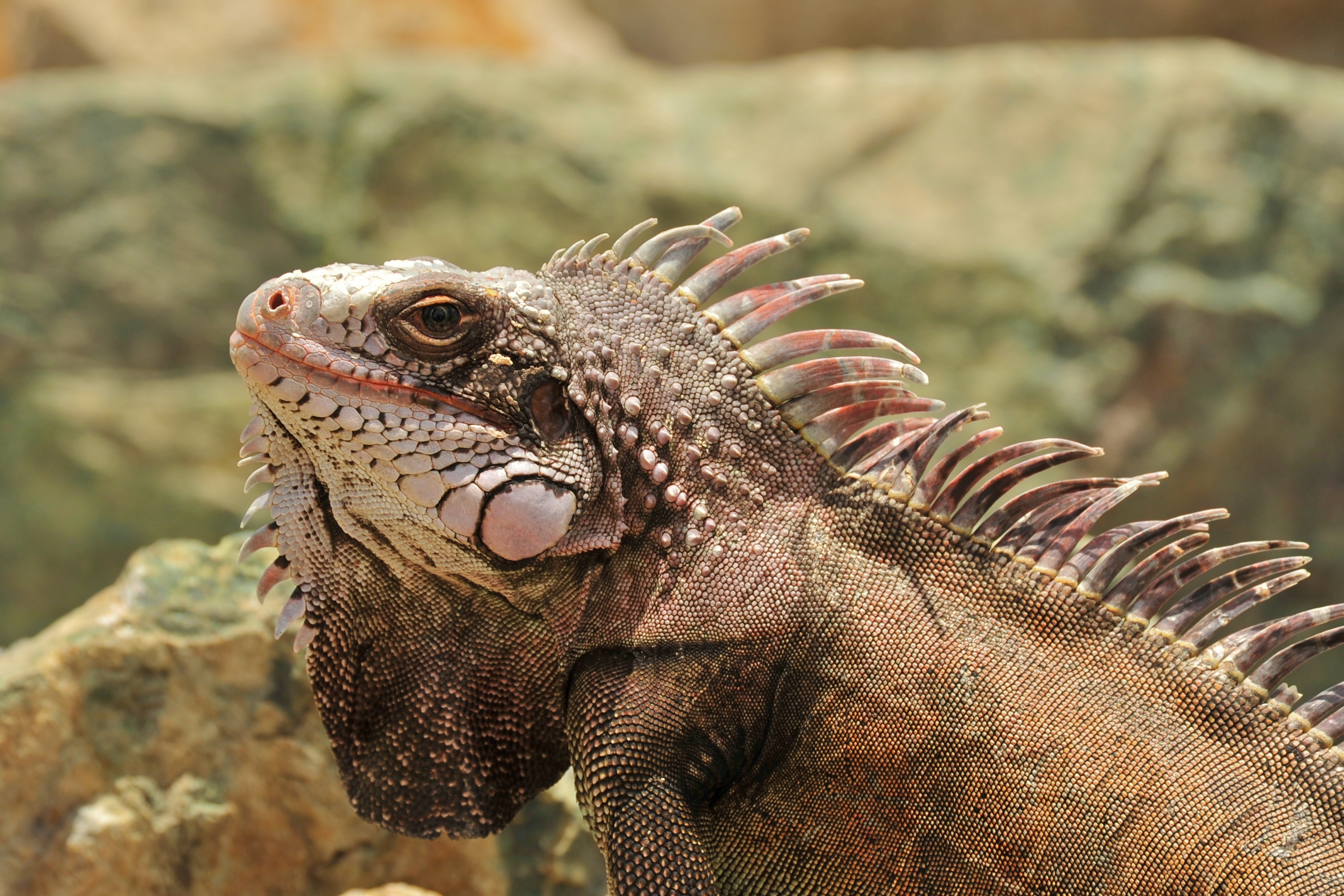
At Saint Thomas, U.S. Virgin Islands (possibly Iguana iguana melanoderma instead)
