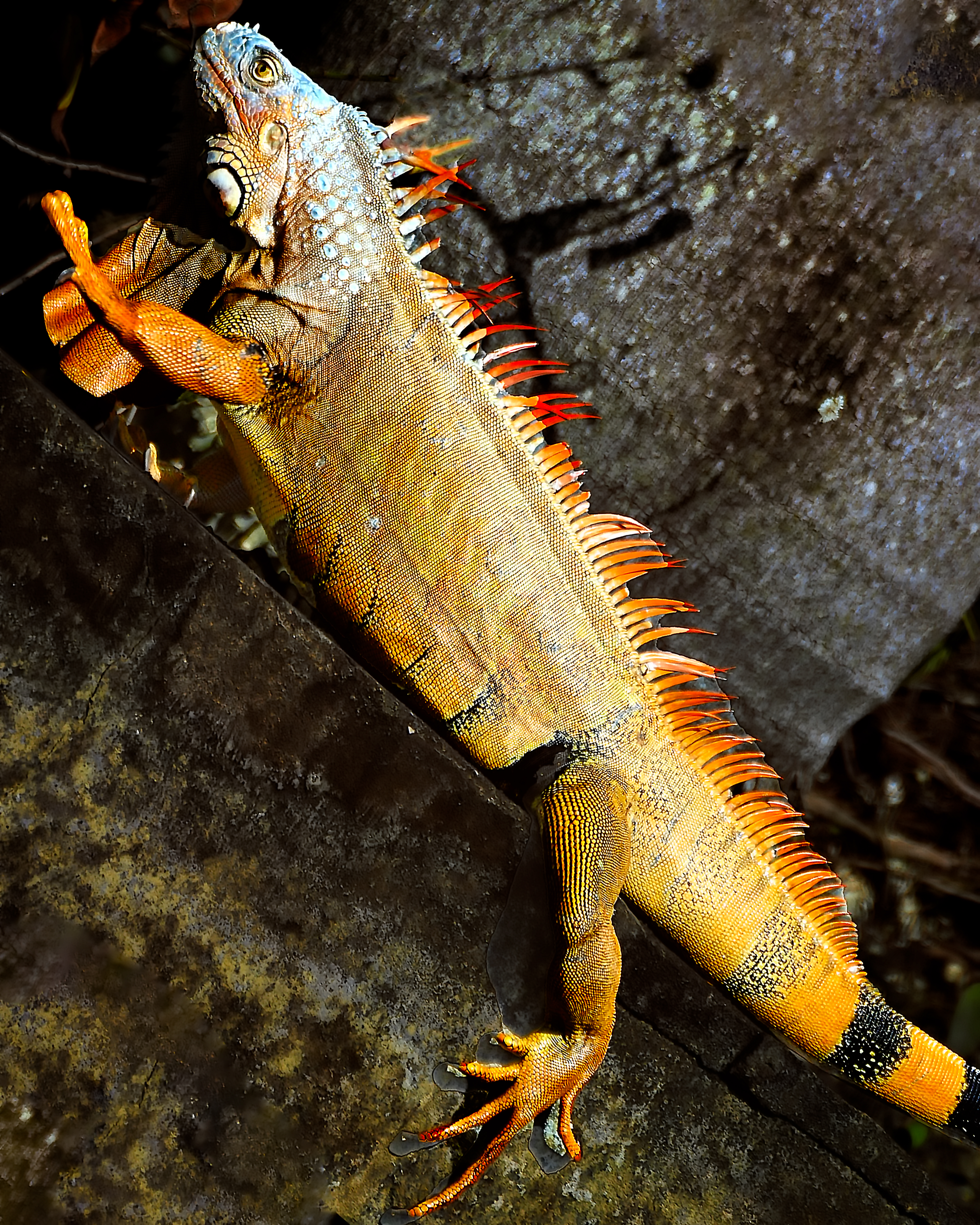
- A green iguana (Iguana iguana)

Conservation status
- CITES Appendix II

Scientific classification
- Kingdom: Animalia
- Phylum: Chordata
- Class: Reptilia
- Order: Squamata
- Suborder: Iguania
- Family: Iguanidae
- Genus: Iguana; Laurenti, 1768

Type species
- Lacerta iguana Linnaeus, 1758

Species
- Lesser Antillean iguana, I. delicatissima; Green iguana, I. iguana

Synonyms
- Hypsilophus Wagler, 1830

= Iguana =

Iguana Temporal range: Holocene–Recent

Reptile genus of herbivorous lizards

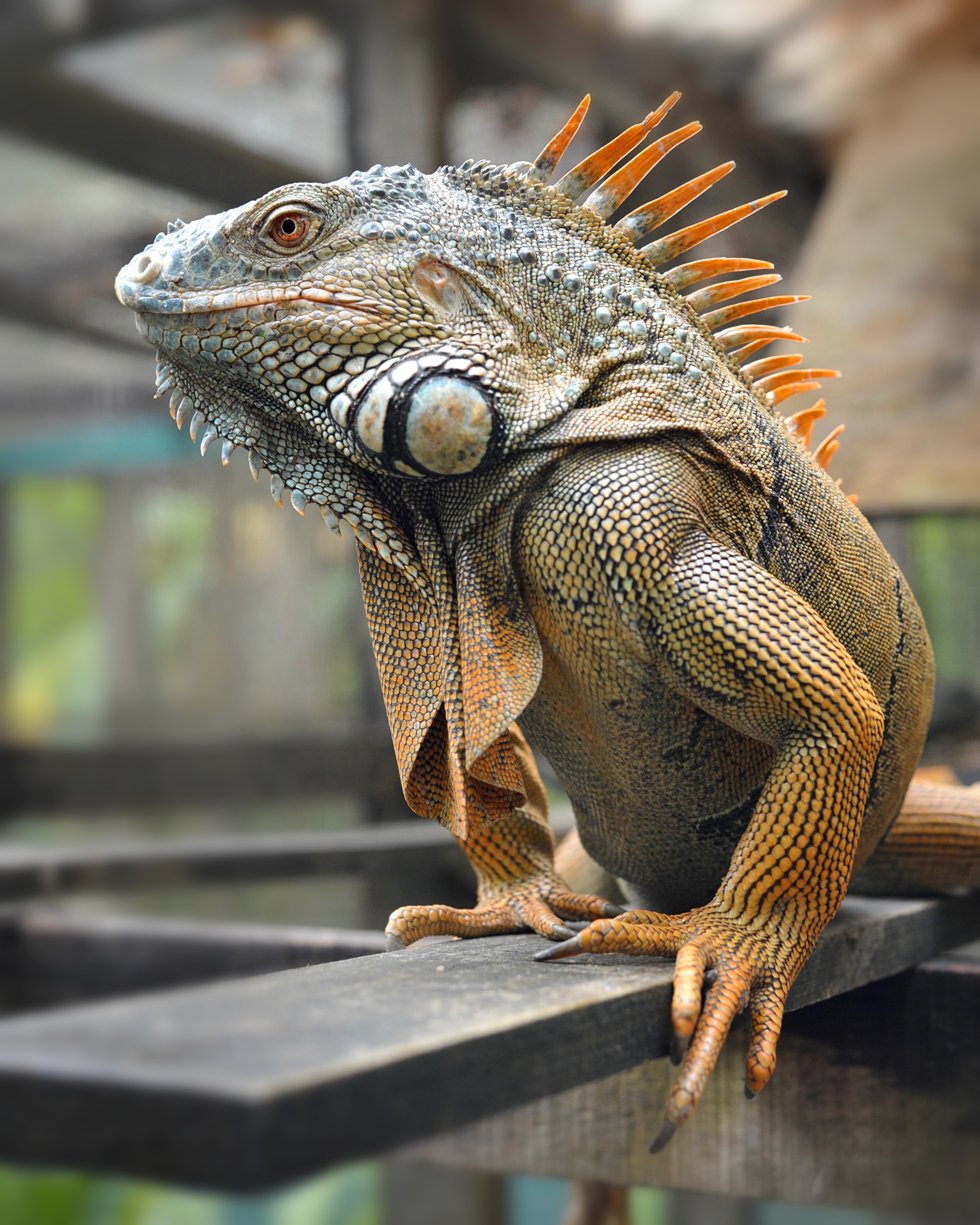
A male green iguana

Iguana (/ɪˈɡwɑːnə/, Spanish: [iˈɣwana]) is a genus of herbivorous lizards that are native to tropical areas of Mexico, Central America, South America, and the Caribbean. The genus was first described by Austrian naturalist J.N. Laurenti in 1768. Two species are placed in the genus: The green iguana, which is widespread throughout its range and a popular pet; and the Lesser Antillean iguana, which is native to the Lesser Antilles. Genetic analysis indicates that the green iguana may comprise a complex of multiple species, some of which have been recently described, but the Reptile Database considers all of these as subspecies of the green iguana.

The word "iguana" is derived from the original Taino name for the species, iwana. In addition to the two species in the genus Iguana, several other related genera in the same family have common names of the species including the word "iguana".

The species is a popular quarry for pets, and non-native animals have been widely introduced beyond its native area, into Ishigaki Island, the Florida Peninsula, Hawaii, Singapore, Thailand, Taiwan, and including numerous islands with native Iguana populations in the Lesser Antilles.

== Anatomy and physiology ==
Iguanas are large lizards that can range from 1.2 to 2.0 m (4 to 6.5 ft) in length, including their tails. They possess a dewlap and a row of elongated scales running from the midline of their necks down to their tails. Iguanas have varying types of scales covering different areas of their body; for example, some large, round tuberculate scales are scattered around the lateral region of the neck among smaller, overlapping scales. The scales on the dorsal trunk of their bodies are also thicker and more tightly packed than those on the ventral sides. These scales may be a variety of colors and are not always visible from close distances. They have a large, round scale on their cheeks known as a subtympanic shield.

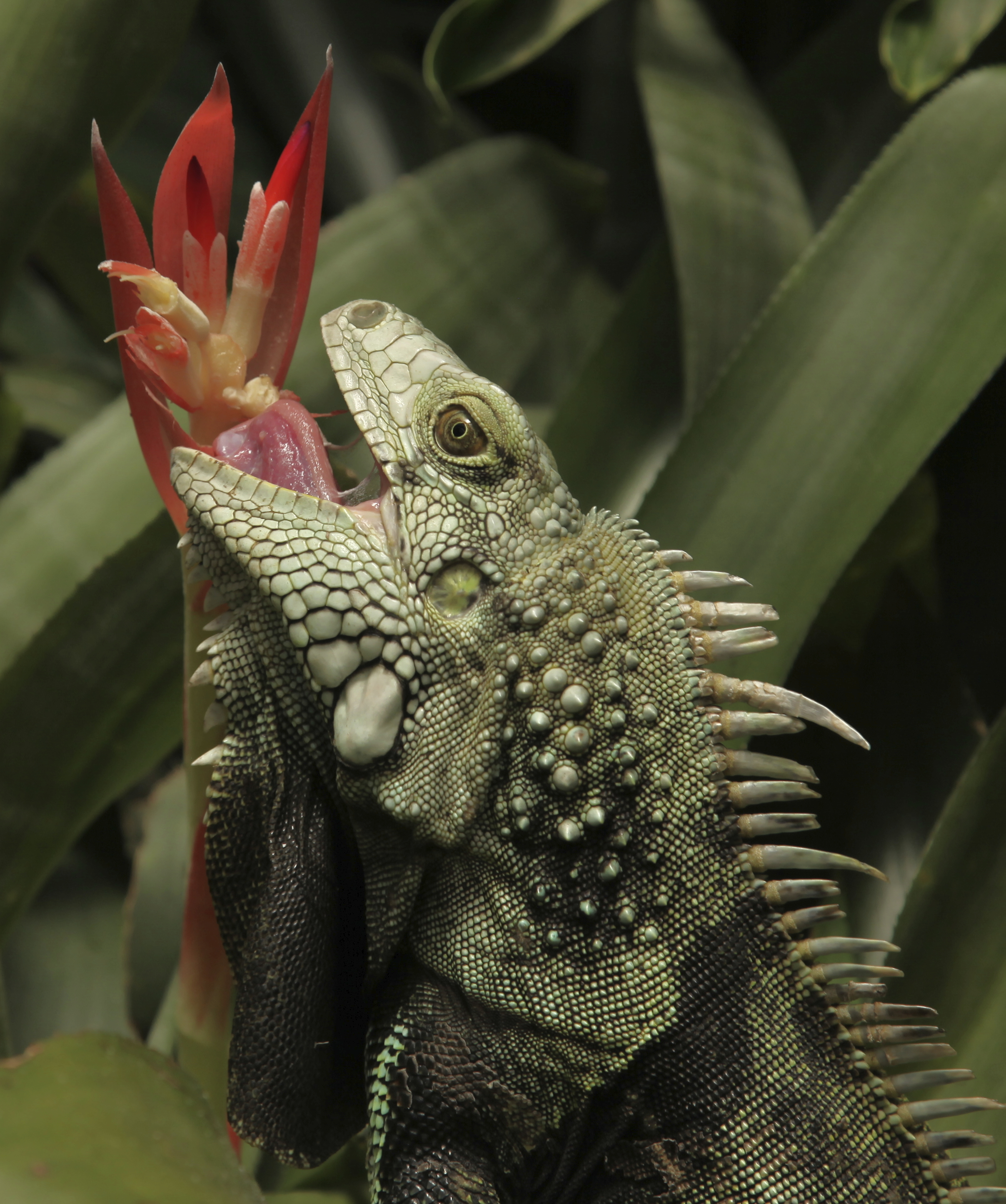
Iguana eating flower.

Iguanas have keen vision and can see shapes, shadows, colors, and movement at long distances. Their visual acuity enables them to navigate through crowded forests and to locate food. They employ visual signals to communicate with other members of the same species.

The tympanum, the iguana's eardrum, is located above the subtympanic shield (or "ear shield") behind each eye (though the Lesser Antillean iguana lacks this shield).

Iguanas are often hard to spot, as they tend to blend into their surroundings, and their coloration enables them to hide from larger predators.

Like most reptiles, an iguana has a three-chambered heart with two atria, one ventricle, and two aortae with a systemic circulation. The muscles of an iguana are very light in color due to the high proportion of fast-twitch, glycolytic muscle fibers (type A). These A fibers are not very vascularized and are low in myoglobin, giving them their pale look. This high density of A fibers allows iguanas to move very quickly for a short period of time, which facilitates short bursts of movement, but is inefficient for long duration movement, since cellular respiration in A fibers is anaerobic.

=== Parietal eye ===
Several species of lizards, including the iguanas, have a pale scale towards the back of their heads marking the parietal eye. This organ is sensitive to changes in illumination and sends signals to the pineal gland noting the change between day and night. A photopigment commonly found in the lamprey, known as parapinopsin, is also found in the iguana, and is sensitive to ultraviolet light and aids in the signaling between day and night.

=== Skull morphology and diet ===
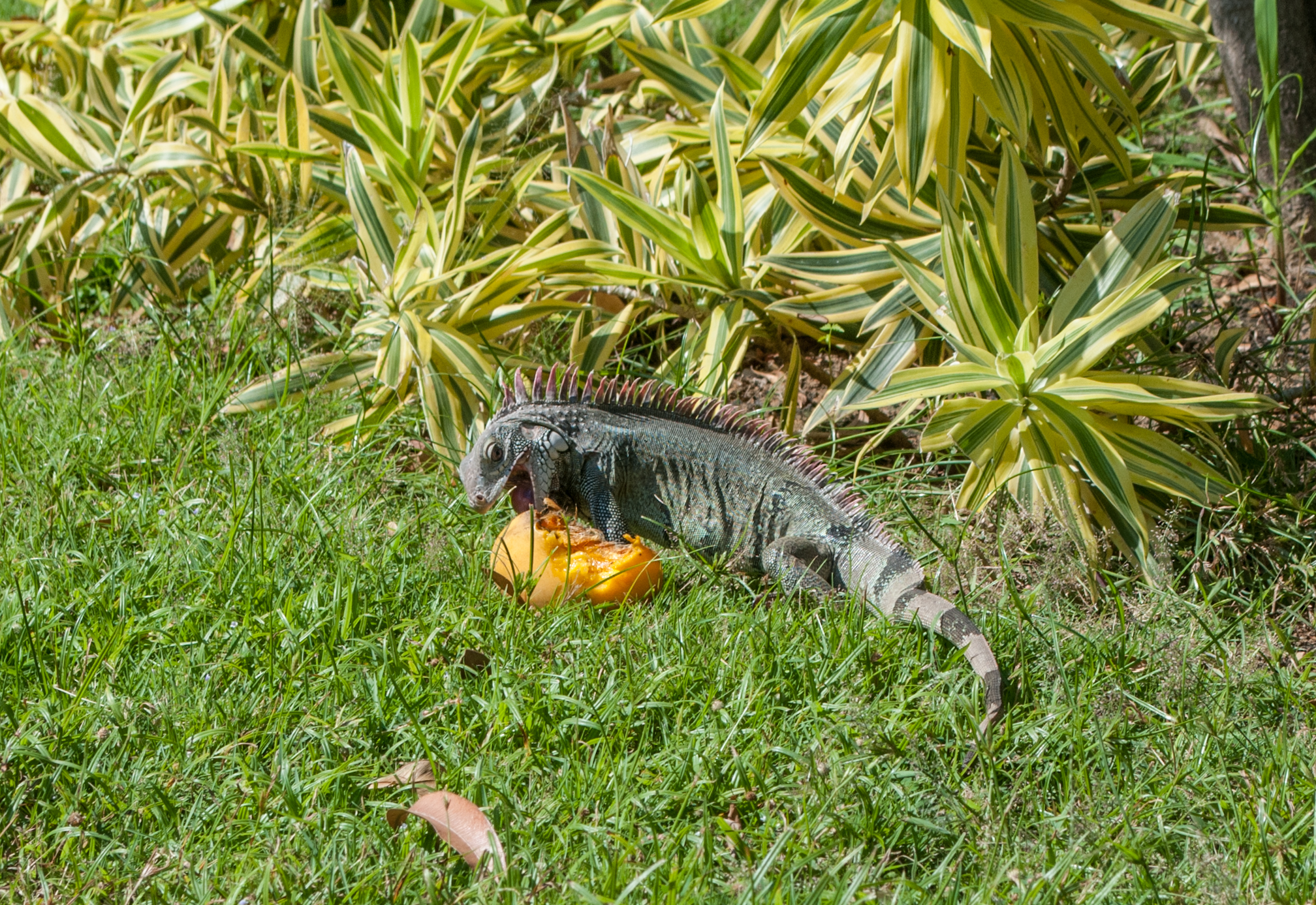
Iguanas have an exclusively herbivorous diet, as illustrated above by a green iguana eating a mango in Venezuela.

Iguanas have developed an herbivorous lifestyle, foraging exclusively on vegetation and foliage. To acquire, process, and digest plant matter, herbivorous lizards must have a higher bite force relative to their size in comparison to carnivorous or omnivorous reptiles. The skull of the iguana has undergone modifications resulting in a strong bite force and efficient processing of vegetation, according to one study. To accomplish this biomechanically, herbivorous lizards have taller and wider skulls, shorter snouts, and larger bodies relative to carnivorous and omnivorous reptiles. Increasing the strength of the skull allows for increased muscle presence and increases the ability of the skull to withstand stronger forces.

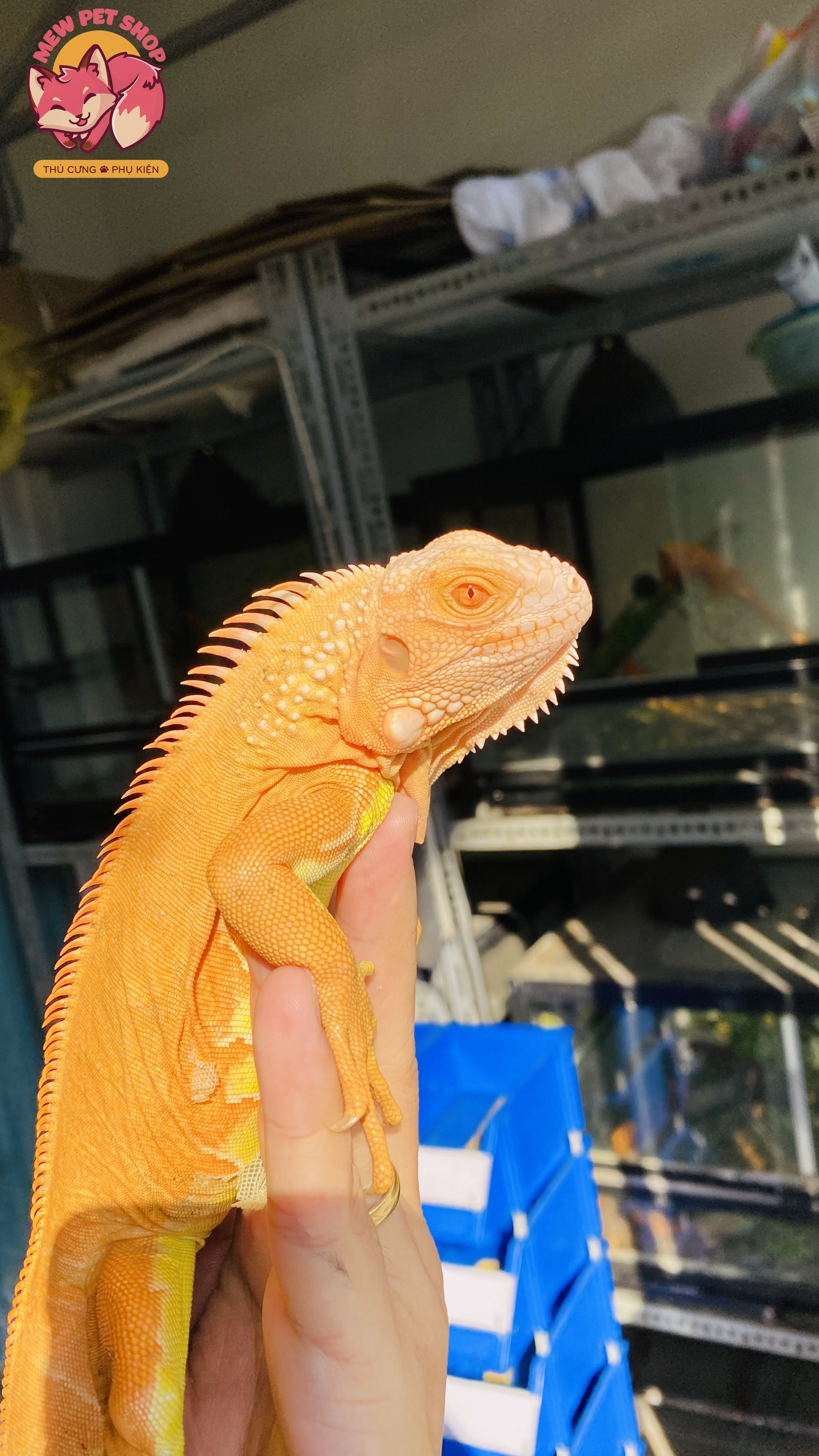
Albino Iguana - Bred to be kept as a pet

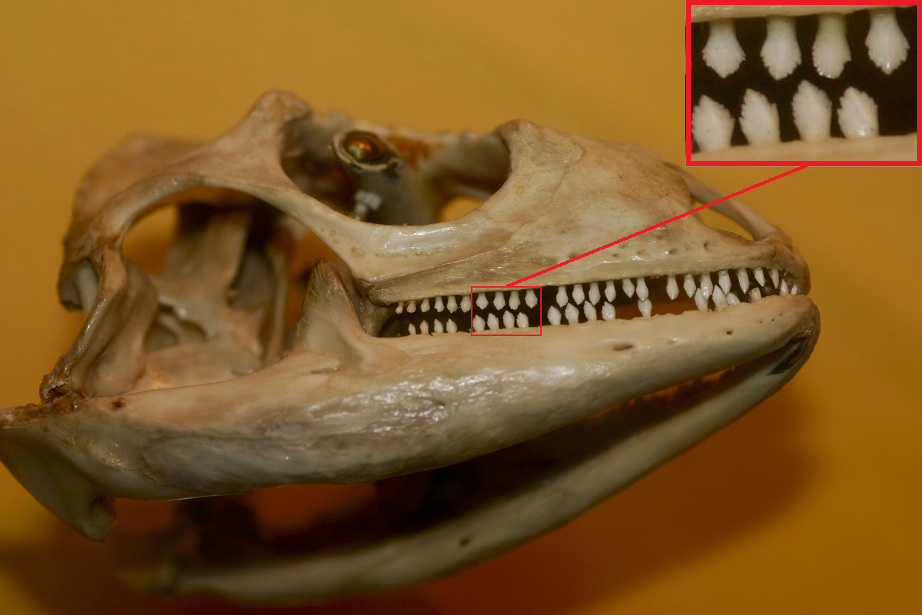
Green iguana skull and teeth: The teeth of the green iguana sit on the surface of the jawbone, known as acrodontal placement.

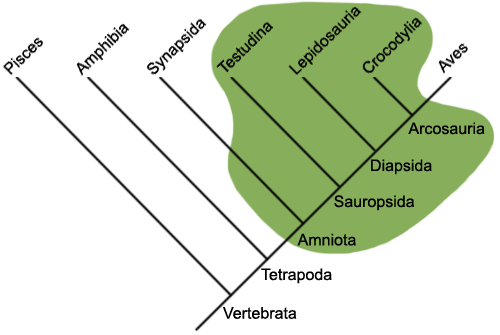
Simple phylogeny with Reptilia highlighted in green: Iguanians are within Lepidosauria.

Furthermore, the teeth of the iguana are acrodontal, meaning that their teeth sit on top of the surface of the jaw bone and project upwards. The teeth themselves are small and serrated - evolved to grasp and shear food.

=== Reproduction ===
Male iguanas, like other male examples of Squamata, have two hemipenes. During copulation, one hemipenis is inserted into the female's cloacal vent. A female can store sperm from previous mates for several years to continue to fertilize her eggs in case she finds no male within her territory when she is ready to lay again. The number of eggs (a clutch) that a female can lay is strongly dependent of her body size and impacted by climatic and environmental conditions. Clutch size within Iguana iguana has been recorded up to 71 eggs, whilst maximum clutch size for Iguana delicatissima is 30, with the only reported hybrid female between both species having 35 eggs. In some circumstances, an iguana is able to reproduce hatchlings without mating.

=== Mating/courtship ===
Iguanas tend to follow a promiscuous or polygynandrous mating style during the dry season. Mating during the dry season ensures that their offspring will hatch during the wet or rainy season when food will be more plentiful. Females control large territories, where they make several nests. Males compete for the females in an area and mark their won territory with a pheromone secreted from the femoral pores on the dorsal side of their hind limbs. Male behavior during sexual competition involves head bobbing, extending and retracting their dewlap, nuzzling and biting the necks of females, and on occasion, changing color. Once a female chooses a male, he straddles the female and holds her in place by biting onto her shoulder, which sometimes leaves scars on females. After copulation, eggs are laid within a nest underground (at depths up to 1.65 m (5.5 ft) for the Lesser Antillean iguana) from which the hatchlings emerge after >85 days of incubation. This low level of parental intervention with their offspring makes iguanas an example of r-strategy reproduction.

== Phylogeny ==
A phylogeny based on nuclear protein-coding genes, reviewed by Vidal and Hedges (2009), suggested that the subclade Iguania is in a group with snakes and anguimorphs (lizards). These groups share an oral gland capable of secreting toxins (a derived trait). The phylogeny based on whole mitochondrial genomes, though, as proposed by Rest et al. (2003), places the green iguana as the closest relative of the mole skink (Plestiodon egregius). Lepidosaurs are reptiles with overlapping scales, and within this group both iguanians and tuataras (Sphenodon) project their tongues to seize prey items instead of using their jaws, which is called tongue prehension. Iguanians are the only lineage within the Squamata that display this trait, meaning that it was gained independently in both iguanians and tuataras. Iguanians are also the only squamates that primarily use their sight to identify and track prey rather than chemoreception or scent, and employ an ambush technique of catching prey instead of active searching.

A study by Breuil et al. (2020) found the taxonomy of the genus Iguana as follows, with I. delicatissima being the most basal member of the group. The species are classified as subspecies based on the ReptileDatabase definitions.

- - Sauromalus
  - Iguana
    - I. delicatissima
    - I. iguana
      - "I. i. rhinolopha"
      - - - I. i. insularis
          - I. i. sanctaluciae
        - - I. i. melanoderma
          - I. i. iguana

The Reptile Database synonymizes I. rhinolopha with I. iguana, only considering it a distinctive population, and recognizes I. insularis and I. melanoderma as subspecies of I. iguana. Four subspecies of green iguana are recognized under this treatment: I. i. insularis (Saint Vincent & the Grenadines and Grenada), I. i. sanctaluciae (Saint Lucia), I. i. melanoderma (parts of the northern Lesser Antilles, and potentially coastal Venezuela, the Virgin Islands, and Puerto Rico), and I. i. iguana (mainland South America).

=== Extant species ===
Two extant species in the genus Iguana are widely recognized.

Image	Scientific name	Common name	Distribution
	Iguana delicatissima	Lesser Antillean iguana	The Lesser Antilles on Saint Barth, Anguilla, Sint Eustatius, Guadeloupe, Dominica, and Martinique. Historically inhabited all islands between Anguilla and Martinique, except Saba and Montserrat (and perhaps Redonda).
	Iguana iguana	Green iguana	Most of South America, from Colombia east to French Guiana and south to northern Argentina. Also introduced to parts of the Caribbean. If other species formerly considered conspecific are included, ranges north to southern Mexico and the southern Caribbean; specifically Grenada, Aruba, Bonaire, Curaçao, Trinidad and Tobago, St. Lucia, St. Vincent, Saba (island), Montserrat and Útila.

==== Subspecies ====
Three Caribbean subspecies of the green iguana are also recognized:

Image	Subspecies	Common name	Distribution
	I. i. insularis	Grenadines horned iguana	St. Vincent and the Grenadines and Grenada
	Iguana iguana melanoderma	Saban black iguana	Saba, Montserrat, and formerly Redonda, but also possibly coastal Venezuela, the Virgin Islands, and Puerto Rico. At least parts of this range may derive from historic introduction.
	I. i. sanctaluciae	Saint Lucia horned iguana	St. Lucia

The Central American iguana (I. rhinolopha or I. i. rhinolopha), sometimes considered a distinct species, is largely considered synonymous with I. iguana, as the presence of horns does not necessarily indicate a new species or subspecies. The two described subspecies of I. insularis (the Saint Lucia horned iguana, I. i. sanctaluciae, and the Grenadines horned iguana, I. i. insularis) were originally described as subspecies of I. iguana, although they are genetically very similar and may not be separate subspecies from one another. Recent studies have recovered I. rhinolopha and I. insularis as distinct species based on genetics, but the Reptile Database disagrees with these conclusions, and classifies I. rhinolopha as synonymous with I. iguana, and I. insularis as a subspecies of I. iguana. The Curaçao population of green iguanas shows major genetic divergence and may also represent an as-of-yet undescribed species or subspecies.

== As food ==
Iguanas have historically featured in the culinary traditions of Mexico and Central America. Iguana meat is also consumed in parts of the Dominican Republic and United States (such as Puerto Rico). Iguana eggs are consumed in some parts of Latin America, such as Nicaragua and Colombia.

== Ecology ==
As large herbivores, iguanas are important members of the ecosystems they live in, especially on islands where they often are the largest native terrestrial species. Given their life history characteristics their impact on other species is high. By eating leaves and flowers they promote plant growth and flowering, and by eating fruits and seeds they aid in seed dispersal and germination. The large number of eggs that female iguanas lay provides high amounts of protein for predators that either target the eggs while these are incubating, or that feed on baby iguanas once they emerge. Also, the nests that female iguanas dig (including the tunnels) create complex underground systems with looser soil that other species can utilize; a recent study found that females of the Lesser Antillean iguana can lay their clutches at a depth of 1.65 m (5.5 ft) underground.
