= List of Senna species =

As of July 2024, Plants of the World Online accepted the following species of Senna:

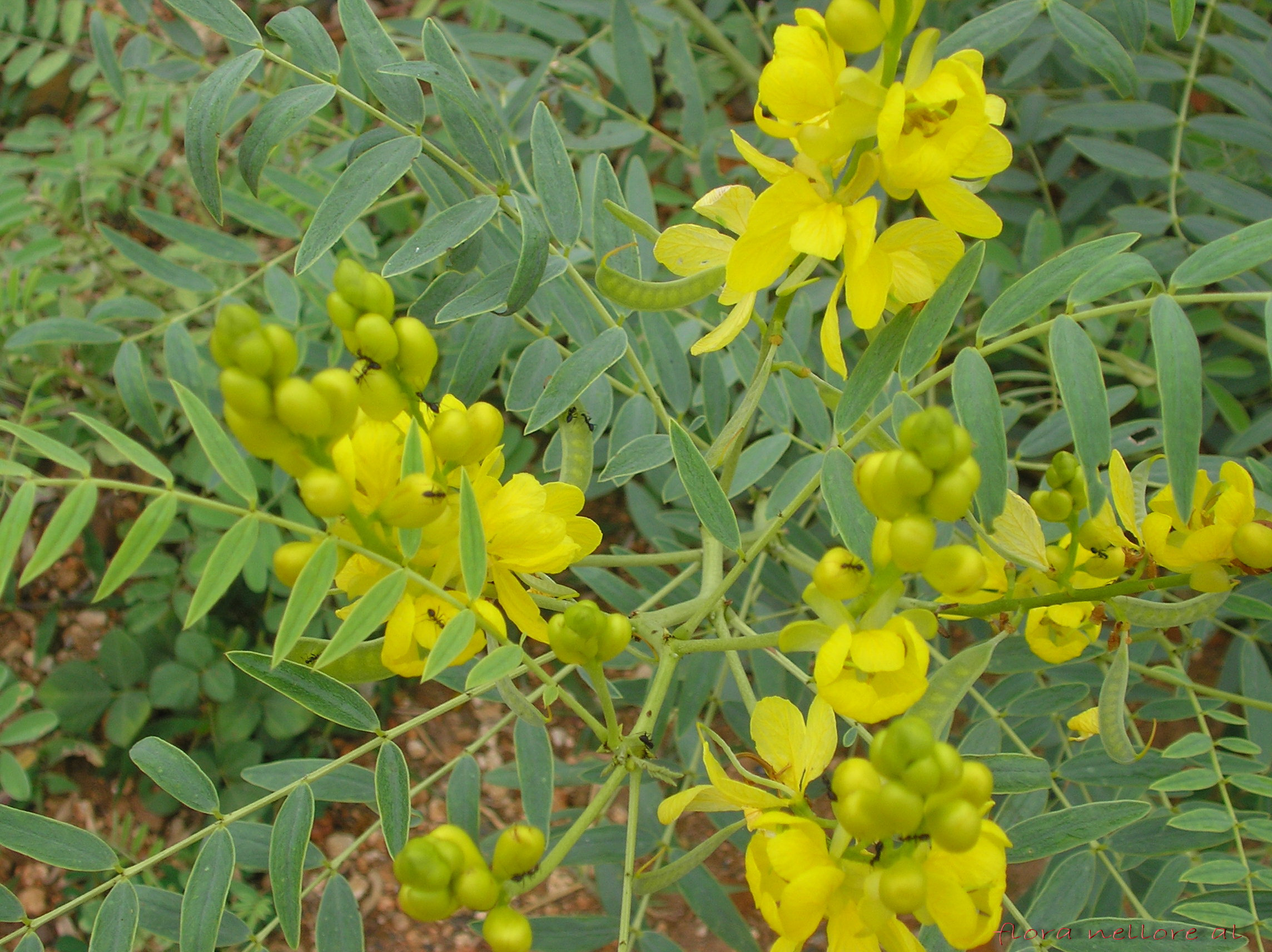
Senna alexandrina

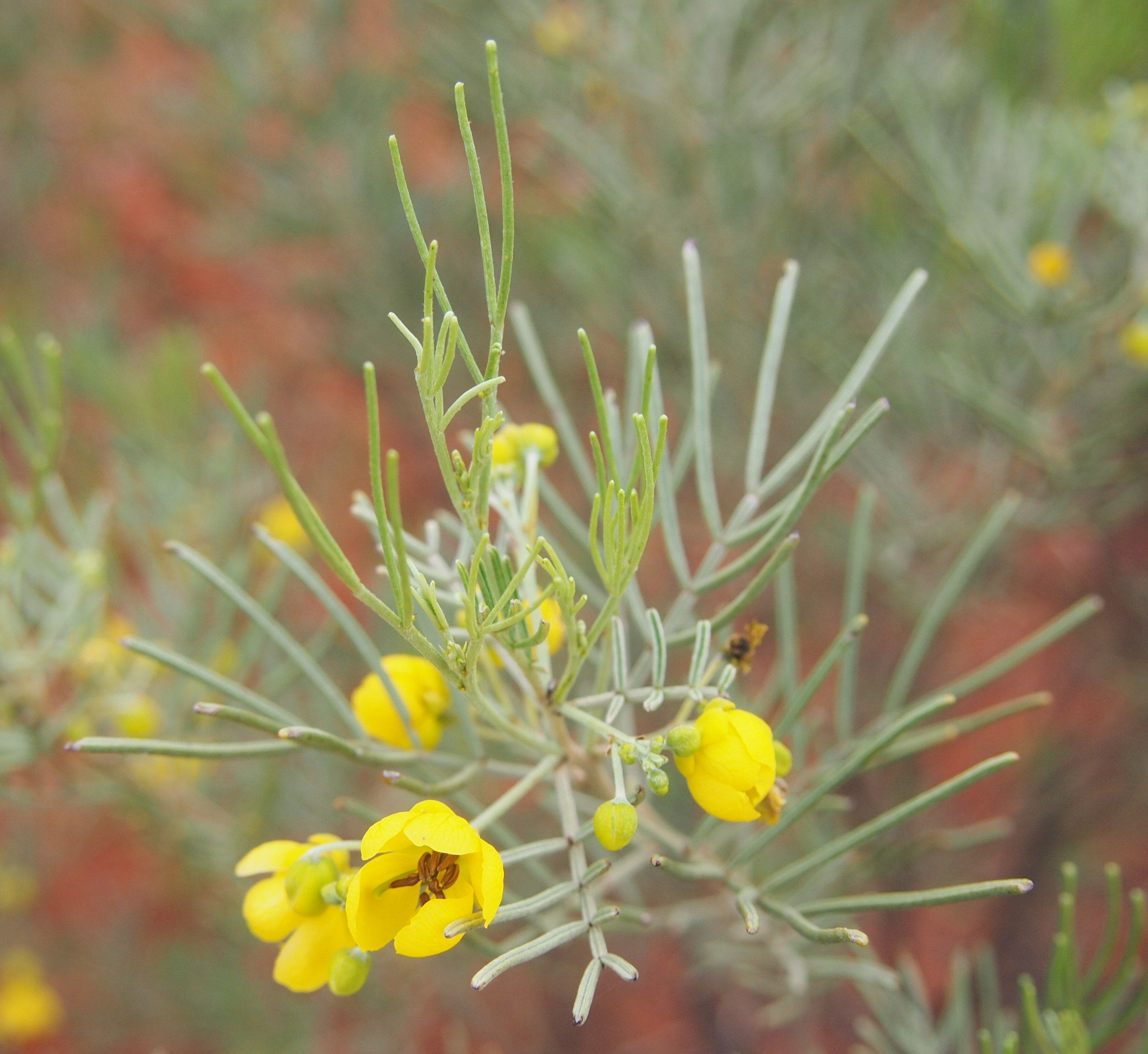
Senna artemisioides

Senna bicapsularis

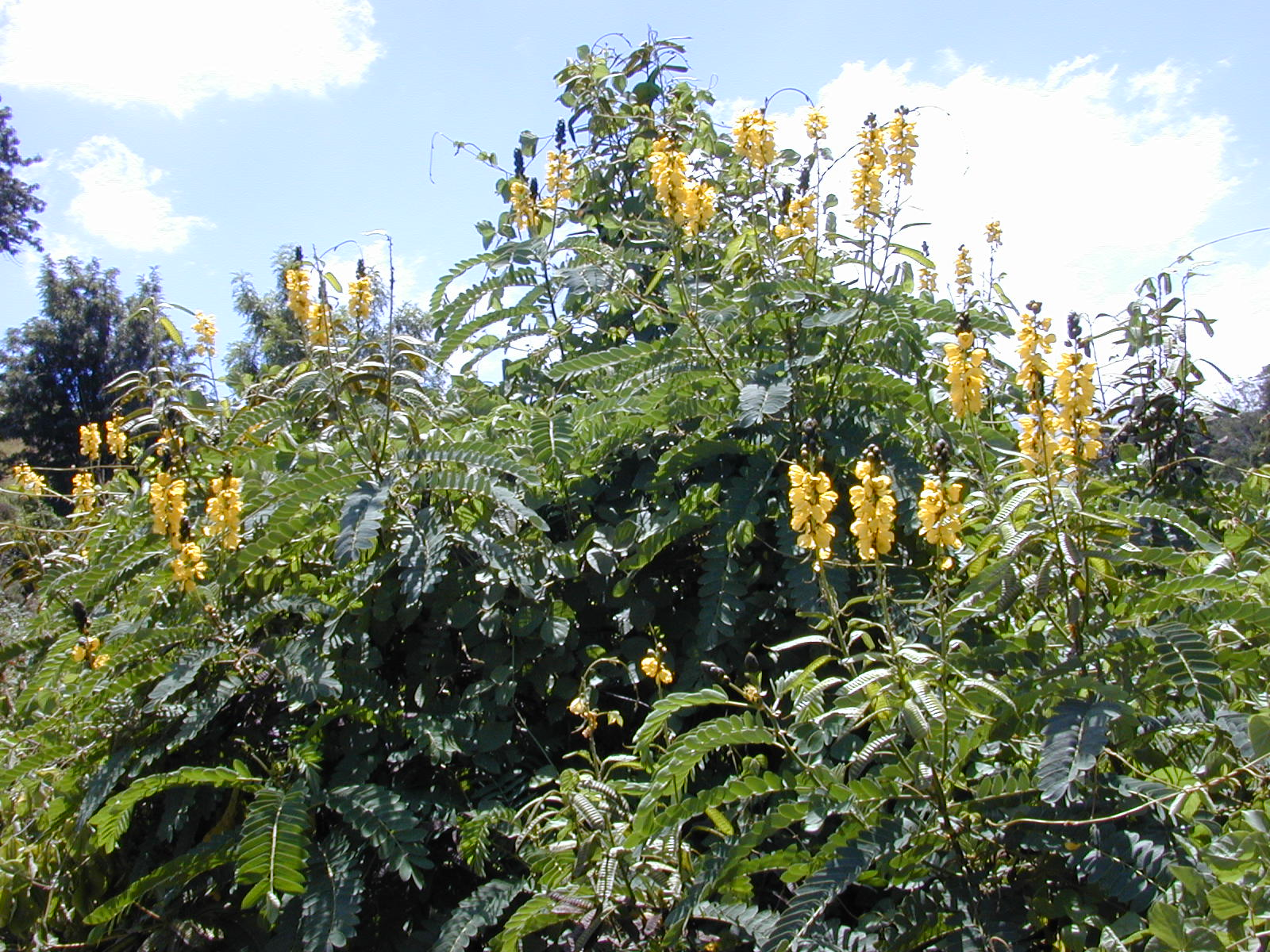
Senna didymobotrya

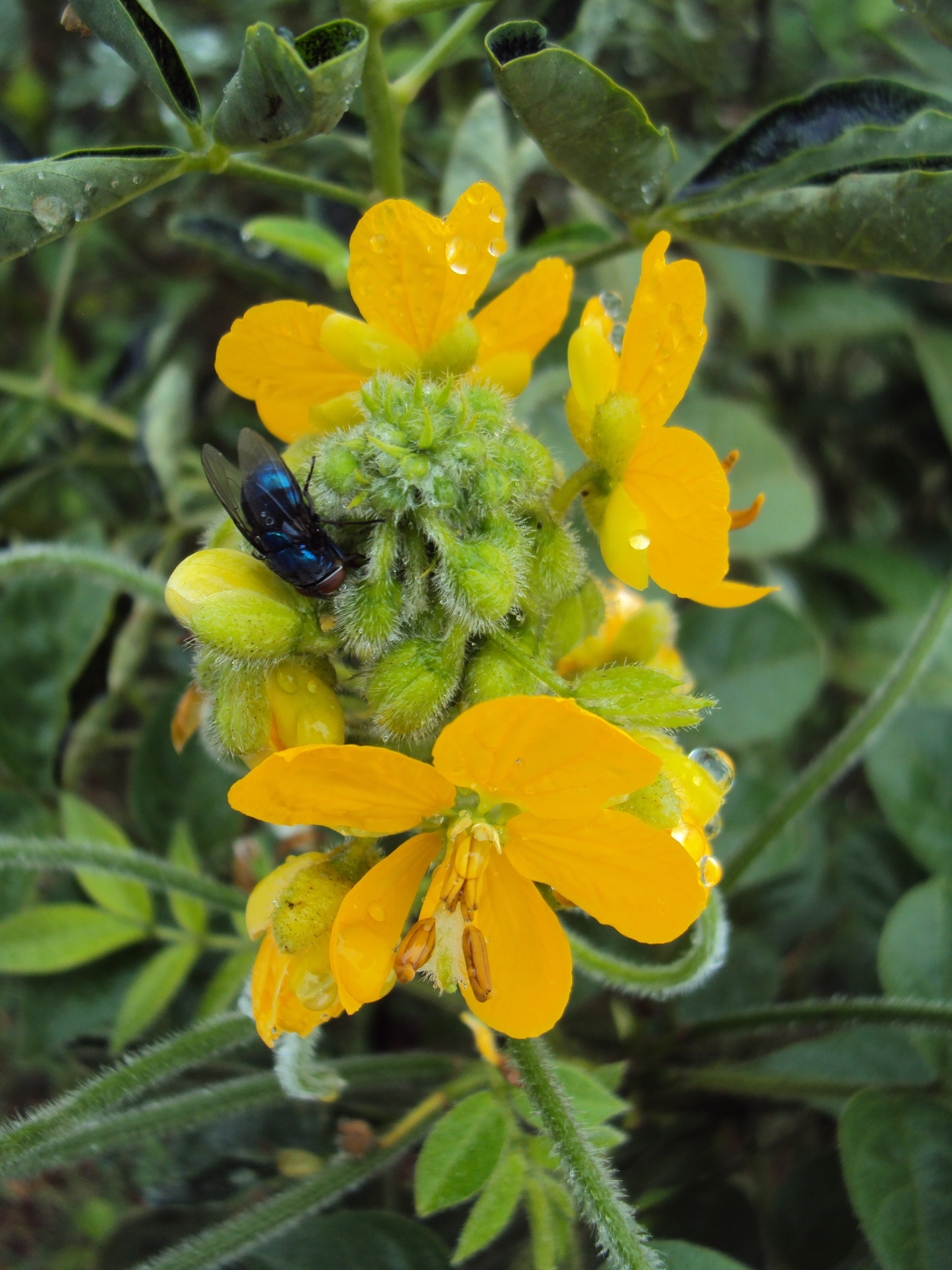
Senna hirsuta

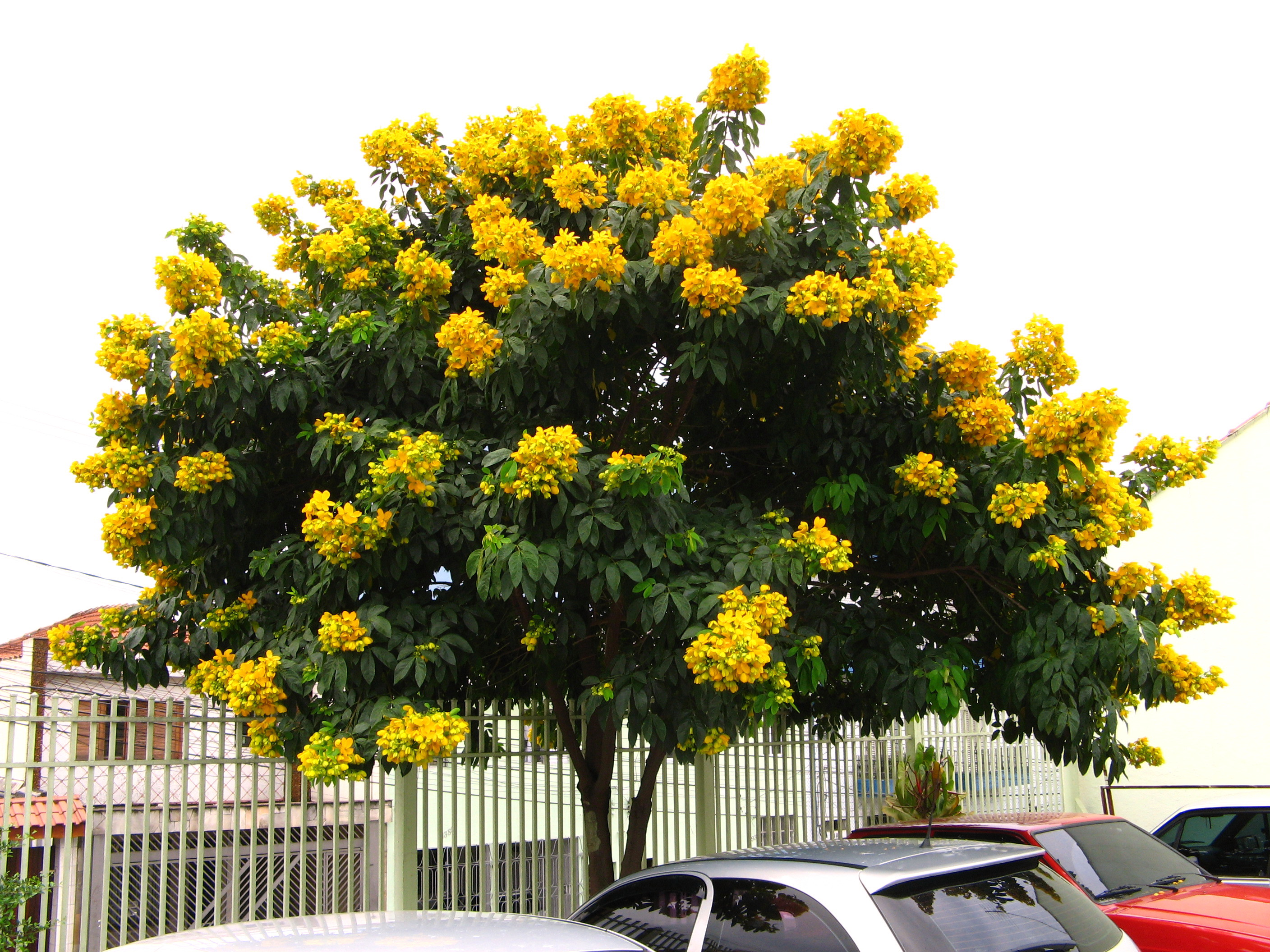
Senna macranthera

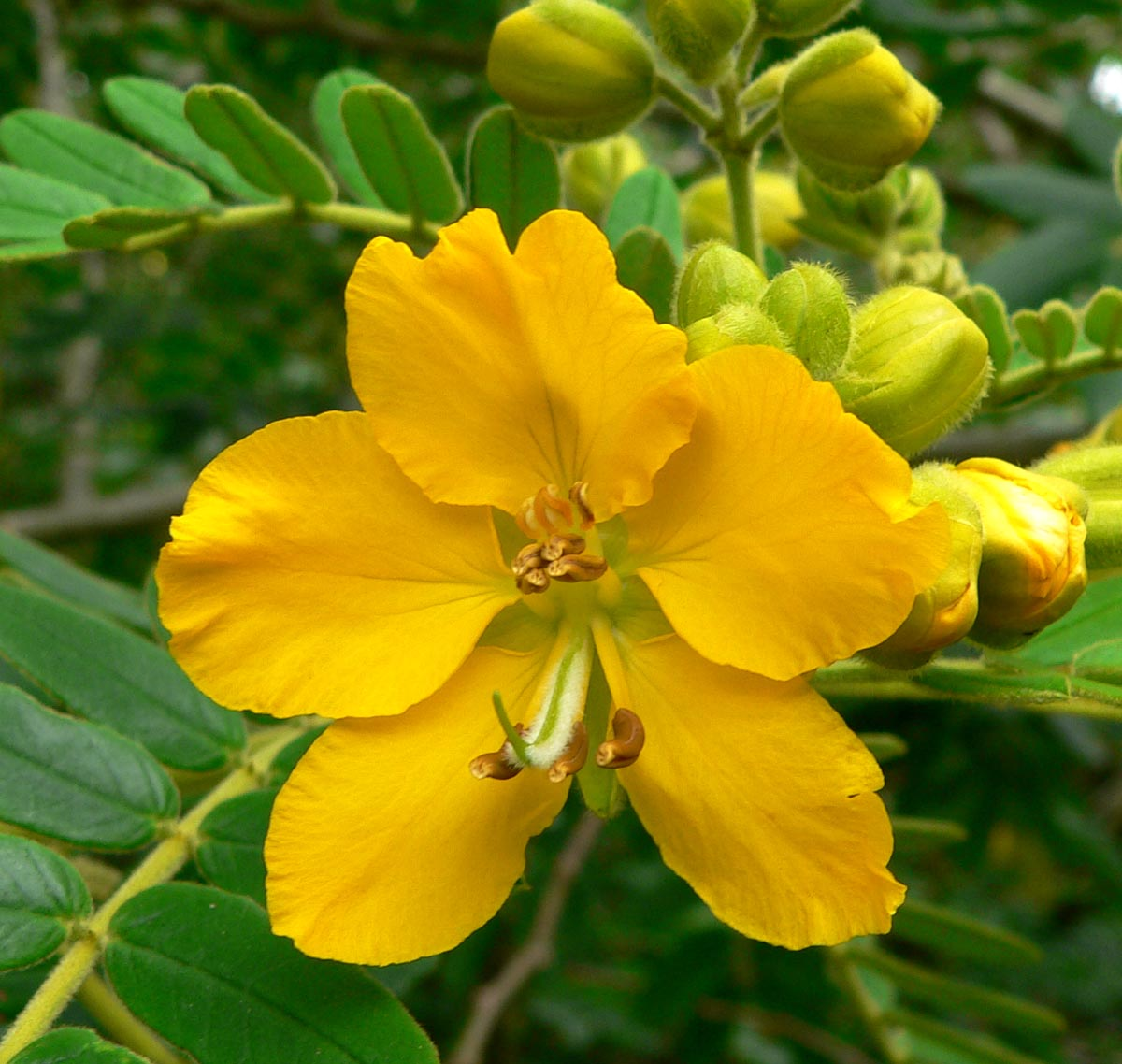
Senna multiglandulosa

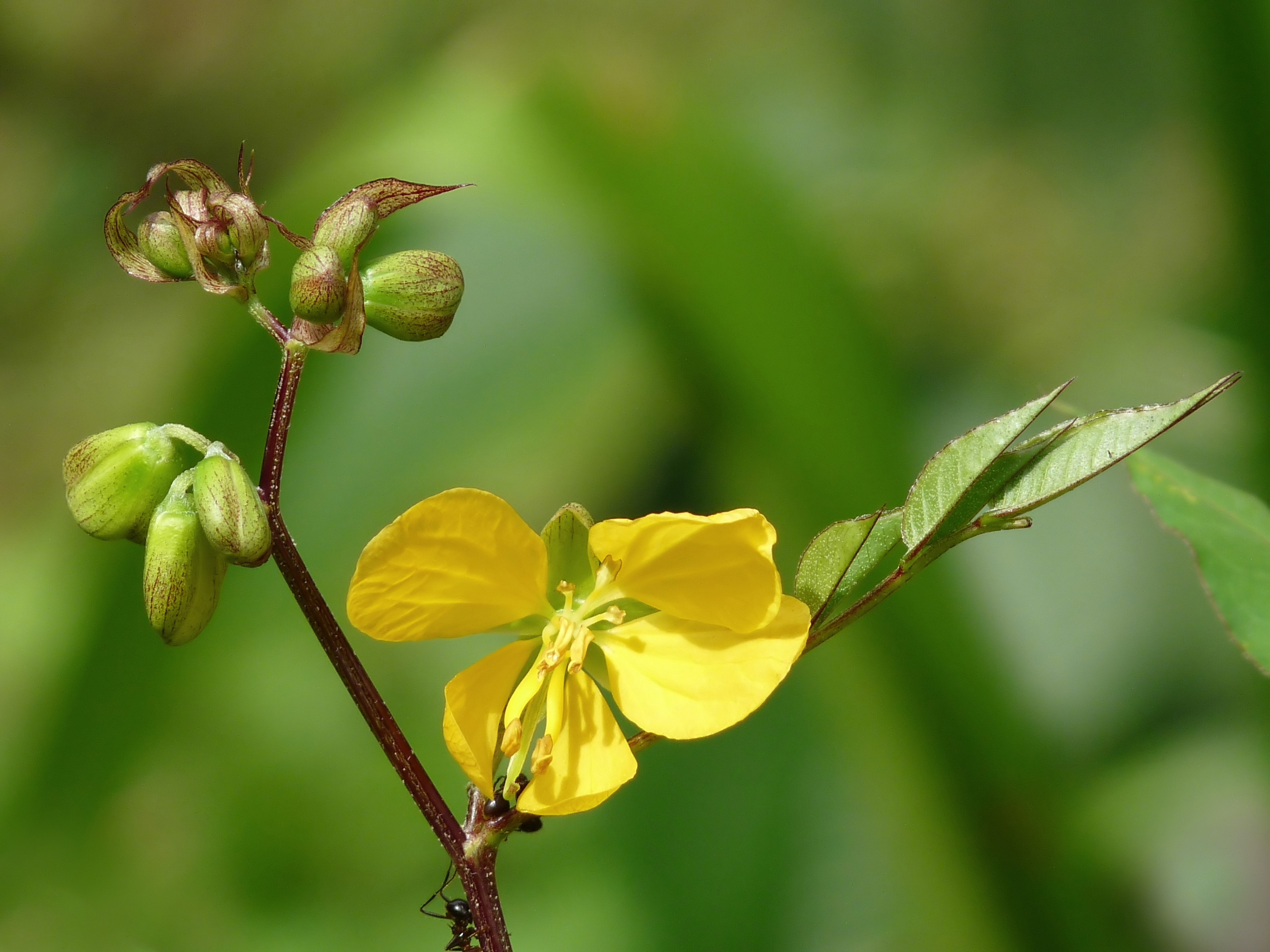
Senna occidentalis

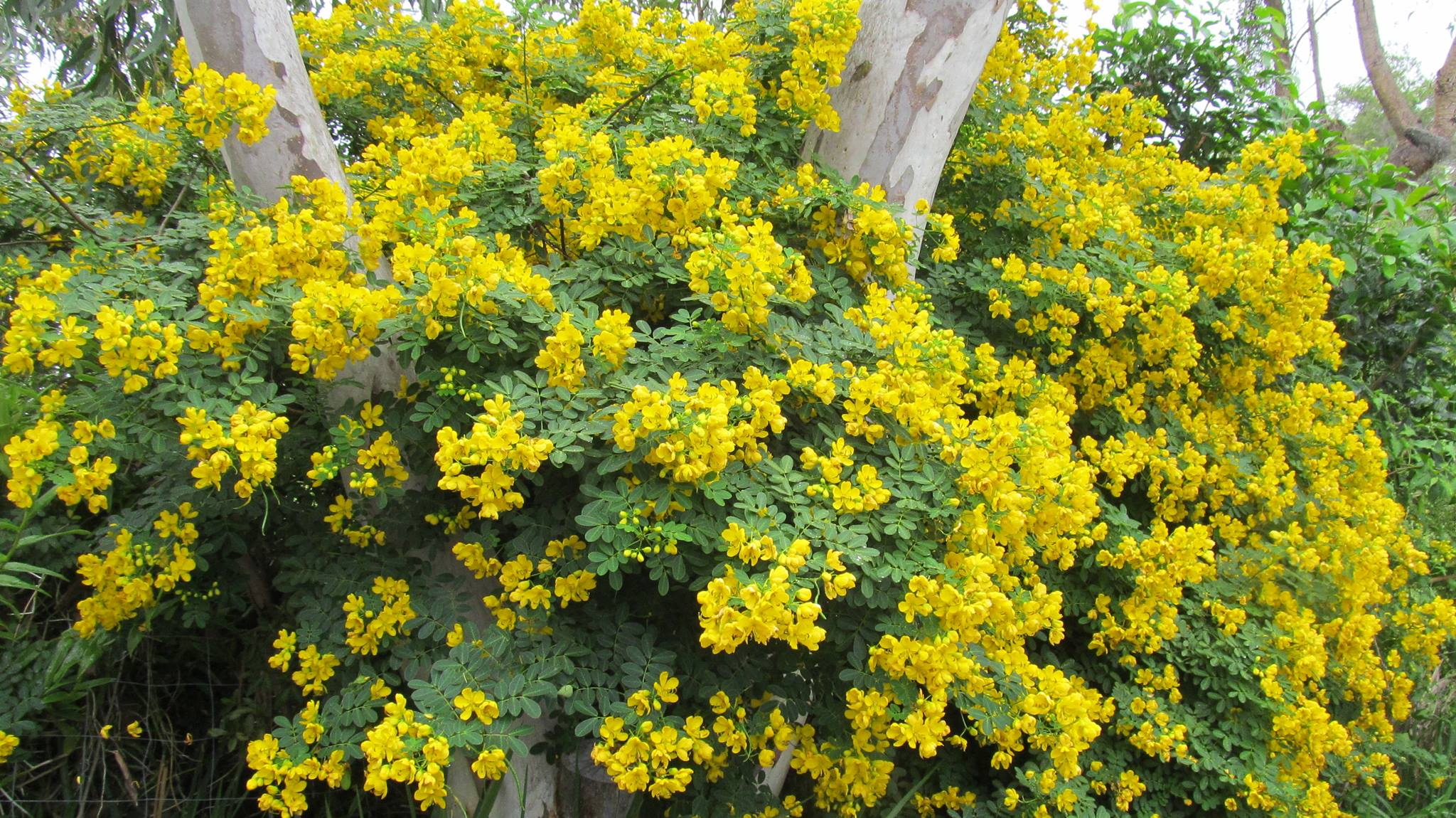
Senna pendula

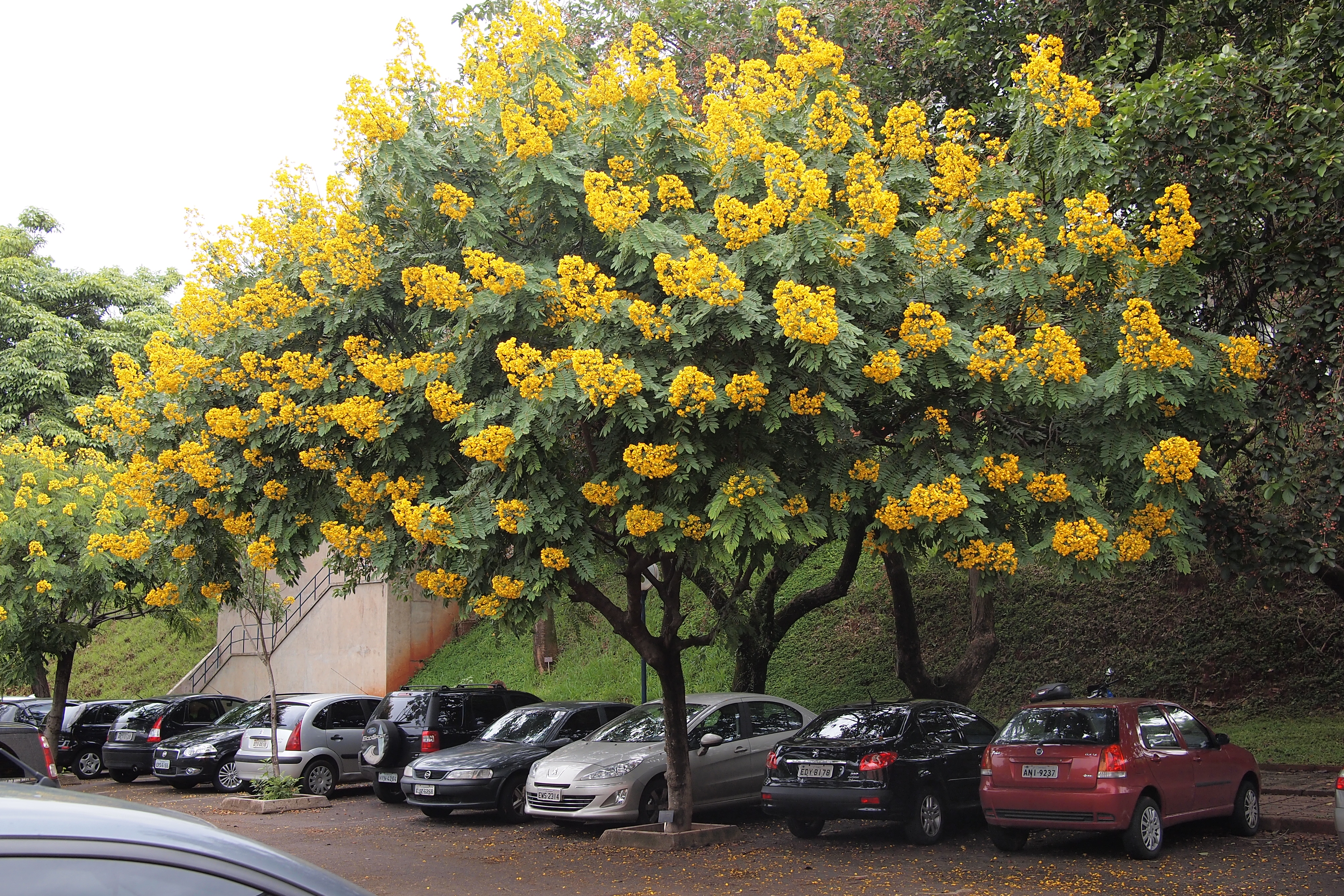
Senna spectabilis

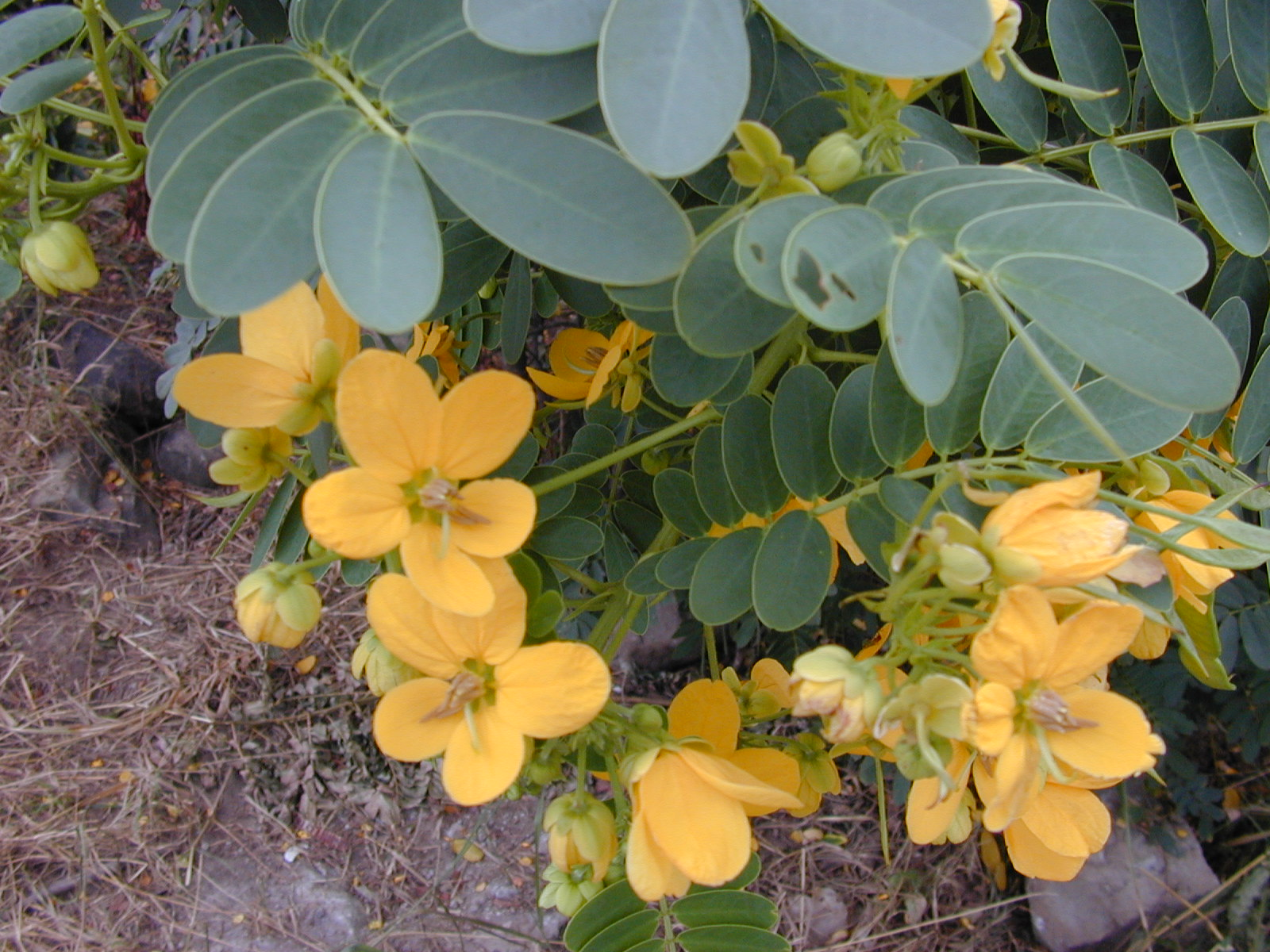
Senna surattensis

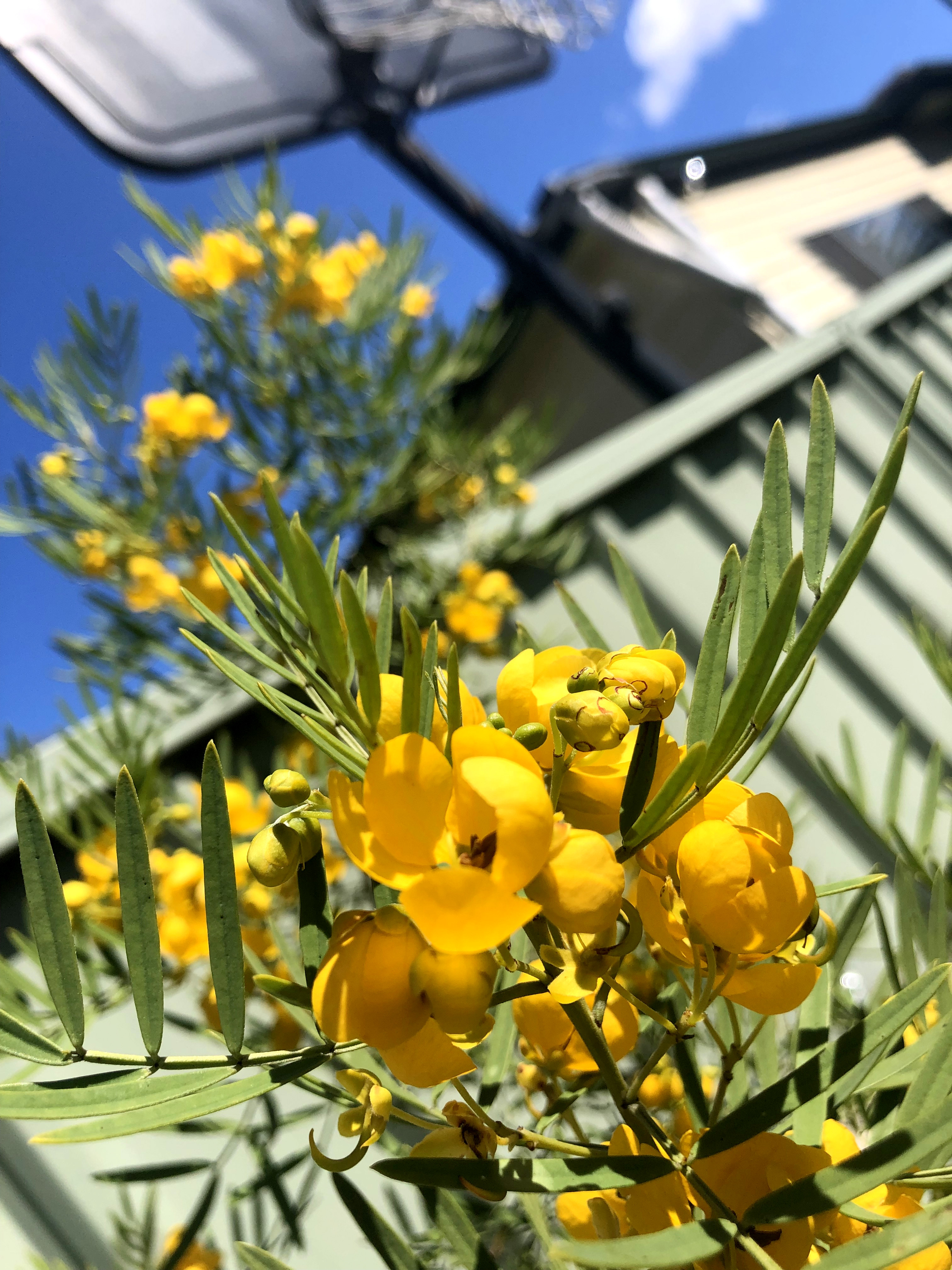
Senna odorata

== A ==
- Senna acanthoclada (Griseb.) H.S.Irwin & Barneby (Argentina)
- Senna acatlanensis C.Rojas-Mart. & A.Delgado (Mexico)
- Senna acclinis (F.Muell.) Randell – rainforest cassia, brush senna (New South Wales)
- Senna aciphylla (Benth. ex A.Gray) Randell – sprawling senna, Australian senna (eastern Australia)
- Senna aculeata (Pohl ex Benth.) H.S.Irwin & Barneby (South America)
- Senna acunae (Borhidi) A.Barreto & Yakovlev (Cuba)
- Senna acuparata H.S.Irwin & Barneby (Ecuador, Peru)
- Senna acuruensis (Benth.) H.S.Irwin & Barneby (Brazil)
- Senna acutisepala (Benth.) H.S.Irwin & Barneby (Brazil)
- Senna affinis (Benth.) H.S.Irwin & Barneby (Bolivia, Brazil)
- Senna alata (L.) Roxb. – candlebush, Christmas candle (South America, Central America)
- Senna alexandrina Mill. – Alexandrian senna (North Africa, India, Pakistan)
- Senna andrieuxii (Benth.) H.S.Irwin & Barneby (Mexico)
- Senna angulata (Vogel) H.S.Irwin & Barneby (Brazil)
- Senna angustisiliqua (Lam.) H.S.Irwin & Barneby (Caribbean Islands)
- Senna ankaranensis Du Puy & R.Rabev. (Madagascar)
- Senna anthoxantha (Capuron) Du Puy (Madagascar)
- Senna aphylla (Cav.) H.S.Irwin & Barneby (Argentina)
- Senna apiculata (M.Martens & Galeotti) H.S.Irwin & Barneby (Mexico, Argentina)
- Senna appendiculata (Vogel) Wiersema (Brazil)
- Senna apsidoneura (H.S.Irwin & Barneby) H.S.Irwin & Barneby (Bolivia)
- Senna araucarietorum H.S.Irwin & Barneby (Brazil)
- Senna argentea (Kunth) H.S.Irwin & Barneby (Mexico)
- Senna arida (Rose) H.S.Irwin & Barneby (Mexico)
- Senna aristeguietae H.S.Irwin & Barneby (Brazil, Venezuela)
- Senna armata (S.Watson) H.S.Irwin & Barneby (Arizona, California, Mexico Northwest, Nevada)
- Senna arnottiana (Gillies) H.S.Irwin & Barneby (Argentina, Chile)
- Senna artemisioides (Gaudich. ex DC.) Randell – silver cassia (Australia)
- Senna atomaria (L.) H.S.Irwin & Barneby (Mexico to Venezuela, Caribbean)
- Senna aurantia (Ruiz & Pav. ex G.Don) H.S.Irwin & Barneby (Peru)
- Senna auriculata (L.) Roxb. – avaram, Matara-tea, tanner's cassia (Indian subcontinent, Myanmar)
- Senna aversiflora (Herb.) H.S.Irwin & Barneby (Brazil)
- Senna aymara H.S.Irwin & Barneby (Bolivia)

== B ==
- Senna baccarinii (Chiov.) Lock
- Senna bacillaris (L.f.) H.S.Irwin & Barneby – West Indian showertree
- Senna bahiensis A.G.Lima & V.C.Souza
- Senna barclayana (Sweet) Randell – smooth senna, pepper-leaf senna (eastern Australia)
- Senna barnebyana Lass.
- Senna barronfieldii (Colla) Hewson – southern cassia (eastern Australia)
- Senna bauhinioides (A.Gray) H.S.Irwin & Barneby
- Senna benitoensis (Britton & P.Wilson) H.S.Irwin & Barneby
- Senna bicapsularis (L.) Roxb. – rambling senna, Christmas bush, money bush, yellow candlewood
- Senna biglandularis A.O.Araujo & V.C.Souza
- Senna birostris (Dombey ex Vogel) H.S.Irwin & Barneby
- Senna bosseri Du Puy & R.Rabev.
- Senna bracteosa D.B.O.S.Cardoso & L.P.Queiroz
- Senna brongniartii (Gaudich.) H.S.Irwin & Barneby
- Senna burkartiana (Villa) H.S.Irwin & Barneby

== C ==
- Senna cajamarcae H.S.Irwin & Barneby
- Senna cana (Nees & Mart.) H.S.Irwin & Barneby
- Senna candolleana (Vogel) H.S.Irwin & Barneby
- Senna cardiosperma (F.Muell.) Randell (western Australia)
- Senna catingae (Harms) L.P.Queiroz
- Senna caudata (Standl.) H.S.Irwin & Barneby
- Senna cearensis Afr.Fern.
- Senna centranthera H.S.Irwin & Barneby
- Senna cernua (Balb.) H.S.Irwin & Barneby
- Senna charlesiana (Symon) Randell (Western Australia)
- Senna chloroclada (Harms) H.S.Irwin & Barneby
- Senna chrysocarpa (Desv.) H.S.Irwin & Barneby
- Senna circinnata (Benth.) Randell – coiled senna (eastern Australia)
- Senna cladophylla (W.Fitzg.) Randell (northern Australia)
- Senna clavigera (Domin) Randell – pepper leaf senna (eastern Australia)
- Senna cobanensis (Britton) H.S.Irwin & Barneby
- Senna coimbrae M.Nee & Barneby
- Senna collicola H.S.Irwin & Barneby
- Senna confinis (Greene) H.S.Irwin & Barneby
- Senna corifolia (Benth.) H.S.Irwin & Barneby
- Senna cornigera H.S.Irwin & Barneby
- Senna coronilloides (Benth.) Randell – brigalow senna (eastern Australia)
- Senna corymbosa (Lam.) H.S.Irwin & Barneby – Argentine senna, Argentine wild sensitive plant
- Senna costata (J.F.Bailey & C.T.White) Randell (northern Australia)
- Senna covesii (A.Gray) H.S.Irwin & Barneby – Coues' cassia, Coves' cassia, desert senna
- Senna crassiramea (Benth.) H.S.Irwin & Barneby
- Senna crotalarioides (Kunth) H.S.Irwin & Barneby
- Senna cruckshanksii (Hook. & Arn.) H.S.Irwin & Barneby
- Senna cuatrecasasii H.S.Irwin & Barneby
- Senna cumingii (Hook. & Arn.) H.S.Irwin & Barneby
- Senna curvistyla (J.M.Black) Randell (north-western Australia)
- Senna cushina (J.F.Macbr.) H.S.Irwin & Barneby
- Senna cuthbertsonii (F.Muell.) Randell (northern Western Australia)

== D ==
- Senna dardanoi Afr.Fern. & P.Bezerra
- Senna dariensis (Britton & Rose) H.S.Irwin & Barneby
- Senna davidsonii (V.Singh) V.Singh
- Senna demissa (Rose) H.S.Irwin & Barneby
- Senna didymobotrya (Fresen.) H.S.Irwin & Barneby – candelabra-tree, peanut butter cassia, African senna
- Senna divaricata (Nees & Blume) Lock
- Senna divaricata (Nees & Blume) Lock
- Senna domingensis (Spreng.) H.S.Irwin & Barneby
- Senna dryadica A.G.Lima & Mansano
- Senna durangensis (Rose) H.S.Irwin & Barneby

== E ==
- Senna ellisiae (Brenan) Lock

== F ==
- Senna ferraria (Symon) Randell (north-western Western Australia)
- Senna flexuosa (Randell) Randell (Western Australia)
- Senna × floribunda (Cav.) H.S.Irwin & Barneby
- Senna foetidissima (Ruiz & Pav. ex G.Don) H.S.Irwin & Barneby
- Senna formosa H.S.Irwin & Barneby
- Senna franciscana A.G.Lima & Mansano
- Senna fruticosa (Mill.) H.S.Irwin & Barneby

== G ==
- Senna galeottiana (M.Martens) H.S.Irwin & Barneby
- Senna gardneri (Benth.) H.S.Irwin & Barneby
- Senna garrettiana (Craib) H.S.Irwin & Barneby
- Senna gaudichaudii (Hook. & Arn.) H.S.Irwin & Barneby – climbing cassia, heuhiuhi (Pacific Islands, Queensland)
- Senna georgica H.S.Irwin & Barneby
- Senna glaucifolia (Randell) Randell (north-western Australia)
- Senna gloriosa (H.S.Irwin & Barneby) A.G.Lima & Mansano
- Senna glutinosa (DC.) Randell (Australia)
- Senna goniodes (A.Cunn. ex Benth.) Randell (northern Western Australia)
- Senna gossweileri (Baker f.) Lock
- Senna guatemalensis (Donn.Sm.) H.S.Irwin & Barneby
- Senna gundlachii (Urb.) H.S.Irwin & Barneby

== H ==
- Senna hamersleyensis (Symon) Randell – creeping senna (northern Western Australia)
- Senna harleyi H.S.Irwin & Barneby
- Senna haughtii (J.F.Macbr.) H.S.Irwin & Barneby
- Senna hayesiana (Britton & Rose) H.S.Irwin & Barneby
- Senna hebecarpa (Fernald) H.S.Irwin & Barneby – American senna, wild senna
- Senna heptanthera Randell (Arnhem Land)
- Senna herzogii (Harms) H.S.Irwin & Barneby
- Senna hilariana (Benth.) H.S.Irwin & Barneby
- Senna hirsuta (L.) H.S.Irwin & Barneby – woolly senna (native to Americas, introduced elsewhere)
- Senna holosericea (Fresen.) Greuter
- Senna holwayana (Rose) H.S.Irwin & Barneby
- Senna hookeriana Batke
- Senna huancabambae (Harms) H.S.Irwin & Barneby
- Senna huidobriana (Phil.) Zoellner & San Martin
- Senna huilana (Britton & Rose) H.S.Irwin & Barneby
- Senna humifusa (Brenan) Lock

== I ==
- Senna incarnata (Pav. ex Benth.) H.S.Irwin & Barneby
- Senna insularis (Britton & Rose) H.S.Irwin & Barneby
- Senna intermedia (B.D.Sharma, Vivek. & Rathakr.) V.Singh
- Senna italica Mill. – Port Royal senna, dog senna, Italian senna, Spanish senna
- Senna itatiaiae H.S.Irwin & Barneby

== J ==
- Senna juchitanensis Saynes & R.Torres

== K ==
- Senna koelziana H.S.Irwin & Barneby
- Senna kuhlmannii Hoehne
- Senna kurtzii (Harms) H.S.Irwin & Barneby

== L ==
- Senna lactea (Vatke) Du Puy
- Senna lasseigniana H.S.Irwin & Barneby
- Senna latifolia (G.Mey.) H.S.Irwin & Barneby
- Senna leandrii (Ghesq.) Du Puy
- Senna lechriosperma H.S.Irwin & Barneby
- Senna leiophylla (Vogel) H.S.Irwin & Barneby
- Senna leptoclada (Benth.) Randell (Northern Territory)
- Senna ligustrina (L.) H.S.Irwin & Barneby – privet senna
- Senna lindheimeriana (Scheele) H.S.Irwin & Barneby – velvet-leaf senna, showy senna
- Senna longiglandulosa (Benth.) H.S.Irwin & Barneby
- Senna longiracemosa (Vatke) Lock
- Senna loretensis (Killip & J.F.Macbr.) H.S.Irwin & Barneby
- Senna lourteigiana H.S.Irwin & Barneby

== M ==
- Senna macranthera (DC. ex Collad.) H.S.Irwin & Barneby
- Senna macrophylla (Kunth) H.S.Irwin & Barneby
- Senna magnifolia (F.Muell.) Randell (Western Australia)
- Senna malaspinae H.S.Irwin & Barneby
- Senna mandonii (Benth.) H.S.Irwin & Barneby
- Senna manicula (Symon) Randell (Western Australia)
- Senna marilandica (L.) Link
- Senna martiana (Benth.) H.S.Irwin & Barneby
- Senna mensicola (H.S.Irwin & Barneby) H.S.Irwin & Barneby
- Senna meridionalis (R.Vig.) Du Puy – Madagascar senna
- Senna mexicana (Jacq.) H.S.Irwin & Barneby – Mexican senna
- Senna mollissima (Humb. & Bonpl. ex Willd.) H.S.Irwin & Barneby
- Senna monilifera H.S.Irwin & Barneby
- Senna monozyx (H.S.Irwin & Barneby) H.S.Irwin & Barneby
- Senna montana (B.Heyne ex Roth) V.Singh
- Senna morongii (Britton) H.S.Irwin & Barneby
- Senna mucronifera (Mart. ex Benth.) H.S.Irwin & Barneby
- Senna multifoliolata (Paul G.Wilson) H.S.Irwin & Barneby
- Senna multiglandulosa (Jacq.) H.S.Irwin & Barneby – glandular senna, downy senna (Central and Southern America, introduced elsewhere)
- Senna multijuga (Rich.) H.S.Irwin & Barneby – November shower, false sicklepod (Central and Southern America, introduced elsewhere)
- Senna mutisiana (Kunth) H.S.Irwin & Barneby

== N ==
- Senna nana (Benth.) H.S.Irwin & Barneby
- Senna neglecta (Vogel) H.S.Irwin & Barneby
- Senna nicaraguensis (Benth.) H.S.Irwin & Barneby
- Senna nitida (Rich.) H.S.Irwin & Barneby
- Senna notabilis (F.Muell.) Randell – cockroach bush (Australia)
- Senna nudicaulis (Burkart) H.S.Irwin & Barneby

== O ==
- Senna obliqua (G.Don) H.S.Irwin & Barneby (Peru)
- Senna oblongifolia (Vogel) H.S.Irwin & Barneby
- Senna obtusifolia (L.) H.S.Irwin & Barneby – coffee-weed, java-bean, American sicklepod (Central and Southern America, introduced elsewhere)
- Senna occidentalis (L.) Link – coffee senna, styptic weed, septicweed (U.S.A., Central and Southern America, introduced elsewhere)
- Senna oligoclada (F.Muell.) Randell (Northern Australia)
- Senna orcuttii (Britton & Rose) H.S.Irwin & Barneby – Orcutt's senna
- Senna organensis (Glaz. ex Harms) H.S.Irwin & Barneby
- Senna oxyphylla (Kunth) H.S.Irwin & Barneby

== P ==
- Senna pachyrrhiza (L.Bravo) H.S.Irwin & Barneby
- Senna pallida (Vahl) H.S.Irwin & Barneby
- Senna papillosa (Britton & Rose) H.S.Irwin & Barneby
- Senna paposana (Phil.) Zoellner & San Martin
- Senna paradictyon (Vogel) H.S.Irwin & Barneby
- Senna paraensis (Ducke) H.S.Irwin & Barneby
- Senna pendula (Humb. & Bonpl. ex Willd.) H.S.Irwin & Barneby – Easter cassia
- Senna pentagonia (Mill.) H.S.Irwin & Barneby
- Senna peralteana (Kunth) H.S.Irwin & Barneby
- Senna perrieri (R.Vig.) Du Puy
- Senna petersiana (Bolle) Lock
- Senna phlebadenia H.S.Irwin & Barneby
- Senna phyllodinea (R.Br.) Symon (arid areas of Australia)
- Senna pilifera (Vogel) H.S.Irwin & Barneby
- Senna pilocarina (Symon) Randell (Western Australia)
- Senna pilosior (B.L.Rob.) H.S.Irwin & Barneby — Trans-Pecos senna
- Senna pinheiroi H.S.Irwin & Barneby
- Senna pistaciifolia (Kunth) H.S.Irwin & Barneby
- Senna planitiicola (Domin) Randell
- Senna pleurocarpa (F.Muell.) Randell – stripe-pod cassia
- Senna pluribracteata F.S.Souto & R.T.Queiroz
- Senna pneumatica H.S.Irwin & Barneby
- Senna podocarpa (Guill. & Perr.) Lock
- Senna polyantha (Collad.) H.S.Irwin & Barneby
- Senna polyphylla (Jacq.) H.S.Irwin & Barneby
- Senna praeterita H.S.Irwin & Barneby
- Senna procumbens Randell
- Senna pumilio (A.Gray) H.S.Irwin & Barneby – dwarf senna
- Senna punoensis Lass.
- Senna purpusii (Brandegee) H.S.Irwin & Barneby

== Q ==
- Senna quinquangulata (Rich.) H.S.Irwin & Barneby

== R ==
- Senna racemosa (Mill.) H.S.Irwin & Barneby – limestone senna
- Senna reniformis (G.Don) H.S.Irwin & Barneby
- Senna reticulata (Willd.) H.S.Irwin & Barneby
- Senna rigidicaulis (Burkart ex L.Bravo) H.S.Irwin & Barneby
- Senna ripleyana (H.S.Irwin & Barneby) H.S.Irwin & Barneby – Ripley's senna
- Senna rizzinii H.S.Irwin & Barneby
- Senna robiniifolia (Benth.) H.S.Irwin & Barneby
- Senna roemeriana (Scheele) H.S.Irwin & Barneby – twoleaf senna, Roemer senna
- Senna rostrata (Mart.) H.S.Irwin & Barneby – New Mexico wild sensitive plant
- Senna rugosa (G.Don) H.S.Irwin & Barneby
- Senna ruiziana (G.Don) H.S.Irwin & Barneby
- Senna rupununiensis H.S.Irwin & Barneby
- Senna ruspolii (Chiov.) Lock

== S ==
- Senna saeri (Pittier) H.S.Irwin & Barneby
- Senna sandwithiana H.S.Irwin & Barneby
- Senna santanderensis (Britton & Killip) H.S.Irwin & Barneby
- Senna scabriuscula (Vogel) H.S.Irwin & Barneby
- Senna scandens (Ruiz & Pav. ex G.Don) H.S.Irwin & Barneby
- Senna septemtrionalis (Viv.) H.S.Irwin & Barneby – arsenic-bush, dooleyweed, laburnum, smooth senna
- Senna sericea (Symon) Albr. & Symon
- Senna siamea (Lam.) H.S.Irwin & Barneby – kassodtree, Siamese cassia, Thai cassia, Thailand shower
- Senna silvestris (Vell.) H.S.Irwin & Barneby
- Senna singueana (Delile) Lock
- Senna skinneri (Benth.) H.S.Irwin & Barneby
- Senna smithiana (Britton & Rose) H.S.Irwin & Barneby
- Senna sophera (L.) Roxb.
- Senna sousana H.S.Irwin & Barneby
- Senna spectabilis (DC.) H.S.Irwin & Barneby
- Senna spinescens (Hoffmanns. ex Vogel) H.S.Irwin & Barneby
- Senna spiniflora (Burkart) H.S.Irwin & Barneby
- Senna spinigera (Rizzini) H.S.Irwin & Barneby
- Senna splendida (Vogel) H.S.Irwin & Barneby
- Senna stenophylla (Britton) H.S.Irwin & Barneby
- Senna stipulacea (W.T.Aiton) H.S.Irwin & Barneby
- Senna stowardii (S.Moore) Randell (W.A.)
- Senna stricta (Randell) Randell (W.A., N.T.)
- Senna suarezensis (Capuron) Du Puy
- Senna subtrijuga H.S.Irwin & Barneby
- Senna subulata (Griseb.) H.S.Irwin & Barneby
- Senna sulfurea (DC. ex Collad.) H.S.Irwin & Barneby
- Senna surattensis (Burm.f.) H.S.Irwin & Barneby
- Senna symonii (Randell) Randell

== T ==
- Senna talpana H.S.Irwin & Barneby
- Senna tapajozensis (Ducke) H.S.Irwin & Barneby
- Senna tenuifolia (Vogel) H.S.Irwin & Barneby
- Senna timoriensis (DC.) H.S.Irwin & Barneby
- Senna tocotana (Rose ex Britton & Killip) Silverst.
- Senna tonduzii (Standl.) H.S.Irwin & Barneby
- Senna tora (L.) Roxb. – sickle senna, foetid cassia
- Senna trachypus (Mart. ex Benth.) H.S.Irwin & Barneby
- Senna trianae H.S.Irwin & Barneby
- Senna trolliiflora H.S.Irwin & Barneby
- Senna tropica (Vell.) H.S.Irwin & Barneby
- Senna truncata (Brenan) Lock
- Senna tuhovalyana (Aké Assi) Lock

== U ==
- Senna uncata H.S.Irwin & Barneby
- Senna undulata (Benth.) H.S.Irwin & Barneby
- Senna uniflora (Mill.) H.S.Irwin & Barneby
- Senna unijuga (Rose) H.S.Irwin & Barneby
- Senna urmenetae (Phil.) H.S.Irwin & Barneby

== V ==
- Senna vargasii (Schery) H.S.Irwin & Barneby
- Senna velutina (Vogel) H.S.Irwin & Barneby
- Senna venusta (F.Muell.) Randell – graceful senna (W.A., N.T., Qld.)
- Senna versicolor (Meyen ex Vogel) H.S.Irwin & Barneby
- Senna viarum (Little) H.S.Irwin & Barneby
- Senna viciifolia (Benth.) H.S.Irwin & Barneby
- Senna viguierella (Ghesq.) Du Puy
- Senna villosa (Mill.) H.S.Irwin & Barneby
- Senna viminea (L.) H.S.Irwin & Barneby

== W ==
- Senna weddelliana H.S.Irwin & Barneby
- Senna williamsii (Britton & Rose) H.S.Irwin & Barneby
- Senna wislizeni (A.Gray) H.S.Irwin & Barneby
- Senna wurdackii H.S.Irwin & Barneby – Wislizenus' senna, shrubby senna
