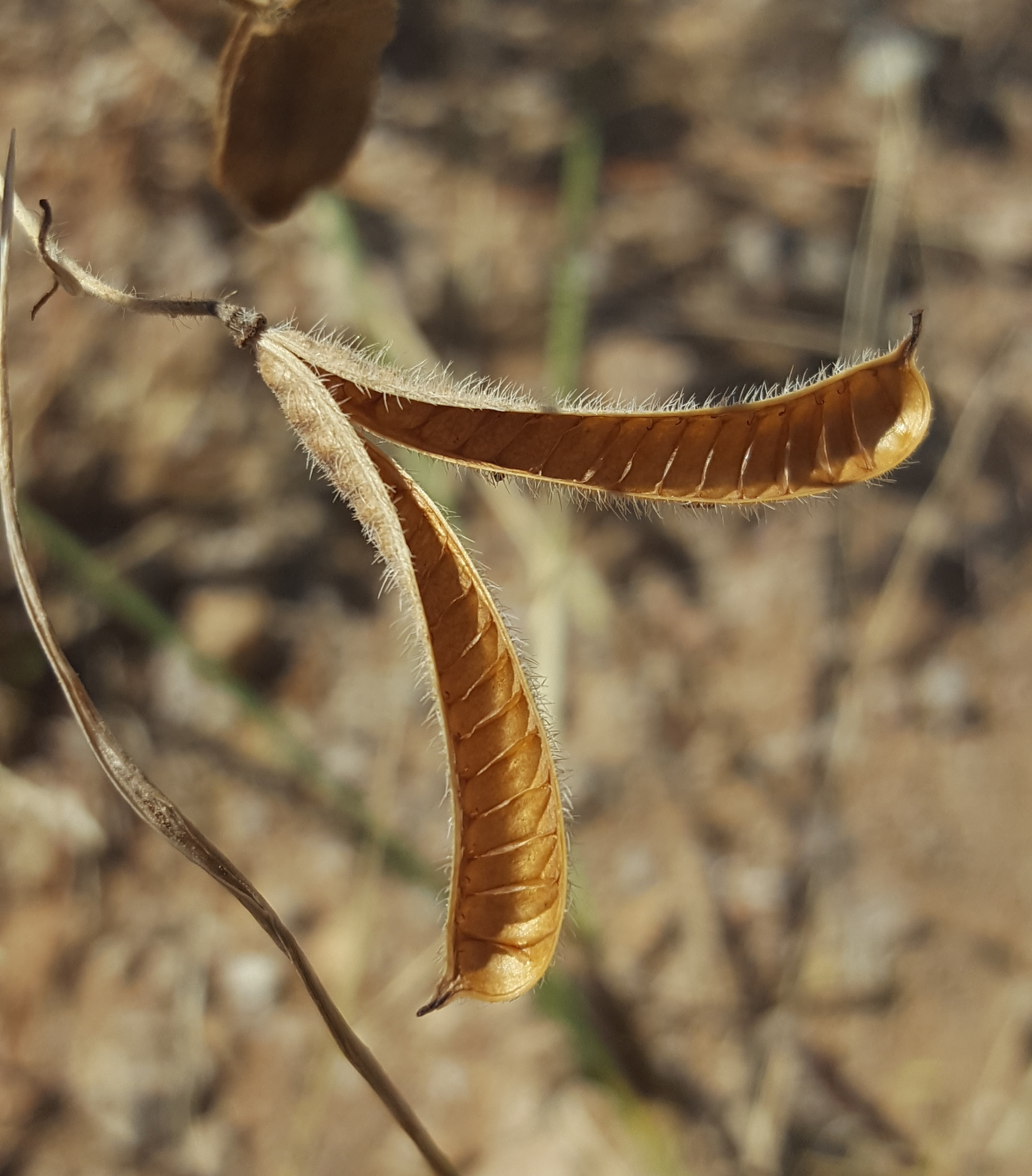

Scientific classification
- Kingdom: Plantae
- Clade: Tracheophytes
- Clade: Angiosperms
- Clade: Eudicots
- Clade: Rosids
- Order: Fabales
- Family: Fabaceae
- Subfamily: Caesalpinioideae
- Genus: Senna
- Species: S. bauhinioides

Binomial name
- Senna bauhinioides (A.Gray) H.S.Irwin & Barneby

Synonyms
- Cassia bauhinioides A.Gray; Cassia bauhinioides var. arizonica B.L.Rob.; Earleocassia bauhinioides (A.Gray) Britton

= Senna bauhinioides =

Species of plant

Senna bauhinioides, the twinleaf senna, is a species of flowering plant in the family Fabaceae. It is native to the US states of Arizona, New Mexico, and Texas, and to northern Mexico, and it has been introduced to the US state of Maryland. An opportunistic species, it is unpalatable to livestock, so its presence is considered an indicator of overgrazing.
