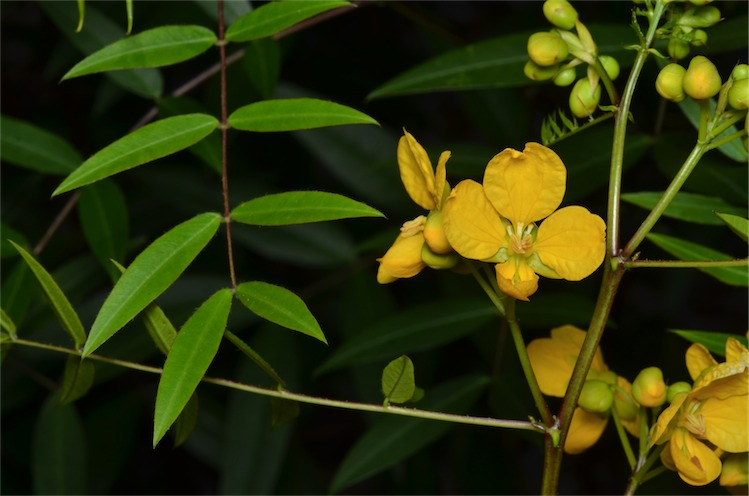
- In Mount Annan Botanic Garden

Scientific classification
- Kingdom: Plantae
- Clade: Tracheophytes
- Clade: Angiosperms
- Clade: Eudicots
- Clade: Rosids
- Order: Fabales
- Family: Fabaceae
- Subfamily: Caesalpinioideae
- Genus: Senna
- Species: S. clavigera

Binomial name
- Senna clavigera (Domin) Randell

Synonyms
- Cassia barclayana var. pubescens (Benth.) Symon; Cassia sophera var. clavigera Domin; Cassia sophera var. pubescens Benth.; Cassia barclayana var. barclayana auct. non Sweet: Symon, D.E.

= Senna clavigera =

Pepper leaf senna

Species of legume

Senna clavigera, commonly known as pepper leaf senna, is a species of flowering plant in the family Fabaceae and is endemic to eastern Australia. It is a perennial herb with pinnate leaves with four to seven pairs of lance-shaped to elliptic leaflets, and groups of four to twenty yellow flowers in upper leaf axils.

== Description ==
Senna clavigera is a perennial herb that typically grows to a height of up to 1.5 m (4 ft 11 in), and is more or less glabrous. Its leaves are pinnate, 100–120 mm (3.9–4.7 in) long with four to seven pairs of lance-shaped to narrowly elliptic or elliptic leaflets, 40–70 mm (1.6–2.8 in) long and 10–20 mm (0.39–0.79 in) wide. There is a single sessile glands near the base of the petiole. The flowers are yellow and arranged in groups of four to twenty in upper leaf axils on a peduncle 20–40 mm (0.79–1.57 in) long, each flower on a pedicel 12–15 mm (0.47–0.59 in) long. The petals are up to 10 mm (0.39 in) long and there are six fertile stamens, the anthers 3–4 mm (0.12–0.16 in) long as well as three staminodes. Flowering occurs in most months with a peak in summer, and the fruit is a dark brown, cylindrical pod 40–50 mm (1.6–2.0 in) long and about 5 mm (0.20 in) wide.

== Taxonomy ==
This species was first formally described in 1926 by Karel Domin who gave it the name Cassia sophera var. clavigera in Bibliotheca Botanica. In 1988, Barbara Rae Randell raised the variety to species status as Senna clavigera in the Journal of the Adelaide Botanic Garden. The specific epithet (clavigera) means "club-bearer".

== Distribution and habitat ==
Senna clavigera grows in wet forest and on the edges of rainforest in eastern Queensland and in New South Wales as far south as the Shoalhaven River. It is possibly weedy in some areas.
