= Senna holosericea =

Scientific classification
- Kingdom: Plantae
- Clade: Tracheophytes
- Clade: Angiosperms
- Clade: Eudicots
- Clade: Rosids
- Order: Fabales
- Family: Fabaceae
- Subfamily: Caesalpinioideae
- Genus: Senna
- Species: S. holosericea

Binomial name
- Senna holosericea Fresen.

Species of legume

Senna holosericea is a perennial herb with yellow flowers that is native to the Arabian Peninsula, Chad, Djibouti, Egypt, Eritrea, Ethiopia, India, Pakistan, Socotra, Somalia and Sudan.

== Habitat ==
Senna holosericea is widespread in drier areas and is also common on coastal plains.

== Description ==
Senna holosericea is a prostrate or ascending perennial herb that grows to 0.5m tall. Its stems are densely hairy with spreading hairs. The leaves are 5–15 cm long, paripinnate with 4-8 pairs of leaflets, eglandular; leaflets oblong- elliptic and densely pubescent. Flowers are yellow in long axillary and terminal racemes. Has five petals, and ten stamens, anthers unequal in size: 2 large, 7mm long; 5 medium-sized, 2–3 mm long and 3 small, 1mm long. Has pods that are oblong, slightly curved and conspicuously hairy. Seeds are triangular, 4.5-5.5 X 2.6-4mm.

== Uses ==
The leaves are moist and mucilaginous and were traditionally used in Dhofar as cleaning material to wipe writing boards.
