= Senna stipulacea =

Scientific classification
- Kingdom: Plantae
- Clade: Tracheophytes
- Clade: Angiosperms
- Clade: Eudicots
- Clade: Rosids
- Order: Fabales
- Family: Fabaceae
- Subfamily: Caesalpinioideae
- Genus: Senna
- Species: S. stipulacea

Binomial name
- Senna stipulacea (W.T.Aiton) H.S.Irwin & Barneby

Species of flowering plant

Senna stipulacea is a species of flowering plant in the family Fabaceae. It is endemic to Chile, where it is distributed from the Coquimbo to the Los Lagos regions.
