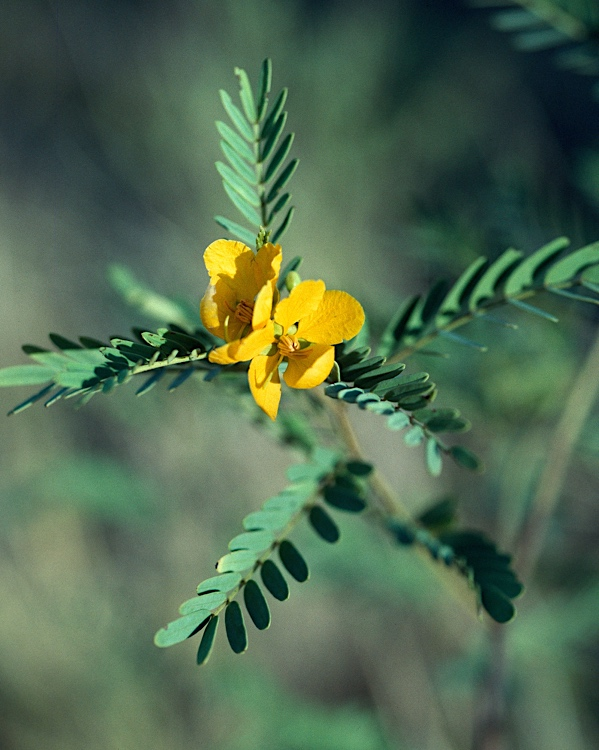
- In Ka Ka Mundi National Park

Scientific classification
- Kingdom: Plantae
- Clade: Tracheophytes
- Clade: Angiosperms
- Clade: Eudicots
- Clade: Rosids
- Order: Fabales
- Family: Fabaceae
- Subfamily: Caesalpinioideae
- Genus: Senna
- Species: S. coronilloides

Binomial name
- Senna coronilloides (Benth.) Randell

Synonyms
- Cassia coronilloides Benth.

= Senna coronilloides =

Brigalow senna

Species of legume

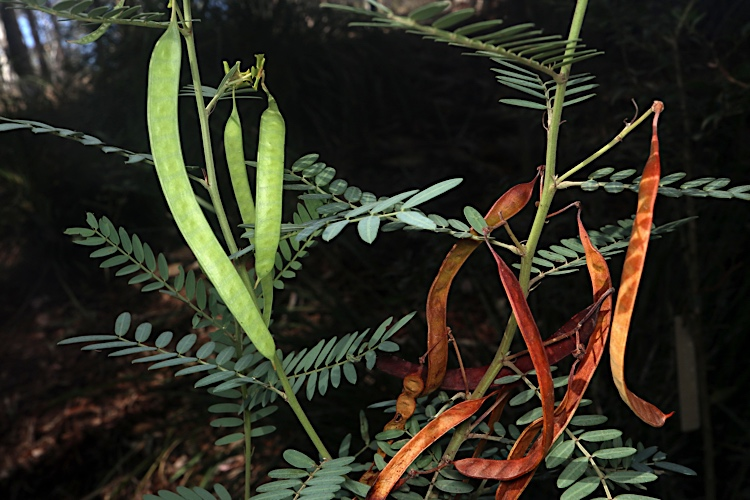
Pods in the Australian National Botanic Gardens

Senna coronilloides, commonly known as brigalow senna, is a species of flowering plant in the family Fabaceae and is endemic to eastern Australia. It is an erect, sprawling shrub with pinnate leaves with nine to twelve pairs of elliptic leaflets, and groups of three to five yellow flowers in upper leaf axils.

== Description ==
Senna coronilloides is an erect, sprawling, more or less glabrous, shrub that typically grows to a height of up to 3 m (9.8 ft). Its leaves are pinnate, 50–90 mm (2.0–3.5 in) long with nine to twelve pairs of elliptic leaflets, 10–20 mm (0.39–0.79 in) long and 3–8 mm (0.12–0.31 in) wide on a petiole 5–10 mm (0.20–0.39 in) long. There are one or two stalked glands between the lowest pair of leaflets . The flowers are yellow and arranged in groups of three to five in upper leaf axils on a peduncle 10–20 mm (0.39–0.79 in) long, each flower on a pedicel about 10 mm (0.39 in) long. The petals are 10–13 mm (0.39–0.51 in) long and there are ten fertile stamens, the anthers 4–6 mm (0.16–0.24 in) long. Flowering mostly occurs from spring to autumn, and the fruit is a thick but flattened pod 60–80 mm (2.4–3.1 in) long and 4–6 mm (0.16–0.24 in) wide.

== Taxonomy ==
This species was first formally described in 1848 by George Bentham who gave it the name Cassia coronilloides in Thomas Mitchell's Journal of an Expedition into the Interior of Tropical Australia. In 1989, Barbara Rae Randell reclassified the species as Senna coronilloides in the Journal of the Adelaide Botanic Garden.

== Distribution and habitat ==
Senna coronilloides grows in forest and brigalow woodland in south-eastern eastern Queensland and in New South Wales as far south as Scone.
