= Senna heptanthera =

Scientific classification
- Kingdom: Plantae
- Clade: Tracheophytes
- Clade: Angiosperms
- Clade: Eudicots
- Clade: Rosids
- Order: Fabales
- Family: Fabaceae
- Subfamily: Caesalpinioideae
- Genus: Senna
- Species: S. heptanthera

Binomial name
- Senna heptanthera (F.Muell.) Randell

Synonyms
- Cassia heptanthera F.Muell.; Cassia oligoclada auct. non F.Muell.: Symon, D.E. (December 1966)

Species of legume

Senna heptanthera is a species of flowering plant in the family Fabaceae and is endemic to Arnhem Land in the north of the Northern Territory. It is a creeping, herbaceous perennial with pinnate leaves with one or two pairs of broadly egg-shaped leaflets, and yellow flowers arranged in groups of eight to ten, with seven fertile stamens in each flower.

== Description ==
Senna heptanthera is a creeping, herbaceous perennial that has leaves up to 60 mm (2.4 in) long on a petiole up to 30 mm (1.2 in) long. The leaves are pinnate with one or two pairs of broadly egg-shaped leaflets, 20–50 mm (0.79–1.97 in) long and 20–40 mm (0.79–1.57 in) wide, spaced up to 30 mm (1.2 in) apart. There is a single, sessile gland between the lowest pair of leaflets. The flowers are yellow and usually arranged in groups of eight to ten in upper leaf axils on a peduncle 30–60 mm (1.2–2.4 in) long, each flower on a pedicel up to 15 mm (0.59 in) long. The petals are up to 10 mm (0.39 in) long and there are seven fertile stamens in each flower, the anthers about 4 mm (0.16 in) long. Flowering occurs in February and March and the fruit is a flat pod.

== Taxonomy ==
This species was first formally described in 1876 by Ferdinand von Mueller who gave it the name Cassia heptanthera in Fragmenta Phytographiae Australiae, from specimens collected near the Liverpool River. In 1989, Barbara Rae Randell transferred the species to the genus Senna as Senna heptanthera in the Journal of the Adelaide Botanic Gardens.

== Distribution and habitat ==
Senna heptanthera occurs in northern Arnhem Land.
