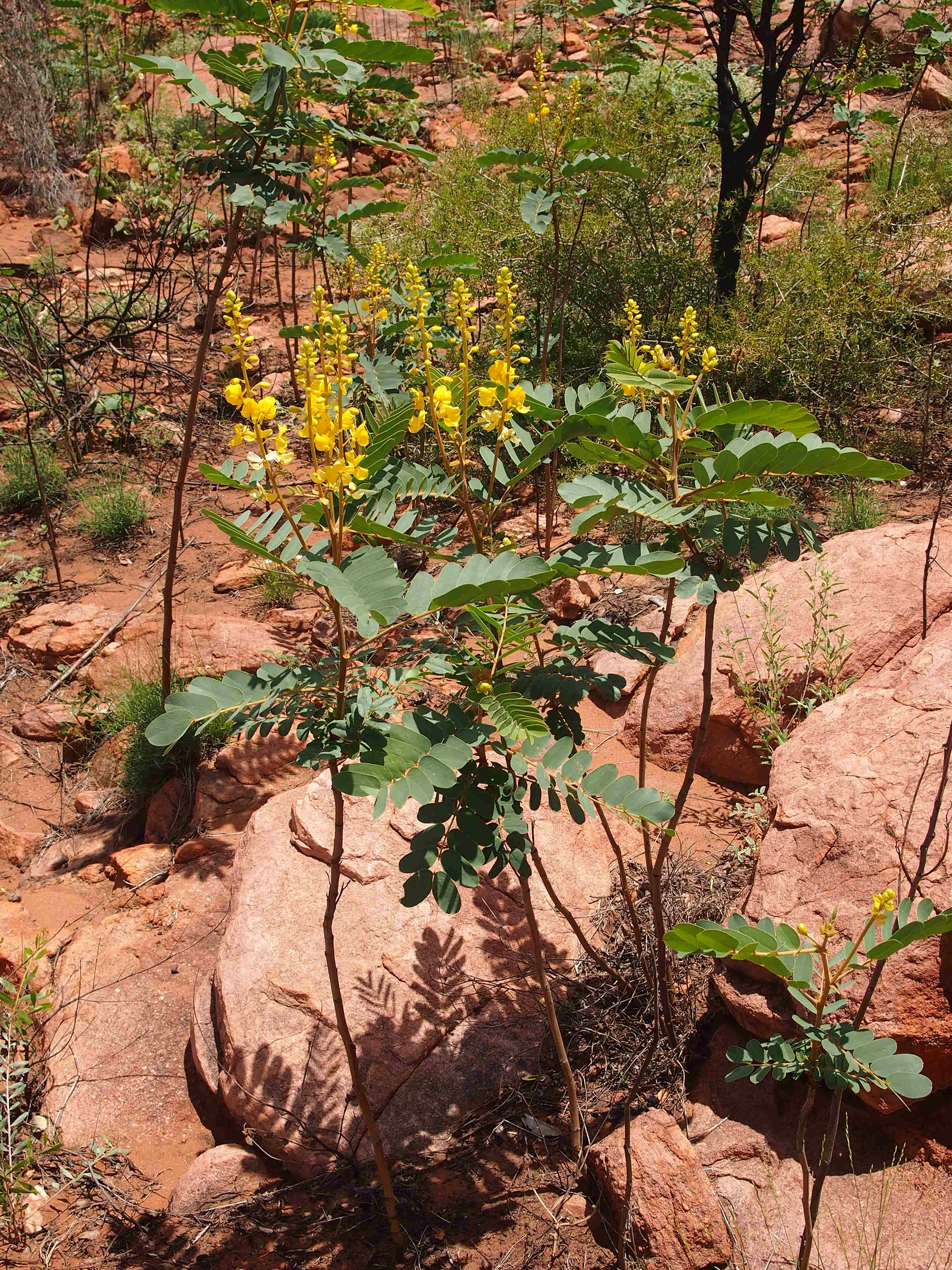

Scientific classification
- Kingdom: Plantae
- Clade: Tracheophytes
- Clade: Angiosperms
- Clade: Eudicots
- Clade: Rosids
- Order: Fabales
- Family: Fabaceae
- Subfamily: Caesalpinioideae
- Genus: Senna
- Species: S. venusta

Binomial name
- Senna venusta (F.Muell.) Randell

Synonyms
- Cassia venusta F.Muell.

= Senna venusta =

Species of legume

Senna venusta, commonly known as graceful cassia, is a species of flowering plant in the family Fabaceae and is endemic to northern Australia. It is an erect shrub with pinnate leaves with six to fifteen pairs of oblong to egg-shaped leaflets, fifteen to forty yellow flowers arranged in upper leaf axils in a cone-like head, each flower with seven fertile stamens and a flat pod.

== Description ==
Senna venusta is an erect shrub that typically grows to a height of up to 2 m (6 ft 7 in), with soft hairs on vegetative parts but mostly otherwise glabrous. Its leaves are pinnate, 100–350 mm (3.9–13.8 in) long on a petiole 10–30 mm (0.39–1.18 in) long, with 6 to 15 pairs of oblong to egg-shaped leaflets 30–80 mm (1.2–3.1 in) long and 10–35 mm (0.39–1.38 in) wide, spaced 15–30 mm (0.59–1.18 in) apart. The flowers are yellow and densely arranged in cone-like heads of 15 to 40 in upper leaf axils and ends of branchlets on a peduncle 40–80 mm (1.6–3.1 in) long, each flower on a pedicel 12–15 mm (0.47–0.59 in) long. The petals are about 15 mm (0.59 in) long and there are seven fertile stamens and three staminodes in each flower, the anthers of two different lengths. Flowering occurs from February to September, and the fruit is a flat pod 40–80 mm (1.6–3.1 in) long and 9–14 mm (0.35–0.55 in) wide.

== Taxonomy ==
This species was first formally described in 1859 by Ferdinand von Mueller who gave it the name Cassia venusta in his Fragmenta Phytographiae Australiae. In 1990, Barbara Rae Randell transferred the species to Senna as S. venusta in the Journal of the Adelaide Botanic Gardens. The specific epithet (venusta) means 'charming' or 'beautiful'.

== Distribution and habitat ==
Senna venusta grows in sand on gravel or in lateritic soils, often with Triodia species, and is widespread in arid areas of northern Western Australia and the Northern Territory, with a few collections in north-western Queensland.

== Conservation status ==
Senna venusta is listed as "not threatened" by the Government of Western Australia Department of Biodiversity, Conservation and Attractions, as of "least concern" under the Northern Territory Government Territory Parks and Wildlife Conservation Act and the Queensland Government Nature Conservation Act 1992.
