= Senna glaucifolia =

Scientific classification
- Kingdom: Plantae
- Clade: Tracheophytes
- Clade: Angiosperms
- Clade: Eudicots
- Clade: Rosids
- Order: Fabales
- Family: Fabaceae
- Subfamily: Caesalpinioideae
- Genus: Senna
- Species: S. glaucifolia

Binomial name
- Senna glaucifolia (Randell) Randell

Synonyms
- Senna artemisioides subsp. glaucifolia Randell

Species of legume

Senna glaucifolia is a species of flowering plant in the family Fabaceae and is endemic to arid Central Australia. It is an erect shrub with pinnate leaves with two to four pairs of elliptic leaflets, and yellow flowers arranged in groups of four to seven, with ten fertile stamens in each flower.

== Description ==
Senna glaucifolia is an erect shrub that typically grows to a height of up to 2 m (6 ft 7 in), its stems and foliage reddish glaucous and covered with soft hairs but eventually glabrous. The leaves are pinnate, 30–60 mm (1.2–2.4 in) long on a petiole 10–15 mm (0.39–0.59 in) long with two to four pairs of elliptic leaflets 10–26 mm (0.39–1.02 in) long and 3–8 mm (0.12–0.31 in) wide spaced 6–15 mm (0.24–0.59 in) apart. There are up to three, sessile glands between the lowest pairs of leaflets. The flowers are yellow and arranged in upper leaf axils in groups of four to seven on a peduncle 15–20 mm (0.59–0.79 in) long, each flower on a pedicel 10–20 mm (0.39–0.79 in) long. The petals are 9–10 mm (0.35–0.39 in) long and there are ten fertile stamens, the anthers 3–5 mm (0.12–0.20 in) long. Flowering occurs from June to November, and the fruit is a flat pod 40–80 mm (1.6–3.1 in) long.

== Taxonomy ==
This species was first formally described in 1989 by Barbara Rae Randell who gave it the name Senna artemisioides subsp. glaucifolia in the Journal of the Adelaide Botanic Gardens from specimens collected near the Giles Settlement in the Rawlinson Ranges about 70 km (43 mi) west of the Northern Territory border, in 1964. In 1998, Randell raised the subspecies to species status as Senna glaucifolia in the Flora of Australia. The specific epithet (glaucifolia) means "bluish-grey-leaved".

== Distribution and habitat ==
Senna glaucifolia grows in a wide range of habitats in arid areas of inland Western Australia and the Northern Territory.
