= Senna scandens =

Conservation status
- Endangered (IUCN 3.1)

Scientific classification
- Kingdom: Plantae
- Clade: Tracheophytes
- Clade: Angiosperms
- Clade: Eudicots
- Clade: Rosids
- Order: Fabales
- Family: Fabaceae
- Subfamily: Caesalpinioideae
- Genus: Senna
- Species: S. scandens

Binomial name
- Senna scandens (Ruiz & Pav. ex G.Don) H.S.Irwin & Barneby

Synonyms
- Cassia scandens Ruiz & Pav. ex G.Don

Species of legume

Senna scandens is a species of flowering plant in the legume family, Fabaceae. It is endemic to Ecuador. There are five known populations. It grows in wet forest habitat in the western Andes.
