= Senna flexuosa =

Scientific classification
- Kingdom: Plantae
- Clade: Tracheophytes
- Clade: Angiosperms
- Clade: Eudicots
- Clade: Rosids
- Order: Fabales
- Family: Fabaceae
- Subfamily: Caesalpinioideae
- Genus: Senna
- Species: S. flexuosa

Binomial name
- Senna flexuosa (Randell) Randell

Synonyms
- Senna cardiosperma subsp. flexuosa Randell

Species of legume

Senna flexuosa is a species of flowering plant in the family Fabaceae and is endemic to Western Australia. It is an erect or spreading shrub with pinnate leaves with ten to thirteen pairs of egg-shaped leaflets, and yellow flowers arranged in groups of three to five, with ten fertile stamens in each flower.

== Description ==
Senna flexuosa is an erect or spreading shrub that typically grows to a height of up to 2 m (6 ft 7 in), its stems and foliage covered with soft hairs pressed against the surface. The leaves are pinnate, 30–50 mm (1.2–2.0 in) long on a petiole 3–8 mm (0.12–0.31 in) long with ten to thirteen pairs of egg-shaped leaflets 4–10 mm (0.16–0.39 in) long and 2–4 mm (0.079–0.157 in) wide. There are one or two, sessile glands between the lowest pairs of leaflets. The flowers are yellow and arranged in upper leaf axils in groups of three to five on a peduncle mostly 8–13 mm (0.31–0.51 in) long, each flower on a pedicel 7–10 mm (0.28–0.39 in) long. The petals are 7–10 mm (0.28–0.39 in) long and there are ten fertile stamens, the anthers about 3.5 mm (0.14 in) long. Flowering occurs in spring and summer, and the fruit is a flat pod 40–50 mm (1.6–2.0 in) long.

== Taxonomy ==
This species was first formally described in 1989 by Barbara Rae Randell who gave it the name Senna cardiosperma subsp. flexuosa in the Journal of the Adelaide Botanic Gardens from specimens collected near Jibberding by Charles Gardner in 1953. In 1998, Randell raised the subspecies to species status as Senna flexuosa in the Flora of Australia. The specific epithet (flexuosa) means "zig zag", referring to the stems.

== Distribution and habitat ==
Senna flexuosa grows in sandy soil in the Avon Wheatbelt, Coolgardie, Murchison and Yalgoo bioregions of Western Australia.
