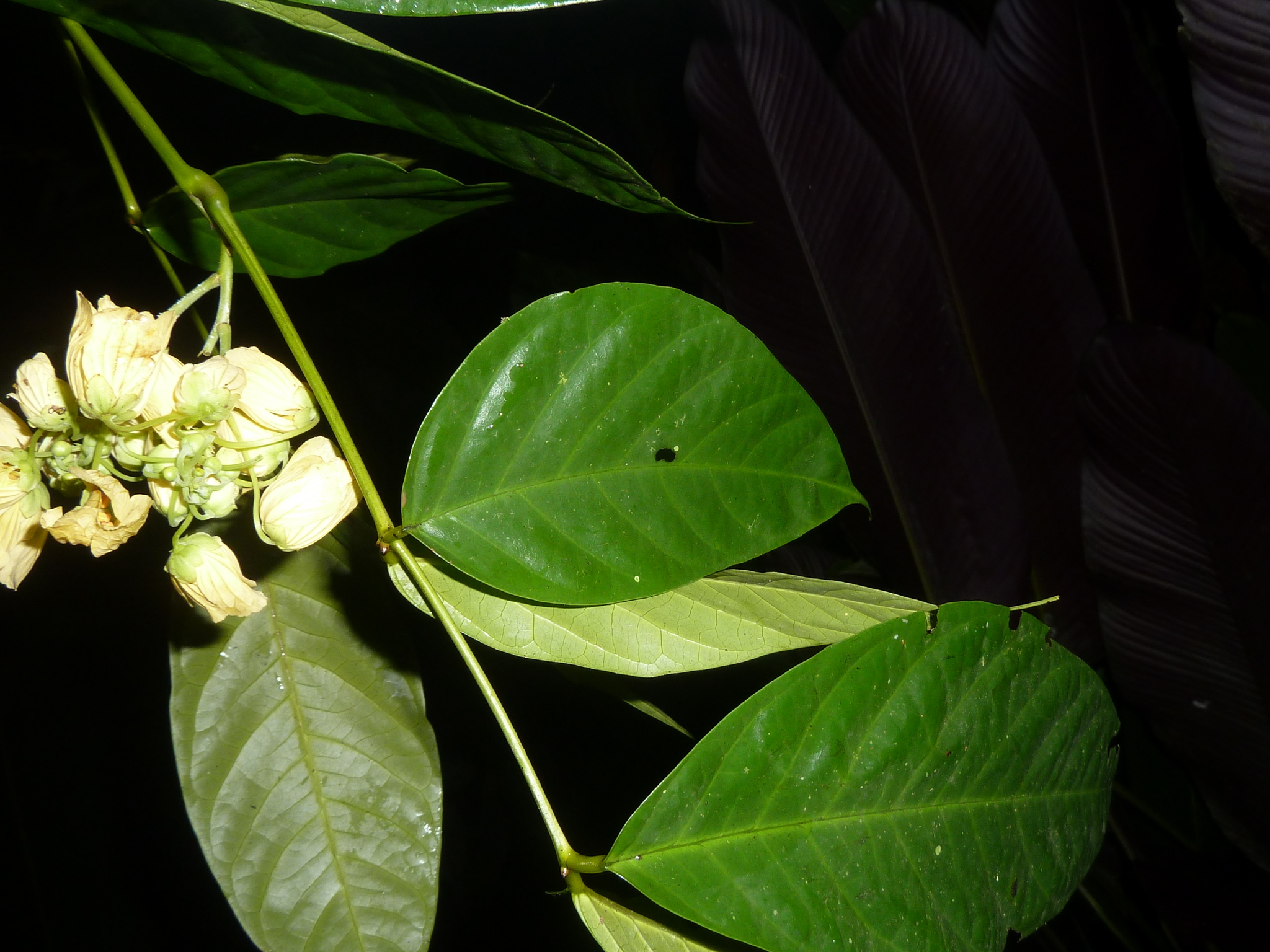

Conservation status
- Near Threatened (IUCN 3.1)

Scientific classification
- Kingdom: Plantae
- Clade: Tracheophytes
- Clade: Angiosperms
- Clade: Eudicots
- Clade: Rosids
- Order: Fabales
- Family: Fabaceae
- Subfamily: Caesalpinioideae
- Genus: Senna
- Species: S. caudata

Binomial name
- Senna caudata (Standl.) H.S.Irwin & Barneby

Synonyms
- Cassia caudata Standl.; nChamaefistula caudata (Standl.) Britton & Rose

= Senna caudata =

Species of legume

Senna caudata is a flowering plant species in the legume family (Fabaceae). This plant is found only in Costa Rica and Panama.
