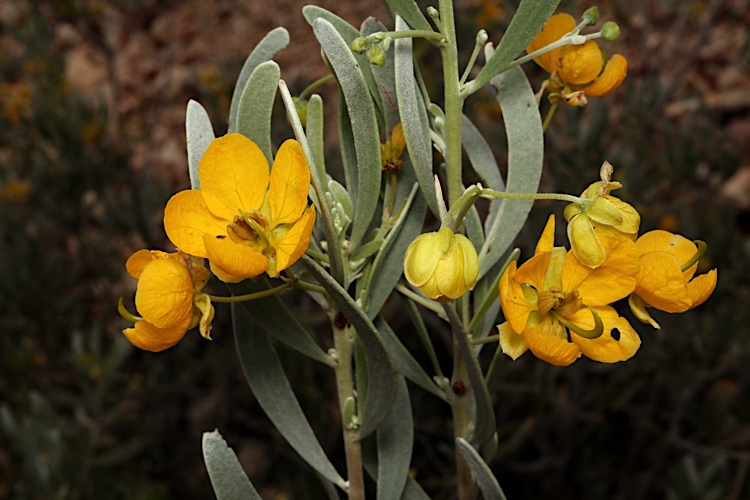

Scientific classification
- Kingdom: Plantae
- Clade: Tracheophytes
- Clade: Angiosperms
- Clade: Eudicots
- Clade: Rosids
- Order: Fabales
- Family: Fabaceae
- Subfamily: Caesalpinioideae
- Genus: Senna
- Species: S. phyllodinea

Binomial name
- Senna phyllodinea (R.Br.) Symon

Synonyms
- Cassia phyllodinea R.Br.

= Senna phyllodinea =

Species of plant

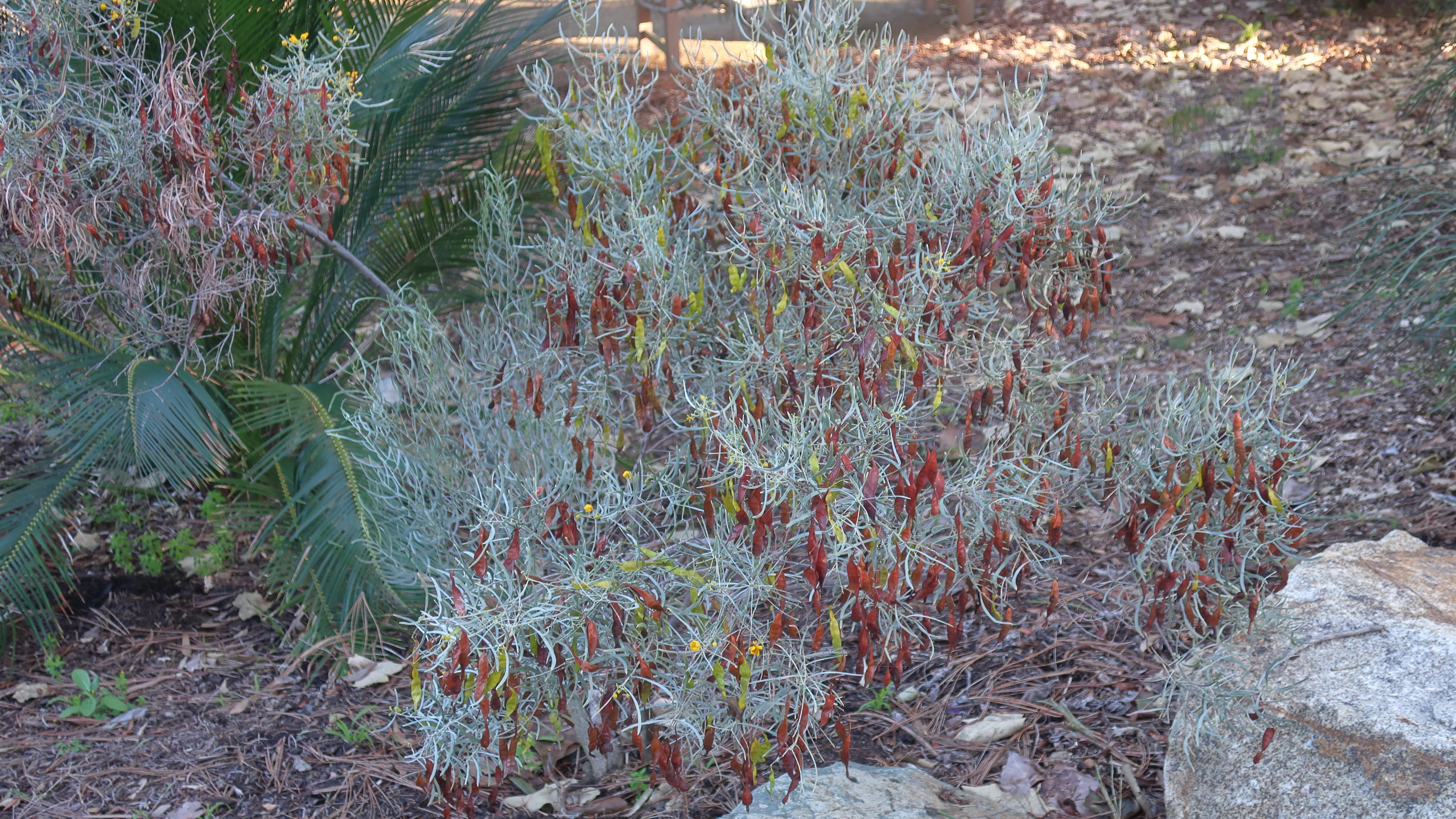
Habit in San Diego Botanic Garden

Senna phyllodinea is a species of flowering plant in the legume family Fabaceae, and is endemic to arid areas of inland Australia. It is a spreading, bushy shrub with its leaves reduced to curved phyllodes, and yellow flowers arranged in racemes with ten fertile stamens in each flower.

== Description ==
Senna phyllodinea is a spreading, bushy shrub that typically grows to a height of up to 1.5 m (4 ft 11 in). Immature plants have pinnate leaves, but the leaves in mature plants are reduced to curved phyllodes 15–60 mm (0.59–2.36 in) long and 2–8 mm (0.079–0.315 in) wide, covered with silvery hairs pressed against the surface. The flowers are yellow and arranged in racemes near the ends of the branches, the petals 7–10 mm (0.28–0.39 in) long with ten fertile stamens in each flower. Flowering occurs all year and the fruit is a flat, curved pod 30–100 mm (1.2–3.9 in) long and 8–13 mm (0.31–0.51 in) wide.

== Taxonomy ==
This species was first formally described in 1849 by Robert Brown who gave it the name Cassia phyllodinea in Charles Sturt's Narrative of an Expedition into Central Australia, from specimens Sturt collected near Spencer Gulf in 1802. In 1998, David Eric Symon transferred the species to Senna as Senna phyllodinea in the Journal of the Adelaide Botanic Gardens.

== Distribution and habitat ==
Senna phyllodinea grows in a variety of soils in arid areas of western New South Wales, Queensland, South Australia and the Northern Territory.
