= Senna manicula =

Scientific classification
- Kingdom: Plantae
- Clade: Tracheophytes
- Clade: Angiosperms
- Clade: Eudicots
- Clade: Rosids
- Order: Fabales
- Family: Fabaceae
- Subfamily: Caesalpinioideae
- Genus: Senna
- Species: S. manicula

Binomial name
- Senna manicula (Symon) Randell

Synonyms
- Cassia manicula Symon; Senna cardiosperma subsp. manicula (Symon) Randell

Species of legume

Senna manicula is a species of flowering plant in the family Fabaceae and is endemic to inland Western Australia. It is an erect shrub with pinnate leaves with three or four pairs of linear leaflets, and yellow flowers arranged singly or in pairs, with ten fertile stamens in each flower.

== Description ==
Senna manicula is an erect shrub that typically grows to a height of 0.3–1.5 m (1 ft 0 in – 4 ft 11 in) and is covered with soft hairs. The leaves are 10–15 mm (0.39–0.59 in) long on a petiole 1–3 mm (0.039–0.118 in) long. The leaves are pinnate with two or three pairs of linear leaflets 6–10 mm (0.24–0.39 in) long and about 1 mm (0.039 in) wide, spaced 3–4 mm (0.12–0.16 in) apart. The flowers are yellow and arranged singly or in pairs in upper leaf axils on a peduncle 2–5 mm (0.079–0.197 in) long, each flower on a pedicel about 10 mm (0.39 in) long. The petals are 4–6 mm (0.16–0.24 in) long and there are ten fertile stamens in each flower, the anthers 2–4 mm (0.079–0.157 in) long and of different lengths. Flowering occurs in winter and the fruit is a flat, straight pod.

== Taxonomy ==
This species was first formally described in 1966 by David Eric Symon who gave it the name Cassia manicula in Transactions of the Royal Society of South Australia, from specimens collected near the Diorite King mine, north of Leonora in 1960. In 1998, Barbara Rae Randell transferred the species to Senna as Senna manicula in the Flora of Australia. The specific epithet (manicula) refers to "a fanciful resemblance of the leaves to a little hand".

== Distribution and habitat ==
Senna manicula grows in arid sites on rocky hillsides in the Murchison bioregion of inland Western Australia.

== Conservation status ==
Senna manicula is listed as "not threatened" by the Government of Western Australia Department of Biodiversity, Conservation and Attractions.
