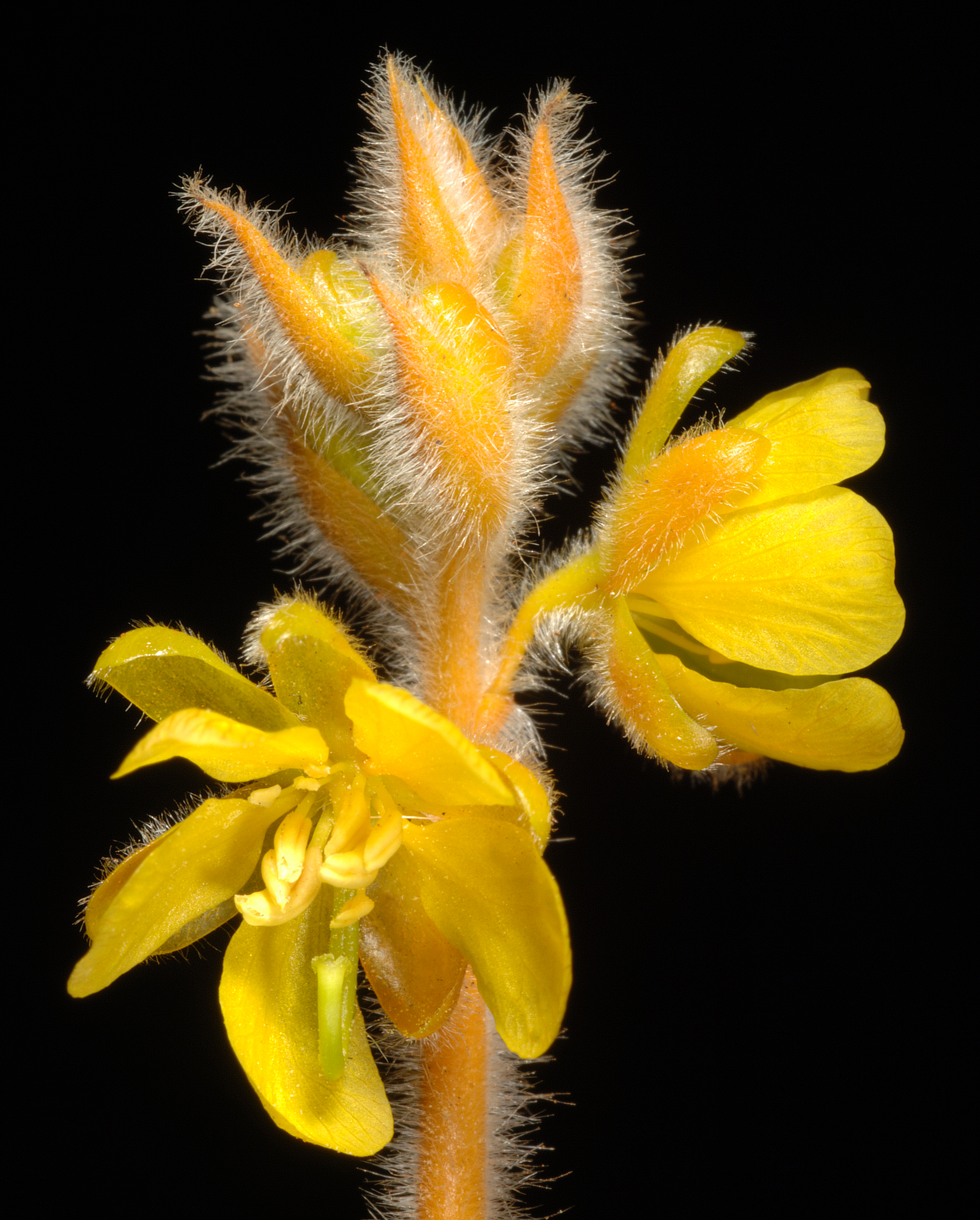

Scientific classification
- Kingdom: Plantae
- Clade: Tracheophytes
- Clade: Angiosperms
- Clade: Eudicots
- Clade: Rosids
- Order: Fabales
- Family: Fabaceae
- Subfamily: Caesalpinioideae
- Genus: Senna
- Species: S. notabilis

Binomial name
- Senna notabilis (F.Muell.) Randell

Synonyms
- Cassia notbilis F.Muell.

= Senna notabilis =

Species of plant

Senna notabilis, commonly known as cockroach bush, is a species of flowering plant in the legume family Fabaceae, and is endemic to northern Australia. It is an erect, softly-hairy, annual or perennial shrub with pinnate leaves with six to twelve pairs of lance-shaped leaflets, and yellow flowers arranged in groups of twenty to thirty, with seven fertile stamens in each flower.

== Description ==
Senna notabilis is an erect, softly-hairy, annual or perennial shrub or shubshrub that typically grows to a height of 0.3–1.5 m (1 ft 0 in – 4 ft 11 in). Its leaves are up to 100–200 mm (3.9–7.9 in) long on a petiole 15–20 mm (0.59–0.79 in) long, with six to twelve pairs of lance-shaped leaflets 15–30 mm (0.59–1.18 in) long and 8–12 mm (0.31–0.47 in) wide, spaced 10–15 mm (0.39–0.59 in) apart. There are bristly, egg-shaped stipules at the base of the petiole and small glands between most pairs of leaflets. The flowers are yellow and arranged in dense groups of twenty to thirty on the ends of the branches and in leaf axils on a peduncle 25–60 mm (0.98–2.36 in) long, each flower on a pedicel about 5 mm (0.20 in) long. The petals are about 7 mm (0.28 in) long and there are seven fertile stamens and three staminodes in each flower, two anthers about 3 mm (0.12 in) long and the others shorter. Flowering occurs from May to October and the fruit is a flat pod 25–40 mm (0.98–1.57 in) long and 10–15 mm (0.39–0.59 in) wide.

== Taxonomy ==
Cockroach bush was first formally described in 1862 by Ferdinand von Mueller who gave it the name Cassia notabilis in Fragmenta Phytographiae Australiae from specimens collected by John McDouall Stuart. In 1990, Barbara Rae Randell transferred the species to Senna as Senna notbilis in the Journal of the Adelaide Botanic Gardens. The specific epithet (notabilis) means "notable".

== Distribution and habitat ==
Senna notabilis occurs in all mainland states and territories except Victoria, and grows in a range of arid habitats, including rocky hillsides, clays and deep desert sands. It is often found with Triodia species. It is widely distributed and common in Western Australia and the Northern Territory, with only a few collections in South Australia and New South Wales.

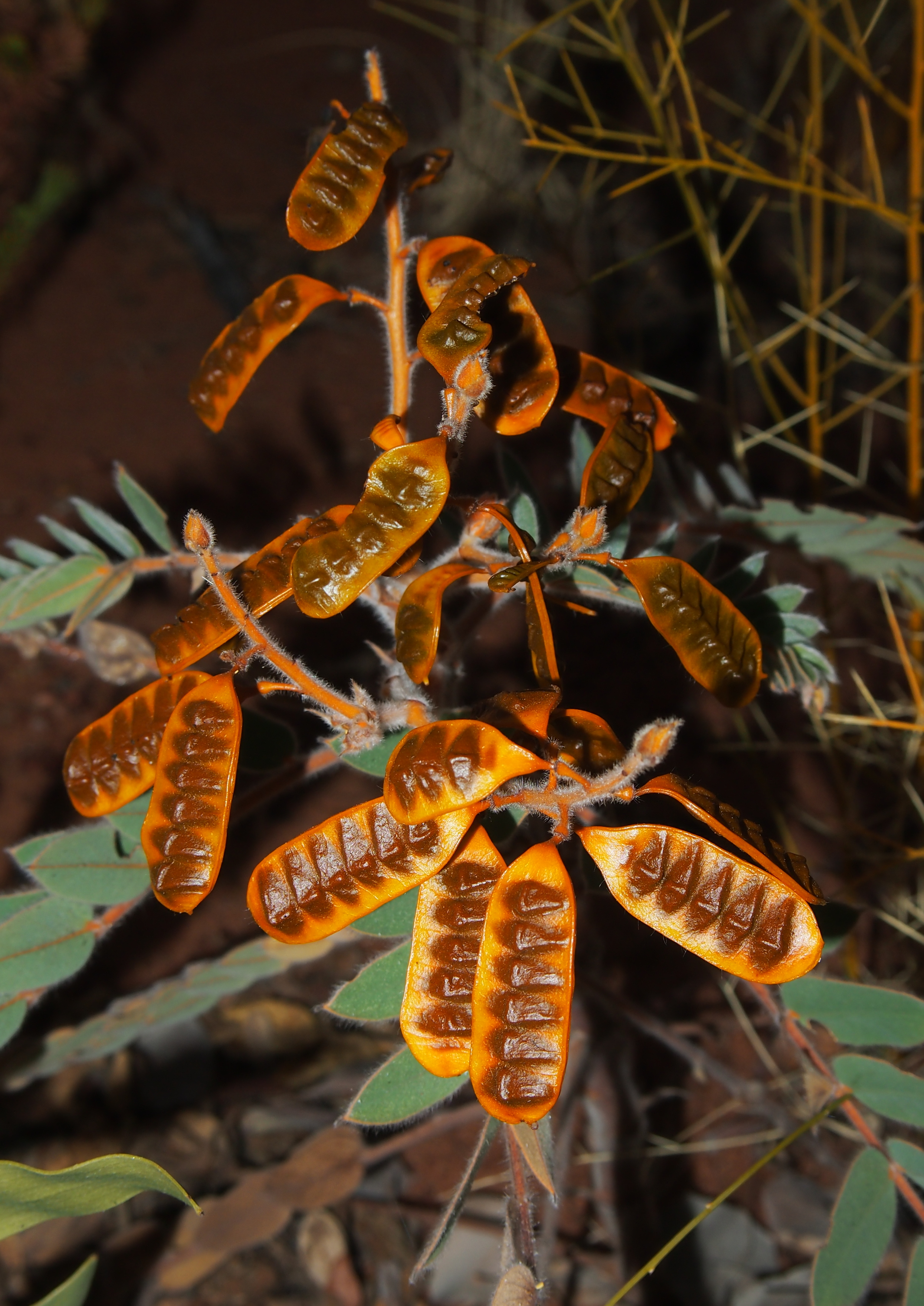
Pods

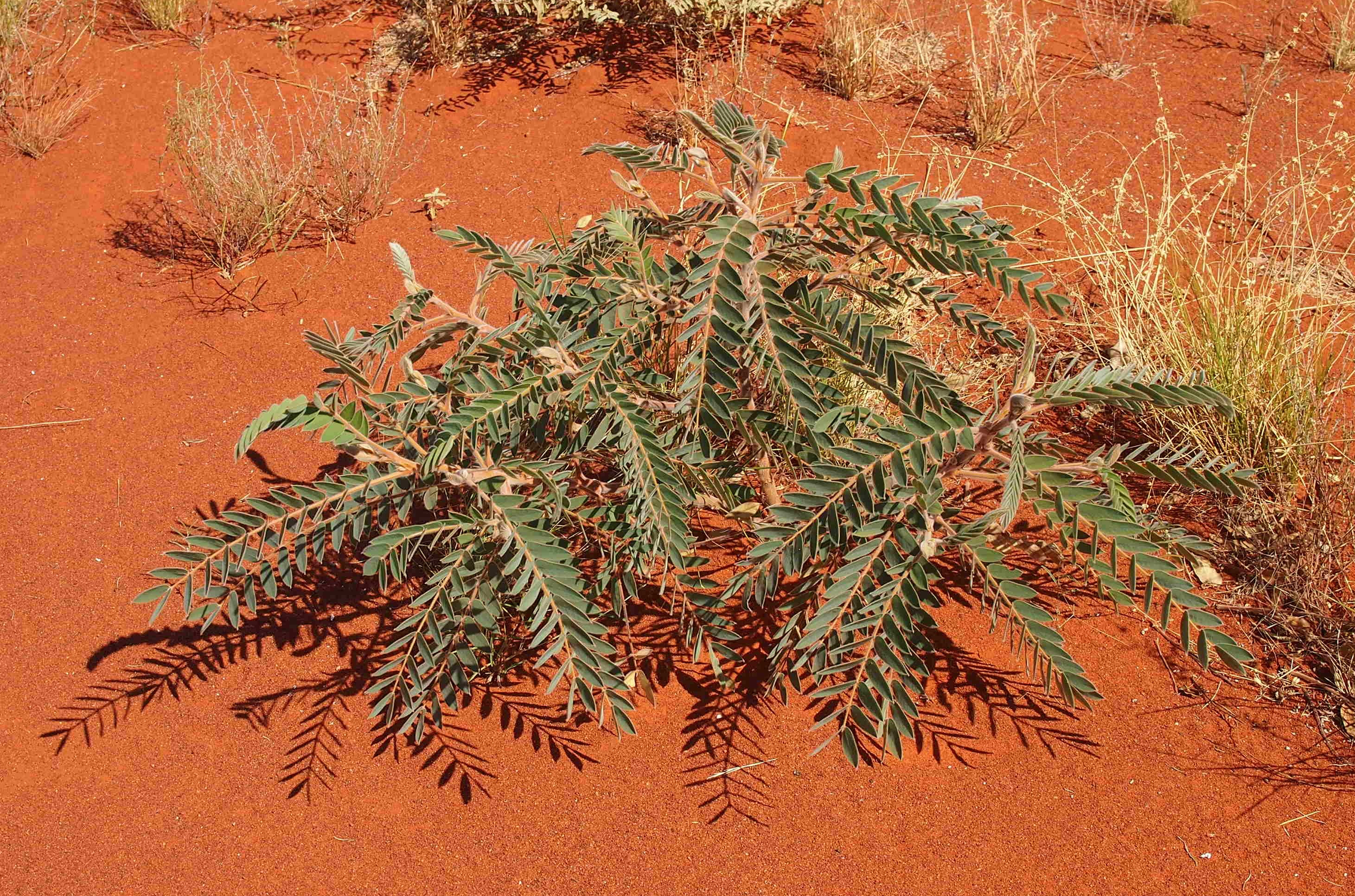
Leaves

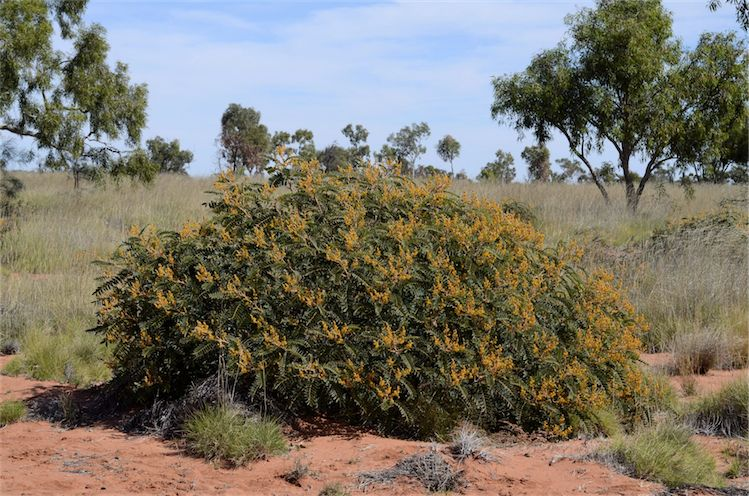
Habit
