= Senna obliqua =

Scientific classification
- Kingdom: Plantae
- Clade: Tracheophytes
- Clade: Angiosperms
- Clade: Eudicots
- Clade: Rosids
- Order: Fabales
- Family: Fabaceae
- Subfamily: Caesalpinioideae
- Genus: Senna
- Species: S. obliqua

Binomial name
- Senna obliqua (G.Don) H.S.Irwin & Barneby, 1982

Synonyms
- Cassia obliqua (G. Don) Ruiz & Pav. ex G. Don; Chamaefistula elegans G. Don

Species of plant

Senna obliqua is a species of flowering plants in the legume family Fabaceae, and the subfamily Caesalpinioideae. It is found in Peru.
