= Senna trolliiflora =

Conservation status
- Near Threatened (IUCN 3.1)

Scientific classification
- Kingdom: Plantae
- Clade: Tracheophytes
- Clade: Angiosperms
- Clade: Eudicots
- Clade: Rosids
- Order: Fabales
- Family: Fabaceae
- Subfamily: Caesalpinioideae
- Genus: Senna
- Species: S. trolliiflora

Binomial name
- Senna trolliiflora H.S.Irwin & Barneby

Species of legume

Senna trolliiflora is a flowering plant species in the legume family (Fabaceae). It is a near-threatened species found only in Ecuador. Its natural habitat is subtropical or tropical moist lowland forests.
