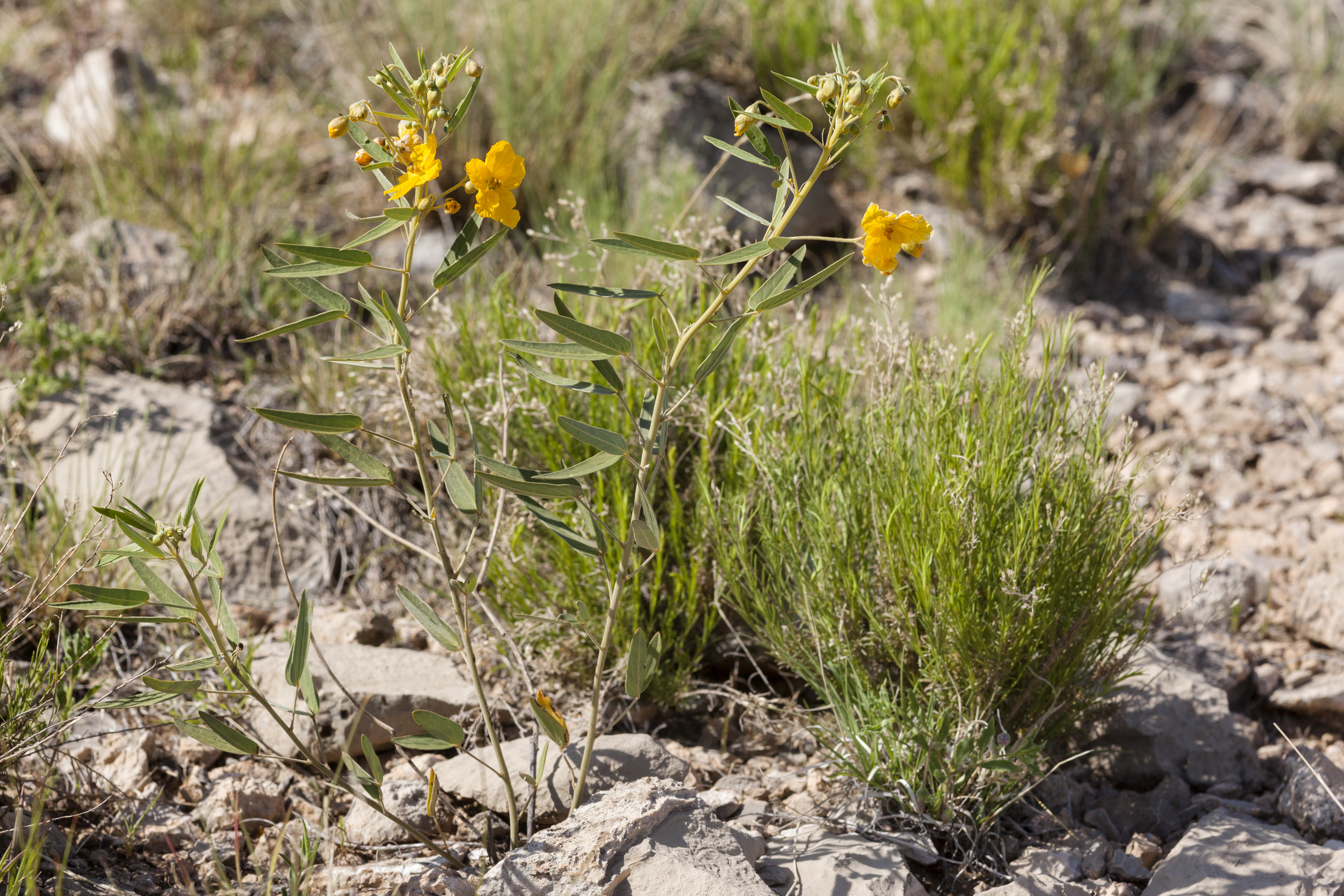
- Habit
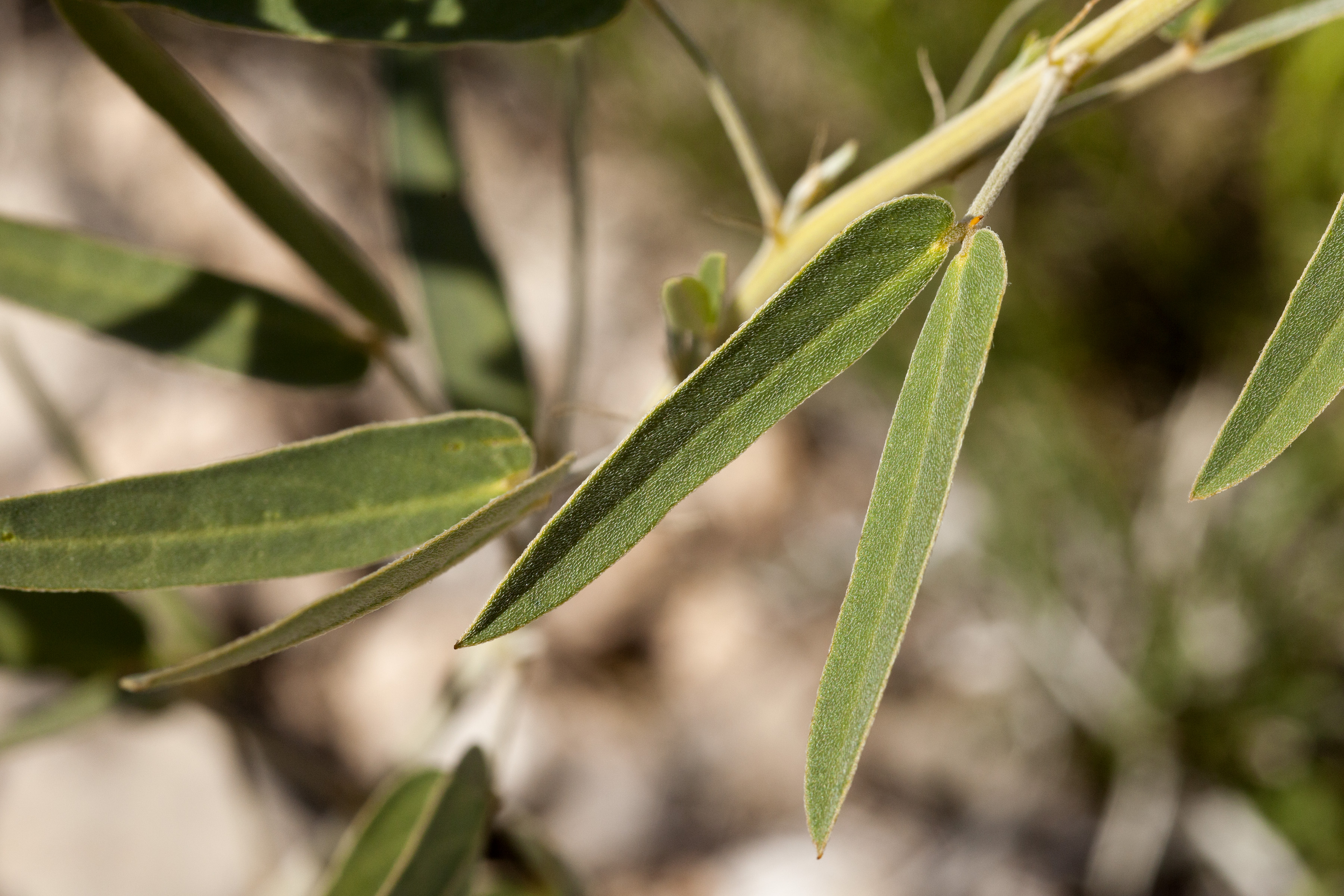
- Leaves

Scientific classification
- Kingdom: Plantae
- Clade: Tracheophytes
- Clade: Angiosperms
- Clade: Eudicots
- Clade: Rosids
- Order: Fabales
- Family: Fabaceae
- Subfamily: Caesalpinioideae
- Genus: Senna
- Species: S. roemeriana

Binomial name
- Senna roemeriana (Scheele) H.S.Irwin & Barneby

Synonyms
- Cassia roemeriana Scheele; Earleocassia roemeriana (Scheele) Britton

= Senna roemeriana =

Species of plant

Senna roemeriana, the twoleaf senna, is a species of flowering plant in the family Fabaceae, native to the US states of New Mexico and Texas, and to northern Mexico. A perennial of limestone soils and typically 18 in (46 cm) tall, it is toxic to livestock, particularly goats and sheep, but they avoid consuming it with proper range management.

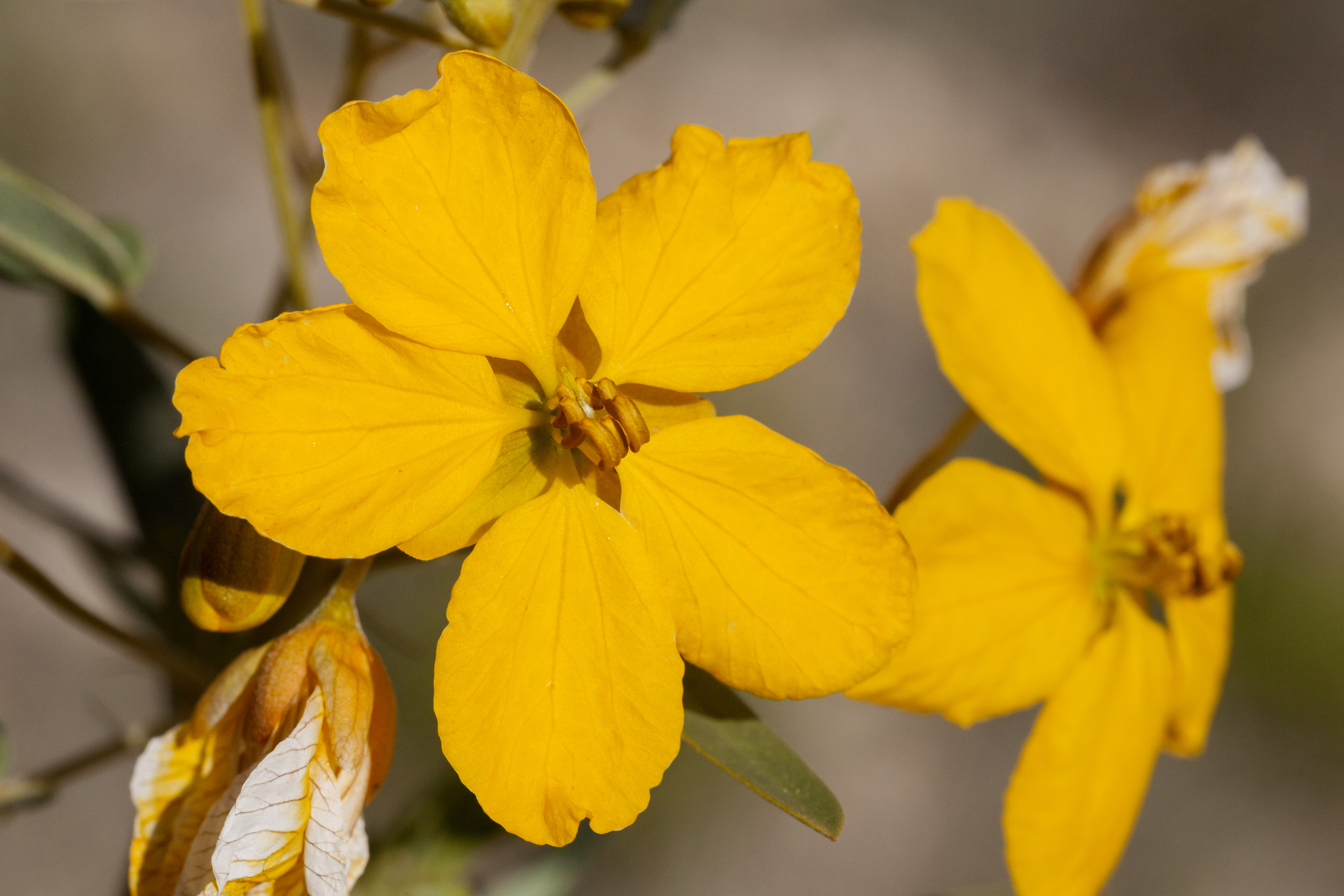
Close-up of flower
