= Senna atomaria =

Conservation status
- Least Concern (IUCN 3.1)

Scientific classification
- Kingdom: Plantae
- Clade: Tracheophytes
- Clade: Angiosperms
- Clade: Eudicots
- Clade: Rosids
- Order: Fabales
- Family: Fabaceae
- Subfamily: Caesalpinioideae
- Genus: Senna
- Species: S. atomaria

Binomial name
- Senna atomaria (L.) H.S.Irwin & Barneby

Synonyms
- List: Cassia arborescens Mill.; Cassia atomaria L.; Cassia chrysophylla A.Rich.; Cassia elliptica Sessé & Moc.; Cassia elliptica Kunth; Cassia emarginata Bertero ex Steud.; Cassia emarginata var. subunijuga B.L.Rob. & Bartlett; Cassia graveolens Colla; Cassia grisea A.Rich.; Cassia longisiliqua L.f.; Cassia lorentzii Niederl.; Cassia michoacanensis Sessé & Moc.; Cassia triflora Vahl; Diplotax arborescens (Mill.) Raf.; Isandrina maxonii Britton & Rose

Species of plant

Senna atomaria, the flor de San Jose, is a species of flowering plant in the family Fabaceae, native to Mexico, Central America, the Caribbean, Colombia, and Venezuela. A shrub or small tree, it is considered a multi-purpose species; fuel, wood, biomass, soil improvement, medicine, and ornament.
