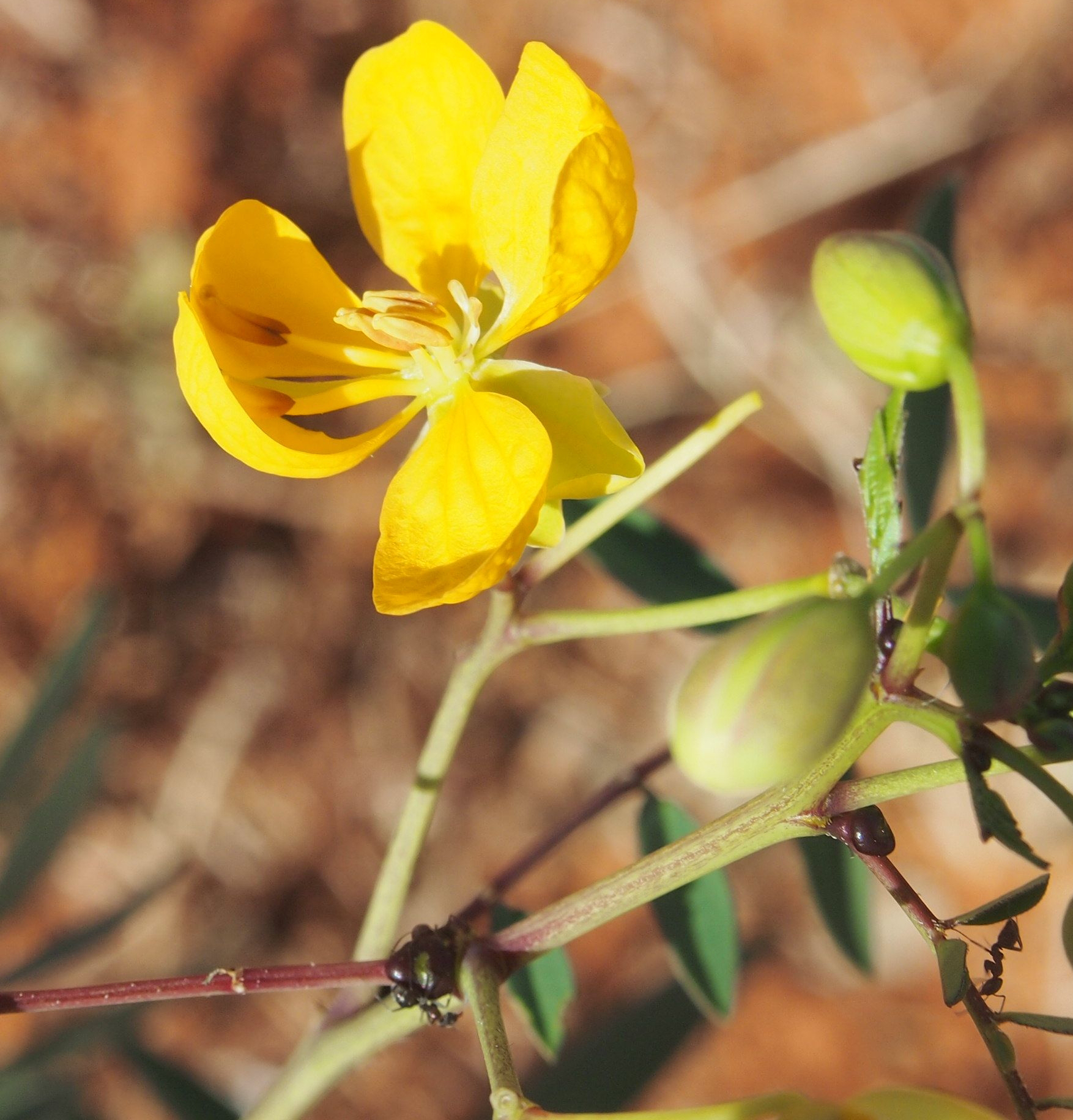

Scientific classification
- Kingdom: Plantae
- Clade: Tracheophytes
- Clade: Angiosperms
- Clade: Eudicots
- Clade: Rosids
- Order: Fabales
- Family: Fabaceae
- Subfamily: Caesalpinioideae
- Genus: Senna
- Species: S. planitiicola

Binomial name
- Senna planitiicola (Domin) Randell

Synonyms
- Cassia planitiicola Domin; Cassia sophera auct. non L.: Black, J.M.

= Senna planitiicola =

Species of legume

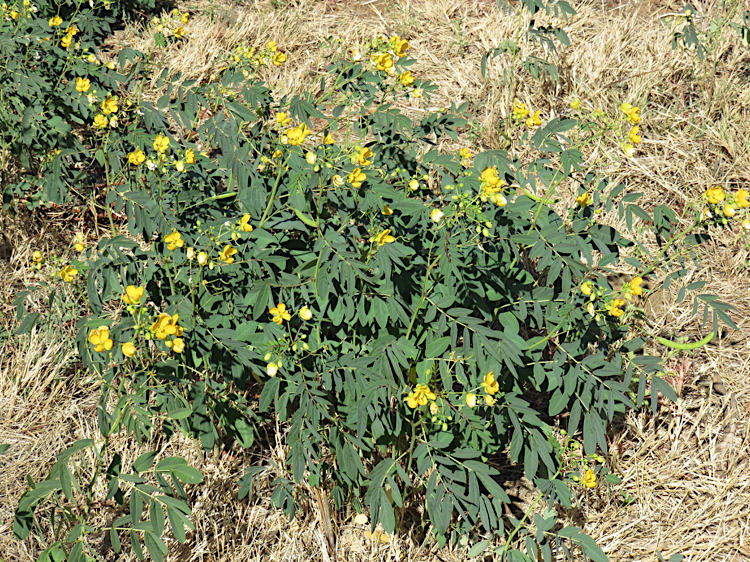
Habit near Normanton, Queensland

Senna planitiicola, commonly known as yellow pea, arsenic bush, ant bush or pepper-leaf senna, is a species of flowering plant in the family Fabaceae and is endemic to northern Australia. It is an erect shrub with pinnate leaves with five to seven pairs of broadly elliptic to egg-shaped leaflets, and groups of three to eight yellow flowers on the ends of branches and in upper leaf axils.

== Description ==
Senna planitiicola is an erect shrub that typically grows to a height of up to 2.5 m (8 ft 2 in), and is more or less glabrous. Its leaves are pinnate, 100–120 mm (3.9–4.7 in) long with five to seven pairs of broadly elliptic to egg-shaped leaflets, 25–50 mm (0.98–1.97 in) long and 15–25 mm (0.59–0.98 in) wide, spaced 15–20 mm (0.59–0.79 in) apart. There is a single, sessile gland 5–8 mm (0.20–0.31 in) above the base of the petiole. The flowers are yellow and arranged in groups of three to eight on the ends of branches and in upper leaf axils on a peduncle 20–40 mm (0.79–1.57 in) long, each flower on a pedicel 10–20 mm (0.39–0.79 in) long. The petals are up to 12 mm (0.47 in) long and there are six fertile stamens, the anthers 3–4 mm (0.12–0.16 in) long, as well as four staminodes. Flowering occurs in most months, and the fruit is a cylindrical pod 75–95 mm (3.0–3.7 in) long and 8–11 mm (0.31–0.43 in) wide.

== Taxonomy ==
This species was first formally described in 1926 by Karel Domin who gave it the name Cassia planitiicola in Bibliotheca Botanica. In 1988, Barbara Rae Randell transferred the species to Senna as S. planitiicola in the Journal of the Adelaide Botanic Garden. The specific epithet (planitiicola) means "inhabitant of level ground".

== Distribution and habitat ==
Senna planitiicola grows in a variety of soils and is widely distributed in north-western Western Australia, in arid parts of the Northern Territory, in northern South Australia and in northern Queensland.
