= Senna sericea =

Scientific classification
- Kingdom: Plantae
- Clade: Tracheophytes
- Clade: Angiosperms
- Clade: Eudicots
- Clade: Rosids
- Order: Fabales
- Family: Fabaceae
- Subfamily: Caesalpinioideae
- Genus: Senna
- Species: S. sericea

Binomial name
- Senna sericea (Symon) Albr. & Symon

Synonyms
- Cassia oligophylla var. sericea Symon

Species of legume

Senna sericea is a species of flowering plant in the family Fabaceae and is endemic to inland north-western Australia. It is an erect shrub with pinnate leaves, with one or two pairs of egg-shaped leaflets, and yellow flowers arranged in groups of four to twelve, with ten fertile stamens in each flower.

== Description ==
Senna sericea is an erect shrub that typically grows to a height of 0.3–2 m (1 ft 0 in – 6 ft 7 in). Its leaves are pinnate, 20–50 mm (0.79–1.97 in) long including a petiole 5–15 mm (0.20–0.59 in) long, with one or two pairs of egg-shaped leaflets. The leaflets are 10–40 mm (0.39–1.57 in) long and 10–22 mm (0.39–0.87 in) wide, spaced 3–12 mm (0.12–0.47 in) apart when two pairs of leaflets are present. There are up to three sessile, flat glands between the leaflets. The flowers are yellow and arranged in upper leaf axils in groups of four to twelve on a peduncle 20–30 mm (0.79–1.18 in) long, each flower on a pedicel 10–15 mm (0.39–0.59 in) long. The petals are 8–10 mm (0.31–0.39 in) long and there are ten fertile stamens, the anthers 3–4 mm (0.12–0.16 in) long and of different lengths. Flowering occurs in winter, and the fruit is a flat pod about 70 mm (2.8 in) long and 15–25 mm (0.59–0.98 in) wide.

== Taxonomy and naming ==
This species was first formally described in 1966 by David Eric Symon, who gave it the name Cassia oligophylla var. sericea in the Transactions of the Royal Society of South Australia from specimens collected at "The Granites" in the Northern Territory. In 2000, David Edward Albrecht and Symon transferred the species to the genus Senna as S. sericea in the Journal of the Adelaide Botanic Gardens. The specific epithet (sericea) means "silky".

== Distribution and habitat ==
Senna sericea grows on gravelly or rocky hills in the western parts of central Northern Territory and in arid parts of Western Australia.
