= Senna procumbens =

Scientific classification
- Kingdom: Plantae
- Clade: Tracheophytes
- Clade: Angiosperms
- Clade: Eudicots
- Clade: Rosids
- Order: Fabales
- Family: Fabaceae
- Subfamily: Caesalpinioideae
- Genus: Senna
- Species: S. procumbens

Binomial name
- Senna procumbens Randell

Species of legume

Senna procumbens is a species of flowering plant in the family Fabaceae and is endemic to the Northern Territory in Australia. It is a herbaceous perennial or undershrub with pinnate leaves with two or three pairs of lance-shaped to narrowly elliptic leaflets, and groups of five to eight yellow flowers arranged in upper leaf axils.

== Description ==
Senna procumbens is a prostrate or low-lying, mostly glabrous, herbaceous perennial or undershrub. Its leaves are pinnate, 50–80 mm (2.0–3.1 in) long including a petiole 10–12 mm (0.39–0.47 in) long, with five to eight pairs of lance-shaped to narrowly elliptic leaflets, 40–50 mm (1.6–2.0 in) long and 10–15 mm (0.39–0.59 in) wide, spaced 8–12 mm (0.31–0.47 in) apart. There are hair-like glands between each pair of leaflets. The flowers are yellow and arranged in groups of five to eight in upper leaf axils on a peduncle 30–60 mm (1.2–2.4 in) long, each flower on a pedicel 15–20 mm (0.59–0.79 in) long. The petals are 11–13 mm (0.43–0.51 in) long and there are ten fertile stamens, the anthers of differing lengths between 4 and 5 mm (0.16 and 0.20 in) long. Flowering occurs from January to June, and the fruit is a flat pod 50–70 mm (2.0–2.8 in) long and about 8 mm (0.31 in) wide.

== Taxonomy ==
Senna procumbens was first formally described in 1989 by Barbara Rae Randell in the Journal of the Adelaide Botanic Garden. The specific epithet (procumbens) means "procumbent".

== Distribution and habitat ==
Senna procumbens grows among tall grasses in swamps or in forest or woodland in sandy soil. It is only known from the Pine Creek area of the Northern Territory.
