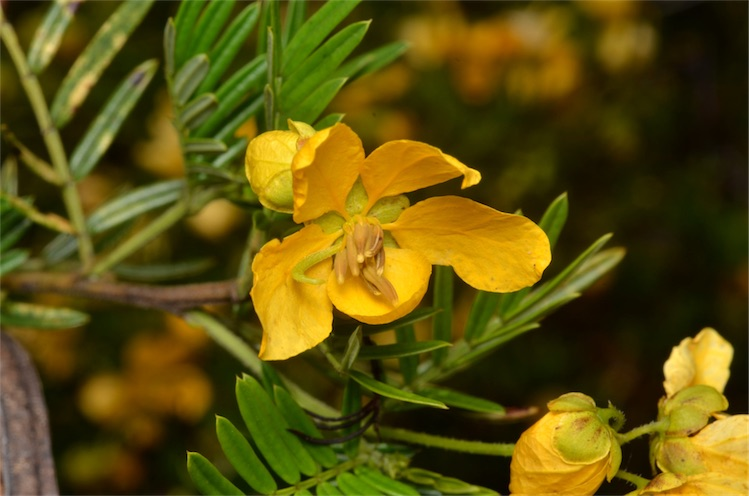

Scientific classification
- Kingdom: Plantae
- Clade: Tracheophytes
- Clade: Angiosperms
- Clade: Eudicots
- Clade: Rosids
- Order: Fabales
- Family: Fabaceae
- Subfamily: Caesalpinioideae
- Genus: Senna
- Species: S. aciphylla

Binomial name
- Senna aciphylla (Benth. ex A.Gray) Randell

Synonyms
- Cassia aciphylla Benth. ex A.Gray; Cassia australis var. revoluta (F.Muell.) Benth.; Cassia revoluta F.Muell.; Cassia revoluta F.Muell. isonym

= Senna aciphylla =

Sprawling senna

Species of legume

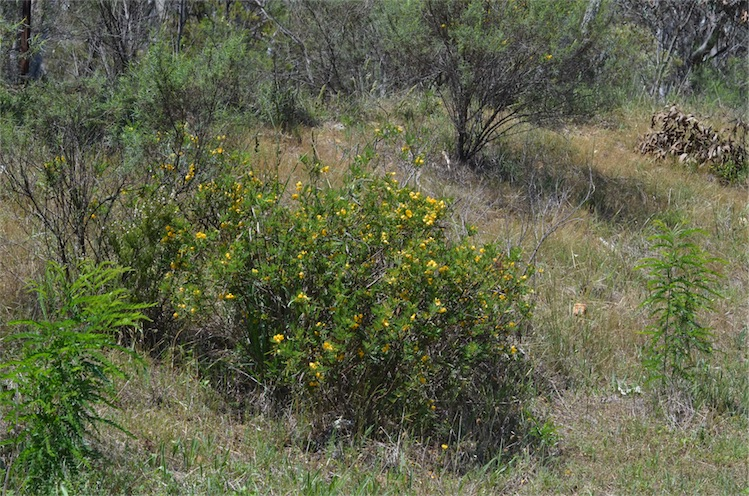
Habit in Canberra

Senna aciphylla, commonly known as sprawling senna or Australian senna, is a species of flowering plant in the family Fabaceae and is endemic to eastern Australia. It is a sprawling shrub with pinnate leaves with eight to twelve pairs of linear to narrowly elliptic leaflets, and yellow flowers in pairs or groups of three.

== Description ==
Senna aciphylla is an erect or sprawling shrub that typically grows to a height of up to 3 m (9.8 ft). Its leaves are pinnate, 30–50 mm (1.2–2.0 in) long on a petiole usually 2–5 mm (0.079–0.197 in) long, with four to eight pairs of linear or narrowly elliptic leaflets 20–25 mm (0.79–0.98 in) long and 1–4 mm (0.039–0.157 in) wide. The edges of the leaflets are usually rolled under, the end of each almost sharply-pointed and there is a stalked gland between each pair of leaflets. The flowers are yellow and arranged in upper leaf axils in pairs or groups of three on a peduncle 20–50 mm (0.79–1.97 in) long, each flower on a pedicel 10–15 mm (0.39–0.59 in) long. The petals are 10–15 mm (0.39–0.59 in) long and there are ten fertile stamens, the longest anthers 4–5 mm (0.16–0.20 in) long. Flowering occurs in spring and summer, and the fruit is a linear pod 60–80 mm (2.4–3.1 in) long.

== Taxonomy ==
This species was first formally described in 1854 by Asa Gray who gave it the name Cassia aciphylla in United States Exploring Expedition from an unpublished description by George Bentham. In 1989, Barbara Rae Randell transferred the species to Senna as Senna aciphylla in the Journal of the Adelaide Botanic Garden. The specific epithet (aciphylla) means "pointed leaves".

== Distribution and habitat ==
Senna aciphylla grows in forest and rocky slopes in woodland, in south-eastern Queensland, on the coast, ranges and western slopes of New South Wales, the Australian Capital Territory, and in eastern Victoria.
