= Senna cladophylla =

Scientific classification
- Kingdom: Plantae
- Clade: Tracheophytes
- Clade: Angiosperms
- Clade: Eudicots
- Clade: Rosids
- Order: Fabales
- Family: Fabaceae
- Subfamily: Caesalpinioideae
- Genus: Senna
- Species: S. cladophylla

Binomial name
- Senna cladophylla (W.Fitzg.) Randell

Synonyms
- Cassia cladophylla W.Fitzg.; Cassia oligoclada auct. non F.Muell.: Symon, D.E.

Species of legume

Senna cladophylla is a species of flowering plant in the family Fabaceae and native to Western Australia and the Northern Territory. It is a perennial herb or undershrub with pinnate leaves with two or three pairs of broadly elliptic leaflets, and yellow flowers arranged in pairs, with ten fertile stamens in each flower.

== Description ==
Senna cladophylla is a spreading, perennial herb or subshrub that typically grows to a height of up to 30 cm (12 in), its stems and foliage softly-hairy. The leaves are pinnate, 30–50 mm (1.2–2.0 in) long on a petiole 5–8 mm (0.20–0.31 in) long with two or three pairs of broadly elliptic leaflets 12–15 mm (0.47–0.59 in) long and 8–10 mm (0.31–0.39 in) wide. There are persistent heart-shaped or ear-shaped stipules at the base of the petioles. The flowers are yellow and arranged in pairs in leaf axils on a peduncle 25–30 mm (0.98–1.18 in) long, each flower on a pedicel 10–12 mm (0.39–0.47 in) long. The petals are 6–8 mm (0.24–0.31 in) long and there are ten fertile stamens, the anthers 4–5 mm (0.16–0.20 in) long and of different lengths. Flowering occurs from February to July, and the fruit is a flattened, curved pod 25–40 mm (0.98–1.57 in) long.

== Taxonomy ==
This species was first formally described in 1918 by William Vincent Fitzgerald who gave it the name Cassia cladophylla in the Journal and Proceedings of the Royal Society of Western Australia. In 1998, Barbara Rae Randell and Bryan Alwyn Barlow transferred the species to Senna as Senna cladophylla in the Flora of Australia. The specific epithet (cladophylla) refers to the individual leaves resembling a short, leafy branch.

== Distribution and habitat ==
Senna cladophylla grows in moist, rocky soil in the Kimberley region of northern Western Australia and in Arnhem Land in the Northern Territory.
