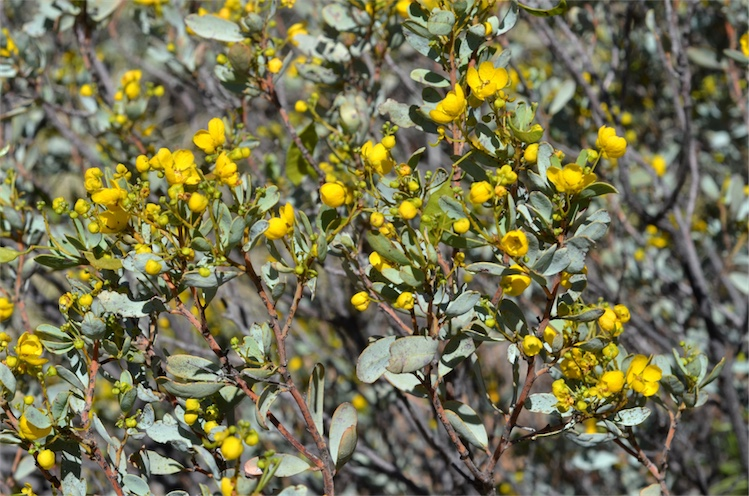
- Subspecies alicia in the West MacDonnell National Park

Scientific classification
- Kingdom: Plantae
- Clade: Tracheophytes
- Clade: Angiosperms
- Clade: Eudicots
- Clade: Rosids
- Order: Fabales
- Family: Fabaceae
- Subfamily: Caesalpinioideae
- Genus: Senna
- Species: S. artemisioides

Binomial name
- Senna artemisioides (Gaudich. ex DC.) Randell

Synonyms
- Cassia artemisiaefolia R.Br. orth. var.; Cassia artemisioides Gaudich. ex DC.

= Senna artemisioides =

Silver cassia

Species of plant

Senna artemisioides, commonly known as silver cassia, is a species of flowering plant in the family Fabaceae and is endemic to Australia, where it is found in all mainland states and territories. It is a shrub with pinnate leaves, the leaflets variable, yellow flowers mostly occurring in winter, and linear pods. Six subspecies, four hybrid subspecies and two subspecies named but not yet described are accepted by the Australian Plant Census.

== Description ==
Senna artemisioides is a shrub that typically grows to a height of .15–3 m (5.9 in – 9 ft 10.1 in) high and has pinnate leaves, the leaflets in pairs of one to eight, with a sessile gland between the lowest pair of leaflets. The leaves have tiny, triangular stipules, but fall off as the leaves mature. The flowers are yellow and borne in clusters of two to fifteen in leaf axils on a peduncle up to about 15 mm (0.59 in) long, the petals 5–10 mm (0.20–0.39 in) long, each flower on a pedicel up to about 10 mm (0.39 in) long. The sepals are 6–8 mm (0.24–0.31 in) long and greenish, the petals mostly 7–10 mm (0.28–0.39 in) long. There are ten fertile stamens, the anthers 4–5 mm (0.16–0.20 in) long. The fruit is a glabrous, linear pod 5–10 cm (2.0–3.9 in) long, 8–15 mm (0.31–0.59 in) wide.

== Taxonomy and naming ==
This species was first described in 1825 by Augustin Pyramus de Candolle, who gave it the name Cassia artemisioides in his Prodromus Systematis Naturalis Regni Vegetabilis, from an unpublished description by Charles Gaudichaud-Beaupré of specimens collected by Charles Fraser. In 1989 Barbara Rae Randell raised the genus Senna in the Journal of the Adelaide Botanic Gardens, and transferred C. artemisioides to the new genus as S. artemisioides. The Latin specific epithet (artemisioides) means "resembling Artemisia", a different group of plants often known as wormwood.

Senna artemisioides is known as wormwood senna in the U.K., and as silver senna in the U.S., where it is an introduced species.

As of May 2023, the names of six subspecies of S. artemisioides are accepted by the Australian Plant Census:

- Senna artemisioides subsp. alicia Randell (N.T., S.A., Qld., N.S.W.) has cylindrical petioles, the leaves with up to three pairs of flat, silky-hairy, egg-shaped leaflets at least 2 mm (0.079 in) wide and held vertically, exposing the lower surface. It has clusters of six to fifteen flowers with petals 8–10 mm (0.31–0.39 in) long, with ten fertile stamens and pods about 70 mm (2.8 in) long and 15–25 mm (0.59–0.98 in) wide.
- Senna artemisioides subsp. filifolia, Randell commonly known as desert cassia, broom bush or punty bush, (W.A., N.T., S.A., Qld., N.S.W., Vic.) has cylindrical petioles that are more than 15 mm (0.59 in) long, the leaves with up to four pairs of cylindrical leaflets 20–40 mm (0.79–1.57 in) long. It has clusters of three to ten flowers with petals 7–10 mm (0.28–0.39 in) long, with ten fertile stamens and pods 20–70 mm (0.79–2.76 in) long and 10–12 mm (0.39–0.47 in) wide. Flowering mostly occurs in winter.
- Senna artemisioides subsp. helmsii (Symon) Randell (previously known as Cassia helmsii Symon) – commonly known as blunt-leaved cassia or crinkled cassia (W.A., N.T., S.A., Qld., N.S.W.) has cylindrical petioles, the leaves with flat, woolly-hairy, egg-shaped leaflets at least 2 mm (0.079 in) wide. It has clusters of four to ten flowers with petals 8–10 mm (0.31–0.39 in) long, with ten fertile stamens and pods 50–65 mm (2.0–2.6 in) long and 15–20 mm (0.59–0.79 in) wide. Flowering occurs in winter.
- Senna artemisioides subsp. oligophylla (F.Muell.) Randell – blunt-leaved cassia (W.A., N.T., S.A., Qld., N.S.W.) has cylindrical petioles 5–15 mm (0.20–0.59 in) long, the leaflets egg-shaped, 10–40 mm (0.39–1.57 in) long and 10–20 mm (0.39–0.79 in) wide. It has clusters of four to twelve flowers with petals 8–10 mm (0.31–0.39 in) long, with ten fertile stamens and pods about 70 mm (2.8 in) long and 15–25 mm (0.59–0.98 in) wide. Flowering occurs in winter.
- Senna artemisioides subsp. quadrifolia Randell (N.T., S.A., Qld.) has cylindrical petioles 15–25 mm (0.59–0.98 in) long, the leaflets narrowly elliptic, 20–50 mm (0.79–1.97 in) long and 2–10 mm (0.079–0.394 in) wide. It has clusters of four to eight flowers with petals 8–10 mm (0.31–0.39 in) long, with ten fertile stamens and pods about 70 mm (2.8 in) long and 15 mm (0.59 in) wide. Flowering occurs in winter.
- Senna artemisioides subsp. zygophylla (Benth.) Randell (S.A., Qld., N.S.W., Vic.) has cylindrical petioles, the leaves with flat, glabrous, linear to elliptic leaflets more than five times as long as broad. It has clusters of three to five flowers with petals 6–9 mm (0.24–0.35 in) long, with ten fertile stamens and pods 20–70 mm (0.79–2.76 in) long and 10–12 mm (0.39–0.47 in) wide. Flowering occurs in winter.

Four hybrid subspecies are also recognised by the Australian Plant Census:

- Senna artemisioides (Gaudich. ex DC.) Randell subsp. × artemisioides (previously known as Cassia circinnata Benth.) (W.A., N.T., S.A., Qld., N.S.W., Vic.) has cylindrical petioles that are less than 15 mm (0.59 in) long, the leaves with three to eight pairs of cylindrical, hairy leaflets 15–25 mm (0.59–0.98 in) long, the edges rolled upwards so that the upper surface is not visible. It has clusters of four to twelve flowers with petals 7–10 mm (0.28–0.39 in) long, with ten fertile stamens and pods 40–80 mm (1.6–3.1 in) long and 6–10 mm (0.24–0.39 in) wide. Flowering mostly occurs in winter.
- Senna artemisioides subsp. × coriacea (Benth.) Randell (previously known as Cassia sturtii var. coriacea Benth.) (W.A., N.T., S.A., Qld., N.S.W., Vic.) has cylindrical petioles, the leaves flat with up to six pairs of linear to elliptic leaflets that are sparsely hairy and glaucous, the leaflet held horizontally. It has clusters of six to ten flowers with petals 5–8 mm (0.20–0.31 in) long, with ten fertile stamens and pods 30–50 mm (1.2–2.0 in) long and 10–12 mm (0.39–0.47 in) wide. Flowering occurs in winter.
- Senna artemisioides subsp. × petiolaris Randell – woody cassia (W.A., N.T., S.A., Qld., N.S.W., Vic.) has petioles that are laterally compressed. It has clusters of two to ten flowers with petals 7–10 mm (0.28–0.39 in) long, with ten fertile stamens and pods 40–80 mm (1.6–3.1 in) long and 6–10 mm (0.24–0.39 in) wide. Flowering usually occurs in winter.
- Senna artemisioides subsp. × sturtii Randell (previously known as Cassia sturtii R.Br.) (W.A., N.T., S.A., Qld., N.S.W.) has cylindrical petioles, the leaves flat with linear to elliptic leaflets that are densely silky- or woolly-hairy, but never glaucous. It has clusters of four to eight flowers with petals 7–10 mm (0.28–0.39 in) long, with ten fertile stamens and pods 60–70 mm (2.4–2.8 in) long and 9–12 mm (0.35–0.47 in) wide. Flowering occurs in winter.

A further two subspecies are named, but as of May 2023, not formally described:

- Senna artemisioides subsp. James Range (P.L.Latz 18528) NT Herbarium (N.T.)
- Senna artemisioides subsp. Kuyunba (B.Pitts 113) NT Herbarium (N.T.)

== Distribution ==
Silver cassia is endemic to Australia, occurring in all mainland states and territories, and has been introduced to California, the Canary Islands, Cyprus, India, Iraq, Spain and Zimbabwe.

== Ecology ==
S. artemisioides is a recognized larval food plant for several species of butterfly and moth, including the small grass yellow, icilius blue, twig looper, blotched satin moth and bag-shelter moth. Seed dispersal is aided by ants which eat the arils.

== Use in horticulture ==
Senna artemisioides adapts to a wide range of climatic conditions, but is susceptible to frost, especially when young. It prefers dry, well-drained sites with full sun. As an ornamental plant, it is propagated readily from seed, which should first be briefly immersed in boiling water.

This species has gained the Royal Horticultural Society's Award of Garden Merit.

== Images of subspecies ==
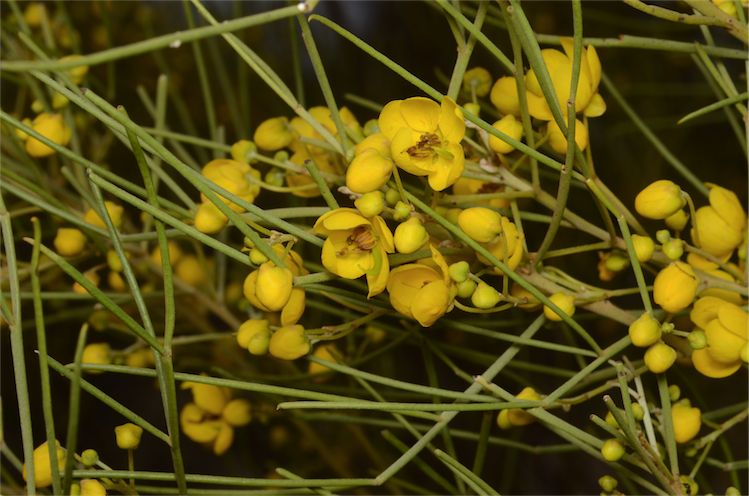
Subsp. filifolia in Currawinya National Park

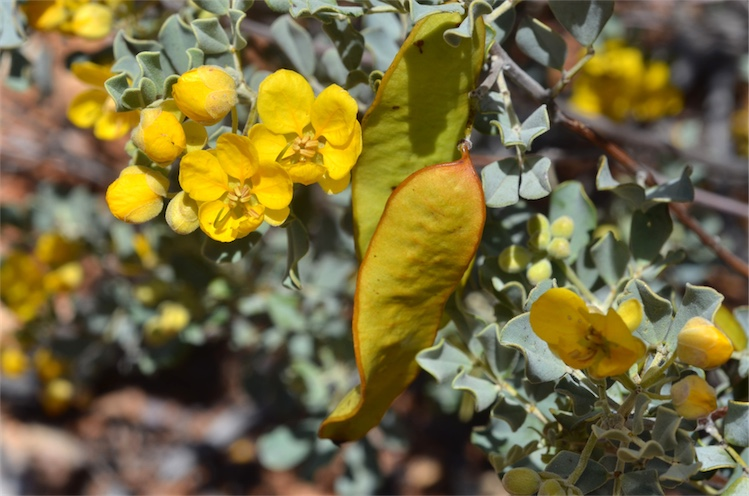
Subsp. helmsii in West MacDonnell National Park

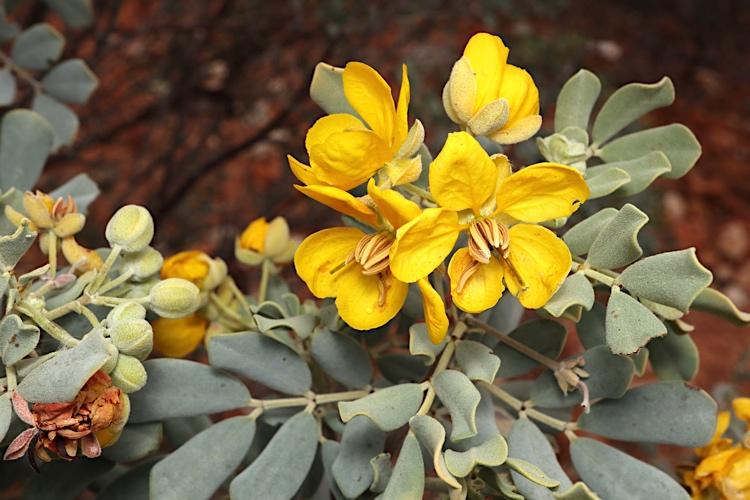
Subsp. oligophylla near Winton

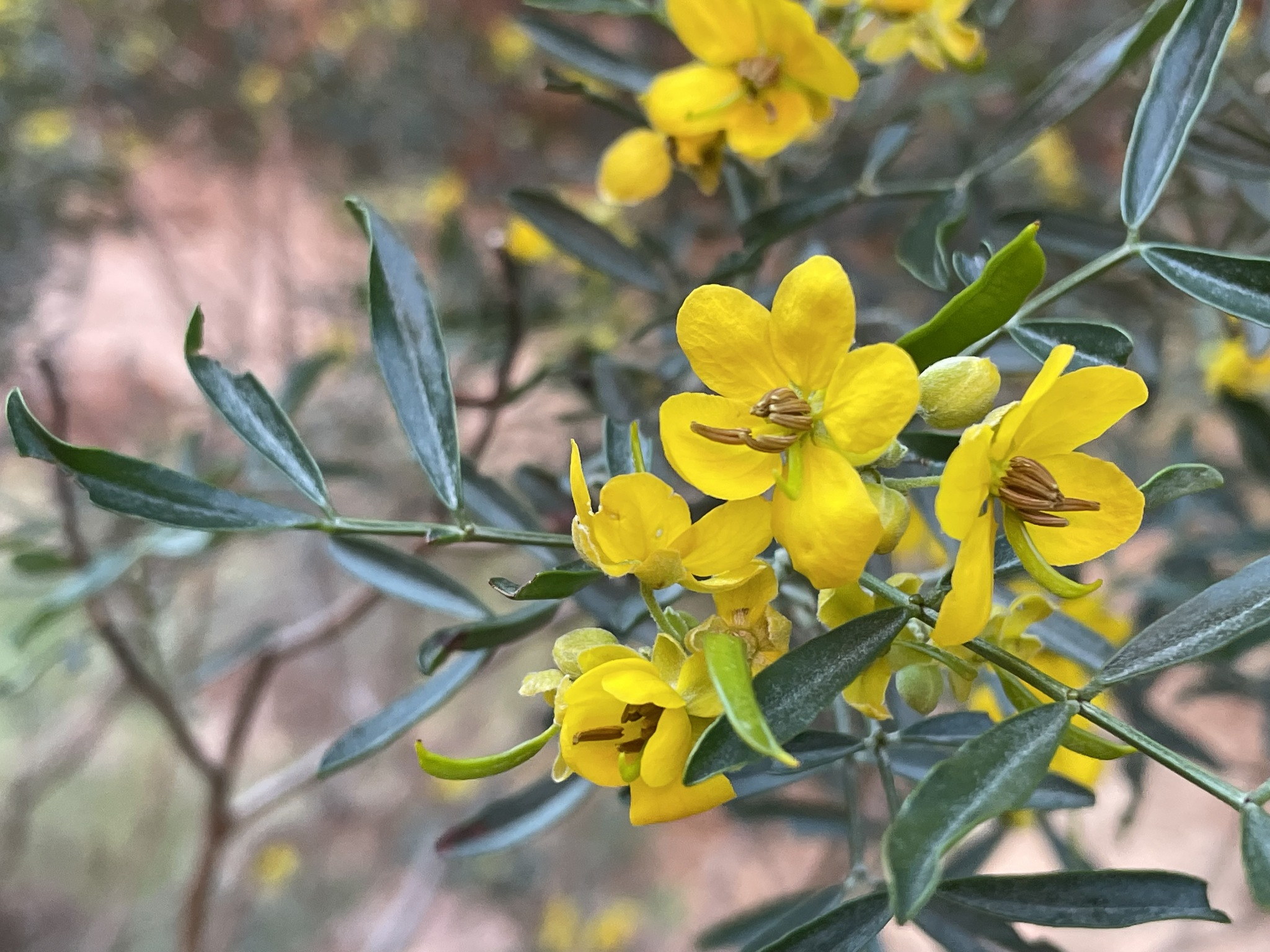
Subsp. quadrifaria near Kata Tjuta

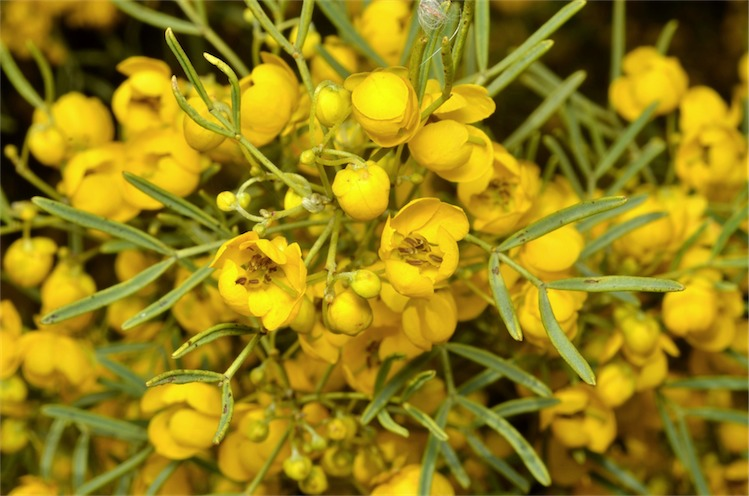
Subsp. zygophylla between Balranald and Robinvale

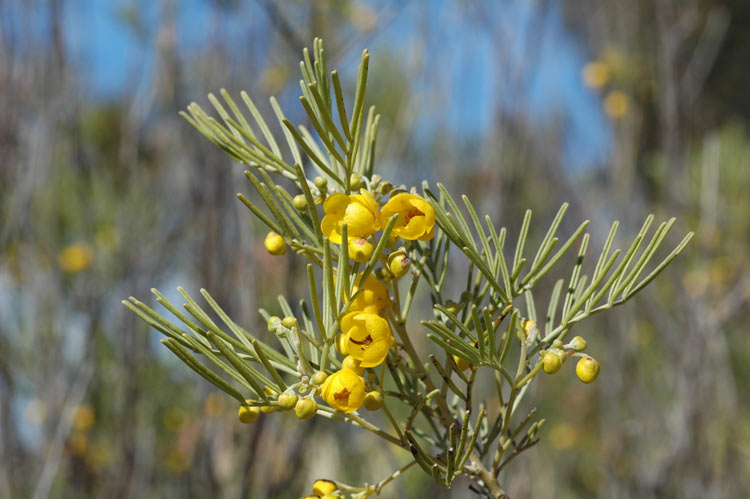
Subsp. × artemisioides in the Australian National Botanic Gardens

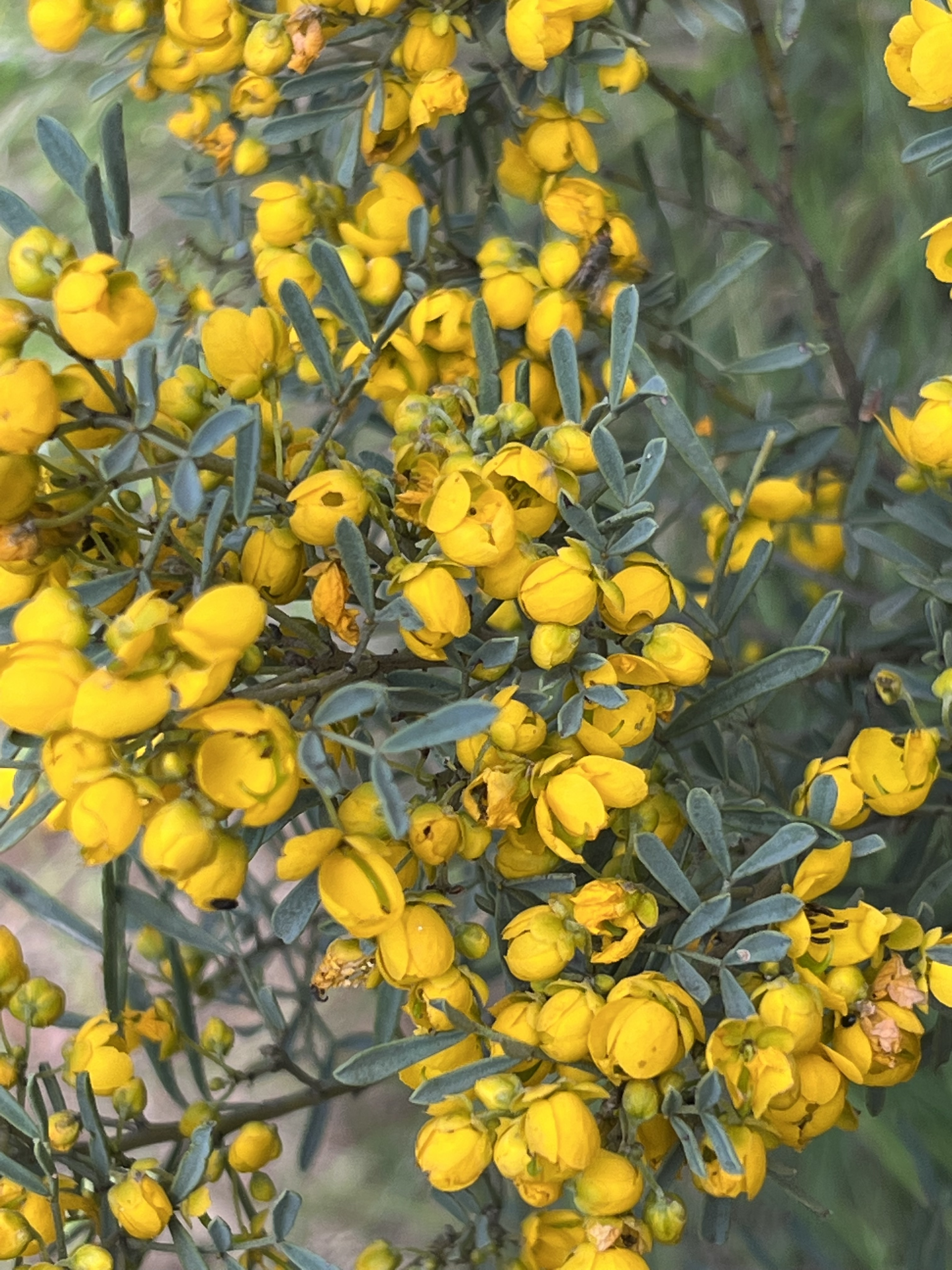
Subsp. × coriacea in South Australia

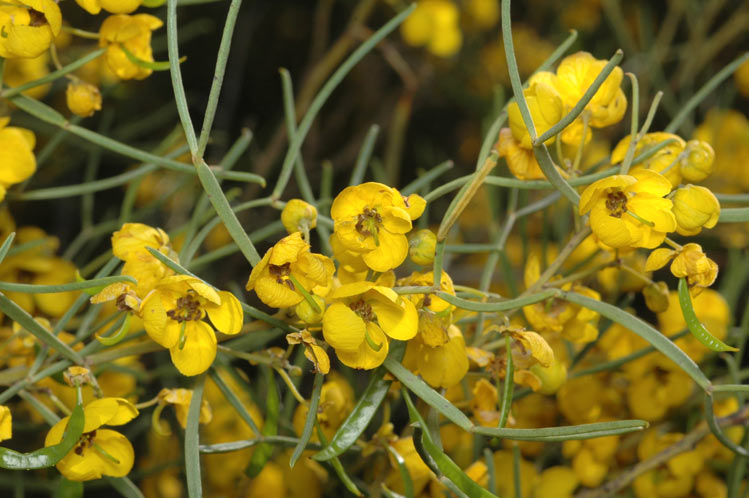
Subsp. x petiolaris between Narrandera and Morundah

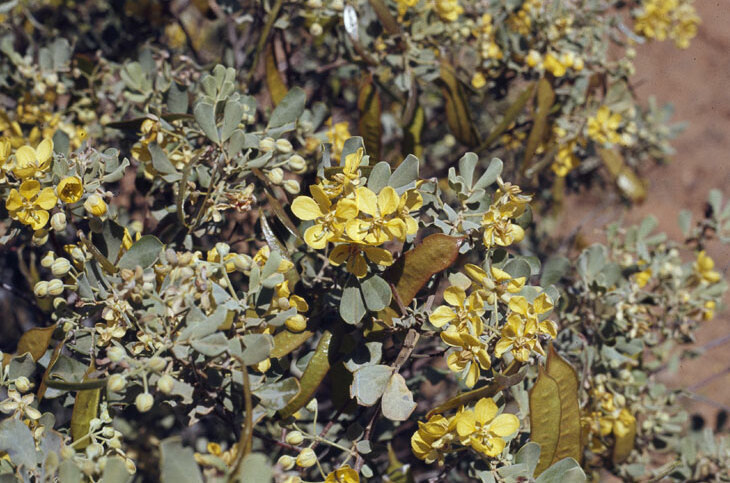
Subsp. x sturtii South of Leigh Creek
