= Eurema smilax =

Small grass yellow

Scientific classification
- Kingdom: Animalia
- Phylum: Arthropoda
- Clade: Pancrustacea
- Class: Insecta
- Order: Lepidoptera
- Family: Pieridae
- Genus: Eurema
- Species: E. smilax

Binomial name
- Eurema smilax (Donovan, 1805)

Synonyms
- Papilio smilax Donovan, 1805; Terias ingana Wallace, 1867; Terias parvula Herrich-Schäffer, 1869; Terias varius Miskin, 1889; Terias casta T.P. Lucas, 1892; Terias smilax

Species of butterfly

Eurema smilax, the small grass yellow, is a small pierid butterfly species found in Australia, with some additional records from India, Indonesia and Niger.

The wingspan is about 30 mm.

The larvae mostly feed on plants of the Senna and Neptunia genera.

== Taxonomy ==
The species was first described by Edward Donovan in 1805.

== Description ==
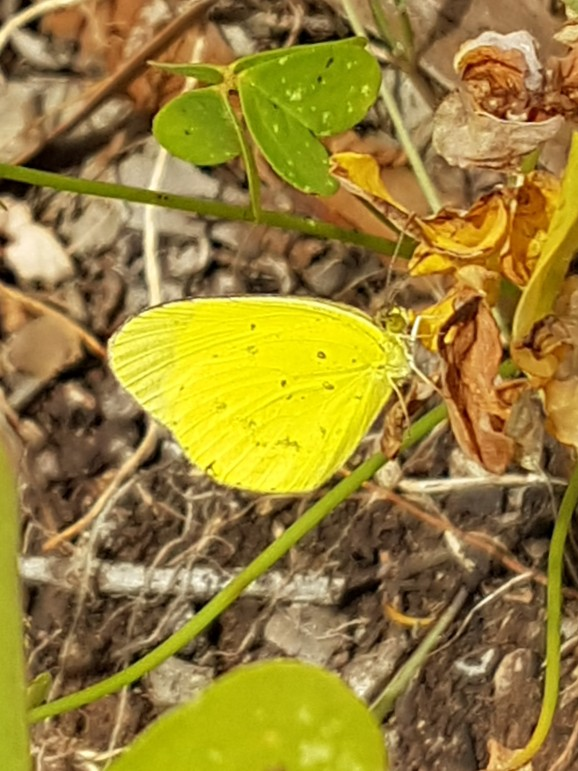
Winter form

Eurema smilax adults have a wingspan of 30–34 mm, with females being slightly larger than males. They are yellow, with black tips on the upper surface of the forewings. This colouration can vary depending on flight period. In southern Australia, the summer flying forms are usually pale yellow, with few or no brown markings on the wing undersides. The winter forms are a brighter yellow, with pronounced brown markings on the wing undersides. The males are generally a brighter yellow than the females.

The eggs are initially white, later turning yellowish. They are spindle-shaped, with a height of about 1.2 mm, and laid singly on a host plant. They hatch in about 7–11 days during spring.

The caterpillar is initially pale yellow, soon becoming greenish. Third and fourth instars develop a darker dorsal line and a yellow lateral line. Mature larvae are 18–22 mm long. All larval stages have specialised hairs which secrete poison, visible at the ends of the hairs as clear droplets.

Pupae are green, about 15 mm long, and attached to the host plant via a cremaster and central silken girdle. The head may be pointing either upwards or downwards. The pupal period lasts about 8–13 days.

== Distribution and Host Plants ==
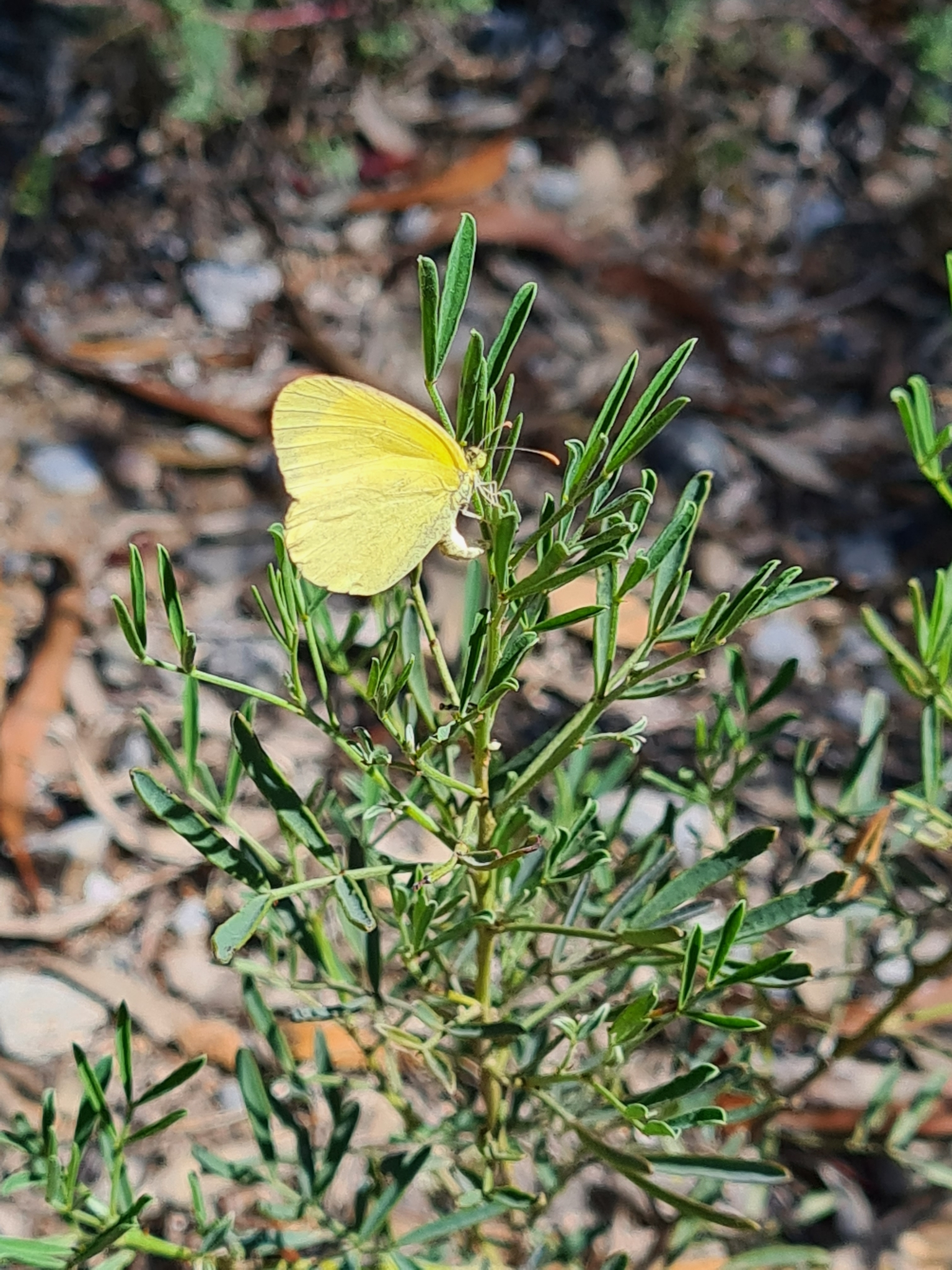
Eurema smilax (summer form) laying eggs on Senna artemisioides ssp. coriacea

This butterfly can be found over the whole of mainland Australia, with occasional records from Kangaroo Island, Lord Howe Island and Tasmania. There are also records from India, Java and Niger.

E. smilax has been recorded using the following species as larval host plants:

- Senna acclinis
- Senna coronilloides
- Senna gaudichaudii
- Senna artemisioides
- Senna odorata
- Senna petiolaris
- Senna surattensis
- Senna alata
- Senna auriculata
- Cassia fistula
- Neptunia gracilis
- Neptunia monosperma
- Paraserianthes lophantha

== Behaviour ==
E. smilax exhibits both migrant and vagrant habits. In South Australia, they will fly south from northern breeding grounds in spring, aided by hot northerly winds. During these migrations they fly in a steady, direct manner below head height, with the females being gravid and fertile. The females seem to prefer laying eggs on small plants growing in full sun.
