= Boarmia =

Boarmia may refer to two different taxonomic genera of geometrid moths:

- Boarmia Treitschke, 1825, a taxonomic synonym for Hypomecis
- Boarmia Stephens, 1829, a taxonomic synonym for Ectropis
