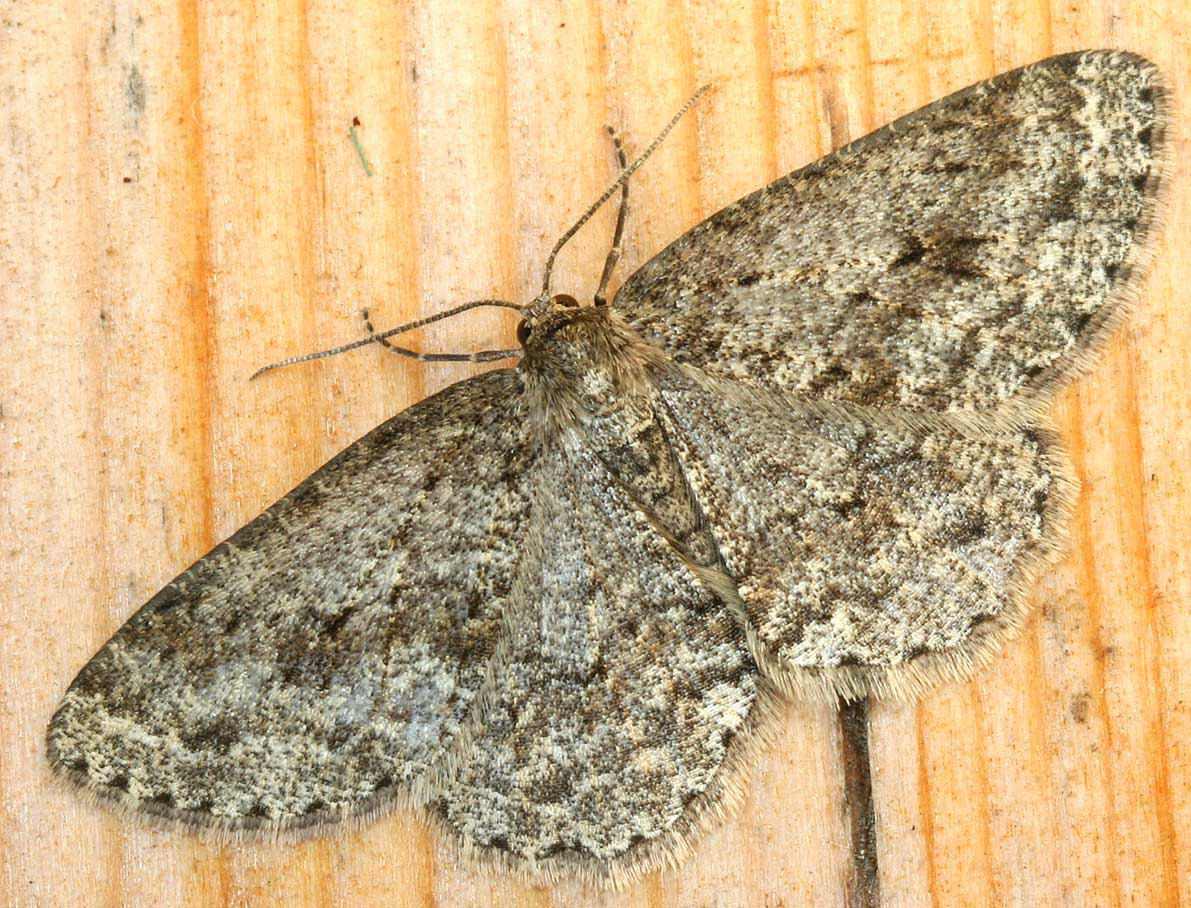
- Photo courtesy of Entomart.be
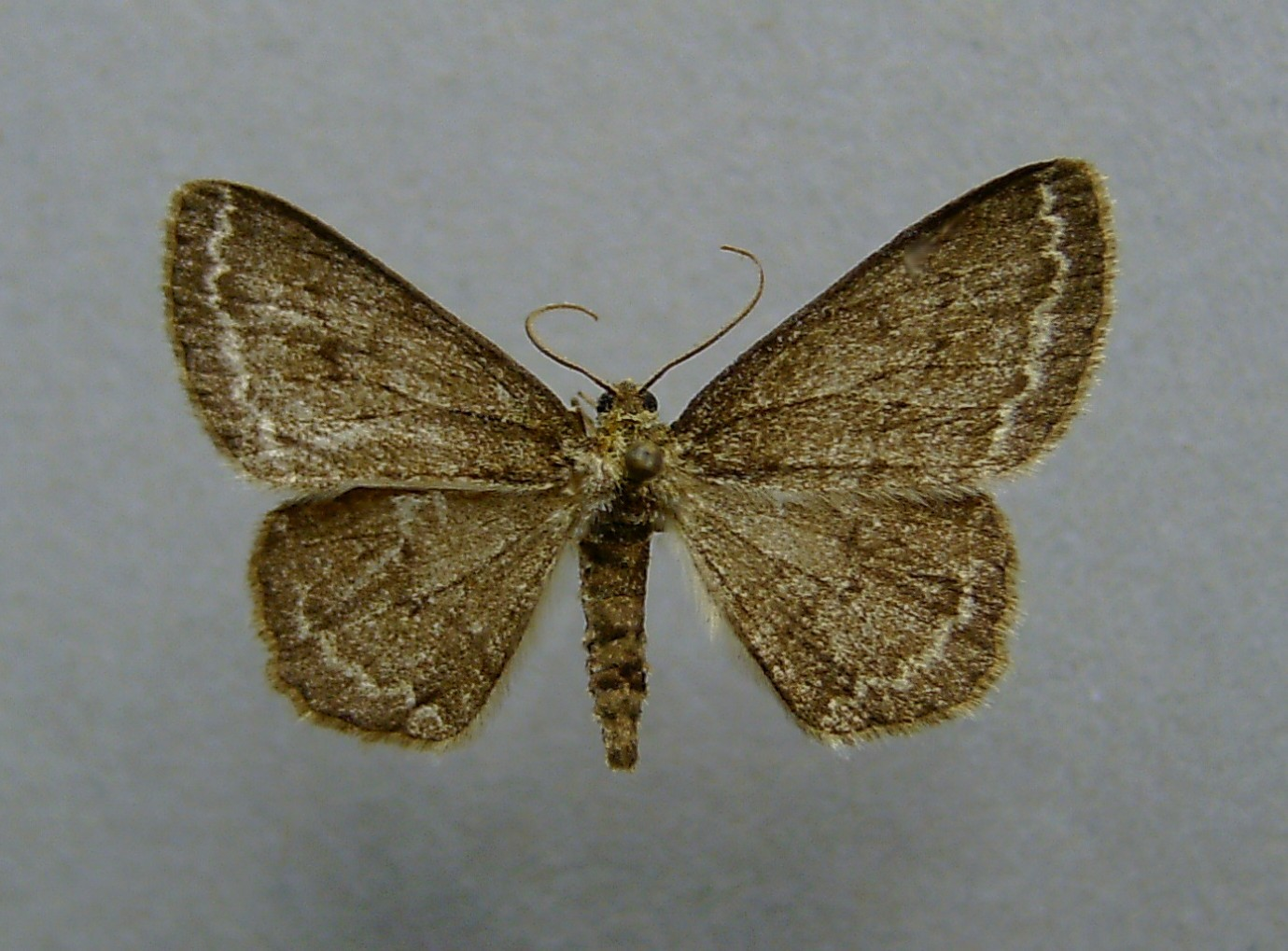
- Female

Scientific classification
- Kingdom: Animalia
- Phylum: Arthropoda
- Clade: Pancrustacea
- Class: Insecta
- Order: Lepidoptera
- Family: Geometridae
- Genus: Ectropis
- Species: E. crepuscularia

Binomial name
- Ectropis crepuscularia (Denis & Schiffermüller, 1775)

Synonyms
- Ectropis bistortata Goeze, 1781

= Engrailed (moth) =

Ectropis crepuscularia

Species of moth

The engrailed and small engrailed (Ectropis crepuscularia) are moths of the family Geometridae found from the British Isles through central and eastern Europe to the Russian Far East and Kazakhstan. The western Mediterranean and Asia Minor and the Caucasus represent the southern limit of the distribution (with the Balkan countries). In the north, the distribution area ends at the Arctic Circle. It also occurs in North America. Debate exists as to whether they make up one species, or whether E. crepuscularia actually refers only to the small engrailed, with the engrailed proper being separable as E. bistortata.

The ground colour of the wings is buff or grey, variably marked with darker fascia and a pale postdiscal crossline. The darker markings are not usually as strong as in the rather similar willow beauty. Melanic forms occur fairly frequently. The wingspan is 38–45 mm (1.5–1.8 in) . One or two broods are produced each year. In the British Isles, the adults can be seen at any time between March and August; this time range may vary in other parts of this moth's range. The species flies at night and is attracted to light.

The greyish caterpillar is truly polyphagous, feeding on a huge range of plants. As a caterpillar, the species is known as the saddleback looper. The species overwinters as a pupa.

== Recorded food plants ==
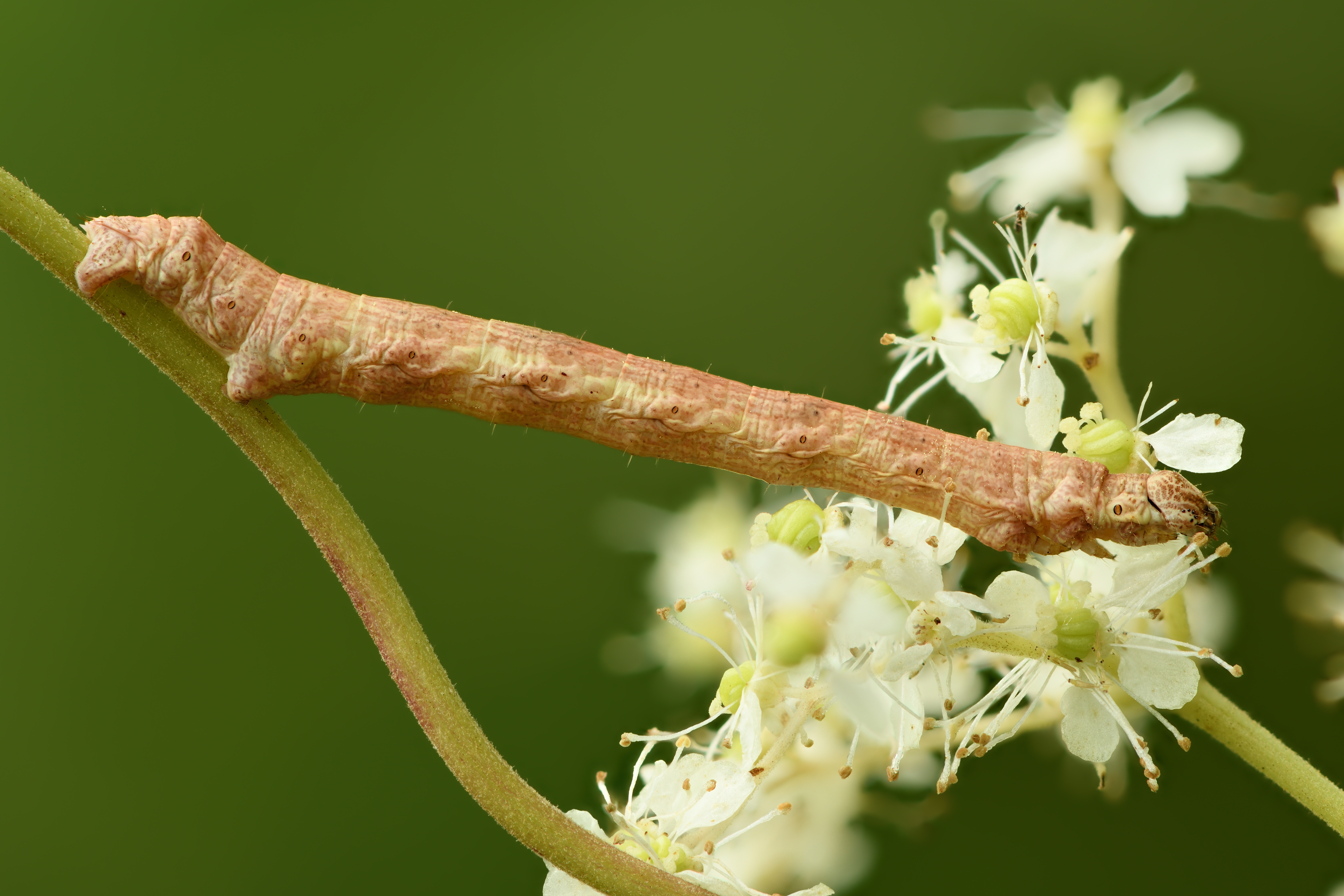
Caterpillar on meadowsweet

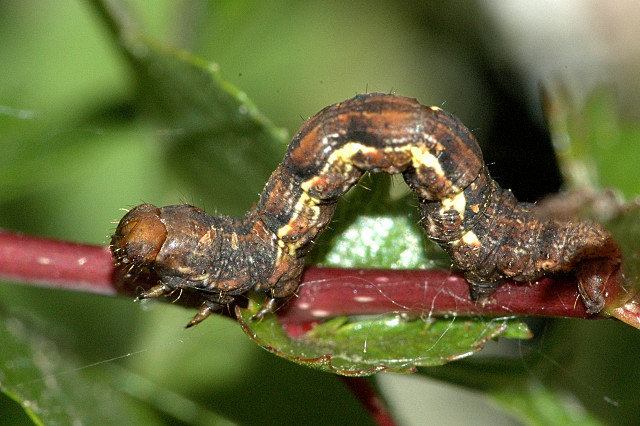
Caterpillar

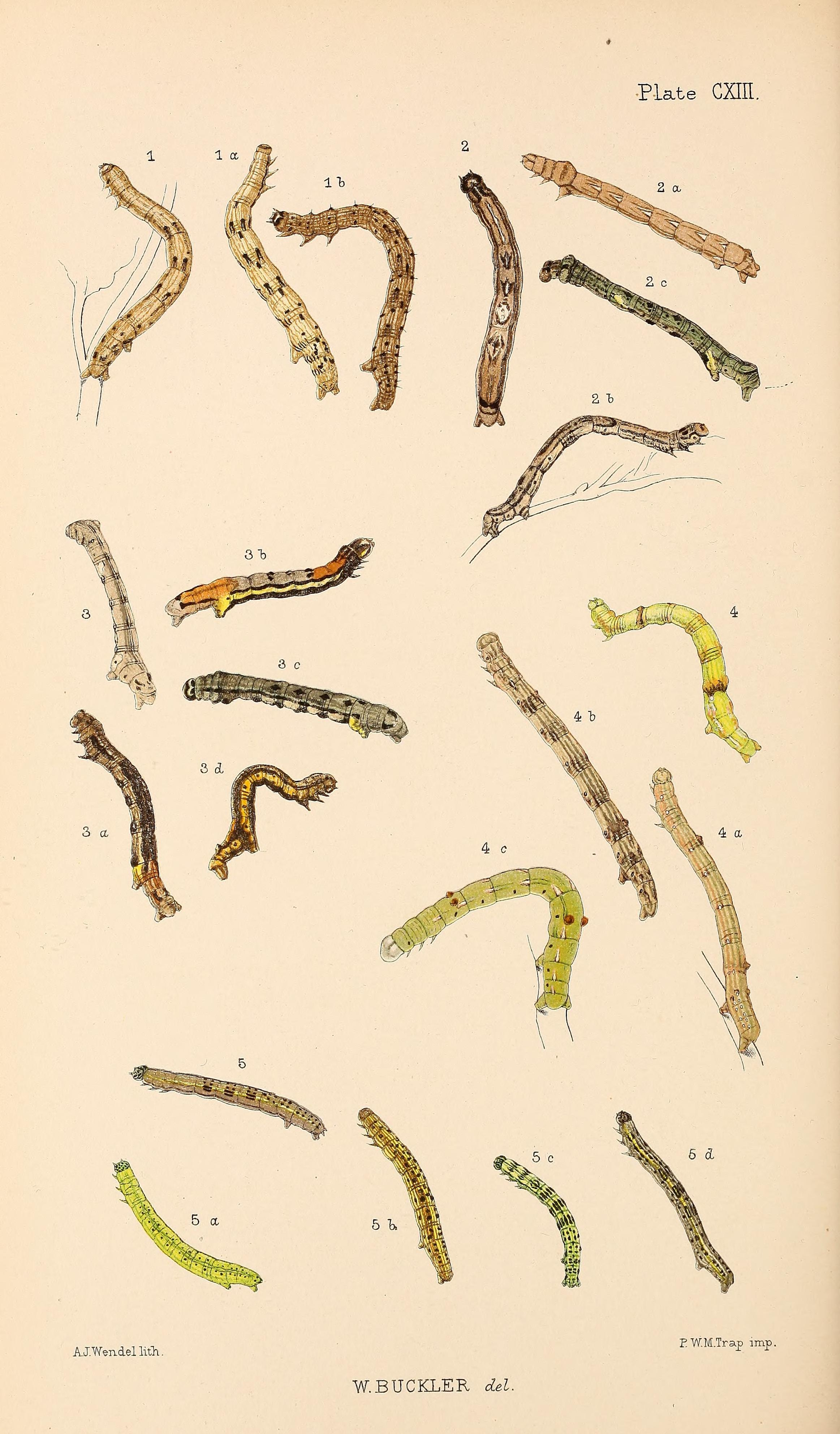
2,2a,2b,2c Larvae in various stages

- Acer, maple
- Aconitum, monkshood
- Alnus, alder
- Aquilegia, columbine
- Betula, birch
- Calluna vulgaris, heather
- Camellia japonica, Japanese camellia
- Castanea, chestnut
- Centaurea, star thistle
- Cirsium arvense, creeping thistle
- Cornus, dogwood
- Daphniphyllum
- Diervilla, bush honeysuckle
- Frangula, alder buckthorn
- Fraxinus, ash
- Genista, broom
- Glycine, soybean
- Hypericum maculatum, imperforate St. John's wort
- Ilex, holly
- Juglans, walnut
- Larix, Larch
- Lindera, spice bush
- Lonicera, honeysuckle
- Lythrum salicaria, purple loosestrife
- Malus, apple
- Philadelphus, mock-orange
- Picea, spruce
- Pieris
- Pinus, pine
- Plectranthus
- Populus, poplar
- Pseudotsuga, Douglas fir
- Quercus, oak
- Ribes rubrum, redcurrant
- Rosa, rose
- Rubus idaeus, raspberry
- Rumex, dock
- Salix, willow
- Sambucus, elder
- Shepherdia canadensis, Canada buffaloberry
- Sorbus spp., rowans
- Spartina, cordgrass
- Thuja
- Trifolium, clover
- Tsuga, hemlock
- Ulmus, elm
- Vaccinium
- Zanthoxylum
