= Ectropis distinctaria =

Scientific classification
- Kingdom: Animalia
- Phylum: Arthropoda
- Clade: Pancrustacea
- Class: Insecta
- Order: Lepidoptera
- Family: Geometridae
- Genus: Ectropis
- Species: E. distinctaria

Binomial name
- Ectropis distinctaria (de Joannis, 1915)

Synonyms
- Synopsia distinctaria de Joannis, 1915

Species of moth

Ectropis distinctaria is a moth of the family Geometridae. It is found in Mauritius.

The wingspan is about 33 mm.

This species is close to Ectropis herbuloti Orhant, 2003, which had been confused with E.distinctaria until 2003
