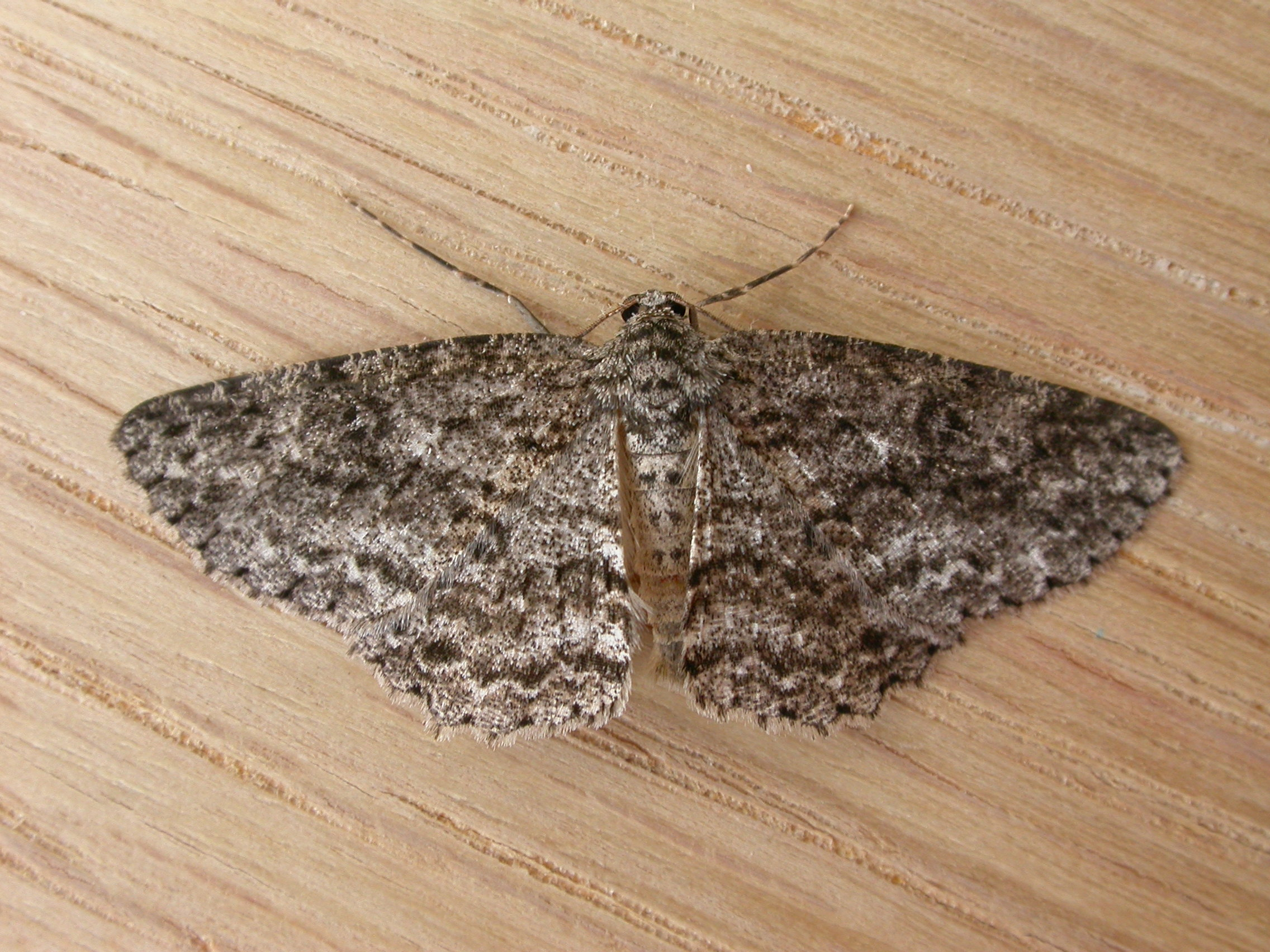

Scientific classification
- Kingdom: Animalia
- Phylum: Arthropoda
- Class: Insecta
- Order: Lepidoptera
- Family: Geometridae
- Genus: Ectropis
- Species: E. fractaria

Binomial name
- Ectropis fractaria Guenée, 1857

= Ectropis fractaria =

Species of moth

Ectropis fractaria is a moth of the family Geometridae. It is found in Australia, including Tasmania.

Hypochroma dissentanea and hypochroma dissonata are both synonyms for ectropis fractaria.
