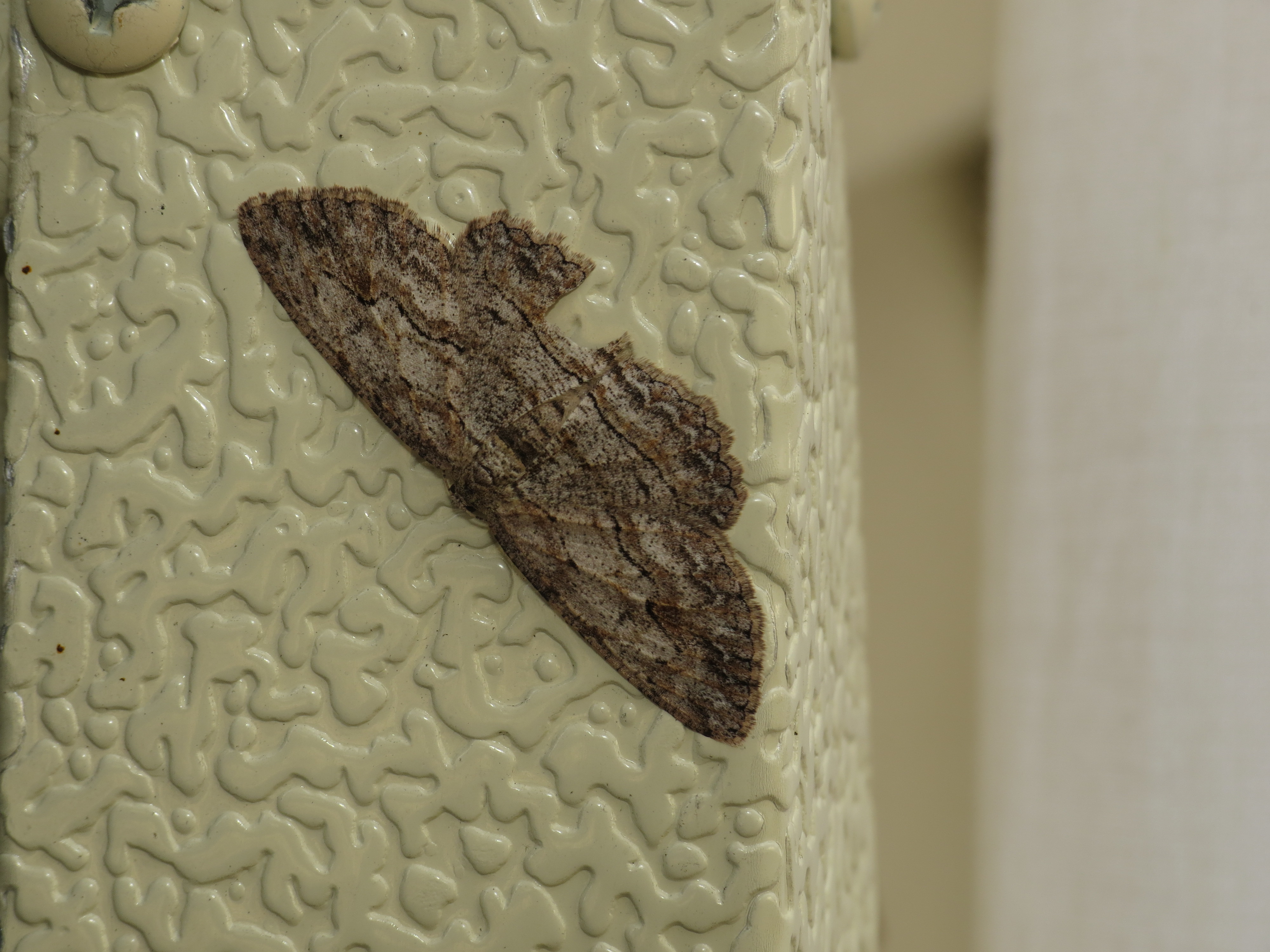

Scientific classification
- Kingdom: Animalia
- Phylum: Arthropoda
- Class: Insecta
- Order: Lepidoptera
- Family: Geometridae
- Genus: Ectropis
- Species: E. bispinaria

Binomial name
- Ectropis bispinaria Guenée, 1857

Synonyms
- Tephrosia subtinctaria

= Ectropis bispinaria =

Species of moth

Ectropis bispinaria is a moth of the family Geometridae. It is found in Australia.

The wingspan is about 30 mm for males and 40 mm for females.

The larvae feed on Dahlia pinnata, Persea americana, Rosa odorata, Citrus limon and Grevillea robusta.
