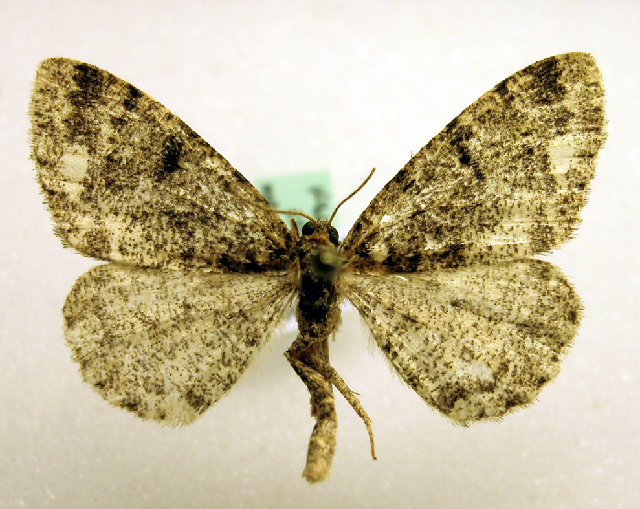

Scientific classification
- Domain: Eukaryota
- Kingdom: Animalia
- Phylum: Arthropoda
- Class: Insecta
- Order: Lepidoptera
- Family: Geometridae
- Genus: Parectropis
- Species: P. similaria

Binomial name
- Parectropis similaria (Hufnagel, 1767)

Synonyms
- Phalaena similaria Hufnagel, 1767; Ectropis similaria; Geometra extersaria Hubner, 1799; Phalaena luridata Borkhausen, 1894

= Parectropis similaria =

Species of moth

Parectropis similaria, the brindled white-spot, is a moth of the family Geometridae. The species was first described by Johann Siegfried Hufnagel in 1767. It is found in most of Europe.

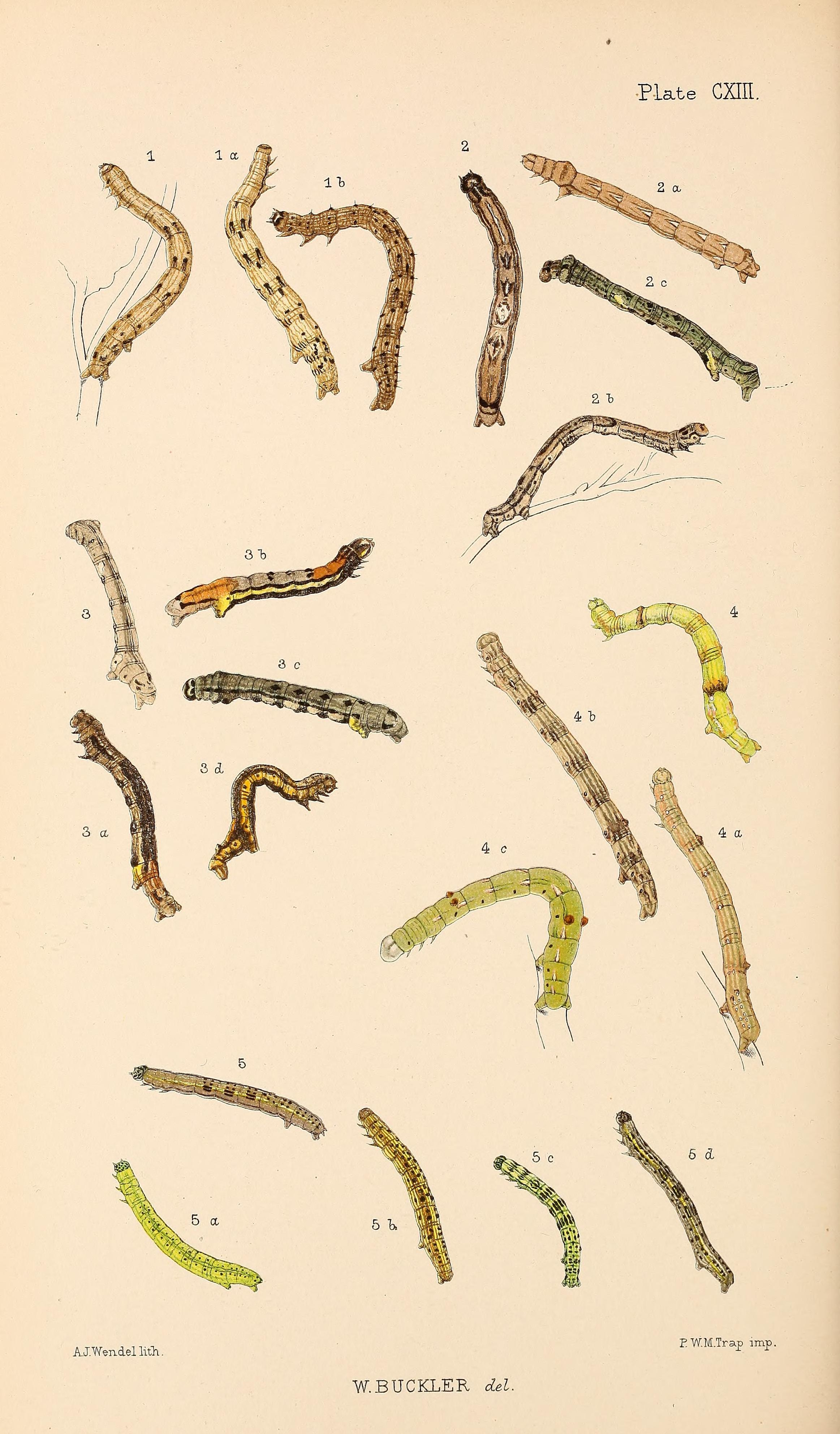
4,4a,4b,4c Larvae in various stages

Adults are on wing in May and June. The larvae feed on the foliage of Quercus and Betula species. The larvae can be found in autumn.
