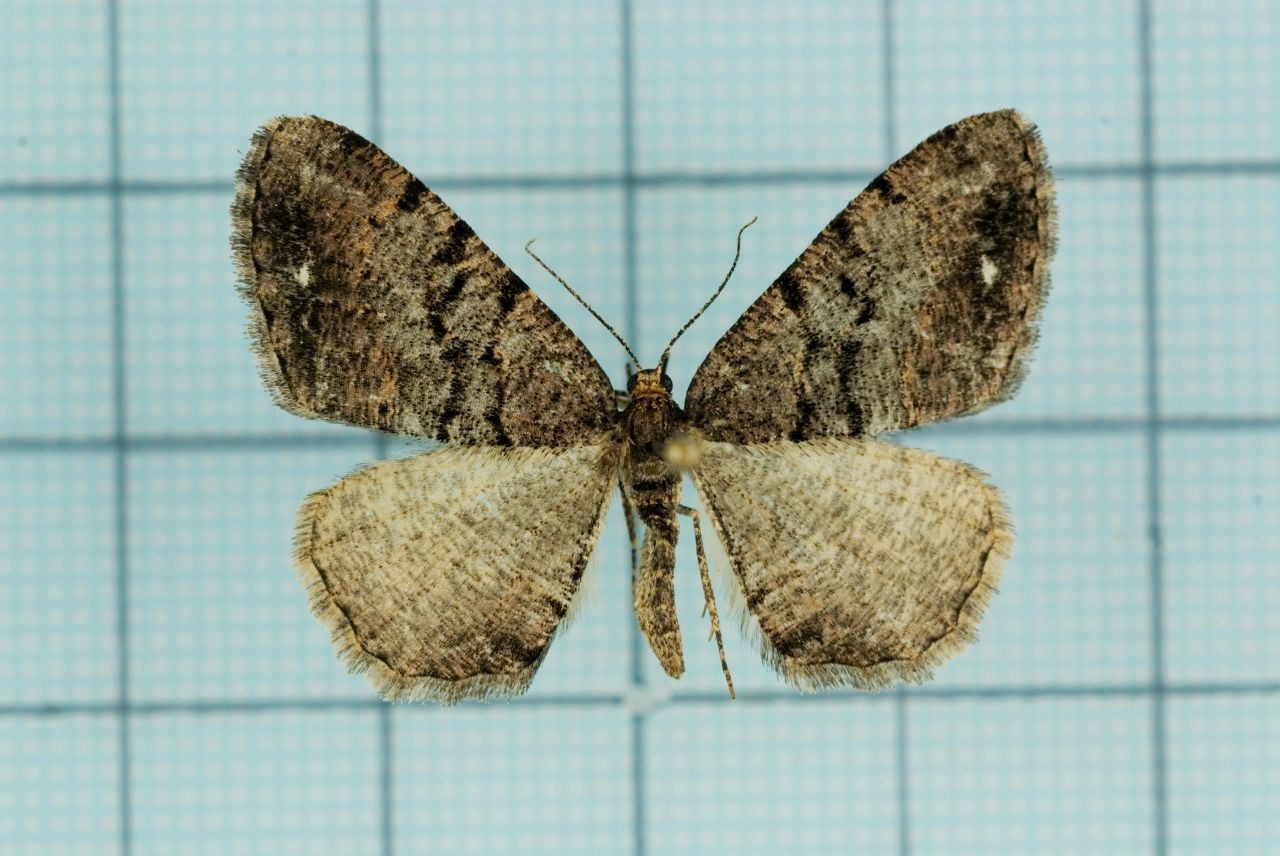
- Parectropis subflava

Scientific classification
- Kingdom: Animalia
- Phylum: Arthropoda
- Clade: Pancrustacea
- Class: Insecta
- Order: Lepidoptera
- Family: Geometridae
- Tribe: Boarmiini
- Genus: Parectropis; Sato, 1980

Type species
- Geometra extersaria Hübner, 1799

Diversity
- About 12 species

= Parectropis =

Genus of moths

Parectropis is a genus in the geometer moth family (Geometridae). A small Old World genus, it contains only a good dozen species altogether, though new ones are still being discovered. Only one species (P. similaria) is found in Europe; most others live in Asia though some occur in Africa.

== Selected species ==
Species of Parectropis include:

- Parectropis alticolaria Krüger, 2005
- Parectropis delosaria (Walker, [1863]) (formerly in Ectropis)
- Parectropis extersaria (Hübner, 1799) (sometimes in P. similaria)
- Parectropis fansipana Sato, 2006
- Parectropis nigrosparsa (Wileman & South, 1923)
- Parectropis paracyclophora Sato & M.Wang, 2006
- Parectropis pectinicornis Krüger, 2005
- Parectropis siamensis
- Parectropis similaria (Hufnagel, 1767)
- Parectropis simplex (Warren, 1914) (formerly in Ectropis)
- Parectropis subflava (Bastelberger, 1909) (formerly in Ectropis)
- Parectropis 'Camdeboo Mountains'
- Parectropis 'Sterkstroom'
