= Ectropis obliqua =

Scientific classification
- Kingdom: Animalia
- Phylum: Arthropoda
- Clade: Pancrustacea
- Class: Insecta
- Order: Lepidoptera
- Family: Geometridae
- Genus: Ectropis
- Species: E. obliqua

Binomial name
- Ectropis obliqua Prout, 1915

Species of moth

Ectropis obliqua is a species of moth in the family Geometridae, first described by Prout in 1915.

== Description ==
The larva body surface is smooth, with only six abdominal and hip section on foot, trunk when a flexor stretching, commonly known as back arched bug or gauge.

== Infestation of tea plants ==
E. obliqua is one of the most destructive pest insects on tea plants throughout the growing areas of this crop in southern China, causing widespread damage in Zhejiang, Jiangsu, and Anhui provinces. Larvae feed solely on shoots and leaves of the C. sinensis and occur in six or seven overlapping generations throughout the growing season of tea plants.

Infestations of tea plants may be treated by removing the pupal stage of the E. obliqua life cycle, through predation by chickens, manual removal of larvae, chemical treatments, or biological control (e.g. with tea looper karyotype virus).

== Associated viruses ==
The Ectropis obliqua picorna-like virus (EoPV) has been isolated from E. obliqua larvae.
