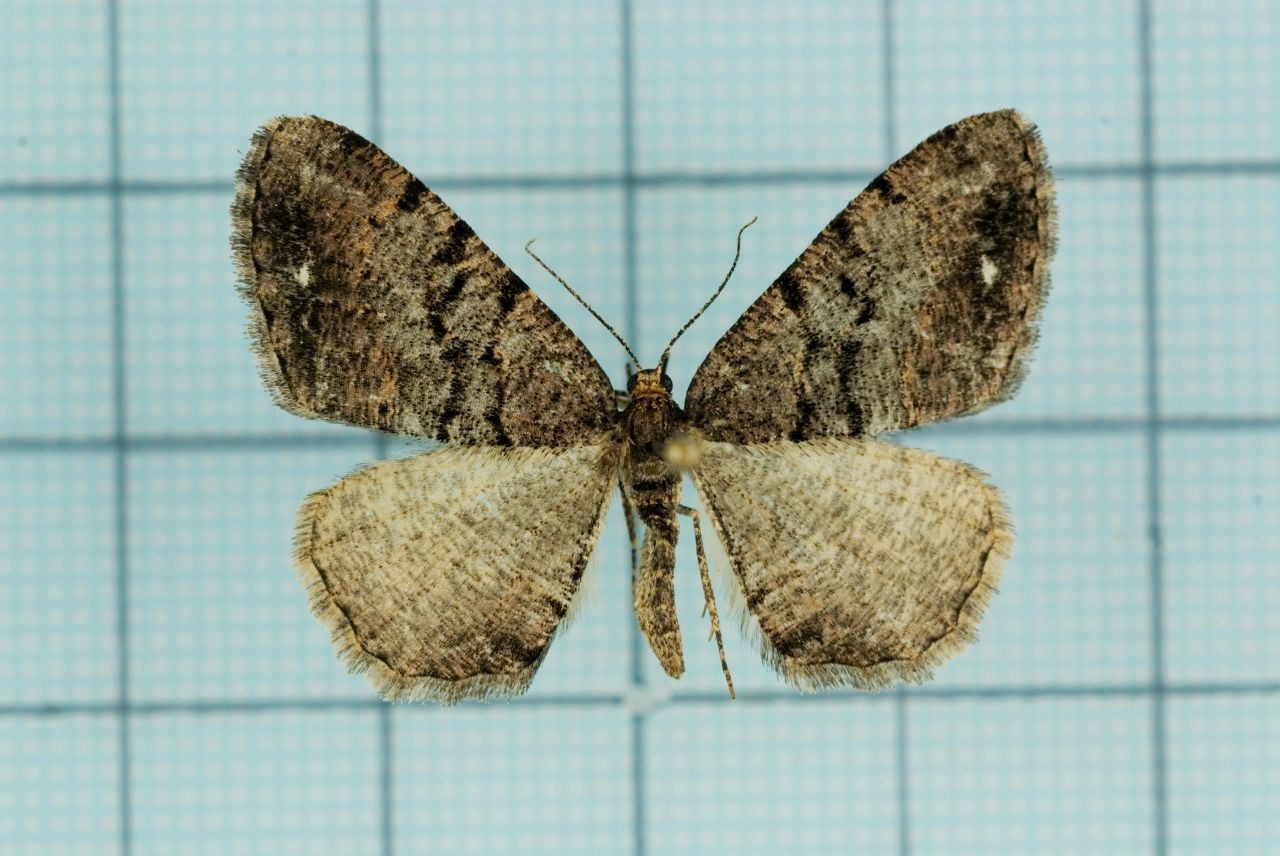

Scientific classification
- Domain: Eukaryota
- Kingdom: Animalia
- Phylum: Arthropoda
- Class: Insecta
- Order: Lepidoptera
- Family: Geometridae
- Genus: Parectropis
- Species: P. subflava

Binomial name
- Parectropis subflava (Bastelberger, 1909)

Synonyms
- Ectropis subflava Bastelberger 1909; Ectropis leucosema Prout, 1914

= Parectropis subflava =

Species of moth

Parectropis subflava is a moth of the family Geometridae. It is found in Taiwan.
