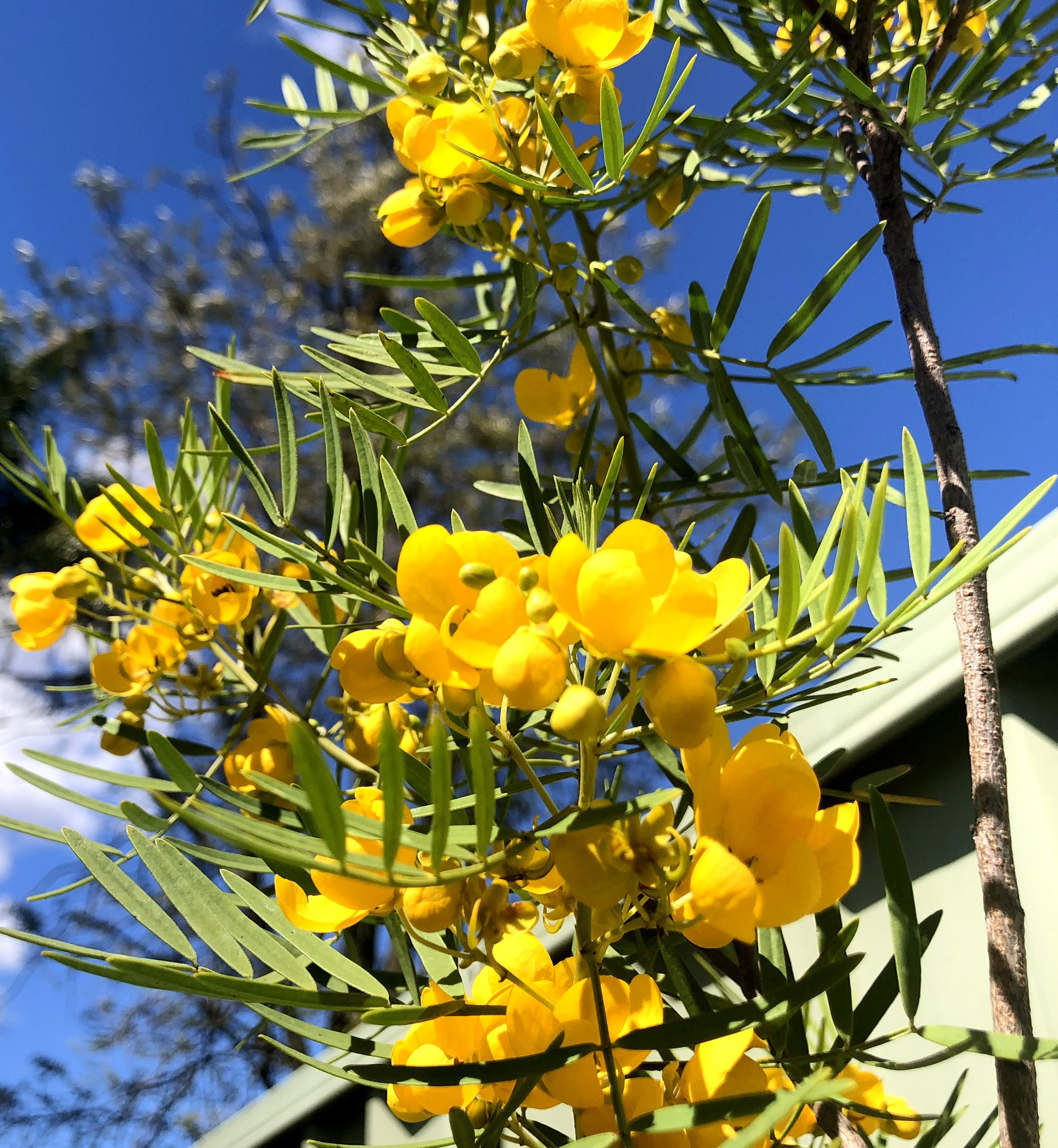
- Spring blooms

Scientific classification
- Kingdom: Plantae
- Clade: Tracheophytes
- Clade: Angiosperms
- Clade: Eudicots
- Clade: Rosids
- Order: Fabales
- Family: Fabaceae
- Subfamily: Caesalpinioideae
- Genus: Senna
- Species: S. odorata

Binomial name
- Senna odorata (R.Morris) Randall

Synonyms
- Cassia australis Sims; Cassia odorata R.Morris; Cassia schultesii Colla; Senna barronfieldii Colla

= Senna odorata =

Species of legume

Senna odorata, which is also known as fragrant senna, spreading cassia, sweet-scented cassia or southern cassia, is a species of flowering plant in the legume family that is native to Australia.

== Description ==
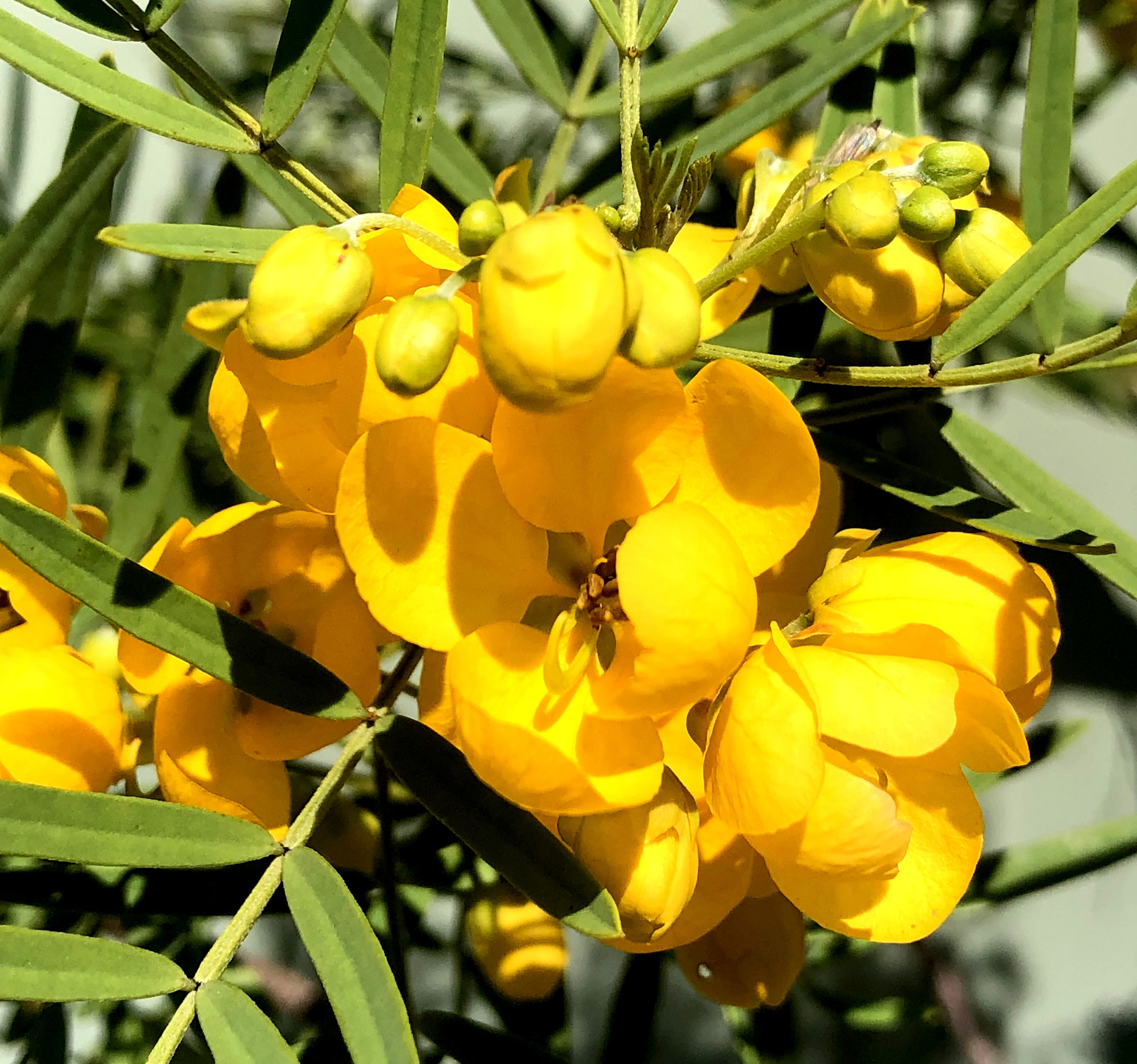
Yellow flowers

S. odorata can usually reach a height of 1.5–2.4 m (4 ft 11 in – 7 ft 10 in), but this upright and sprawling perennial shrub may become a tree. It has paripinnate alternate leaves, with six to 12 pairs of leathery textured, slender, oval leaflets.

Flowers are bright yellow and cup-shaped, arranged in small clusters or in panicles. They are lightly fragrant (hence the specific epithet odorata, meaning odorous). The flowering period extends from late winter to spring. The fruits are flat legume pods with many small seeds.

== Distribution ==
This species is native to the forest edges of Australia (southern Queensland, south to New South Wales), usually in dry sclerophyll forest. It has been introduced in India and Mauritius.

In its habitat, the plant can tolerate drought, light frost and high wind.

== Gallery ==
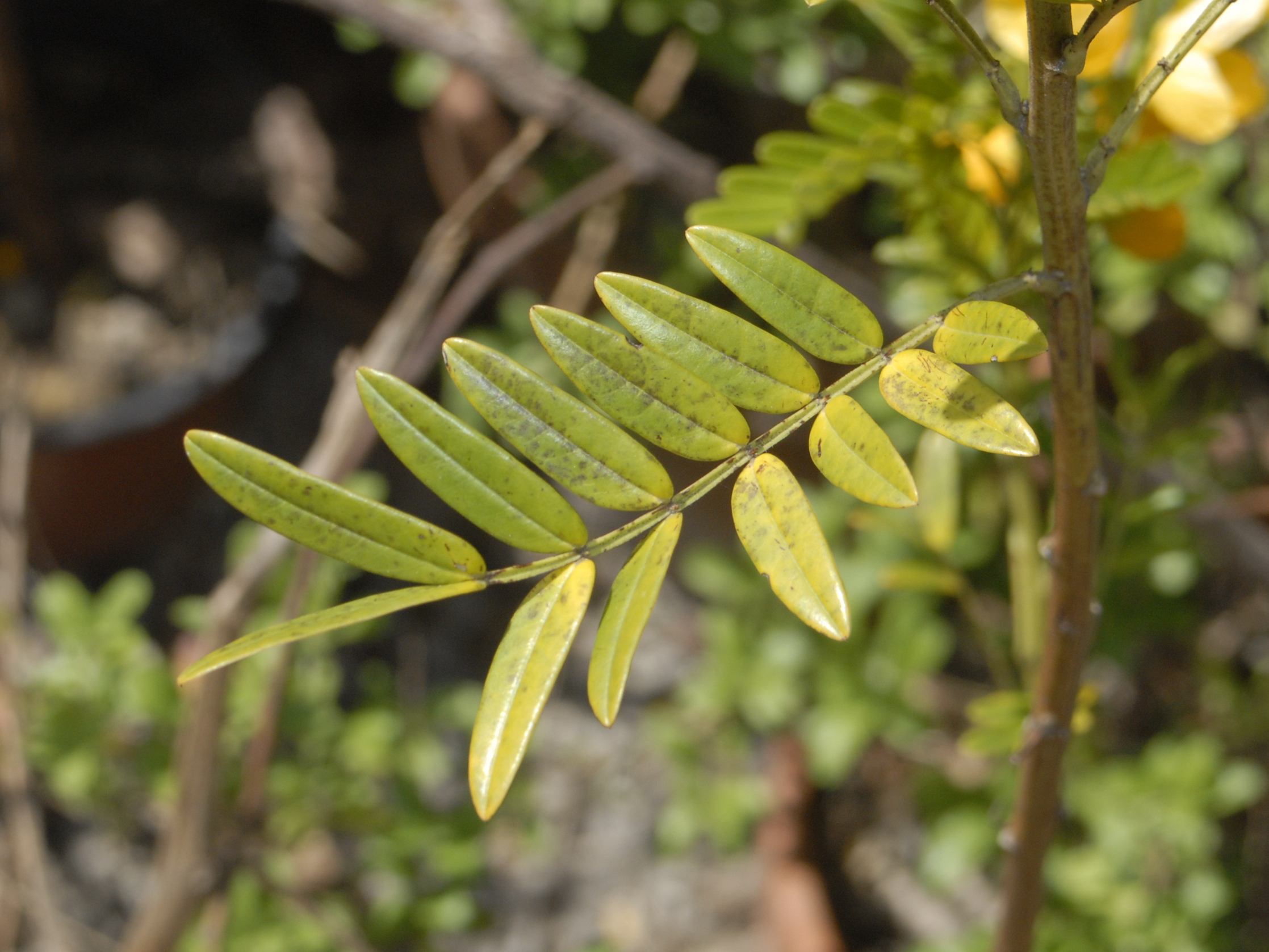
Leaflets of S. odorata

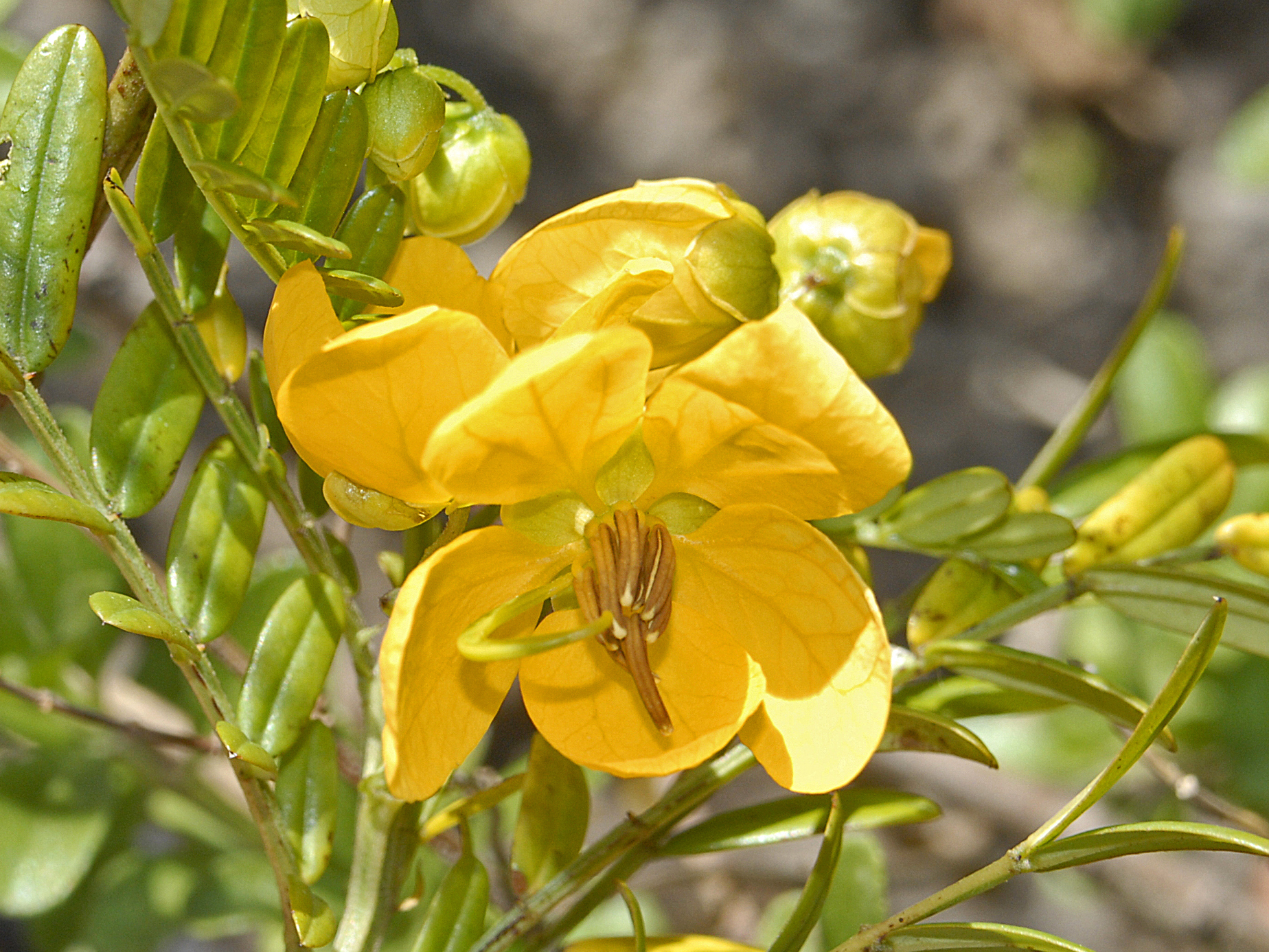
Flower of Senna odorata at the Orto Botanico dell'Università di Genova

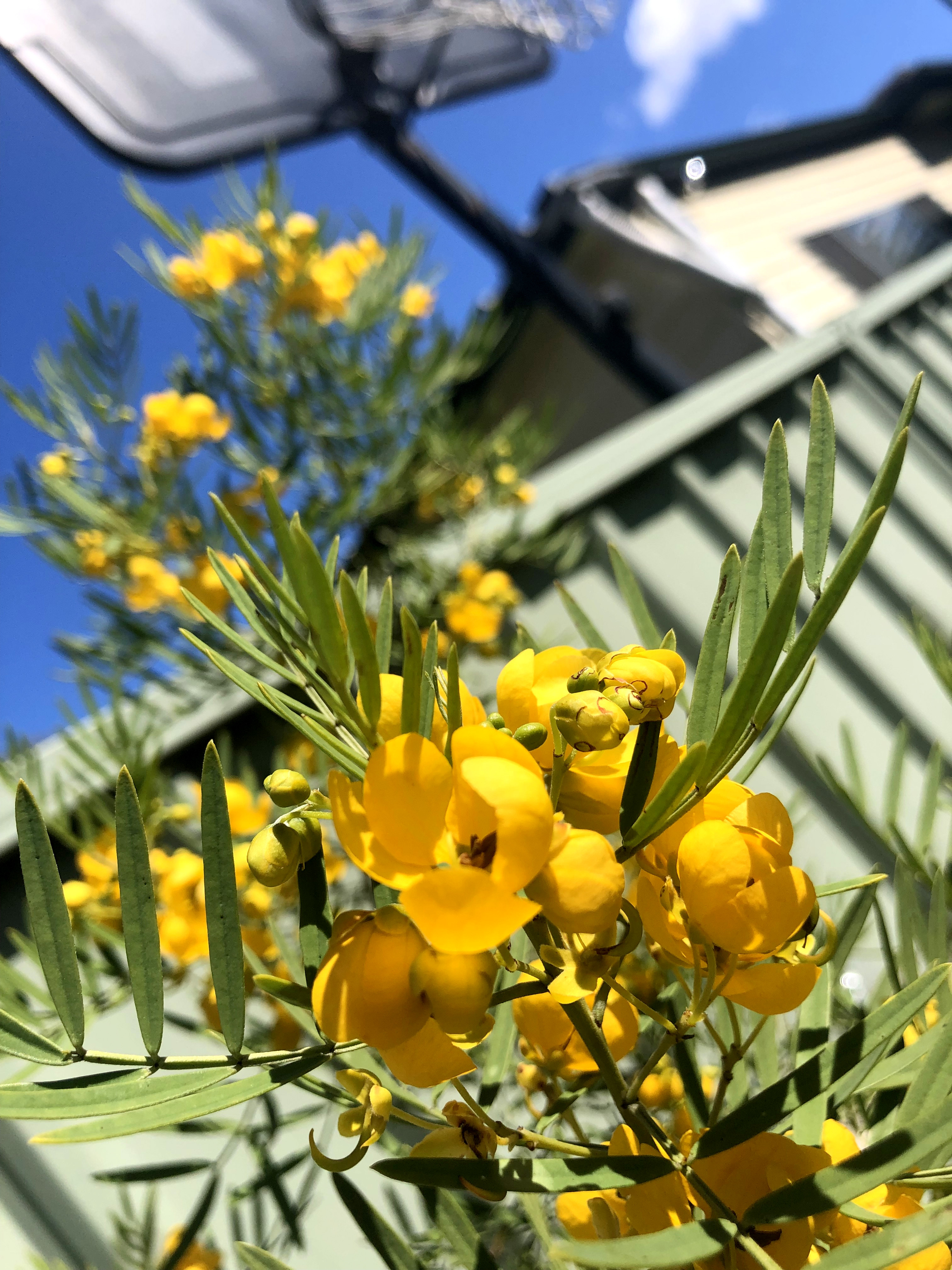
Blooming in early spring, in Australia

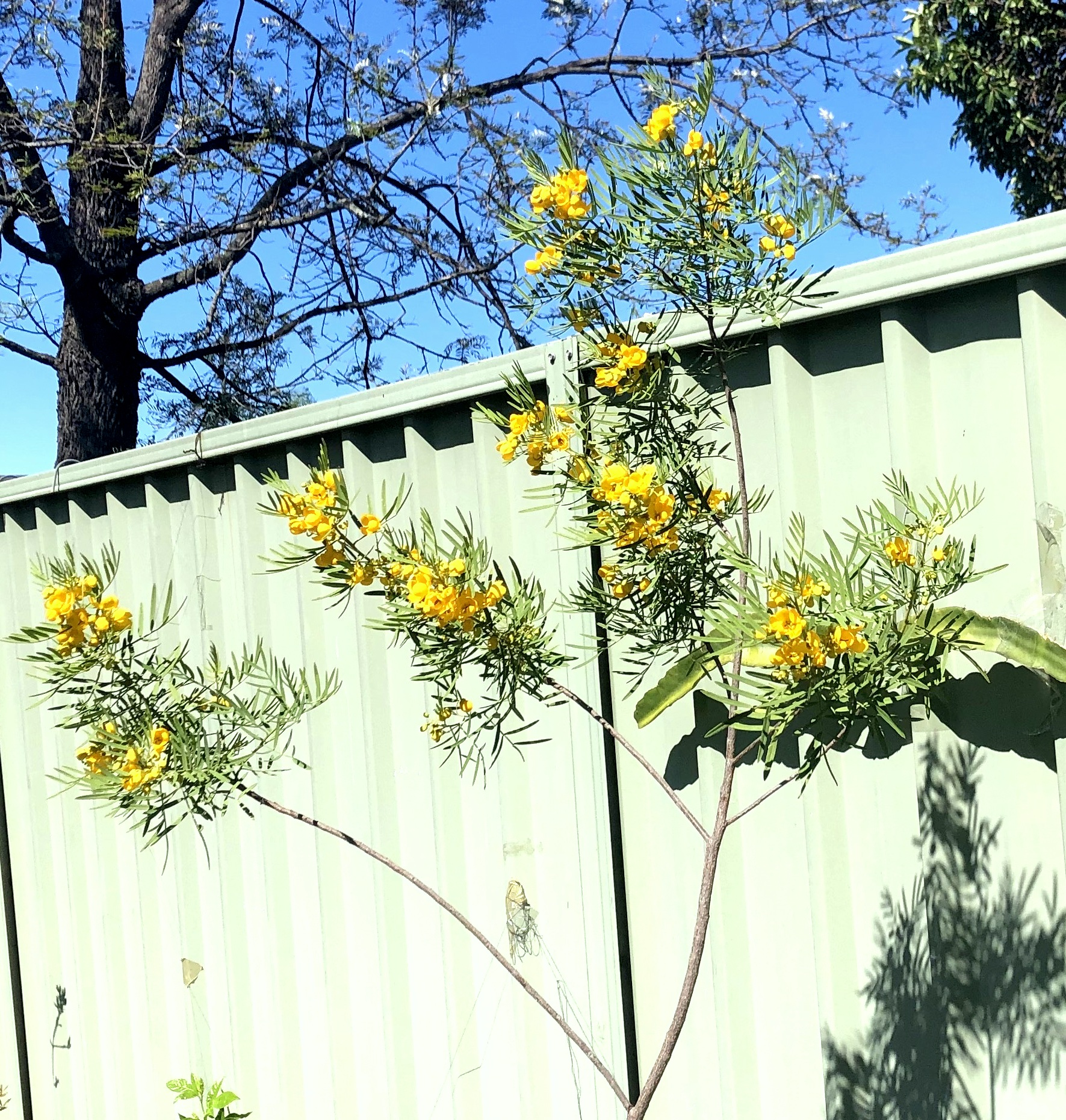
Shrub in full view

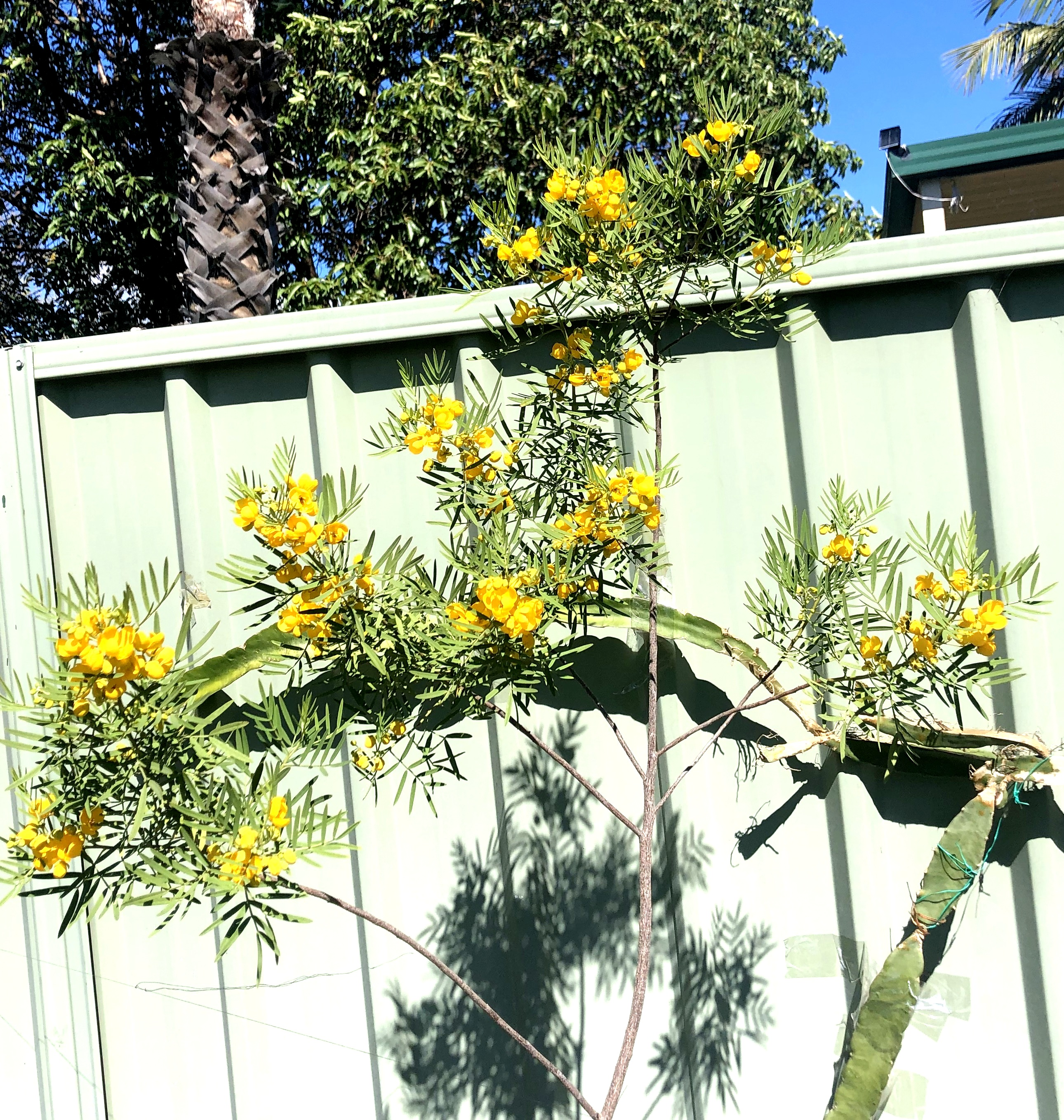
The crown of the bush

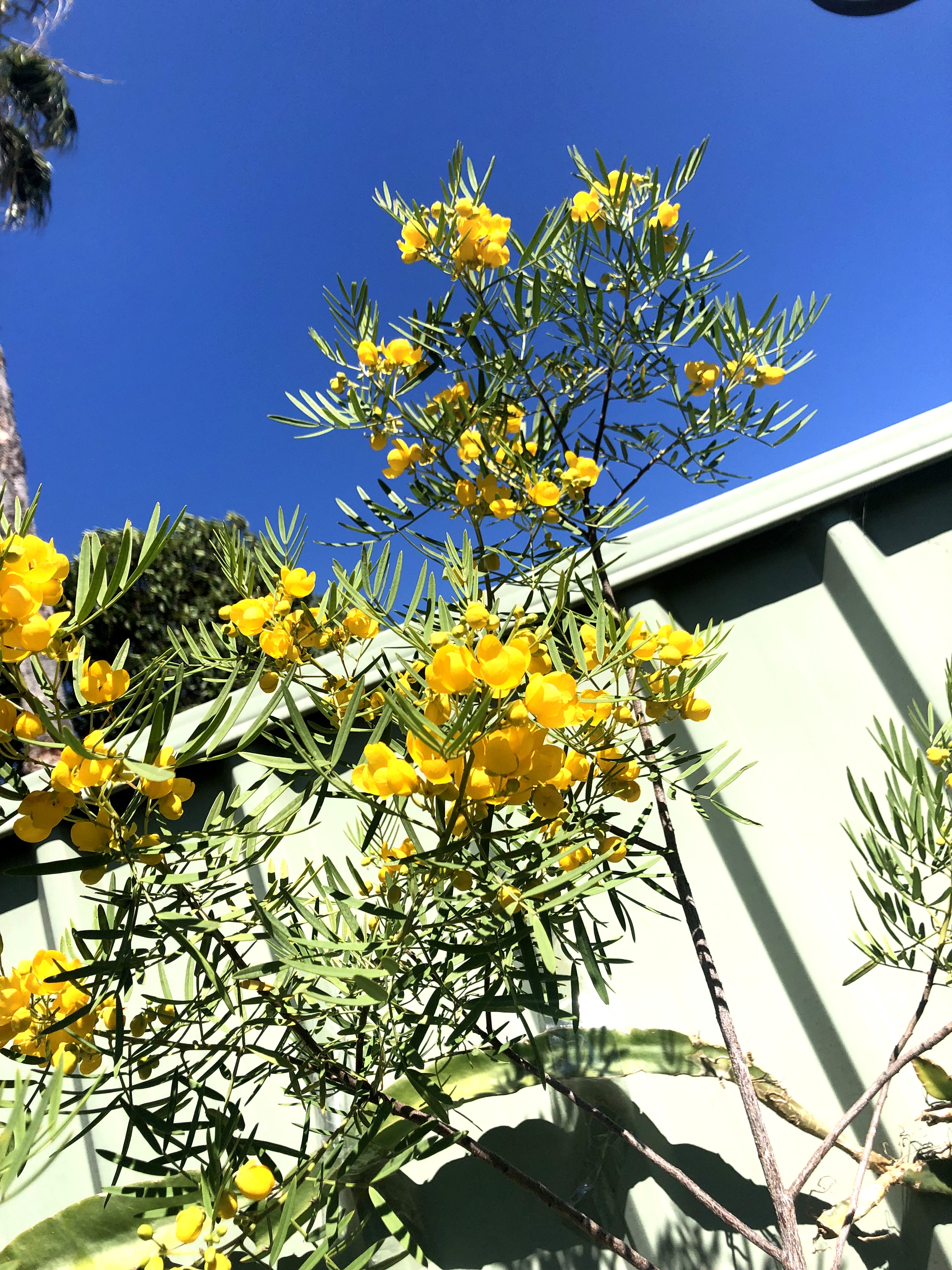
Leaves and flowers

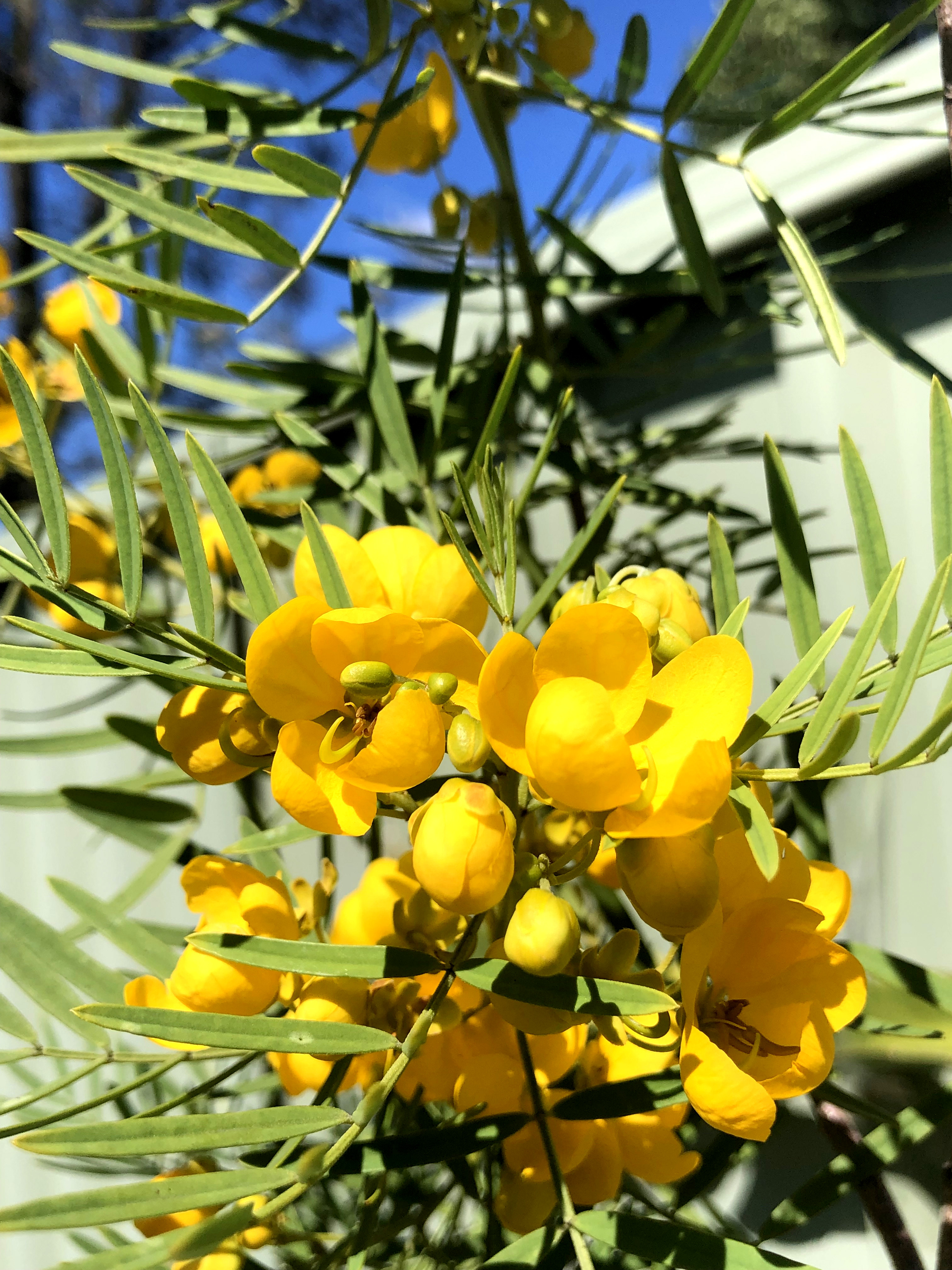
Budding flowers

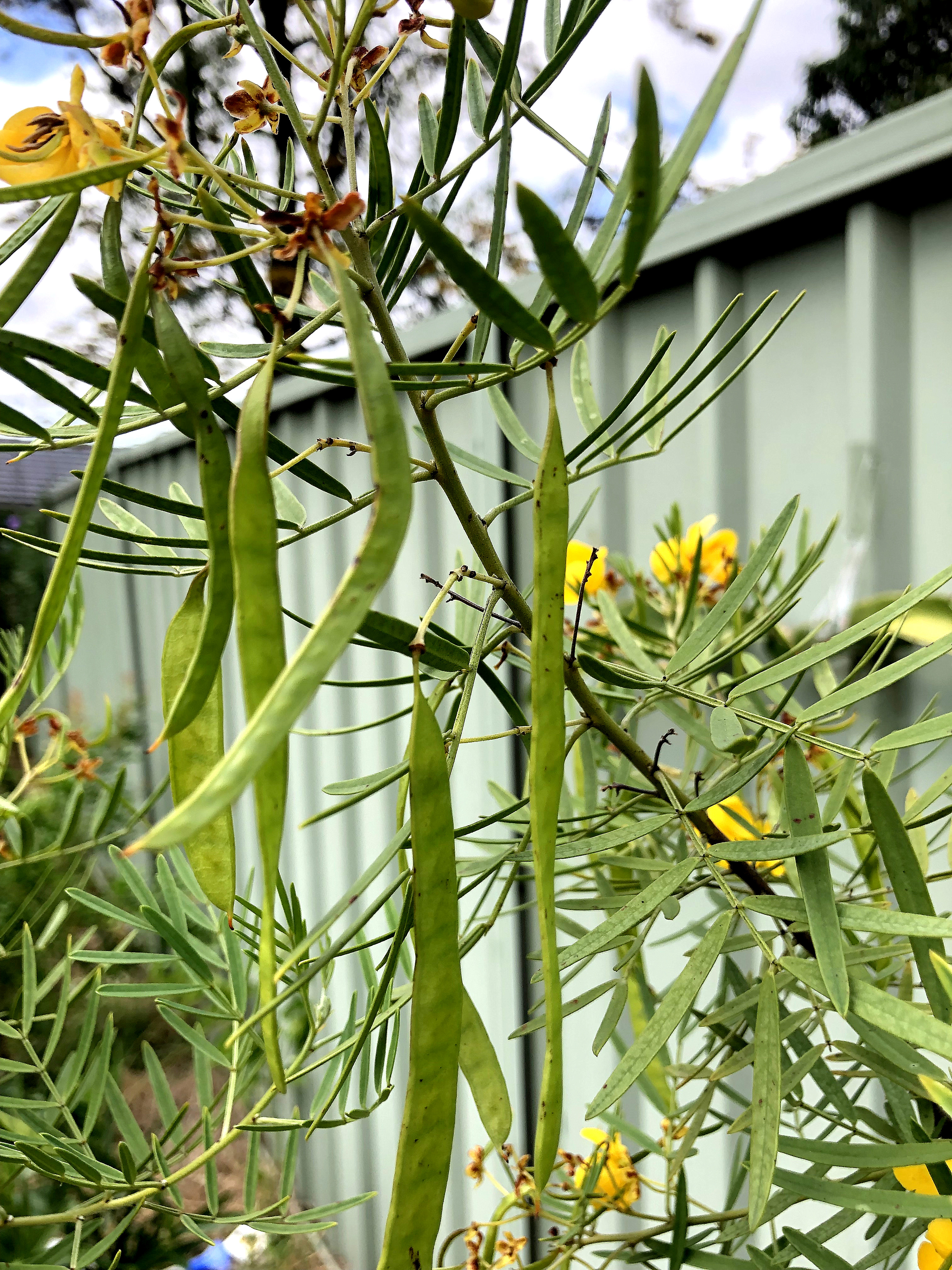
Seedpods
