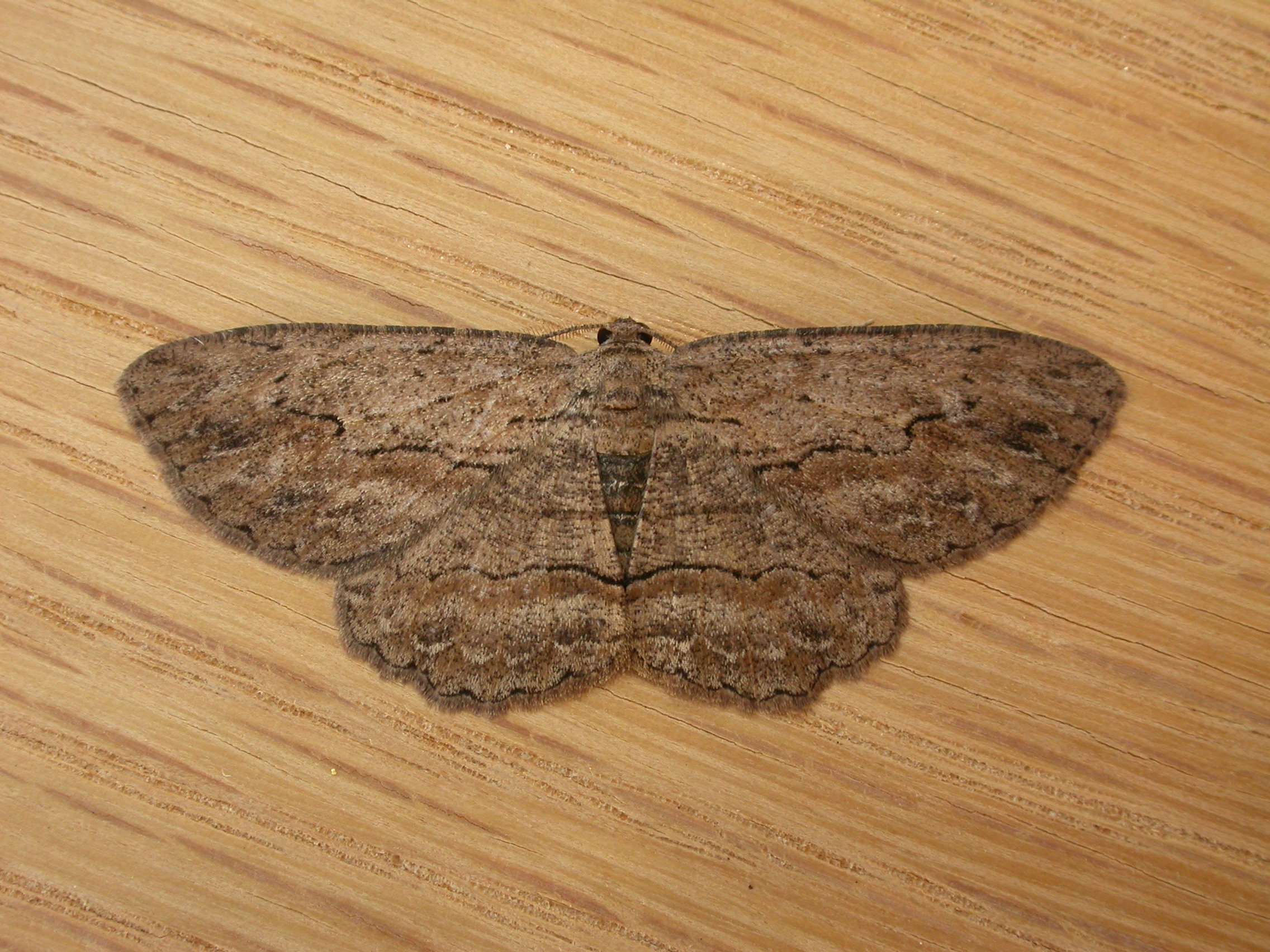

Scientific classification
- Kingdom: Animalia
- Phylum: Arthropoda
- Class: Insecta
- Order: Lepidoptera
- Family: Geometridae
- Genus: Ectropis
- Species: E. excursaria

Binomial name
- Ectropis excursaria Guenée, 1857

Synonyms
- Tephrosia exportaria

= Ectropis excursaria =

Species of moth

Ectropis excursaria, the twig looper, is a moth of the family Geometridae. It is found in the Eastern part of Australia.

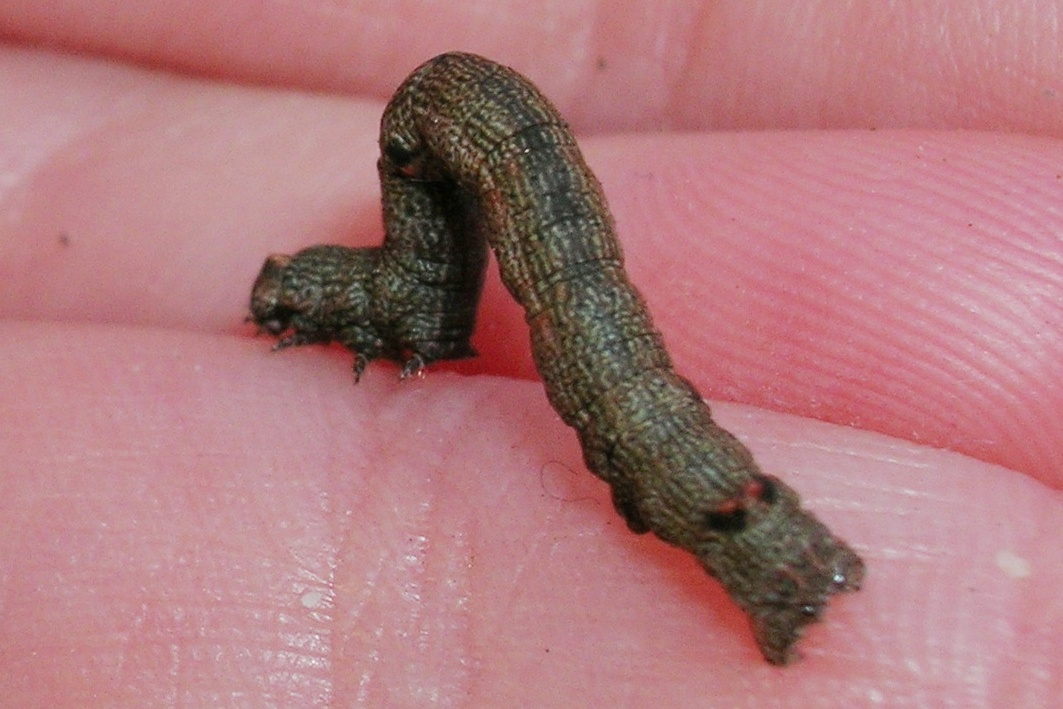
Larva

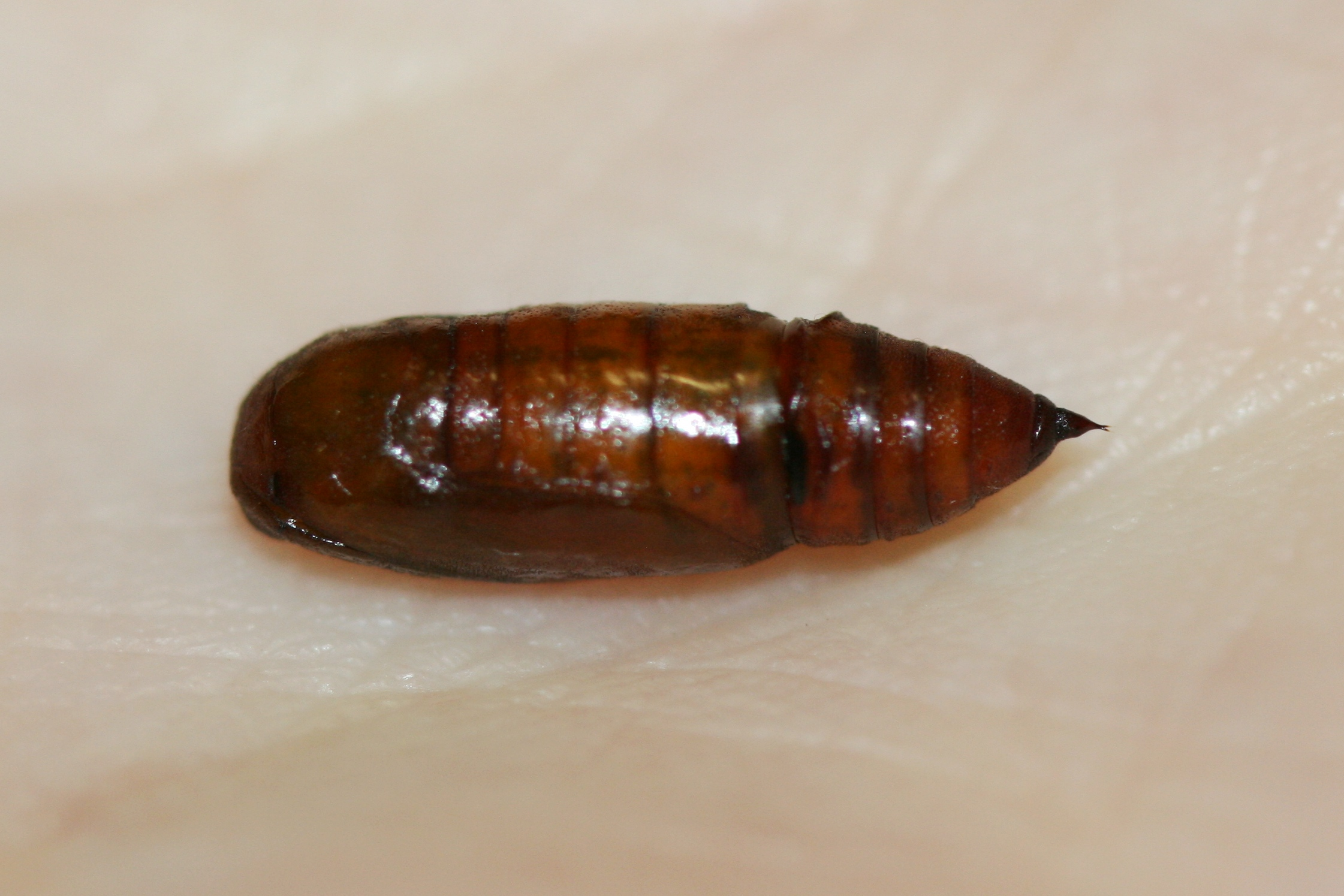
Pupa

The wingspan is 30–45 mm, with the females being larger than the males.

The larvae feed on a wide range of plants, including Hedera helix, Pelargonium zonale, Juglans regia, Salvia officinalis, Pinus radiata, Rosa odorata, Gardenia jasminoides, Citrus limon, Hardenbergia violacea and Cassia, Acacia, Eucalyptus, Bursaria and Hakea species.
