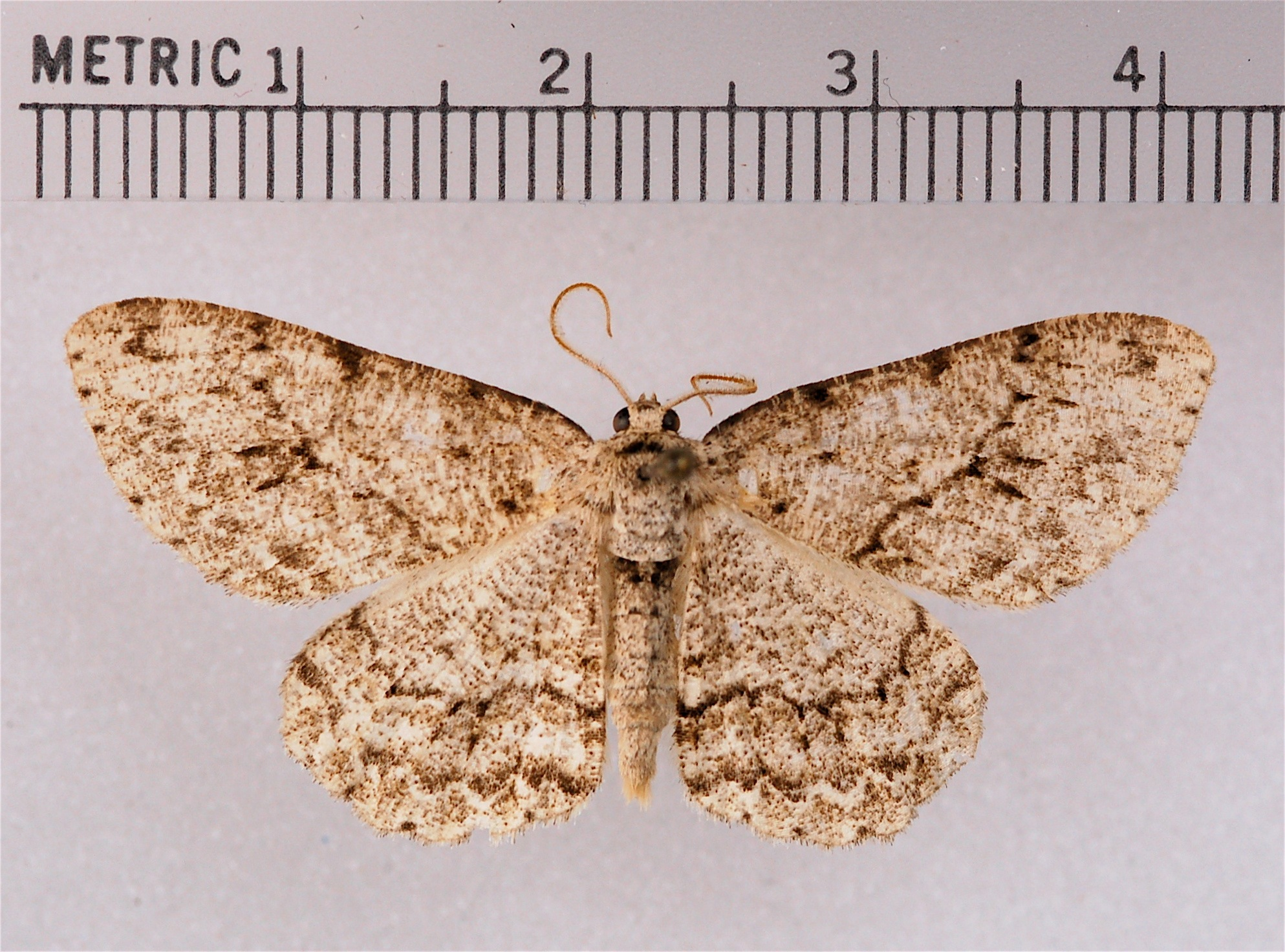
- Small engrailed (E. crepuscularia sensu stricto); Scale in centimeters

Scientific classification
- Kingdom: Animalia
- Phylum: Arthropoda
- Clade: Pancrustacea
- Class: Insecta
- Order: Lepidoptera
- Family: Geometridae
- Tribe: Boarmiini
- Genus: Ectropis; Hübner, [1825]

Type species
- Geometra crepuscularia Denis & Schiffermüller, 1775

Diversity
- About 100 species

Synonyms
- Boarmia Stephens, 1829 (non Treitschke, 1825: preoccupied); Coenobita Gistl, 1848 (non Latreille, 1829: preoccupied); Tephrosia Boisduval, 1840

= Ectropis =

Genus of insects

Ectropis is a genus in the geometer moth family (Geometridae). They are mostly paleotropical, but also plentiful in Australia and extend into Asia. Only one species – or cryptic species complex – (the engrailed/small engrailed, E. bistortata/E. crepuscularia) is found in Europe. There are about 100 known species in this genus.

== Systematics and taxonomy ==
All junior synonyms of Ectropis use G. crepuscularia as type species, and thus, even though this large genus might warrant subgeneric division, no names are presently available. Apart from Tephrosia, established by Jean Baptiste Boisduval in 1840, the synonyms are also junior homonyms and consequently completely invalid.

One of them, Coenobita, was proposed by Johannes von Nepomuk Franz Xaver Gistel in 1848. Gistl was unaware that Jacob Hübner had described the genus Ectropis, but he knew of Boisduval's Tephrosia. However, Gistl misread the name of the spider genus Theraphosa (established by Charles Athanase Walckenaer in 1805) as Tephrosia, and thus came to believe that Tephrosia was in need of a new name. He chose Coenobita, which to his misfortune had been given to a genus of hermit crabs by Pierre André Latreille in 1829 already.

The other preoccupied synonym, Boarmia, had earlier been given to closely related moths. That group is now included in Hypomecis, which thus has become the type genus of the tribe Boarmiini in the geometer moth subfamily Ennominae. Ectropis is also a member of the Boarmiini.

=== Selected species ===
Species of Ectropis include:

- Ectropis albobrunnea Herbulot, 1981
- Ectropis adtenuata Herbulot, 1999
- Ectropis aganopa (Meyrick, 1892)
- Ectropis albiquadrata Herbulot, 1999
- Ectropis amphitromera Prout, 1911
- Ectropis anisa Prout, 1915
- Ectropis anisoides Herbulot, 1981
- Ectropis annumerata Prout, 1925
- Ectropis argalea Meyrick, 1892
- Ectropis arizanensis Wileman, 1915
- Ectropis basalis Herbulot, 1981
- Ectropis bhurmitra (Walker, 1860)
- Ectropis bicolor Herbulot, 1972
- Ectropis bispinaria Guenée, 1857
- Ectropis bistortatoides Herbulot, 1954
- Ectropis brevifasciata Wileman, 1912
- Ectropis brooksi Holloway, 1976
- Ectropis calida Goldfinch, 1944
- Ectropis celsicola Herbulot, 1972
- Ectropis chopardi Herbulot, 1954
- Ectropis contradicta Herbulot, 1972
- Ectropis consentanea Sato, 1992
- Ectropis cornuta Herbulot, 1968
- Ectropis crepuscularia (Denis & Schiffermüller, 1775) – the engrailed, small engrailed (including E. bistortata)
- Ectropis despicata Herbulot, 1981
- Ectropis distinctaria (de Joannis, 1915)
- Ectropis dribraria (Swinhoe, 1904)
- Ectropis elaphrodes D. S. Fletcher, 1958
- Ectropis emphona (Prout, 1925)
- Ectropis excellens (Butler, 1884)
- Ectropis excursaria Guenée, 1857 – twig looper
- Ectropis floresensis Sato, 2007
- Ectropis fossa Herbulot, 1981
- Ectropis fractaria Guenée, 1857
- Ectropis fraudulenta Janse, 1932
- Ectropis gozmanyi D. S. Fletcher, 1978
- Ectropis gravis (Turner, 1947)
- Ectropis hero Viette, 1971
- Ectropis herbuloti Sato, 2007
- Ectropis holmi D. S. Fletcher, 1958
- Ectropis ikonda Herbulot, 1981
- Ectropis inversa D. S. Fletcher, 1958
- Ectropis ischnadelpha L.B.Prout, 1932
- Ectropis lignea Goldfinch, 1944
- Ectropis longiscapia Prout, 1926
- Ectropis loxosira Prout, 1932
- Ectropis lutamentaria (Graeser, 1888)
- Ectropis maromokotra Viette, 1980
- Ectropis milloti Herbulot, 1954
- Ectropis mniara Turner, 1917
- Ectropis moderata Herbulot, 1972
- Ectropis nigripunctata Warren, 1897
- Ectropis obliqua Prout 1915
- Ectropis obliquilinea Prout, 1916
- Ectropis ocellata Warren, 1902
- Ectropis oleitincta Prout, 1931
- Ectropis paracopa Prout, 1925
- Ectropis pauliani Herbulot, 1954
- Ectropis pluto Viette, 1971
- Ectropis prospila (Prout, 1916)
- Ectropis pais Prout, 1931
- Ectropis petrozona (Lower, 1900)
- Ectropis schintlmeisteri Sato, 1992
- Ectropis scoblei Herbulot, 1999 (formerly E. despicata Herbulot, 1981)
- Ectropis sogai Herbulot, 1981
- Ectropis spoliataria (Walker, 1860)
- Ectropis subapicata (Warren, 1904)
- Ectropis sublimbata (Warren, 1911)
- Ectropis sublutea (Butler, 1880)
- Ectropis superuncina Herbulot, 1972
- Ectropis susceptaria Walker
- Ectropis ulterior Herbulot, 1954
- Ectropis vadoni Herbulot, 1954

Some species formerly included here are now placed elsewhere, e.g. in Calcyopa, Myrioblephara or Parectropis
