= Acacia ayersiana var. latifolia =

Scientific classification
- Kingdom: Plantae
- Clade: Tracheophytes
- Clade: Angiosperms
- Clade: Eudicots
- Clade: Rosids
- Order: Fabales
- Family: Fabaceae
- Subfamily: Caesalpinioideae
- Clade: Mimosoid clade
- Genus: Acacia
- Species: A. ayersiana
- Variety: A. a. var. latifolia

Trinomial name
- Acacia ayersiana var. latifolia (J.Black) Randell

Variety of plants

Acacia ayersiana var. latifolia is a plant that grows in arid areas of Australia.

== Description ==
It grows as a shrub or tree, up to ten metres high. It has blue-grey phyllodes and yellow flowers.

== Taxonomy ==
There is some confusion as to the origin of the type specimen for this variety. No type was specified when the variety was published, and the specimens in the type folder at the Adelaide Herbarium are said to have been obtained by L. Abrahams at Cobar, New South Wales. However, this variety does not occur in New South Wales, and nothing is known of L. Abrahams.

It was published as A. aneura var. latifolia by John McConnell Black in 1923. Barbara Randell transferred it from A. aneura to A. ayersiana in 1992.

== Distribution ==
It occurs in arid and semi-arid parts of Australia, including parts of Western Australia, South Australia, and the Northern Territory. It is usually found in red sandy or loamy soils, often along creek lines.

== See also ==
- List of Acacia species
