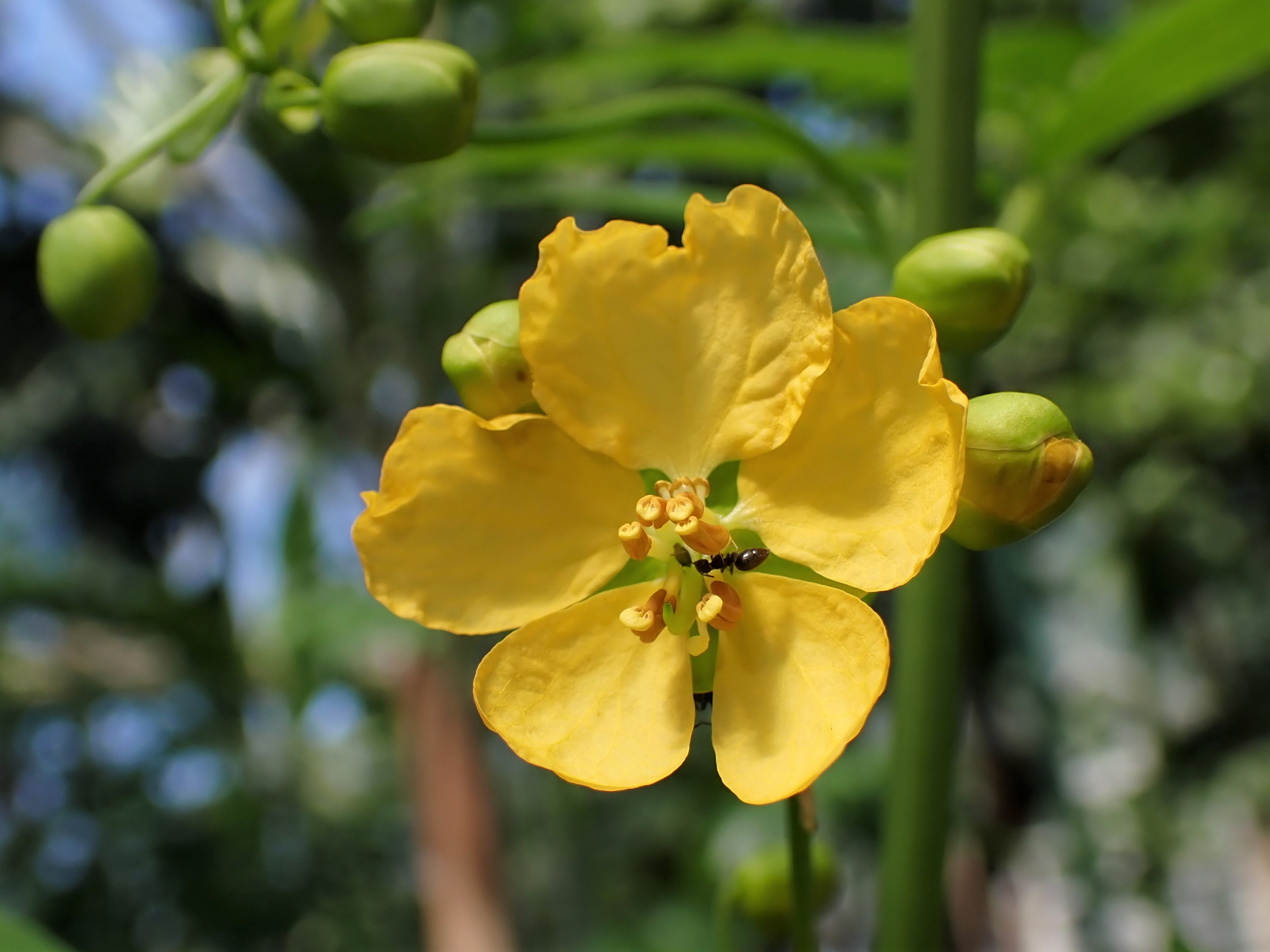

Scientific classification
- Kingdom: Plantae
- Clade: Tracheophytes
- Clade: Angiosperms
- Clade: Eudicots
- Clade: Rosids
- Order: Fabales
- Family: Fabaceae
- Subfamily: Caesalpinioideae
- Genus: Senna
- Species: S. barclayana

Binomial name
- Senna barclayana (Sweet) Randell

Synonyms
- Cassia barclayana Sweet; Cassia barclayana Sweet var. barclayana; Cassia lancifolia Colla; Cassia occidentalis var. schinifolia (DC.) de Wit; Cassia schinifolia DC.; Cassia sophera var. barclayana (Sweet) Domin; Cassia sophera var. schinifolia (DC.) Benth.

= Senna barclayana =

Smooth senna

Species of legume

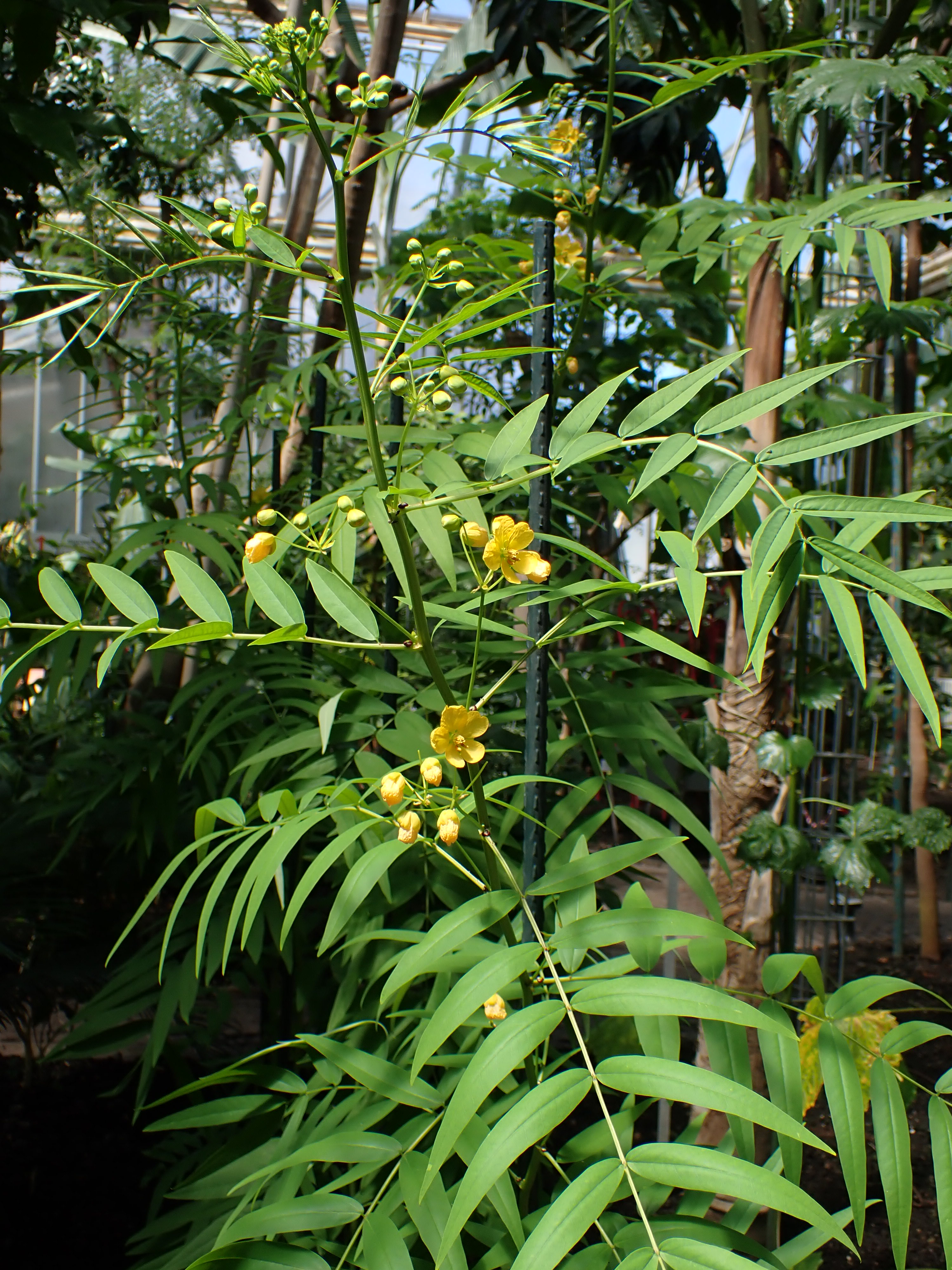
Foliage in Berlin Botanic Garden

Senna barclayana, commonly known as smooth senna or pepper-leaf senna, is a species of flowering plant in the family Fabaceae and is endemic to eastern Australia. It is a herbaceous perennial or subshrub with pinnate leaves with six to ten pairs of lance-shaped or narrowly elliptic leaflets, and yellow flowers in groups of six to ten.

== Description ==
Senna barclayana is an erect, herbaceous perennial subshrub that typically grows to a height of up to 1.5 m (4 ft 11 in). Its leaves are pinnate, 80–120 mm (3.1–4.7 in) long on a petiole 10–20 mm (0.39–0.79 in) long, with six to ten pairs of lance-shaped or narrowly elliptic leaflets 20–50 mm (0.79–1.97 in) long and 4–9 mm (0.16–0.35 in) wide. There is a sessile gland near the base of the petiole, and a stipule that falls off as the leaf opens. The flowers are yellow and arranged in upper leaf axils in pairs or groups of six to ten on a peduncle 20–35 mm (0.79–1.38 in) long, each flower on a pedicel 12–20 mm (0.47–0.79 in) long. The petals are up to 20 mm (0.79 in) long and there are six fertile stamens and four staminodes, the longest anthers about 3 mm (0.12 in) long. Flowering occurs all year, and the fruit is a cylindrical pod 30–50 mm (1.2–2.0 in) long.

== Taxonomy ==
This species was first formally described in 1827 by Robert Sweet who gave it the name Cassia barclayana in his Flora Australasica. In 1988, Barbara Rae Randell transferred the species to Senna as Senna barclayana in the Journal of the Adelaide Botanic Garden. The specific epithet (barclayana) honours Robert Barclay of Bury-hill (1751–1830).

== Distribution and habitat ==
Senna barclayana grows in open forest in southern Queensland and northern New South Wales, but its range is increasing and it is now naturalised in Victoria, South Australia and Western Australia.
