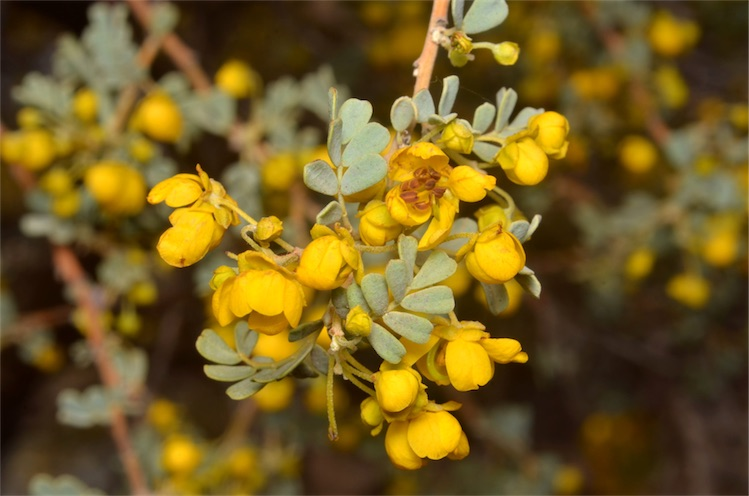
- Subspecies gawlerensis

Scientific classification
- Kingdom: Plantae
- Clade: Tracheophytes
- Clade: Angiosperms
- Clade: Eudicots
- Clade: Rosids
- Order: Fabales
- Family: Fabaceae
- Subfamily: Caesalpinioideae
- Genus: Senna
- Species: S. cardiosperma

Binomial name
- Senna cardiosperma (F.Muell.) Randell

Synonyms
- Cassia cardiosperma F.Muell.

= Senna cardiosperma =

Species of legume

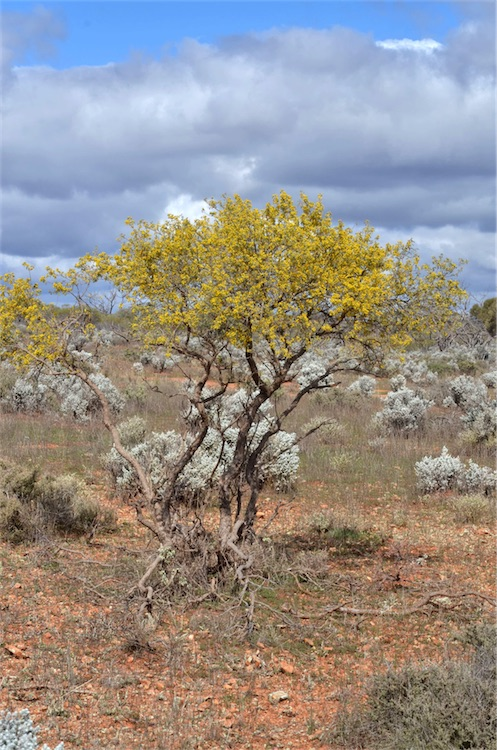
Subspecies gawlerensis, habit in the Gawler Ranges area

Senna cardiosperma is a species of flowering plant in the family Fabaceae and is endemic to the western half of Australia. It is an erect shrub or small tree with pinnate leaves, the number and shape of the leaflets depending on subspecies, yellow flowers with ten fertile stamens in each flower, and flat pods.

== Description ==
Senna cardiosperma is an erect shrub or small tree that typically grows to a height of up to 2 m (6 ft 7 in). Its leaves are pinnate, the size of the leaves and the number and shape of the leaflets varying with subspecies. The flowers are yellow and borne in upper leaf axils, with ten fertile stamens in each flower, the filaments of different length between 1 and 2 mm (0.039 and 0.079 in) long. The fruit is a flattened pod.

=== Subspecies cardiosperma ===
Subspecies cardiosperma is an erect shrub up to 2 m (6 ft 7 in) high and has pinnate leaves 5–10 mm (0.20–0.39 in) long on a cylindrical petiole about 2 mm (0.079 in) long, with two to four pairs of linear to narrowly spoon-shaped leaflets 8–15 mm (0.31–0.59 in) long and 1–3 mm (0.039–0.118 in) wide. There is a single sessile gland between the lowest pair of leaflets, and a stipule at the base of the leaf, but that falls off as the leaf opens. The flowers are yellow and arranged in upper leaf axils in pairs or groups of up to four on a peduncle 3–5 mm (0.12–0.20 in) long, each flower on a pedicel 5–10 mm (0.20–0.39 in) long. The petals are 4–6 mm (0.16–0.24 in) long and there are ten fertile stamens, the filaments 1–2 mm (0.039–0.079 in) long. Flowering occurs in winter and spring, and the fruit is a flattened, straight pod 20–50 mm (0.79–1.97 in) long.

=== Subspecies gawlerensis ===
Subspecies cardiosperma is an erect shrub or small tree up to 2 m (6 ft 7 in) high and has pinnate leaves 20–30 mm (0.79–1.18 in) long on a cylindrical petiole about 5 mm (0.20 in) long, with five to ten pairs of egg-shaped leaflets with the narrower end towards the base, 3–6 mm (0.12–0.24 in) long and 2–4 mm (0.079–0.157 in) wide. There is a single sessile gland between the lowest pair of leaflets, and a stipule at the base of the leaf, but that falls usually off as the leaf opens. The flowers are yellow and arranged in upper leaf axils in groups of three to six on a peduncle 1–3 mm (0.039–0.118 in) long, each flower on a pedicel 4–7 mm (0.16–0.28 in) long. The petals are about 5 mm (0.20 in) long and there are ten fertile stamens, the filaments about 1 mm (0.039 in) long. Flowering occurs in most months, and the fruit is a flattened, straight or curved pod 30–50 mm (1.2–2.0 in) long.

=== Subspecies microphylla ===
Subspecies microphylla is an erect shrub up to 2 m (6 ft 7 in) high and has densely woolly-hairy stems and leaves. The leaves are pinnate, 20–30 mm (0.79–1.18 in) long on a cylindrical petiole about 4 mm (0.16 in) long, with eight to ten pairs of needle-shaped leaflets 8–12 mm (0.31–0.47 in) long and about 1 mm (0.039 in) in diameter. There is a stipule at the base of the leaf, but that falls off as the leaf opens. The flowers are yellow and arranged in upper leaf axils in pairs or groups of two to four on a peduncle 2–15 mm (0.079–0.591 in) long, each flower on a pedicel 15–25 mm (0.59–0.98 in) long. The petals are 4–6 mm (0.16–0.24 in) long and there are ten fertile stamens, the filaments about 1 mm (0.039 in) long. Flowering occurs in spring, and the fruit is a flattened, straight pod 30–50 mm (1.2–2.0 in) long.

== Taxonomy ==
This species was first formally described in 1876 by Ferdinand von Mueller who gave it the name Cassia cardiosperma in his Fragmenta Phytographiae Australiae from specimens collected by Jess Young. In 1989, Barbara Rae Randell transferred the species to Senna as Senna cardiosperma in the Journal of the Adelaide Botanic Garden. The specific epithet (cardiosperma) means "heart-seeded".

In the same edition of the Journal of the Adelaide Botanic Gardens, Randell described three subspecies of S. cardiosperma, and the names are accepted by the Australian Plant Census:

- Senna cardiosperma (F.Muell.) Randell subsp. cardiosperma
- Senna cardiosperma subsp. gawlerensis Randell
- Senna cardiosperma subsp. microphylla Randell

== Distribution and habitat ==
Subspecies cardiosperma grows on rocky hillsides in arid places in the Coolgardie, Great Victoria Desert, Mallee, Murchison and Nullarbor bioregions of Western Australia. Subspecies gawlerensis grows in rocky places and in sand on the Eyre Peninsula and in the northwest corner of South Australia, and subsp. microphylla grows in arid shrubland in the far north-western corner of South Australia and in the south of the Northern Territory.
