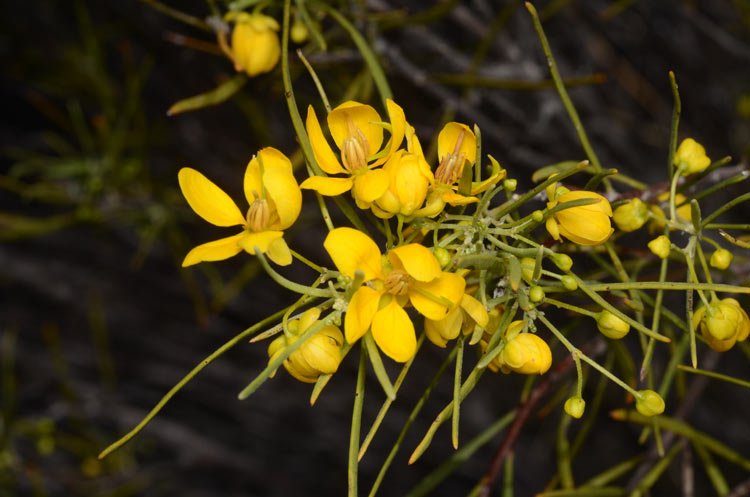
- West of Blackall, Queensland

Scientific classification
- Kingdom: Plantae
- Clade: Tracheophytes
- Clade: Angiosperms
- Clade: Eudicots
- Clade: Rosids
- Order: Fabales
- Family: Fabaceae
- Subfamily: Caesalpinioideae
- Genus: Senna
- Species: S. circinnata

Binomial name
- Senna circinnata (Benth.) Randell

Synonyms
- Cassia circinnata Benth.; Senna artemisioides subsp. circinnata (Benth.) Randell

= Senna circinnata =

Coiled cassia

Species of legume

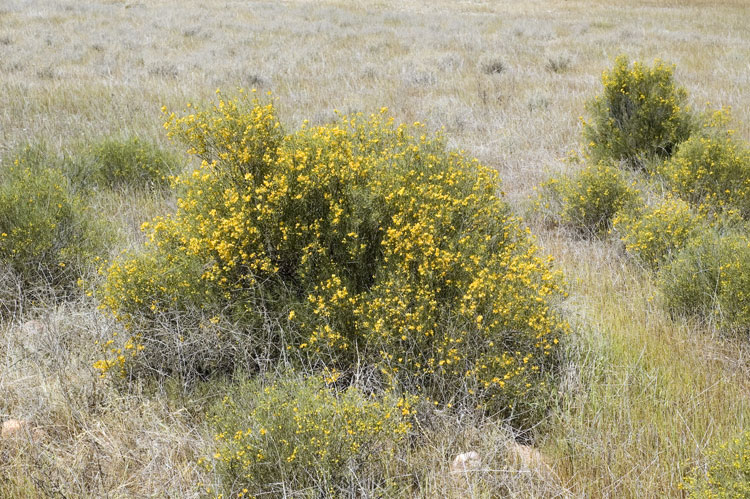
Habit near Euabalong, New South Wales

Senna circinnata, commonly known as coiled cassia, is a species of flowering plant in the family Fabaceae and is endemic to eastern Australia. It is a shrub or small tree with pinnate leaves with one to three pairs of egg-shaped leaflets, and small groups of yellow flowers in upper leaf axils.

== Description ==
Senna circinnata is a shrub or small tree that typically grows to a height of up to 2 m (6 ft 7 in), and is sparsely covered with soft hairs pressed against the surface. Its leaves are pinnate, 30–60 mm (1.2–2.4 in) long on a petiole 15–50 mm (0.59–1.97 in) long, with one to three pairs of egg-shaped leaflets with the narrower end towards the base, 8–12 mm (0.31–0.47 in) long and 4–6 mm (0.16–0.24 in) wide, the leaflets usually lost when the leaf matures. There is a single glands between the lower pair of leaflets. The flowers are yellow and arranged in upper leaf axils in small groups on a peduncle 5–15 mm (0.20–0.59 in) long, each flower on a pedicel 5–10 mm (0.20–0.39 in) long. The petals are about 10 mm (0.39 in) long and there are ten fertile stamens, the anthers 2–4 mm (0.079–0.157 in) long. Flowering occurs in most months with a peak in winter, and the fruit is a flattened, spirally coiled pod 60–120 mm (2.4–4.7 in) long and about 10 mm (0.39 in) wide.

== Taxonomy ==
This species was first formally described in 1848 by George Bentham who gave it the name Cassia circinnata in Thomas Mitchell's Journal of an Expedition into the Interior of Tropical Australia. In 1998, Barbara Rae Randell and Bryan Alwyn Barlow transferred the species to Senna as Senna charlesiana in the Flora of Australia. The specific epithet (circinnata) means "curled around upon itself".

== Distribution and habitat ==
Senna circinnata grows in arid shrubland in western Queensland and in western New South Wales.
