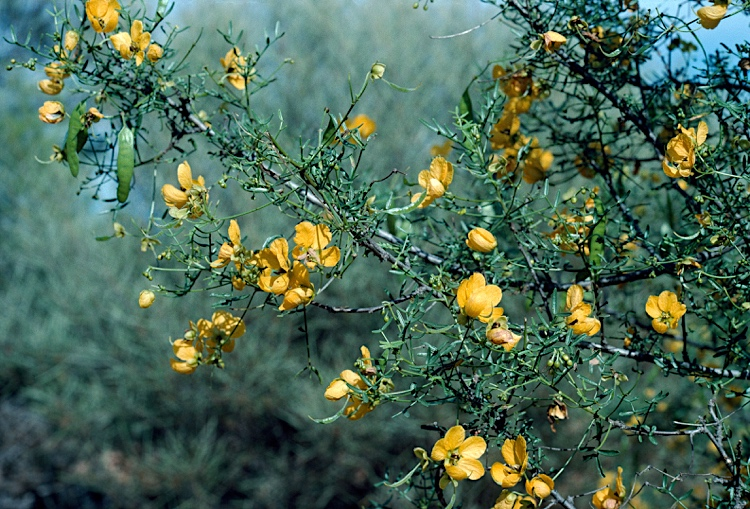
- Near the Shark Bay Road

Scientific classification
- Kingdom: Plantae
- Clade: Tracheophytes
- Clade: Angiosperms
- Clade: Eudicots
- Clade: Rosids
- Order: Fabales
- Family: Fabaceae
- Subfamily: Caesalpinioideae
- Genus: Senna
- Species: S. stricta

Binomial name
- Senna stricta (Randell) Randell

Synonyms
- Senna artemisioides subsp. stricta Randell

= Senna stricta =

Species of legume

Senna stricta is a species of flowering plant in the family Fabaceae and is endemic to western Australia. It is an erect shrub with pinnate leaves, usually with two to five pairs of linear leaflets, and yellow flowers arranged in umbels of two to five, with ten fertile stamens in each flower, and a flat pod.

== Description ==
Senna stricta is an erect shrub that typically grows to a height of up to 2 m (6 ft 7 in) and is glabrous and reddish glaucous. Its leaves are 25–40 mm (0.98–1.57 in) long on a petiole 6–15 mm (0.24–0.59 in) long. The leaves are pinnate, with two to five pairs of linear leaflets 10–25 mm (0.39–0.98 in) long and 1–2 mm (0.039–0.079 in) wide, spaced 6–9 mm (0.24–0.35 in) apart. The flowers are yellow and arranged in groups of two to five in leaf axils on a peduncle 8–20 mm (0.31–0.79 in) long, each flower on a pedicel 7–15 mm (0.28–0.59 in) long. The petals are 8–10 mm (0.31–0.39 in) long and there are ten fertile stamens in each flower, the anthers of two different lengths. Flowering occurs in winter, and the fruit is a flat pod about 80 mm (3.1 in) long and 15 mm (0.59 in) wide.

== Taxonomy ==
This species was first formally described in 1920 by Barbara Rae Randell who gave it the name Senna artemisioides subsp. stricta in the Journal of the Adelaide Botanic Gardens, from specimens collected near the Great Northern Highway, 22.5 km (14.0 mi) north of Roy Hill. In 1998, Randell raised it to species level as S. stricta in the Flora of Australia. The specific epithet (stricta) means 'straight', 'erect' or 'rigid'.

== Distribution and habitat ==
Senna stricta grows in red sandy or stony soils, mainly in the Avon Wheatbelt, Gascoyne, Geraldton Sandplains, Gibson Desert, Great Sandy Desert, Little Sandy Desert, Murchison and Pilbara bioregions of Western Australia, and the Northern Territory.

== Conservation status ==
Senna stricta is listed as "not threatened" by the Government of Western Australia Department of Biodiversity, Conservation and Attractions.
