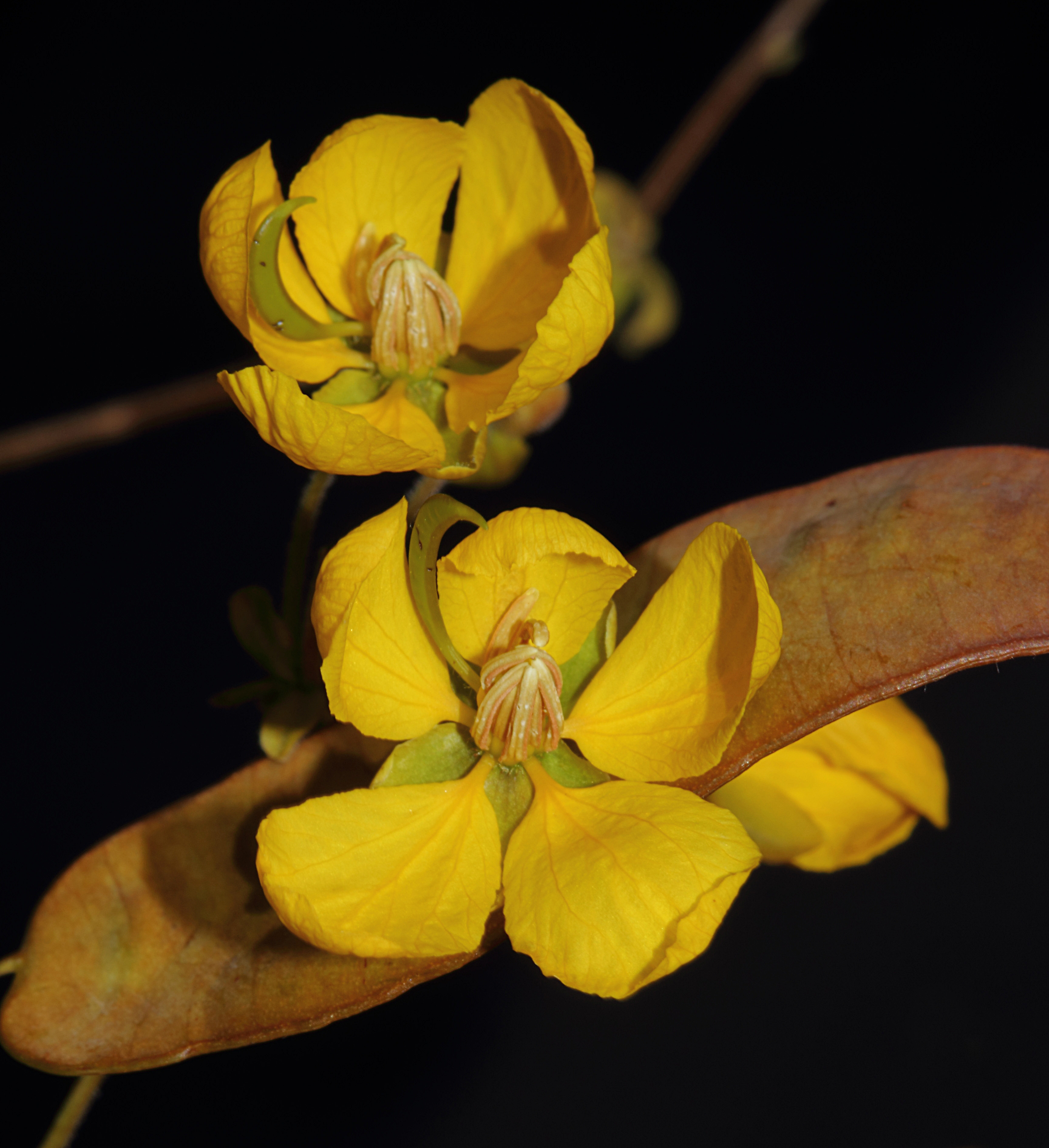

Scientific classification
- Kingdom: Plantae
- Clade: Tracheophytes
- Clade: Angiosperms
- Clade: Eudicots
- Clade: Rosids
- Order: Fabales
- Family: Fabaceae
- Subfamily: Caesalpinioideae
- Genus: Senna
- Species: S. pilocarina

Binomial name
- Senna pilocarina (Symon) Randell

Synonyms
- Cassia pilocarina Symon; Senna cardiosperma subsp. pilocarina (Symon) Randell

= Senna pilocarina =

Species of legume

Senna pilocarina is a species of flowering plant in the family Fabaceae and is endemic to inland Western Australia. It is a prostrate or upright, spreading shrub with pinnate leaves with five to nine pairs of oblong to wedge-shaped leaflets, and yellow flowers arranged in groups of four or five, with ten fertile stamens in each flower.

== Description ==
Senna pilocarina is a prostrate or upright, spreading shrub that typically grows to a height of 30–80 cm (12–31 in). Its leaves are 10–20 mm (0.39–0.79 in) long on a petiole 2–3 mm (0.079–0.118 in) long. The leaves are pinnate with five to nine pairs of oblong to wedge-shaped leaflets 5–12 mm (0.20–0.47 in) long and 2–3 mm (0.079–0.118 in) wide spaced 1–2 mm (0.039–0.079 in) apart. The flowers are yellow and arranged in umbels of four or five in upper leaf axils on a peduncle 25–35 mm (0.98–1.38 in) long, each flower on a pedicel 10–12 mm (0.39–0.47 in) long. The petals are about 6 mm (0.24 in) long and there are ten fertile stamens in each flower, the anthers 2–3 mm (0.079–0.118 in) long and of different lengths. Flowering occurs in winter and the fruit is a flat, straight pod about 40 mm (1.6 in) long and about 15 mm (0.59 in) wide.

== Taxonomy ==
This species was first formally described in 1966 by David Eric Symon who gave it the name Cassia pilocarina in Transactions of the Royal Society of South Australia, from specimens collected in the South Barlee Range in 1959. In 1998, Barbara Rae Randell transferred the species to Senna as Senna pilocarina in the Flora of Australia. The specific epithet (pilocarina) means "hairy-keeled".

== Distribution and habitat ==
Senna pilocarina grows on stony hills near the headwaters of the Ashburton River in the Gascoyne and Pilbara bioregions of inland Western Australia.

== Conservation status ==
Senna pilocarina is listed as "not threatened" by the Government of Western Australia Department of Biodiversity, Conservation and Attractions.
