= Acacia aneura var. macrocarpa =

Scientific classification
- Kingdom: Plantae
- Clade: Tracheophytes
- Clade: Angiosperms
- Clade: Eudicots
- Clade: Rosids
- Order: Fabales
- Family: Fabaceae
- Subfamily: Caesalpinioideae
- Clade: Mimosoid clade
- Genus: Acacia
- Species: A. aneura
- Variety: A. a. var. macrocarpa

Trinomial name
- Acacia aneura var. macrocarpa Randell

Variety of shrub or small tree

Acacia aneura var. macrocarpa is a perennial shrub native to Australia. Commonly found in the Northwest Region of Australia. Its common name is mulga.

== See also ==
- List of Acacia species
