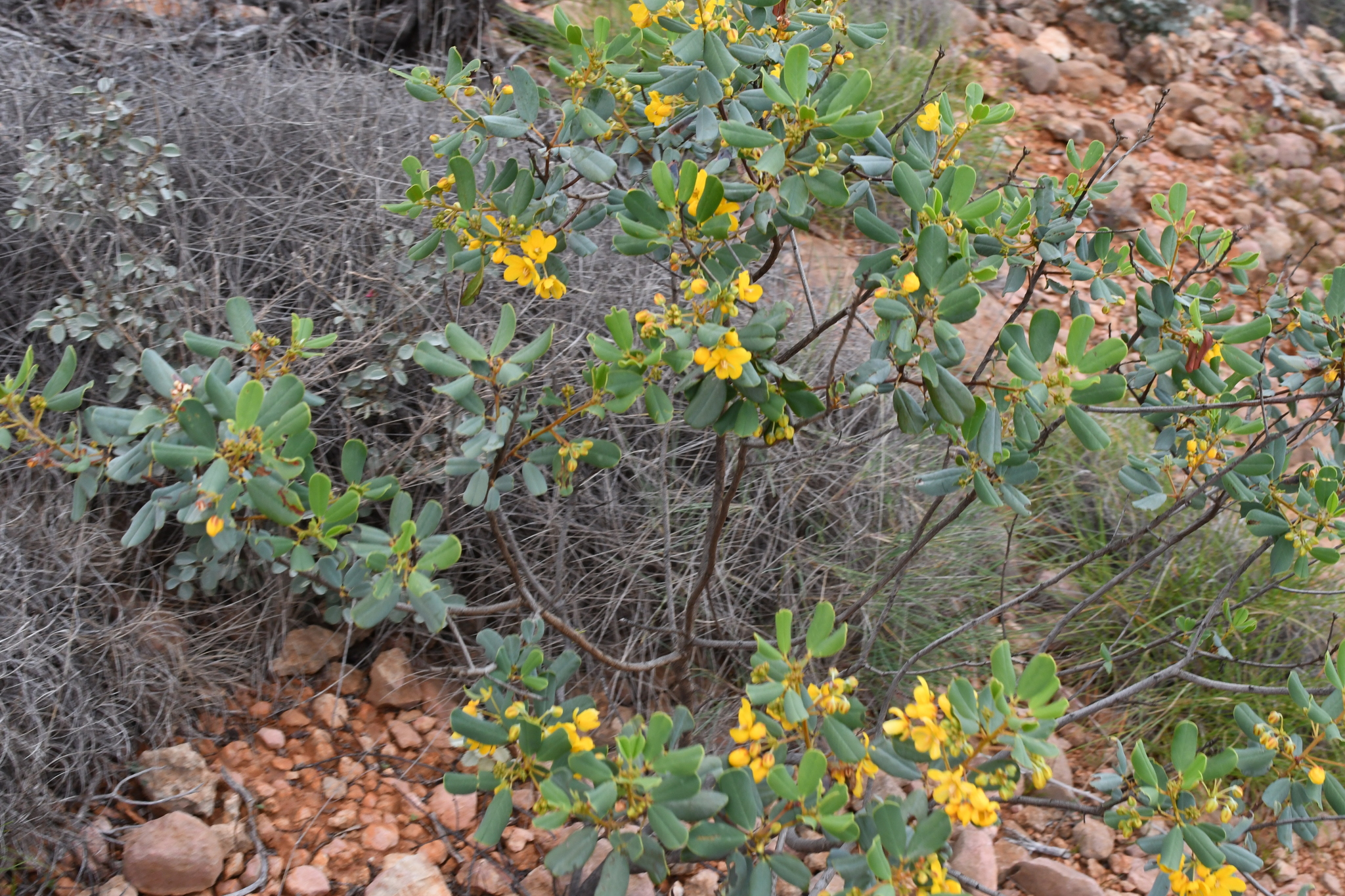

Scientific classification
- Kingdom: Plantae
- Clade: Tracheophytes
- Clade: Angiosperms
- Clade: Eudicots
- Clade: Rosids
- Order: Fabales
- Family: Fabaceae
- Subfamily: Caesalpinioideae
- Genus: Senna
- Species: S. ferraria

Binomial name
- Senna ferraria (Symon) Randell

Synonyms
- Cassia ferraria Symon; Senna glutinosa subsp. ferraria (Symon) Randell

= Senna ferraria =

Species of legume

Senna ferraria is a species of flowering plant in the family Fabaceae and is endemic to north-western Western Australia. It is an erect shrub with pinnate leaves with three to four pairs of broadly elliptic to egg-shaped leaflets, and yellow flowers arranged in groups of about twelve, with ten fertile stamens in each flower.

== Description ==
Senna ferraria is an erect shrub that typically grows to a height of 0.6–4 m (2 ft 0 in – 13 ft 1 in), its stems and foliage softly-hairy and sometimes glaucous. The leaves are pinnate, 60–80 mm (2.4–3.1 in) long on a petiole 5–15 mm (0.20–0.59 in) long with three or four pairs of broadly elliptic to egg-shaped leaflets, the narrower end towards the base, mostly 30–40 mm (1.2–1.6 in) long and 10–15 mm (0.39–0.59 in) wide. There are about two dark, sessile glands between the lowest pairs of leaflets. The flowers are yellow and arranged in upper leaf axils in groups of about twelve on a peduncle about 25 mm (0.98 in) long, each flower on a pedicel 15–20 mm (0.59–0.79 in) long. The petals are about 15 mm (0.59 in) long and there are ten fertile stamens, the anthers about 5–7 mm (0.20–0.28 in) long. Flowering occurs in winter, and the fruit is a flat pod 50–70 mm (2.0–2.8 in) long.

== Taxonomy ==
This species was first formally described in 1966 by David Eric Symon who gave it the name Cassia ferraria in the Transactions of the Royal Society of South Australia from specimens collected over the iron ore body at Mount Tom Price in 1963. In 1998, Barbara Rae Randell and Bryan Alwyn Barlow transferred the species to Senna as Senna ferraria in the Flora of Australia. The specific epithet (ferraria) means "pertaining to iron", referring to the type location.

== Distribution and habitat ==
Senna ferraria grows in arid shrubland in the Carnarvon, Gascoyne, Great Sandy Desert and Pilbara bioregions of north-western Western Australia.
