= Acacia minyura =

Scientific classification
- Kingdom: Plantae
- Clade: Tracheophytes
- Clade: Angiosperms
- Clade: Eudicots
- Clade: Rosids
- Order: Fabales
- Family: Fabaceae
- Subfamily: Caesalpinioideae
- Clade: Mimosoid clade
- Genus: Acacia
- Species: A. minyura

Binomial name
- Acacia minyura Randell
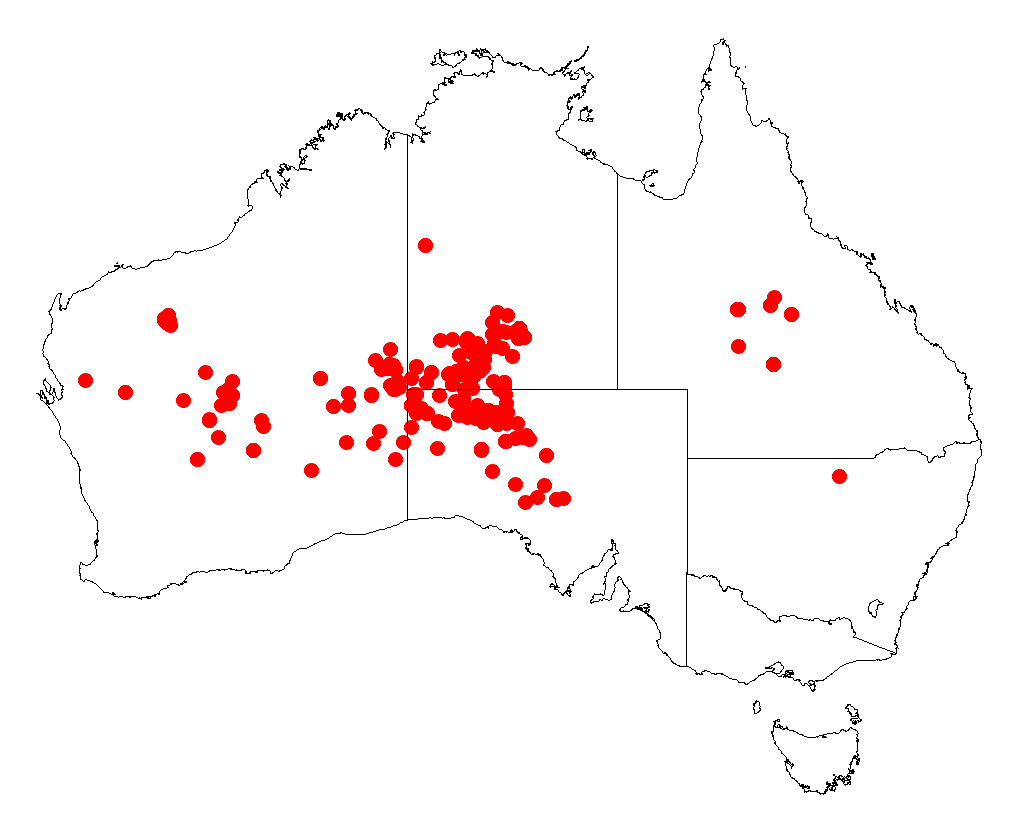
- Occurrence data from AVH

Synonyms
- Acacia aneura variant A; Racosperma minyura (Randell) Pedley; Acacia aneura auct. non F.Muell. ex Benth.: Whibley, D.J.E. & Symon, D.E. (1992)

Species of legume

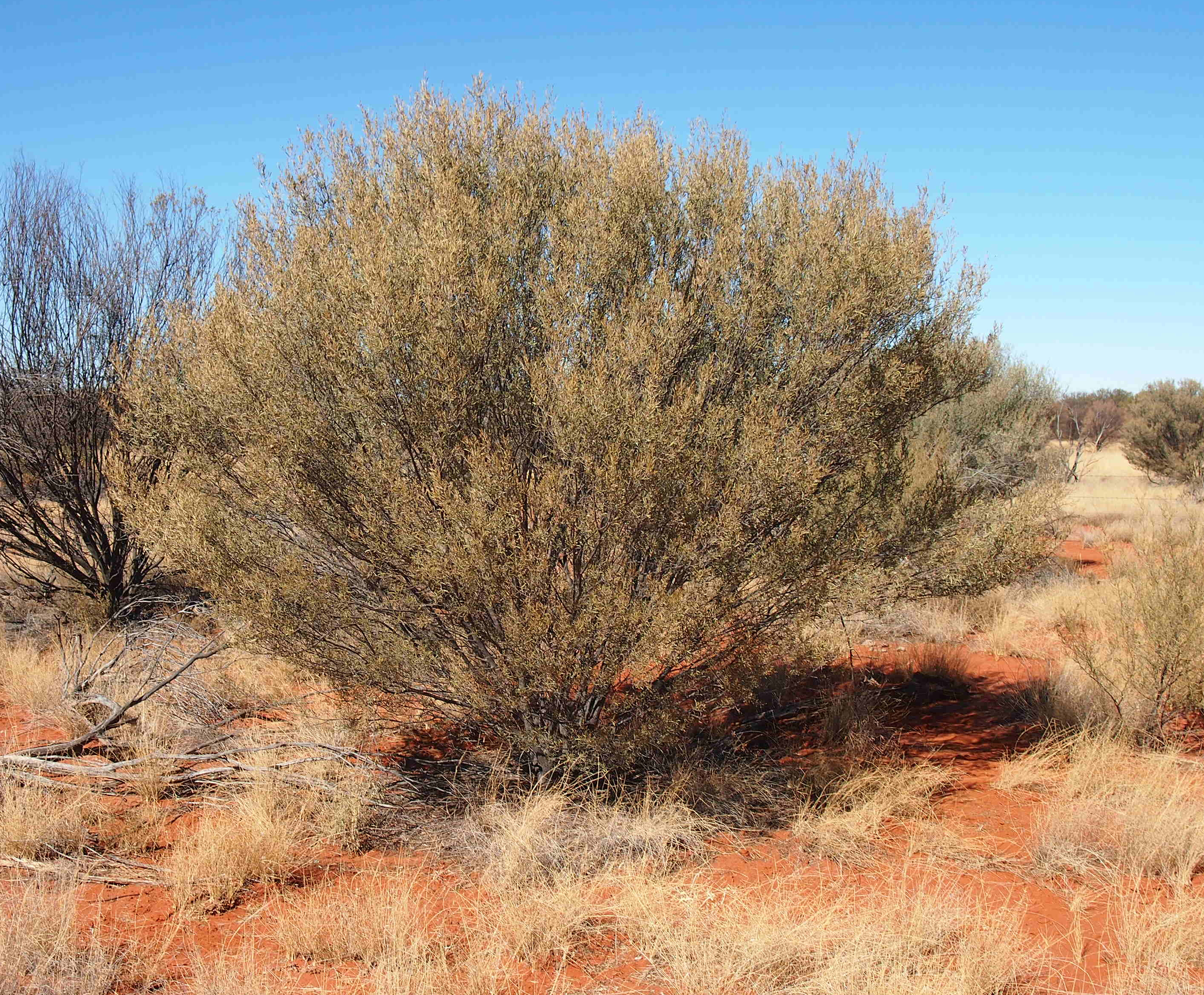
Habit

Acacia minyuracommonly known as desert mulga, shrubby desert mulga, or as minyura, kitir-kitir, or puyukara by the Ngaanyatjarra and Pitjantjatjara people, is a species of flowering plant in the family Fabaceae, and is endemic to inland areas of Australia. It is a rounded or inverted cone-shaped shrub, sometimes a tree, with its branchlets covered with a thick layer of resin, flat, straight, curved or s-shaped phyllodes, spikes of yellow flowers, and oblong, leathery pods.

== Description ==
Acacia minyura is a rounded or inverted cone-shaped shrub, sometimes a tree, that typically grows to about 1–5 m (3 ft 3 in – 16 ft 5 in) high and wide. Its branchlets have a thick covering of opaque and whitish grey resin when young, later often persisting as beaded white lines. The phyllodes are flat, straight to shallowly curved with one edge convex and the other straight, or shallowly s-shaped, elliptic to oblong, 5–25 mm (0.20–0.98 in) long, 2–4 mm (0.079–0.157 in) wide and greyish green to more or less glaucous with many prominent veins. The flowers are yellow, and borne in a spike 8–15 mm (0.31–0.59 in) long in axils on a peduncle 4–12 mm (0.16–0.47 in) long. Flowering has been recorded from March to October with a peak in September, and the pods are oblong, flat, mostly 15–35 mm (0.59–1.38 in) long, 1–2 mm (0.039–0.079 in) wide brown, leathery and dehiscent. The seeds are oblong, 4.5–6 mm (0.18–0.24 in) long and 2.5–3.5 mm (0.098–0.138 in) wide with a small, creamy, cap-shaped aril.

== Taxonomy ==
Acacia minyura was first formally described in 1992 by Barbara Rae Randell in the Journal of the Adelaide Botanic Gardens from specimens collected 24 km (15 mi) east of Uluru in 1979 by J.R. Maconochie. The specific epithet (minyura) is taken from one of the aboriginal names for the species.

== Distribution and habitat ==
Minyura grows in sandy soils, especially in dune swales and sometimes in shallow, rocky soils from the southern Pilbara and western fringe of the Gibson and Great Victoria Deserts in Western Australia, through the southern Northern Territory and central South Australia with three widely separated outliers in central-western Queensland.

== See also ==
List of Acacia species
