= Senna hamersleyensis =

Scientific classification
- Kingdom: Plantae
- Clade: Tracheophytes
- Clade: Angiosperms
- Clade: Eudicots
- Clade: Rosids
- Order: Fabales
- Family: Fabaceae
- Subfamily: Caesalpinioideae
- Genus: Senna
- Species: S. hamersleyensis

Binomial name
- Senna hamersleyensis (Symon) Randell

Synonyms
- Cassia hamersleyensis Symon; Senna artemisioides subsp. hamersleyensis (Symon) Randell

Species of legume

Senna hamersleyensis, commonly known as creeping senna, is a species of flowering plant in the family Fabaceae and is endemic to the north of Western Australia. It is an erect, spreading or prostrate shrub with pinnate leaves with two to four pairs of broadly elliptic to egg-shaped leaflets, and yellow flowers arranged in groups of four or five, with ten fertile stamens in each flower.

== Description ==
Senna hamersleyensis is an erect, spreading or prostrate, glaucous shrub that typically grows to a height of 15–60 cm (5.9–23.6 in). The leaves are 20–30 mm (0.79–1.18 in) long on a petiole 3–6 mm (0.12–0.24 in) long. The leaves are pinnate with two to four pairs of broadly elliptic to egg-shaped leaflets with the narrower end towards the base, 5–12 mm (0.20–0.47 in) long and 4–12 mm (0.16–0.47 in) wide, spaced about 6–8 mm (0.24–0.31 in) apart. The flowers are yellow and usually arranged in groups of four or five in upper leaf axils on a peduncle 40–90 mm (1.6–3.5 in) long, that is often longer than the leaves. Each flower is on a pedicel 10–15 mm (0.39–0.59 in) long. The petals are about 10 mm (0.39 in) long and there are ten fertile stamens in each flower, the anthers 3–4 mm (0.12–0.16 in) long and of different lengths. Flowering occurs from April to August and the fruit is a flat pod 40–60 mm (1.6–2.4 in) long and 10–15 mm (0.39–0.59 in) wide.

== Taxonomy ==
This species was first formally described in 1966 by David Eric Symon who gave it the name Cassia hamersleyensis in Transactions of the Royal Society of South Australia, from specimens collected in the Hamersley Range in 1963. In 1998, Barbara Rae Randell and Bryan Alwyn Barlow transferred the species to Senna as Senna hamersleyensis in the Flora of Australia. The specific epithet (hamersleyensis) means "native of the Hamersley Range".

== Distribution and habitat ==
Senna hamersleyensis grows on salt flats, near creeks and on plains and claypans in the Gascoyne, Little Sandy Desert, Murchison and Pilbara bioregions of northern Western Australia.

== Conservation status ==
Senna hamersleyensis is listed as "not threatened" by the Government of Western Australia Department of Biodiversity, Conservation and Attractions.

== Uses ==
Creeping senna is useful to pastoralists because it is palatable to livestock, and its presence indicates good pasture condition.
