= Senna cuthbertsonii =

Scientific classification
- Kingdom: Plantae
- Clade: Tracheophytes
- Clade: Angiosperms
- Clade: Eudicots
- Clade: Rosids
- Order: Fabales
- Family: Fabaceae
- Subfamily: Caesalpinioideae
- Genus: Senna
- Species: S. cuthbertsonii

Binomial name
- Senna cuthbertsonii (F.Muell.) Randell

Synonyms
- Cassia cuthbertsoni F.Muell. orth. var.; Cassia cuthbertsonii F.Muell.; Senna cardiosperma subsp. cuthbertsonii (F.Muell.) Randell

Species of legume

Senna cuthbertsonii is a species of flowering plant in the family Fabaceae and is endemic to northern Western Australia. It is a shrub with pinnate leaves with five to nine pairs of elliptic to narrowly egg-shaped leaflets, the flowers yellow and arranged in groups of two to four, with ten fertile stamens in each flower.

== Description ==
Senna cuthbertsonii is an upright or spreading, sometimes prostrate shrub that typically grows to a height of 40 cm (16 in) and is densely woolly-hairy, especially on the lower surface of the leaves. The leaves are pinnate, 40–50 mm (1.6–2.0 in) long on a petiole 6–8 mm (0.24–0.31 in) long with two to four pairs of elliptic to egg-shaped leaflets with the narrower end towards the base, 6–11 mm (0.24–0.43 in) long, 3–6 mm (0.12–0.24 in) wide and spaced about 8 mm (0.31 in) apart. There are three to five glands between the lower pairs of leaflets. The flowers are yellow and arranged in leaf axils in groups of two to four on a peduncle about 15 mm (0.59 in) long, each flower on a pedicel about 10 mm (0.39 in) long. The petals are about 8 mm (0.31 in) long and there are ten fertile stamens, the anthers 4–5 mm (0.16–0.20 in) long. Flowering is thought to occur in early summer, and the fruit is a flat, straight pod 30–40 mm (1.2–1.6 in) long, about 8 mm (0.31 in) wide.

== Taxonomy ==
This species was first formally described in 1888 by Ferdinand von Mueller who gave it the name Cassia cuthbertsonii in The Victorian Naturalist from specimens collected on the upper Ashburton River by Walter Cuthbertson. In 1998, Barbara Rae Randell and Bryan Alwyn Barlow transferred the species to Senna as Senna cuthbertsonii in the Flora of Australia. The specific epithet (cuthbertsonii) honours the collector of the type specimens.

== Distribution and habitat ==
Senna cuthbertsonii grows on stony hillsides and in creek beds in the Gascoyne bioregion of northern Western Australia
