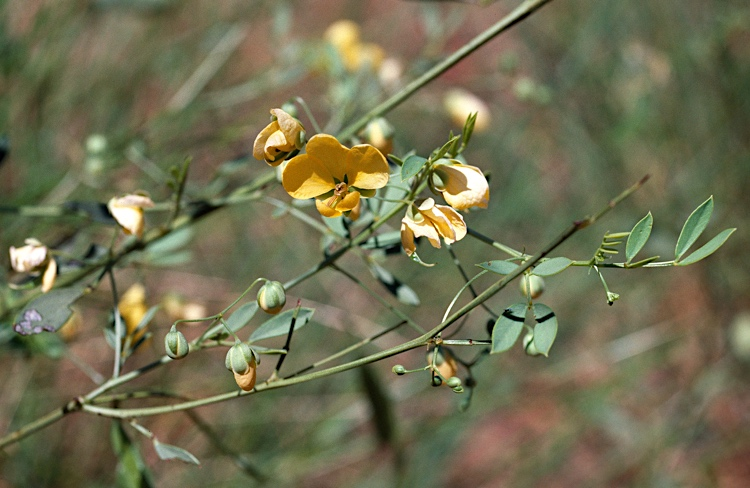
- In Keep River National Park

Scientific classification
- Kingdom: Plantae
- Clade: Tracheophytes
- Clade: Angiosperms
- Clade: Eudicots
- Clade: Rosids
- Order: Fabales
- Family: Fabaceae
- Subfamily: Caesalpinioideae
- Genus: Senna
- Species: S. oligoclada

Binomial name
- Senna oligoclada (F.Muell.) Randell

Synonyms
- Cassia oligoclada F.Muell.

= Senna oligoclada =

Species of legume

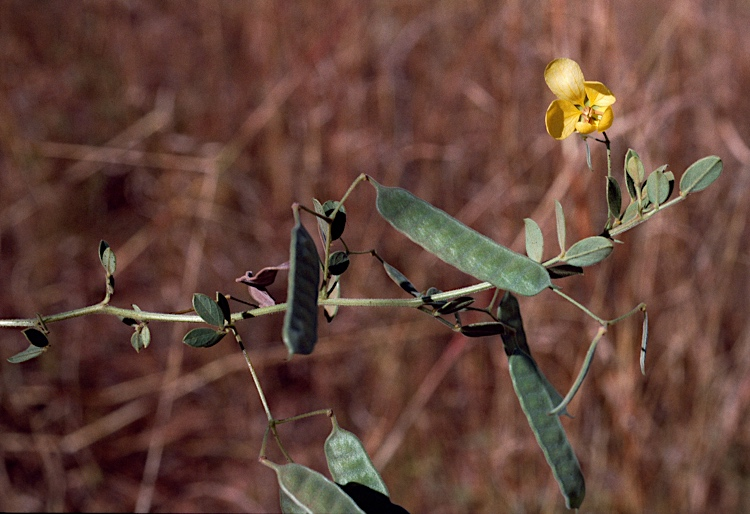
Mature fruit

Senna oligoclada is a species of flowering plant in the family Fabaceae and is endemic to northern Australia. It is an erect shrub with pinnate leaves with one to three pairs of elliptic to egg-shaped leaflets, and yellow flowers arranged in groups of three to five with ten fertile stamens in each flower.

== Description ==
Senna oligoclada is an erect shrub that typically grows to a height of up to 3 m (9.8 ft). Its leaves are pinnate, 30–60 mm (1.2–2.4 in) long with one to thee pairs of elliptic to egg-shaped leaflets with the narrowe end towards the base, the leaflets 20–30 mm (0.79–1.18 in) long and 8–15 mm (0.31–0.59 in) wide with glands between each pair of leaflets. The flowers are yellow and borne in leaf axils in groups of three to five, with ten fertile stamens in each flower, the filaments of differing lengths, from 0.5 to 1 mm (0.020 to 0.039 in) long. The fruit is a flattened pod 30–50 mm (1.2–2.0 in) long and about 10 mm (0.39 in) wide.

== Taxonomy ==
This species was first formally described in 1862 by Ferdinand von Mueller who gave it the name Cassia oligoclda in his Fragmenta Phytographiae Australiae from specimens collected by John McDouall Stuart. In 1989, Barbara Rae Randell transferred the species to Senna as Senna oligoclada in the Journal of the Adelaide Botanic Garden. The specific epithet (oligoclada) means "few shoots".

== Distribution and habitat ==
Senna oligoclada grows near sandy watercourses in the Kimberley region of Western Australia, in the Northern Territory, and in north-western Queensland.
