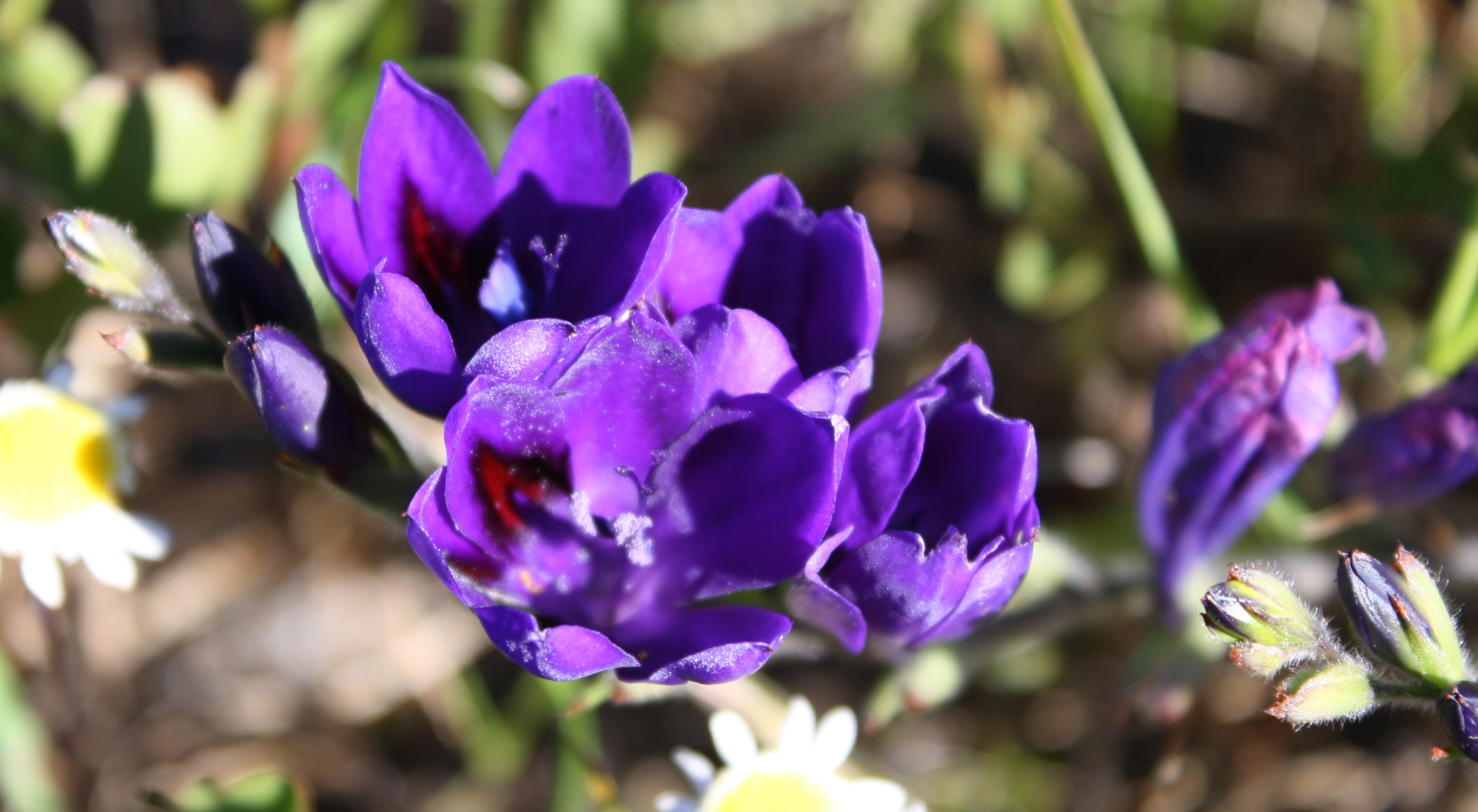

Scientific classification
- Kingdom: Plantae
- Clade: Tracheophytes
- Clade: Angiosperms
- Clade: Monocots
- Order: Asparagales
- Family: Iridaceae
- Genus: Babiana
- Species: B. angustifolia

Binomial name
- Babiana angustifolia Sweet

= Babiana angustifolia =

Species of flowering plant

Babiana angustifolia is a plant species in the family Iridaceae.
