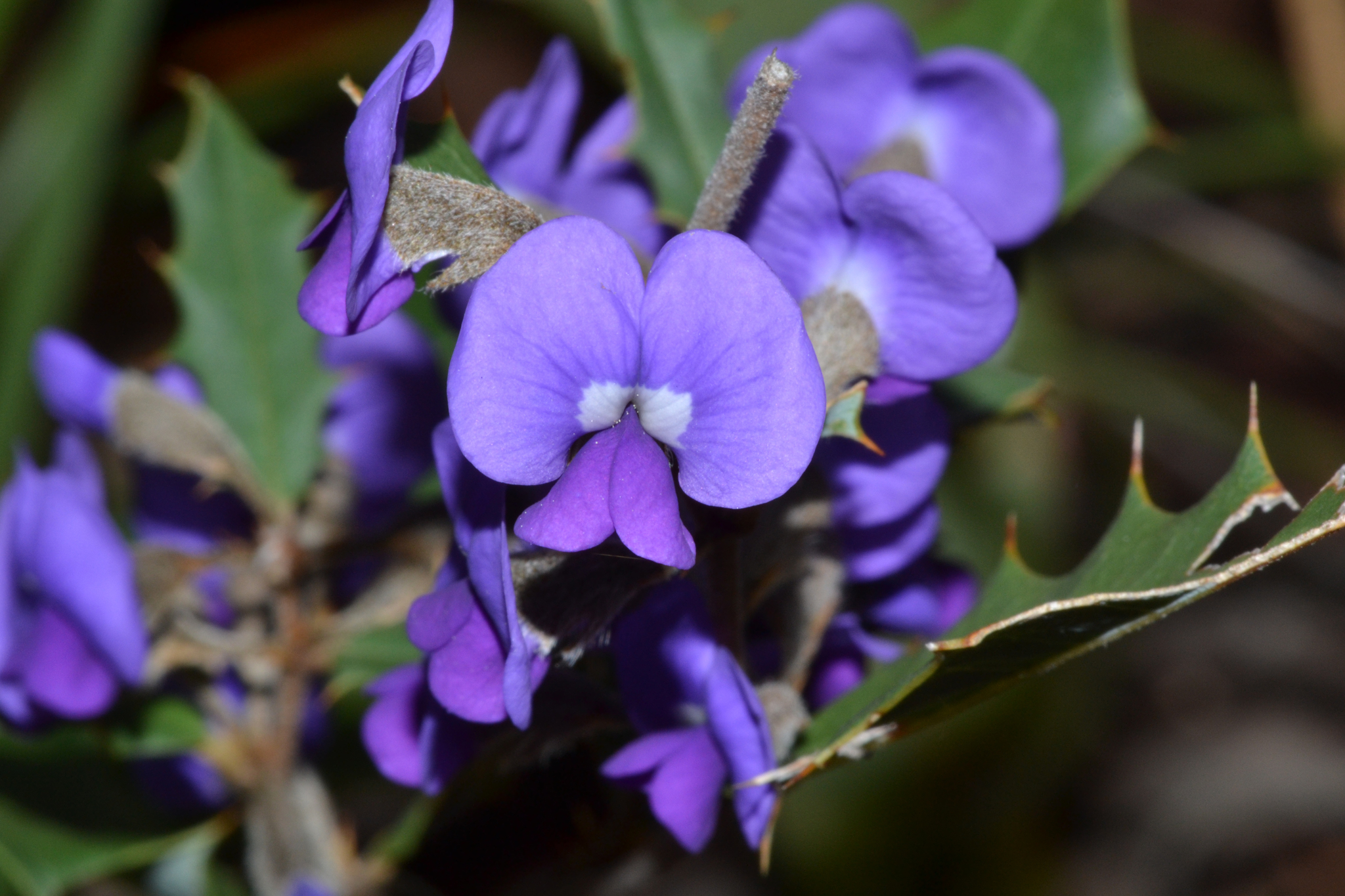

Scientific classification
- Kingdom: Plantae
- Clade: Tracheophytes
- Clade: Angiosperms
- Clade: Eudicots
- Clade: Rosids
- Order: Fabales
- Family: Fabaceae
- Subfamily: Faboideae
- Genus: Hovea
- Species: H. chorizemifolia

Binomial name
- Hovea chorizemifolia (Sweet) DC.

Synonyms
- List: Hovea chorizemaefolia DC. orth. var.; Hovea chorozemaefolia Lindl. orth. var.; Hovea ilicifolia Sweet nom. inval., nom. nud.; Hovea ilicifolia A.Cunn.; Plagiolobium chorizemaefolium Sweet orth. var.; Plagiolobium chorizemaefolium var. dentatum Meisn. orth. var.; Plagiolobium chorizemaefolium var. subintegrum Meisn. orth. var.; Plagiolobium chorizemifolium (DC.) Sweet; Plagiolobium chorizemifolium (DC.) Sweet var. chorizemifolium; Plagiolobium chorizemifolium var. dentatum Meisn.; Plagiolobium chorizemifolium var. subintegrum Meisn.; Plagiolobium ilicifolium Sweet nom. illeg.

= Hovea chorizemifolia =

Holly-leaved hovea

Species of legume

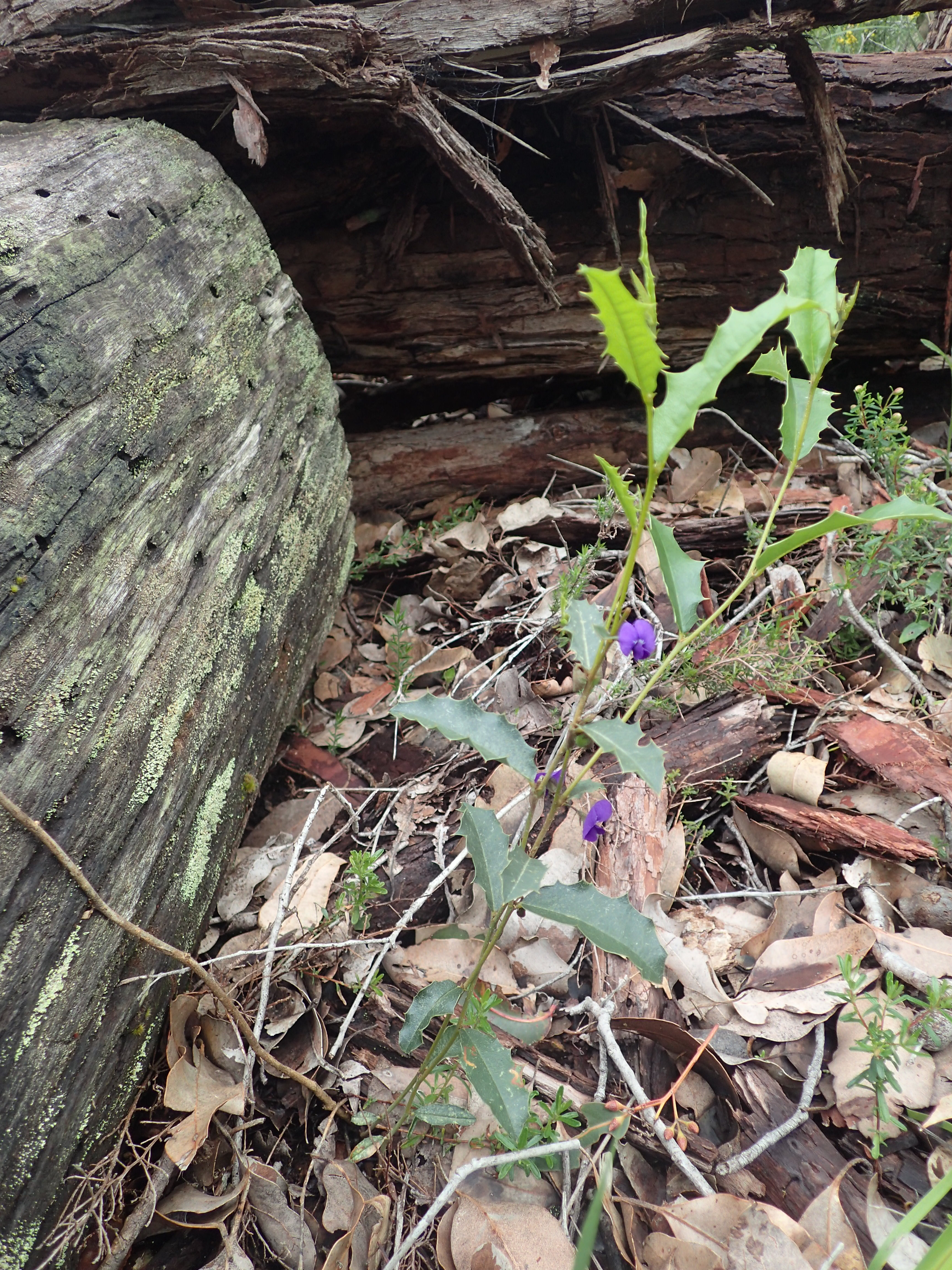
Habit near Margaret River

Hovea chorizemifolia, commonly known as the holly-leaved hovea, is a species of flowering plant in the family Fabaceae and is endemic to the south-west of Western Australia. It is a small, upright shrub with prickly, green leaves and blue-purple pea flowers.

== Description ==
Hovea chorizemifolia is an erect, slender and prickly shrub that typically grows to a height of 0.1 to 0.6 metres (0 to 2 ft), and needle-shaped, hairy stems. The leaves are arranged alternately, flat, hairy, 20–80 mm (0.79–3.15 in) long and 4.5–5.5 mm (0.18–0.22 in) wide on a pedicel 4.5–6.5 mm (0.18–0.26 in) long. The calyx is 6–7.2 mm (0.24–0.28 in) long with simple hairs. The purple-blue corolla is 12.5–18.5 mm (0.49–0.73 in) long, with purple or blue markings. The standard petal is 10–17.5 mm (0.39–0.69 in) long and smooth, wings are 9.5–15 mm (0.37–0.59 in) long, and the keel 7–7.5 mm (0.28–0.30 in) long and smooth. Flowering occurs from May to October and the fruit is a round pod.

== Taxonomy and naming ==
Hovea chorizemifolia was first formally described by the botanist Augustin Pyramus de Candolle, in 1825 in his Prodromus Systematis Naturalis Regni Vegetabilis. The classification of the species has been revised many times including by Robert Sweet in 1827 as Plagiolobium chorizemifolium in Flora Australasica and as Hovea chorozemaefolia by John Lindley in 1832 in Edwards's Botanical Register. The specific epithet (chorizemifolia), derives from Chorizema and the latin, folium, meaning leaf and thus means leaves resembling those of Chorizema.

== Distribution ==
It occurs on hills, breakaways and granite outcrops in the South West, Peel and Great Southern regions of Western Australia where it grows in sandy and gravelly lateritic soils and often as part of jarrah forest communities.
