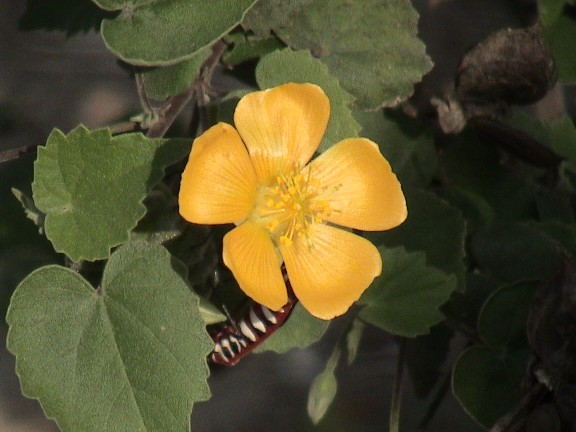

Scientific classification
- Kingdom: Plantae
- Clade: Tracheophytes
- Clade: Angiosperms
- Clade: Eudicots
- Clade: Rosids
- Order: Malvales
- Family: Malvaceae
- Genus: Abutilon
- Species: A. indicum

Binomial name
- Abutilon indicum (L.) Sweet

Synonyms
- Sida indica L.

= Abutilon indicum =

Species of plant

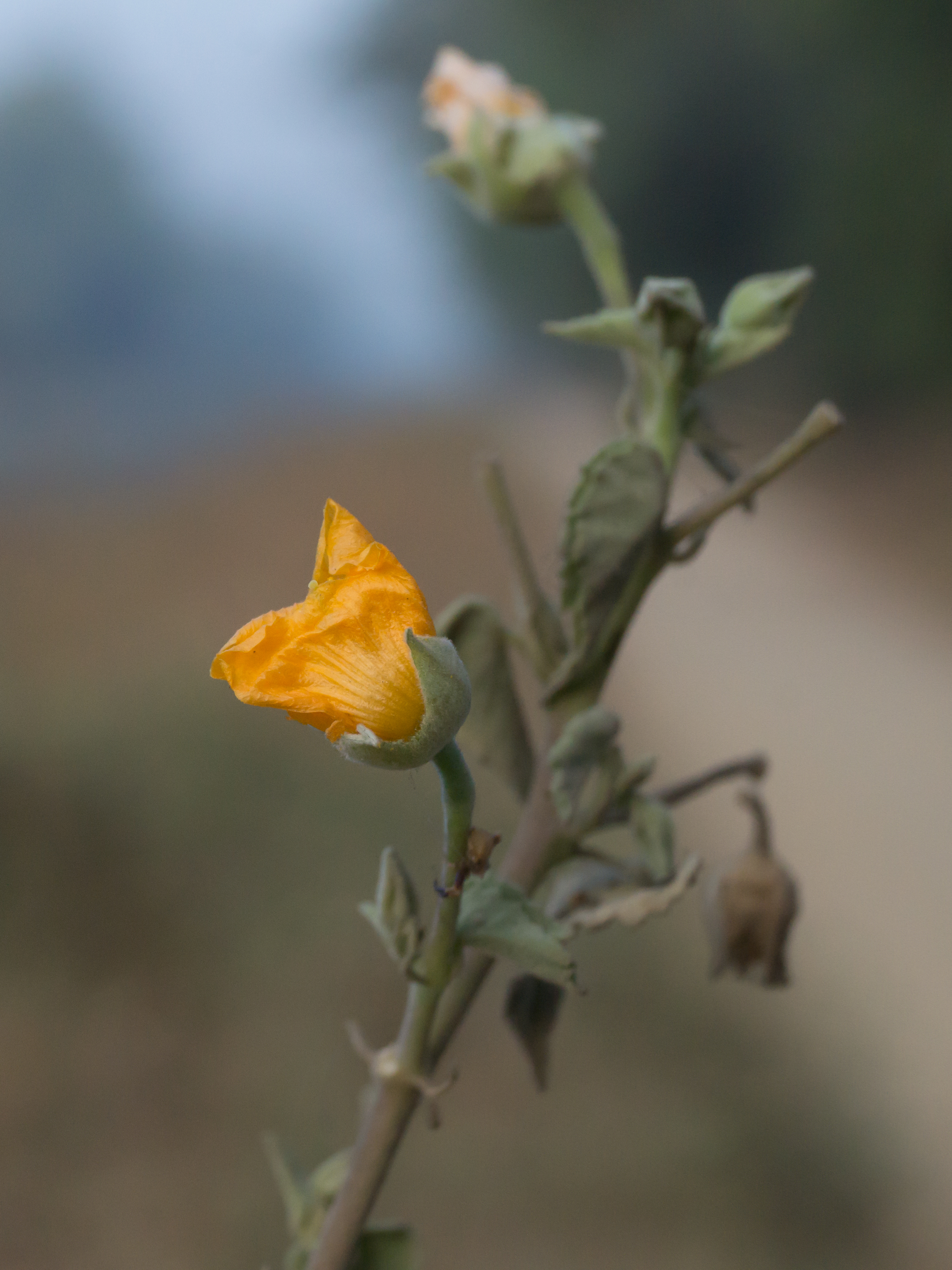
Indian abutilon

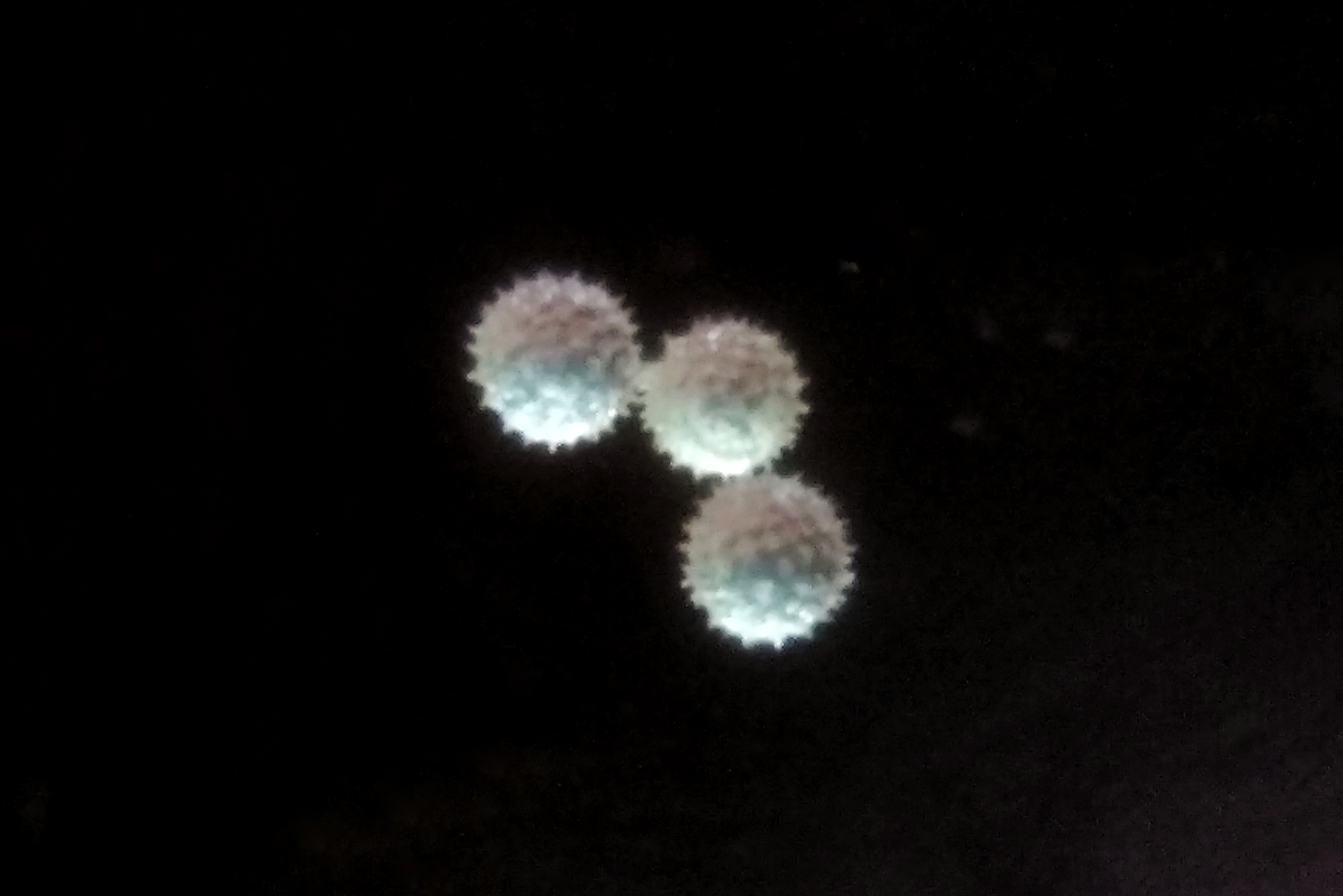
Pollen grains of Abutilon indicum

Abutilon indicum (Indian abutilon, Indian mallow) is a small shrub in the family Malvaceae, native to tropical and subtropical regions. This plant is a valuable medicinal and ornamental plant, its roots and leaves being used for curing fevers. It has been widely introduced outside of its native range, and is considered invasive on certain tropical islands.

== Distribution ==
The species occurs in a number of tropical and subtropical zones. An example occurrence is within parts of the Great Barrier Reef islands of the Coral Sea. It's also found in tropical zones in the Indian subcontinent, such as parts of Tamil Nadu.

== Traditional medicine ==
In traditional medicine, A. indicum various parts of the plant are used as a demulcent, aphrodisiac, laxative, diuretic, sedative, astringent, expectorant, tonic, anti-convulsant, anti-inflammatory, anthelmintic, and analgesic and to treat leprosy, ulcers, headaches, gonorrhea, and bladder infection. The whole plant is uprooted, dried and is powdered. In ancient days, maidens were made to consume a spoonful of this powder with a spoonful of honey, once in a day, for 6 months until the day of marriage, for a safe and quick pregnancy.

The plant is commonly used in Siddha medicines. The root, bark, flowers, leaves and seeds are all used for medicinal purposes by Tamils. The leaves are used as adjunct to medicines used for pile complaints. The flowers are used to increase semen in men.

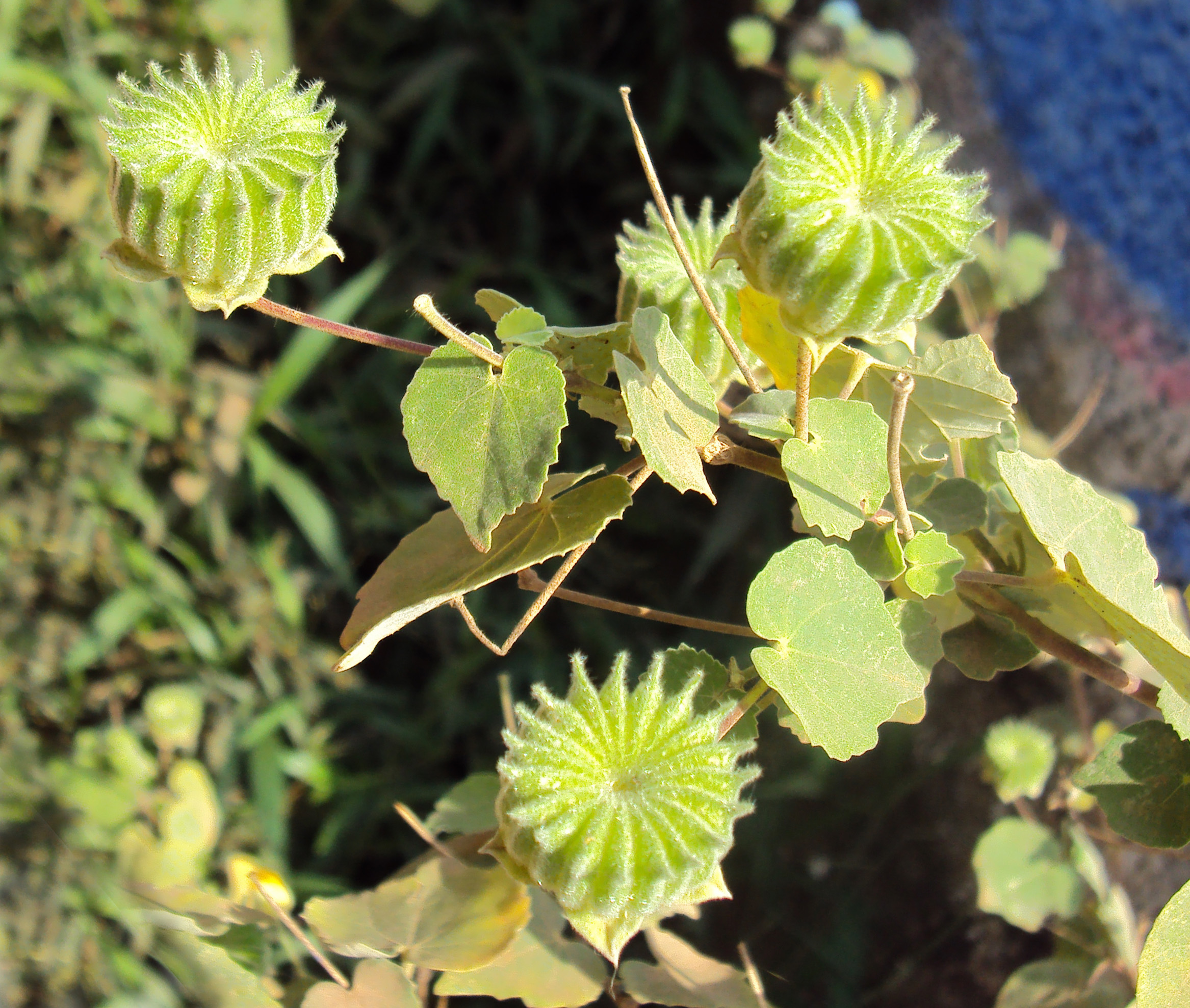
Abutilon indicum.

== Chemistry ==
β-Sitosterol is present in A. indicum and a petroleum ether extract has larvicidal properties against the mosquito larvae Culex quinquefasciatus. A methanol extract of A. indicum has some antimicrobial properties.
