= Robert Sweet (botanist) =

English botanist, horticulturist and ornithologist

- Born: 1783; Cockington, Devonshire, England
- Died: 20 January 1835 (aged 51–52); Chelsea, London, England
- Scientific career
- Fields: Botany, horticulture and ornithology
- Workplaces: Chelsea Nursery
- Author abbrev. (botany): Sweet

Robert Sweet (1783–20 January 1835) was an English botanist, horticulturist and ornithologist.

== Background ==
Born at Cockington near Torquay, Devonshire, England in 1783, Sweet worked as a gardener from the age of sixteen, and became foreman or partner in a series of nurseries. He was associated with nurseries at Stockwell, Fulham and Chelsea. In 1812 he joined Colvills, the famous Chelsea nursery, and was elected a fellow of the Linnean Society. By 1818 he was publishing horticultural and botanical works.

Sweet published a number of illustrated works on plants cultivated in British gardens and hothouses. The plates were mainly drawn by Edwin Dalton Smith (1800–1883), a botanical artist, who was attached to the Royal Botanic Gardens, Kew. His works include Hortus Suburbanus Londinensis (1818), Geraniaceae (five volumes) (1820–30), Cistineae, Sweet's Hortus Britannicus (1826–27), Flora Australasica (1827–28) and British Botany (with H. Weddell) (1831).

He died at Chelsea, London in 20 January 1835.

=== Theft accusations ===
Sweet was charged with receiving a batch of plants allegedly stolen from the Royal Botanic Gardens at Kew. It was suggested that this was an attempt to frame him by an official at Kew whom Sweet had criticised. He was acquitted after a well-publicised trial.

Sweet received high praise from his contemporaries at his trial and was described as possibly the first practical botanist.

== Publications ==
- Sweet, Robert (1823–1829). The British Flower Garden : coloured figures & descriptions of the most ornamental & curious hardy herbaceous plants. Drawings by Edwin Dalton Smith. London: W. Simpkin and R. Marshall.
- Sweet, Robert (1825–1830). Cistineae : the natural order of Cistus or Rock-rose. London: James Ridgeway.
- British Warblers

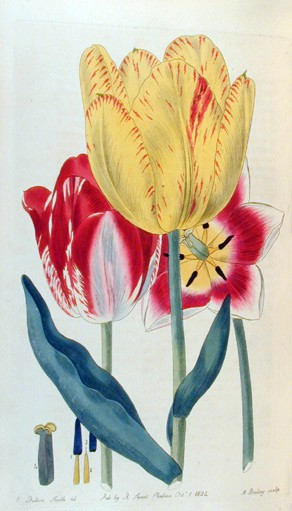
Tulips by Edwin Dalton Smith from "The British Flower Garden" by Robert Sweet

Sweet is the author of a number of plants, including:

- Abutilon auritum (Link) Sweet
- Abutilon grandifolium (Willd.) Sweet
- Abutilon indicum (Link) Sweet – Indian lantern flower
- Acacia leucolobia Sweet
- Agonis flexuosa (Willd.) Sweet – Peppermint
- Argemone ochroleuca Sweet – Mexican poppy
- Babiana angustifolia Sweet
- Banksia dryandroides Sweet – Dryandra-leaved Banksia
- Bellevalia romana (L.) Sweet
- Callistemon glaucus (Bonpl.) Sweet
- Coreopsis grandiflora Sweet – American tickseed
- Cyanotis axillaris (L.) Sweet
- Dillwynia pungens (Sweet) Benth.
- Hakea ferruginea Sweet
- Hovea chorizemifolia (Sweet) DC. – Holly-leaved Hovea
- Ipomoea cairica (L.) Sweet – Coast morning glory
- Lablab purpureus (L.) Sweet – Lablab bean
- Lachenalia mutabilis Sweet
- Moraea flaccida Sweet – One-leaf cape tulip
- Orthrosanthus multiflorus Sweet – Morning Iris
- Penaeaceae Sweet ex Guillemin
- Senna barclayana (Sweet) Randell
- Sphenotoma gracile (R.Br.) Sweet – Swamp paper-heath
- Wahlenbergia stricta (R.Br.) Sweet – Austral bluebell
