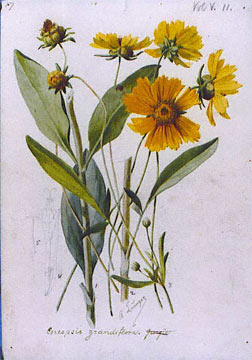
- Watercolor circa 1895

Scientific classification
- Kingdom: Plantae
- Clade: Tracheophytes
- Clade: Angiosperms
- Clade: Eudicots
- Clade: Asterids
- Order: Asterales
- Family: Asteraceae
- Genus: Coreopsis
- Species: C. grandiflora

Binomial name
- Coreopsis grandiflora Hogg ex Sweet 1826 not Nutt. ex Chapm. 1860

Synonyms
- Coreopsis boykiniana Nutt.; Coreopsis harveyana A.Gray; Coreopsis heterolepis Sherff; Coreopsis heterophylla Nutt. 1841 not Cav. 1795; Coreopsis longipes Hook.; Coreopsis saxicola Alexander

= Coreopsis grandiflora =

Species of flowering plant

Coreopsis grandiflora is a North American species of perennial plant in the family Asteraceae. The common name is large-flowered tickseed. It is found in eastern Canada (Quebec, Ontario, New Brunswick) and much of the United States, especially the south-central part of the country (Oklahoma, Arkansas, etc.). The species is widely cultivated in China and naturalized there.

Coreopsis grandiflora is a perennial herb sometimes greater than 60 cm (2 feet) tall. It produces yellow ray and disc flowers. Its native habitats include prairies, glades, open woods, thickets, roadsides and open ground. The Latin specific epithet grandiflora means large-flowered. The plant attracts bees and butterflies.

In the UK the cultivar 'Early Sunrise' has received the Royal Horticultural Society's Award of Garden Merit.

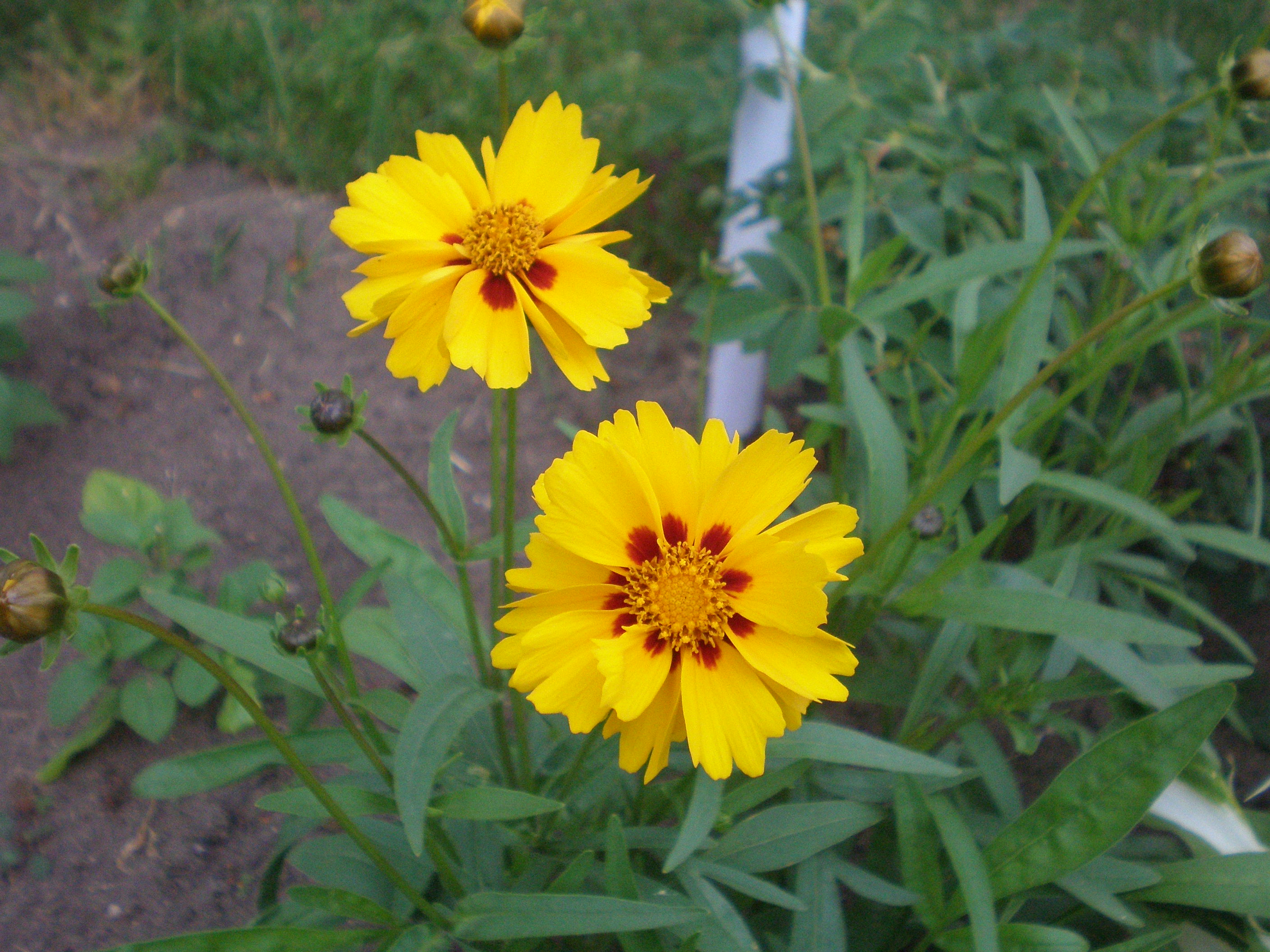

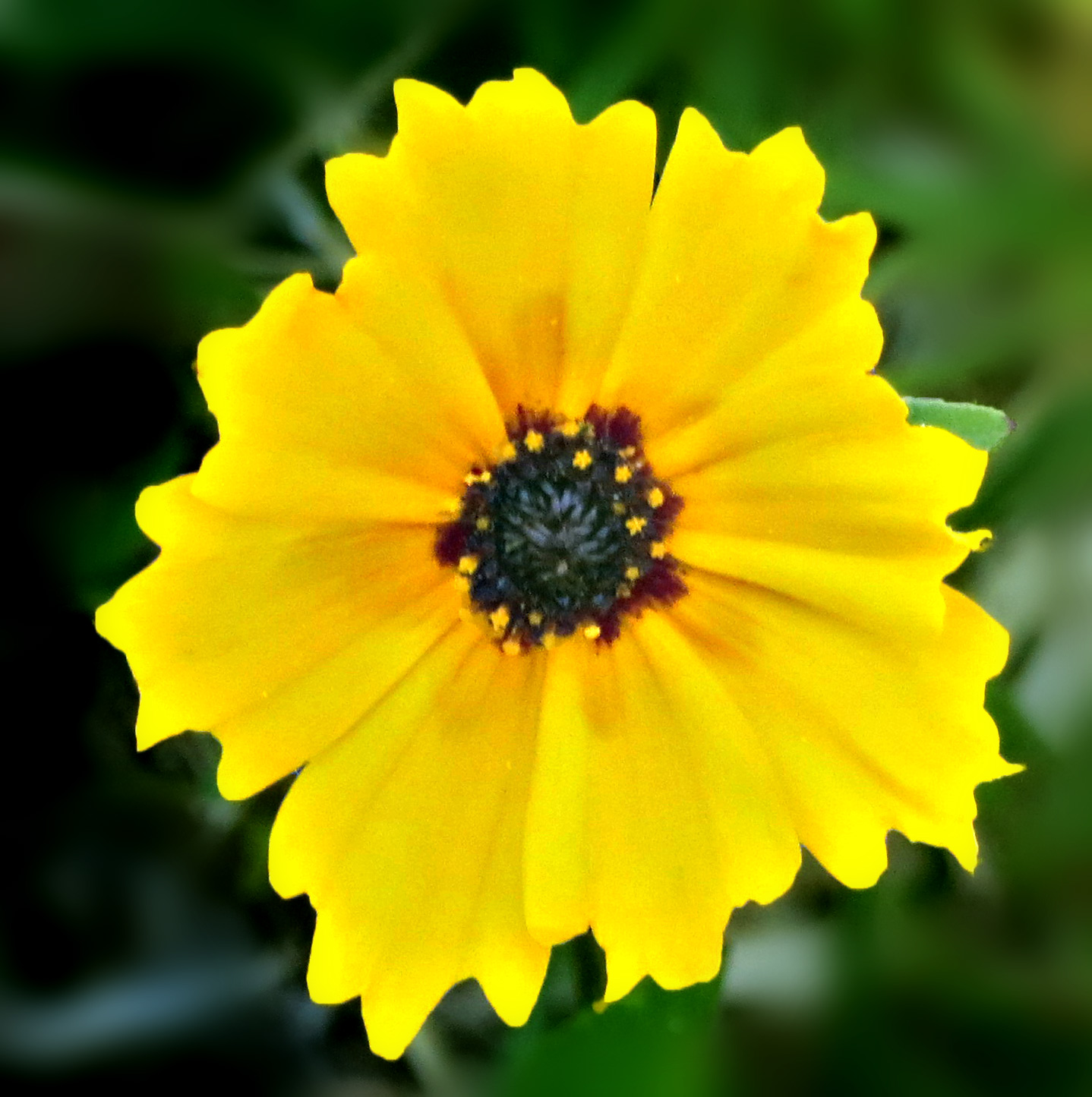
Coreopsis grandiflora 'Sunburst'
