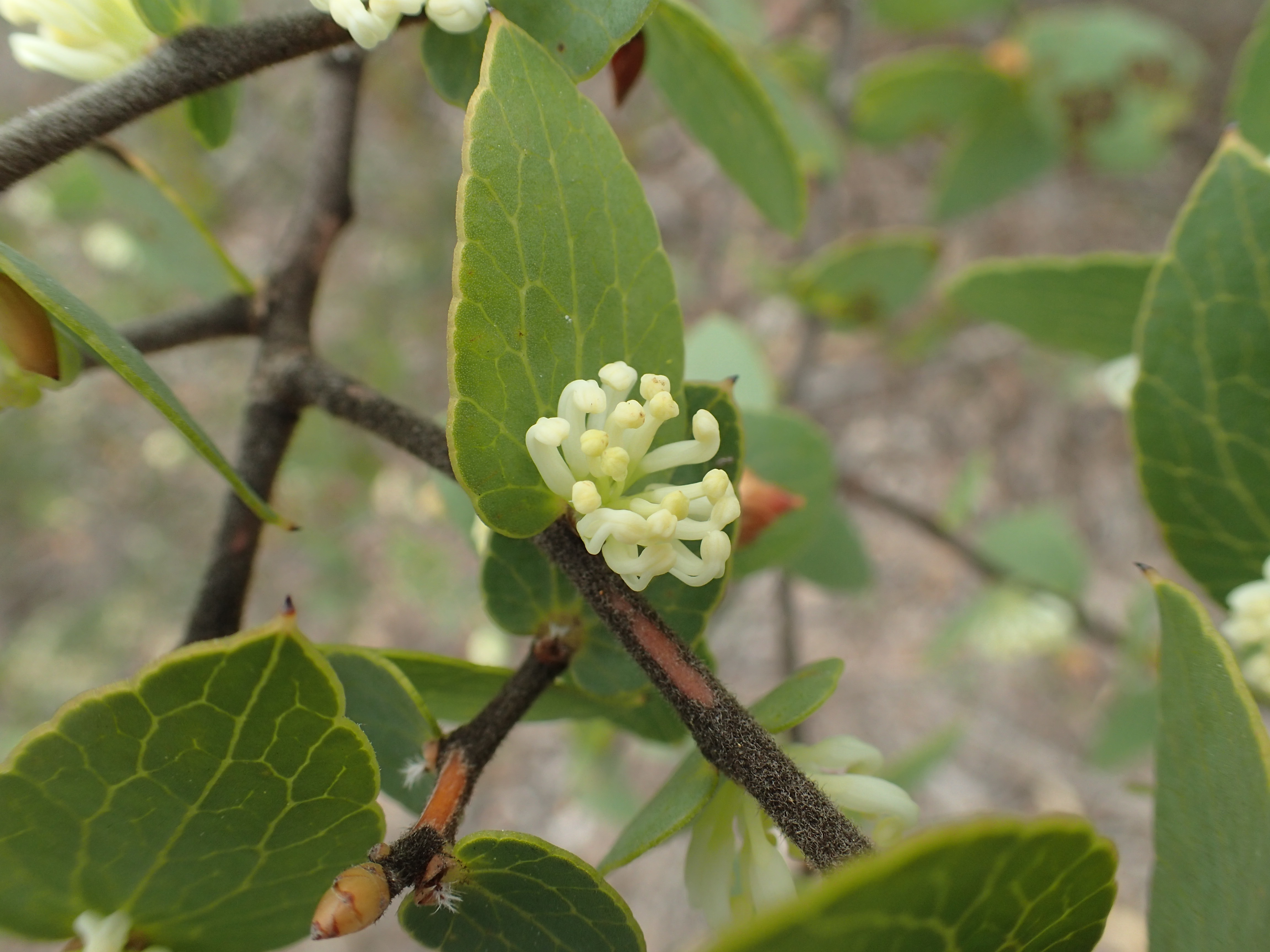
- Hakea ferruginea growing near the Stirling Range National Park

Scientific classification
- Kingdom: Plantae
- Clade: Tracheophytes
- Clade: Angiosperms
- Clade: Eudicots
- Order: Proteales
- Family: Proteaceae
- Genus: Hakea
- Species: H. ferruginea

Binomial name
- Hakea ferruginea Sweet
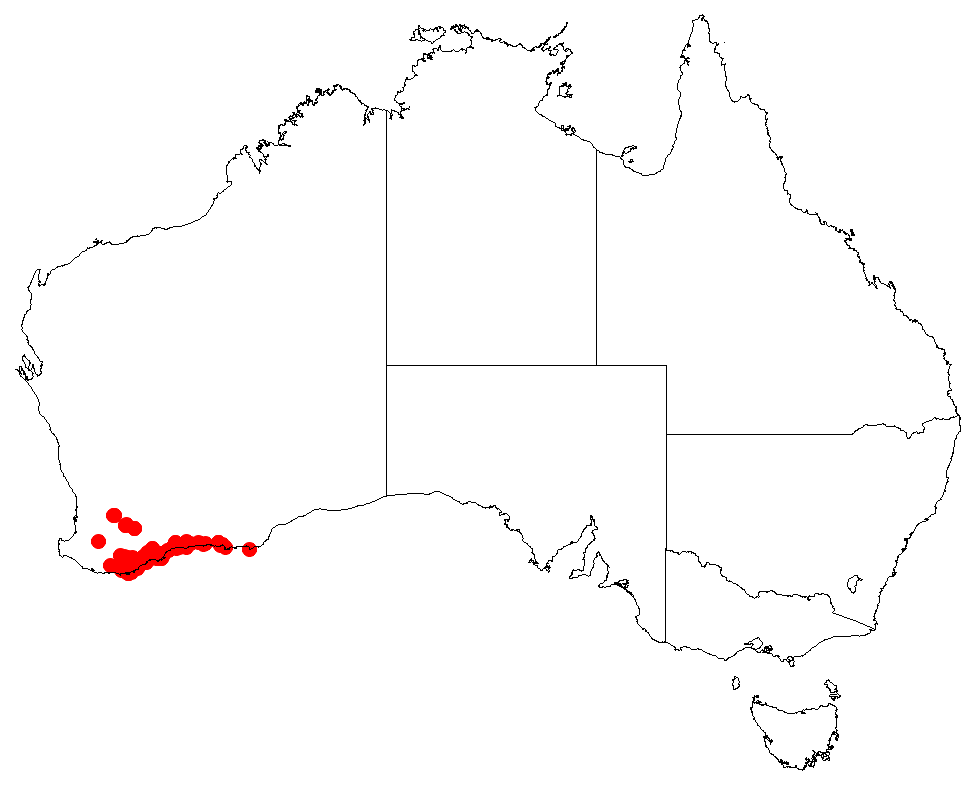
- Occurrence data from AVH

= Hakea ferruginea =

Species of shrub endemic to Western Australia

Hakea ferruginea, commonly known as rusty hakea, is shrub in the family Proteaceae. It has flat leaves and white to cream-coloured flowers from late winter to mid-summer and is endemic to Western Australia.

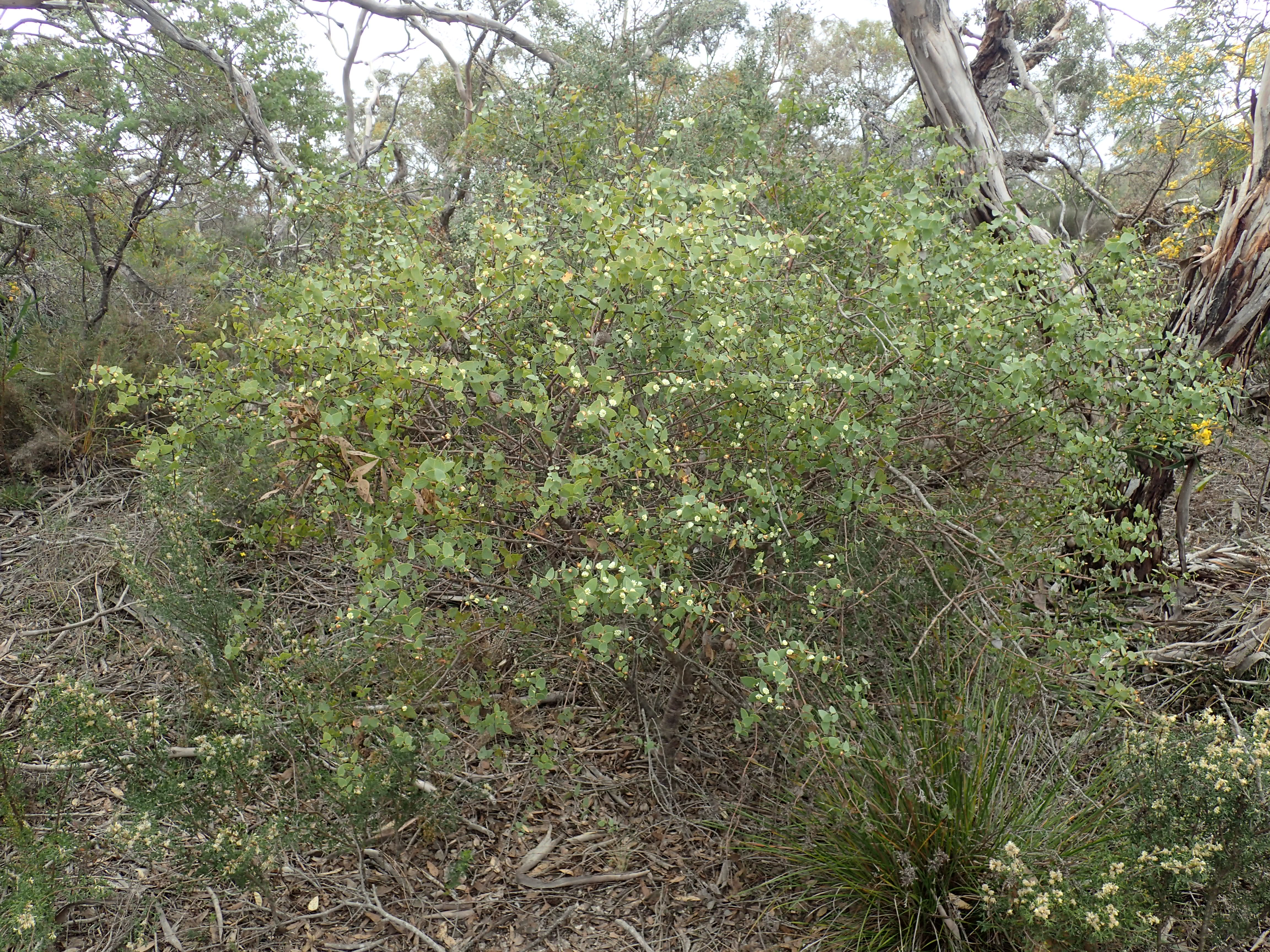
Rusty hakea habit

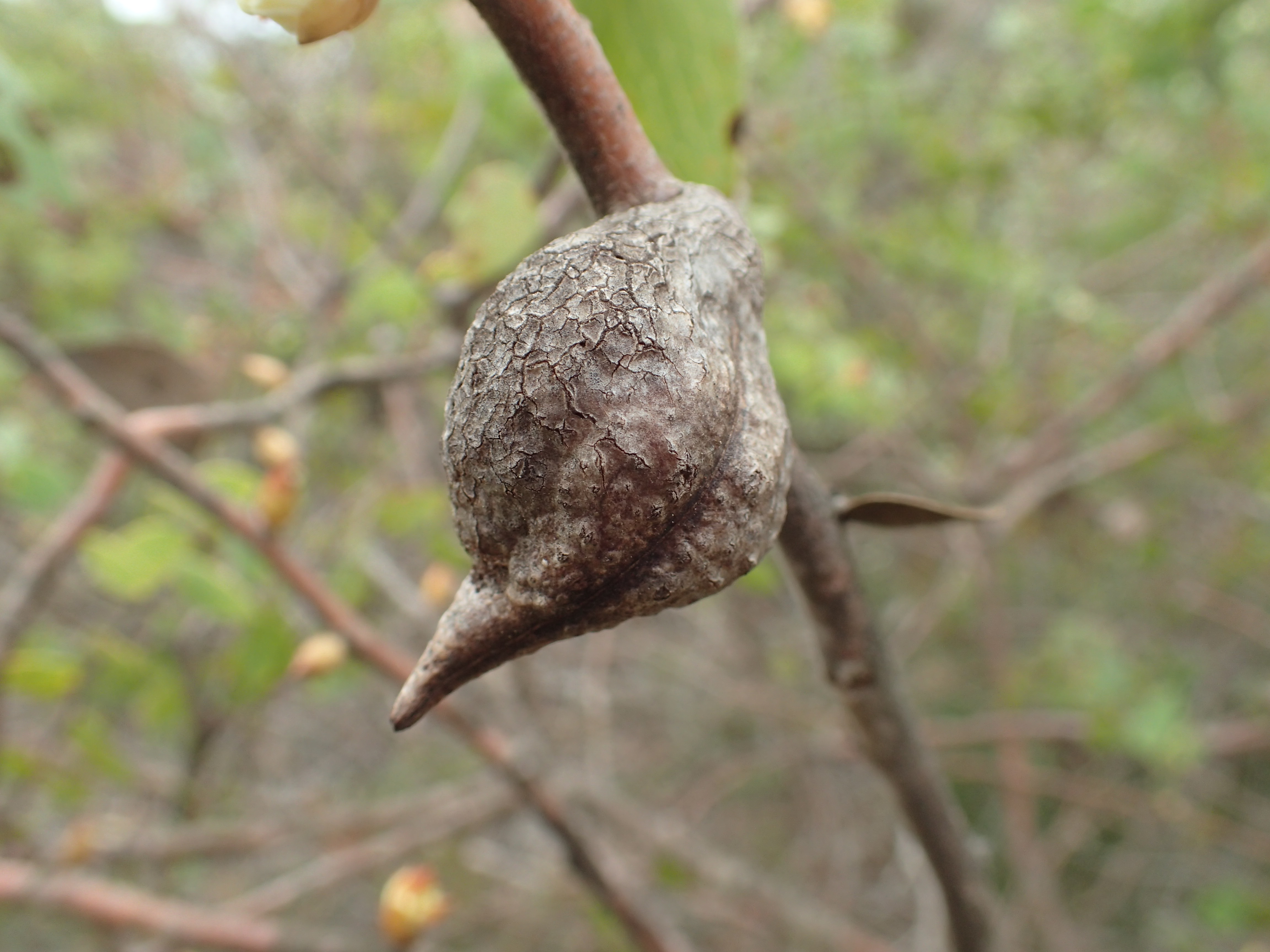
Fruit

== Description ==
Hakea ferruginea is an erect, rounded, non-lignotuberous shrub which typically grows to a height of 1 to 4.5 metres (3 to 15 ft). The branchlets are hairy and the leaves are arranged alternately. The pale green leaf blade is flat, narrowly to broadly egg-shaped or elliptic and is 1.5 to 8.5 centimetres (0.6 to 3.3 in) in length and 1.2 to 2.7 cm (0.47 to 1.06 in) wide. It blooms from July to November and produces white-cream flowers. The solitary inflorescences contain 16 to 20 flowers with a cream-white perianth. After flowering, obliquely ovate shaped beaked fruit appear. These are 2 to 3.1 cm (0.79 to 1.22 in) in length and 1.1 to 1.8 cm (0.43 to 0.71 in) wide. The black to brown seeds within have a narrowly ovate or elliptic shape with a wing down one edge.

== Taxonomy ==
Hakea ferruginea was first formally described by the botanist Robert Sweet in 1827 and the description was published in Flora Australasica. Hakea repanda R.Br. is a synonym. The specific epithet is a Latin word meaning "rust-coloured" or "rusty", referring to the colour of new growth.

== Distribution ==
Rusty hakea is found in a small area in the Wheatbelt and an area along the south coast of the Great Southern and Goldfields-Esperance regions of Western Australia where it grows in sandy, rocky loam or clay soils. The shrub is often part of mallee heath or open forest communities.

== Conservation status ==
Hakea ferruginea is classified as "not threatened" by the Western Australian Government Department of Parks and Wildlife.
