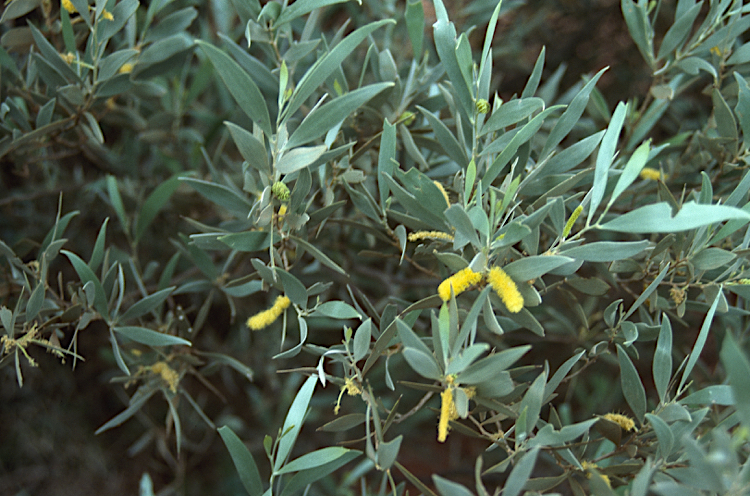
- Near Uluru

Scientific classification
- Kingdom: Plantae
- Clade: Tracheophytes
- Clade: Angiosperms
- Clade: Eudicots
- Clade: Rosids
- Order: Fabales
- Family: Fabaceae
- Subfamily: Caesalpinioideae
- Clade: Mimosoid clade
- Genus: Acacia
- Species: A. ayersiana

Binomial name
- Acacia ayersiana Maconochie

Synonyms
- List: Acacia aneura var. ayersiana (Maconochie) Pedley; Acacia aneura var. latifolia J.M.Black; Acacia ayersiana Maconochie var. ayersiana; Acacia ayersiana var. latifolia (J.M.Black) Randell; Racosperma ayersianum (Maconochie) Pedley

= Acacia ayersiana =

Species of plant

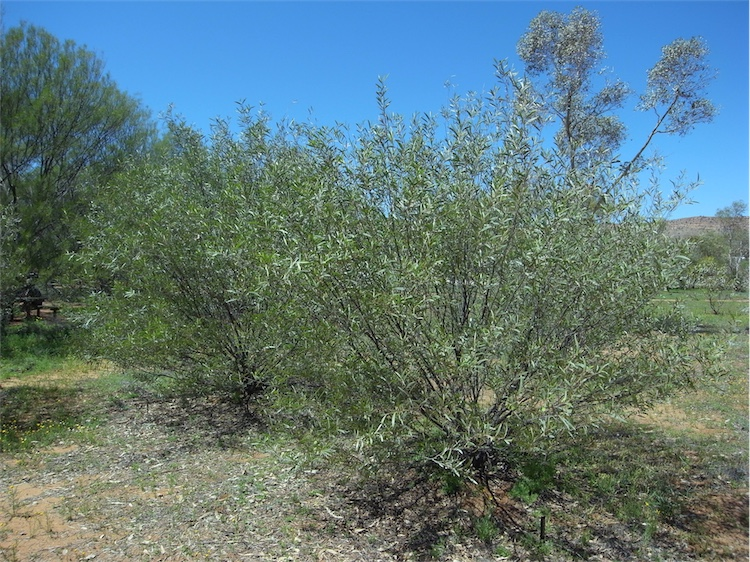
Habit in Alice Springs

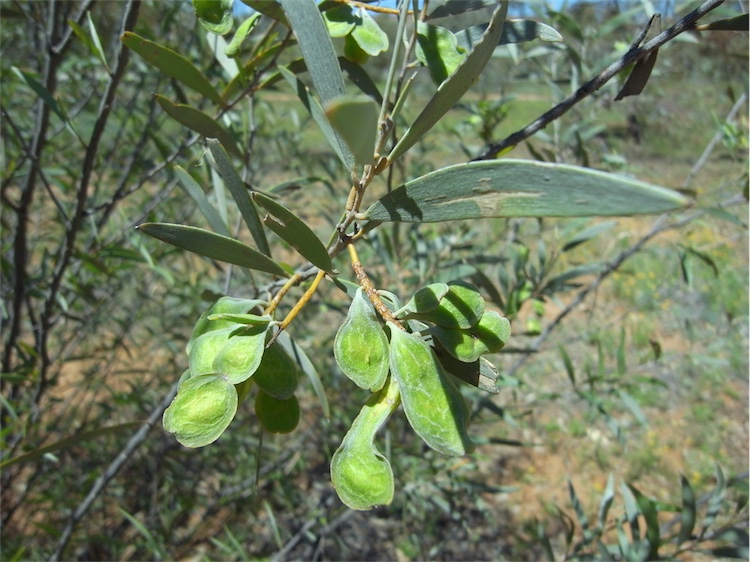
Pods

Acacia ayersiana, commonly known as Ayers Rock mulga, broad-leaf mulga, Uluru mulga, or blue mulga, is a species of flowering plant in the family Fabaceae and is endemic to arid areas of inland Australia. It is a rounded or conical shrub with the narrower end towards the base or a singe-stemmed tree, its phyllodes narrowly elliptic to lance-shaped, the flowers yellow and arranged in cylindrical spikes, and papery pods up to 40 mm (1.6 in) long on a short stalk.

== Description ==
Acacia ayersiana grows as a rounded or conical, many-stemmed shrub 3–6 m (9.8–19.7 ft) high and wide, sometimes as a single-stemmed tree 7–12 m (23–39 ft) high. Its branchlets are covered with soft hairs pressed against the surface between red-brown ribs. Its phyllodes are narrowly elliptic to lance-shaped, mostly 50–80 mm (2.0–3.1 in) long and 7–12 mm (0.28–0.47 in) wide. The flowers are borne in spikes 15–35 mm (0.59–1.38 in) long on a peduncle 3–6 mm (0.12–0.24 in) long. Flowering has been recorded in February and from April to June, and the pods are oblong on a short stalk, 10–40 mm (0.39–1.57 in) long and 10–14 mm (0.39–0.55 in) wide and papery. The seeds are oblong, 5–6 mm (0.20–0.24 in) long and 2.5–3.0 mm (0.098–0.118 in) wide with a small white aril.

== Taxonomy ==
Acacia ayersiana was first formally published in 1978 by John Maconochie, based on specimens he collected at Ayers Rock in 1973. The specific epithet (ayersiana) refers to Ayers Rock (Uluru) where the type specimen was collected.

== Distribution and habitat ==
Uluru mulga grows in low-lying areas and along creeks and swales and is widely distributed throughout arid and semi-arid parts of Australia, occurring in Western Australia, South Australia, and southern parts of the Northern Territory.

== See also ==
- List of Acacia species
