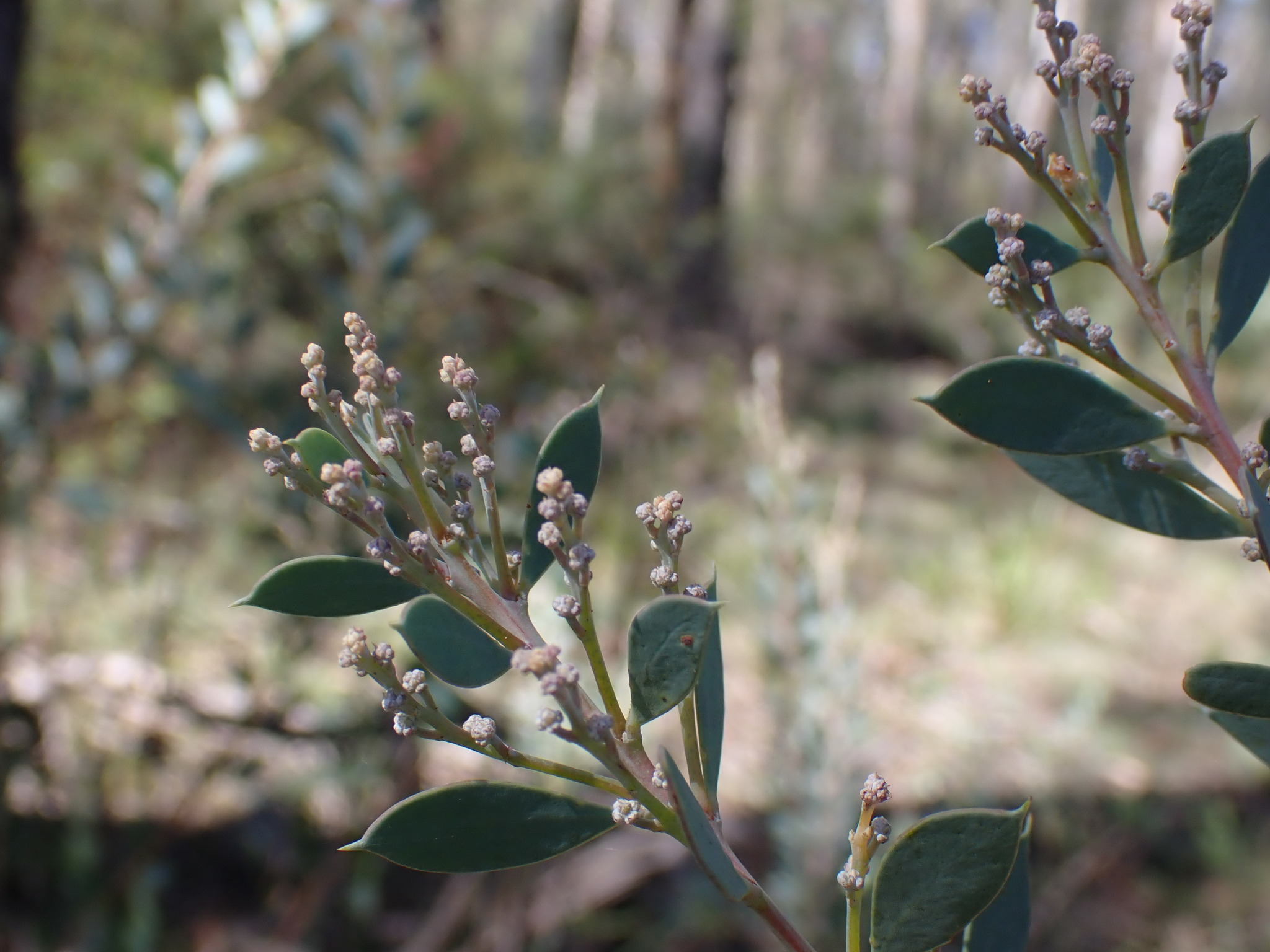

Scientific classification
- Kingdom: Plantae
- Clade: Tracheophytes
- Clade: Angiosperms
- Clade: Eudicots
- Clade: Rosids
- Order: Fabales
- Family: Fabaceae
- Subfamily: Caesalpinioideae
- Clade: Mimosoid clade
- Genus: Acacia
- Subgenus: Acacia subg. Phyllodineae
- Species: A. leucolobia

Binomial name
- Acacia leucolobia Sweet
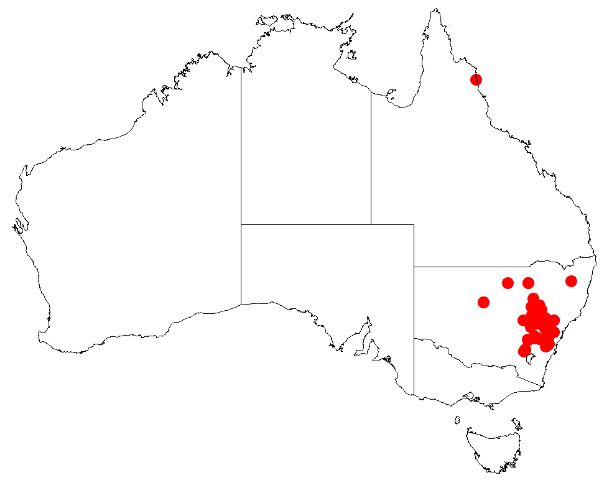
- Occurrence data from AVH

Synonyms
- Acacia dealbata A.Cunn. nom. illeg.; Acacia furfuracea G.Don nom. illeg., nom. superfl.; Racosperma leucolobium (Sweet) Pedley; Acacia oleifolia auct. non A.Cunn. ex G.Don: Bentham, G. in Hooker, W.J. (1842); Acacia oleifolia auct. non A.Cunn. ex G.Don: Bentham, G. (5 October 1864)

= Acacia leucolobia =

Species of legume

Acacia leucolobia is a species of flowering plant in the family Fabaceae and is endemic to New South Wales, Australia. It is an open, glabrous shrub with red to red-brown branchlets, egg-shaped to lance-shaped to narrowly elliptic phyllodes, spherical heads of bright golden yellow flowers, and firmly papery to thinly leathery, blackish pods.

== Description ==
Acacia leucolobia is an open, glabrous shrub that typically grows to a height of 1.5–3 m (4 ft 11 in – 9 ft 10 in) and has red to red-brown branchlets, sometimes covered with a white, powdery bloom. The phyllodes are egg-shaped to lance-shaped with the narrower end towards the base or elliptic to narrowly elliptic, 15–30 mm (0.59–1.18 in) long and 6–14 mm (0.24–0.55 in) wide with a small point on, or near the end. The phyllodes are leathery, glaucous to subglaucous with an obsure midrib and a gland 0.5–4 mm (0.020–0.157 in) aboe the pulvinus. The flowers are borne in five to nine spherical heads in racemes mostly 10–50 mm (0.39–1.97 in) long, on peduncles 3–6 mm (0.12–0.24 in) long. The heads are 8–10 mm (0.31–0.39 in) in diameter with 5 to 10 loosely arranged bright golden yellow flowers. Flowering occurs from August to October and the pods are straight to slightly curved, up to 80 mm (3.1 in) long, 6–8 mm (0.24–0.31 in) wide, firnly papery to thinly leathery and blackish. The seeds are oblong to egg-shaped, about 5 mm (0.20 in) long and black with a club-shaped aril.

== Taxonomy ==
In 1825, Allan Cunningham described Acacia dealbata in On the Botany of the Blue Mountains in Barron Field's Geographical Memoirs on New South Wales, but that name was illegitimate, because it was given to a different species by Link in 1822. In 1830, Robert Sweet changed the name to Acacia leucolobia in his Hortus Britannicus.

== Distribution and habitat ==
Acacia leucolobia is native to an area from around Coolah to around Katoomba, and from around Bowral to Wingello where it grows in open Eucalyptus woodland .

== See also ==
- List of Acacia species
