= Barbara Rae Randell =

Australian botanist (born 1942)

- Born: Barbara Rae Redgen; 1942 (age 83–84)
- Occupation: Botanist

Barbara Rae Randell (born:Barbara Rae Redgen 1942) is an Australian botanist.

== Early life ==
During the 1960s, Randell lived on her family's farm in Redford in the western Darling Downs in Queensland, Australia.

== Botanical career ==
The author's international identifier on the International Plant Names Index is 25305–1.

Randell described plants in the genera Senna and Acacia.

== Bibliography ==
- Redgen, B.R. (1965). A Taxonomic Study of Eriachne R. Br. (Gramineae).
- Randell, Barbara Rae (1969). Biosystematic Studies in Australian Zone Cassia Species. Flinders University.
- Lethbridge, Ben; Randell, Barbara Rae (2003). Genetic and Agronomic Improvement of Quandong - A Report for the Rural Industries Research and Development Corporation. Rural Industries Research and Development Corporation.
- Randell, B. R.; Barlow, B. A. (1998). George, A. S. (ed.). "Senna". Flora of Australia. 12. Canberra, Australia: Australian Government Publishing Service: 89–138.
