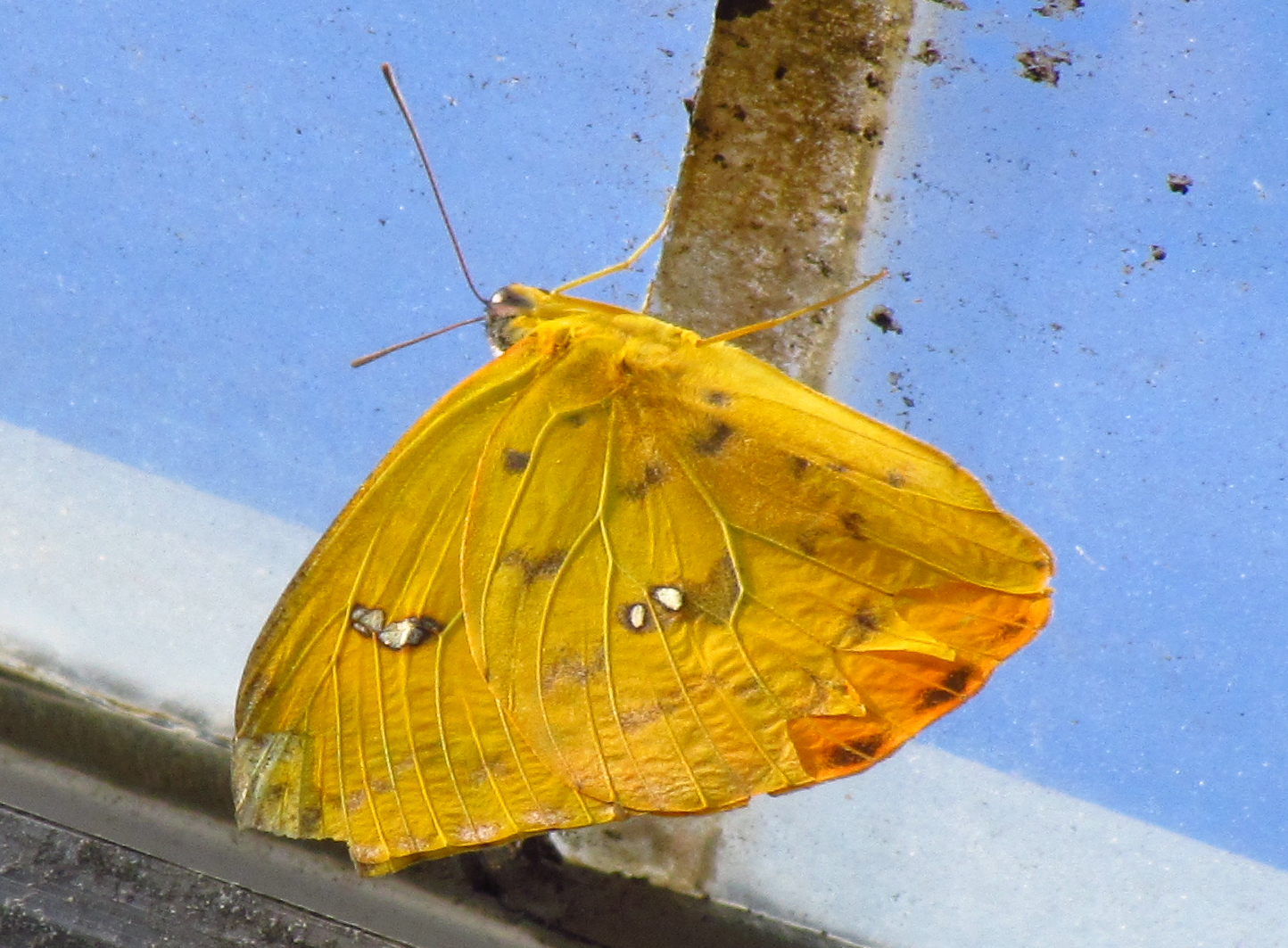
- Ventral view

Scientific classification
- Kingdom: Animalia
- Phylum: Arthropoda
- Clade: Pancrustacea
- Class: Insecta
- Order: Lepidoptera
- Family: Pieridae
- Genus: Catopsilia
- Species: C. scylla

Binomial name
- Catopsilia scylla (Linnaeus, 1763)

= Catopsilia scylla =

Species of butterfly

Catopsilia scylla, the orange migrant or orange emigrant, is a species of butterfly that lives in South East Asia and Australasia. Its larvae feed predominantly on plants of the genera Cassia and Senna.

== Description ==
Adults are approximately 60–65 millimetres (2.4–2.6 in) long. The males have white forewings edged in black, and cadmium-yellow hindwings, usually with black spots on the margins. Females are similar, but have an additional group of black spots on the forewing, which often merge to form a dark ring.

== Distribution ==
Catopsilia scylla has a wide distribution in South East Asia and Australasia. Its range stretches from Myanmar, Cambodia, Philippines, Thailand, and Vietnam, along the Malay Peninsula, across Java and Sumatra, and over northern Australia. It was recently discovered in Sri Lanka.

== Host plants ==
In Australia, C. scylla has been recorded on various species of Senna, including S. didymobotrya, S. leptoclada and S. surattensis. In Singapore, host plants include Senna obtusifolia, Cassia fistula, and especially Senna pallida.

The eggs are milky white and spindle shaped, and are usually laid singly on a leaf of the host plant. The eggs hatch after 1.5–2 days, and the caterpillars grow through five instars over 11–13 days, to reach a final length of 40 millimetres (1.6 in). The caterpillars are green and smooth, with a rounded head, and develops a series of black dots and a white lateral line on top of the plain green ground colour. Pupae are 26 mm (1.0 in) long, and are attached to the host plant in an upright position. After seven days, the adult emerges.

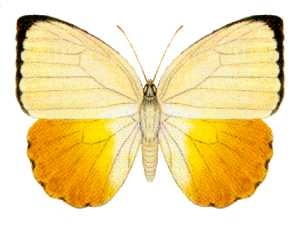
Dorsal view, male C. s. etesia (orange migrant)

== Taxonomy ==
Catopsilia scylla was first described by Carl Linnaeus, as Papilio scylla, in his 1763 work Centuria Insectorum.

The subspecies C. s. etesia (originally described as Catopsilia etesia) is known in Australia as the orange migrant. Elsewhere, the species is called the orange emigrant. Other subspecies include C. s. praerubida, C. s. sidra, C. s. cornelia, C. s. asema, C. s. bangkeiana and C. s. moluccarum.
