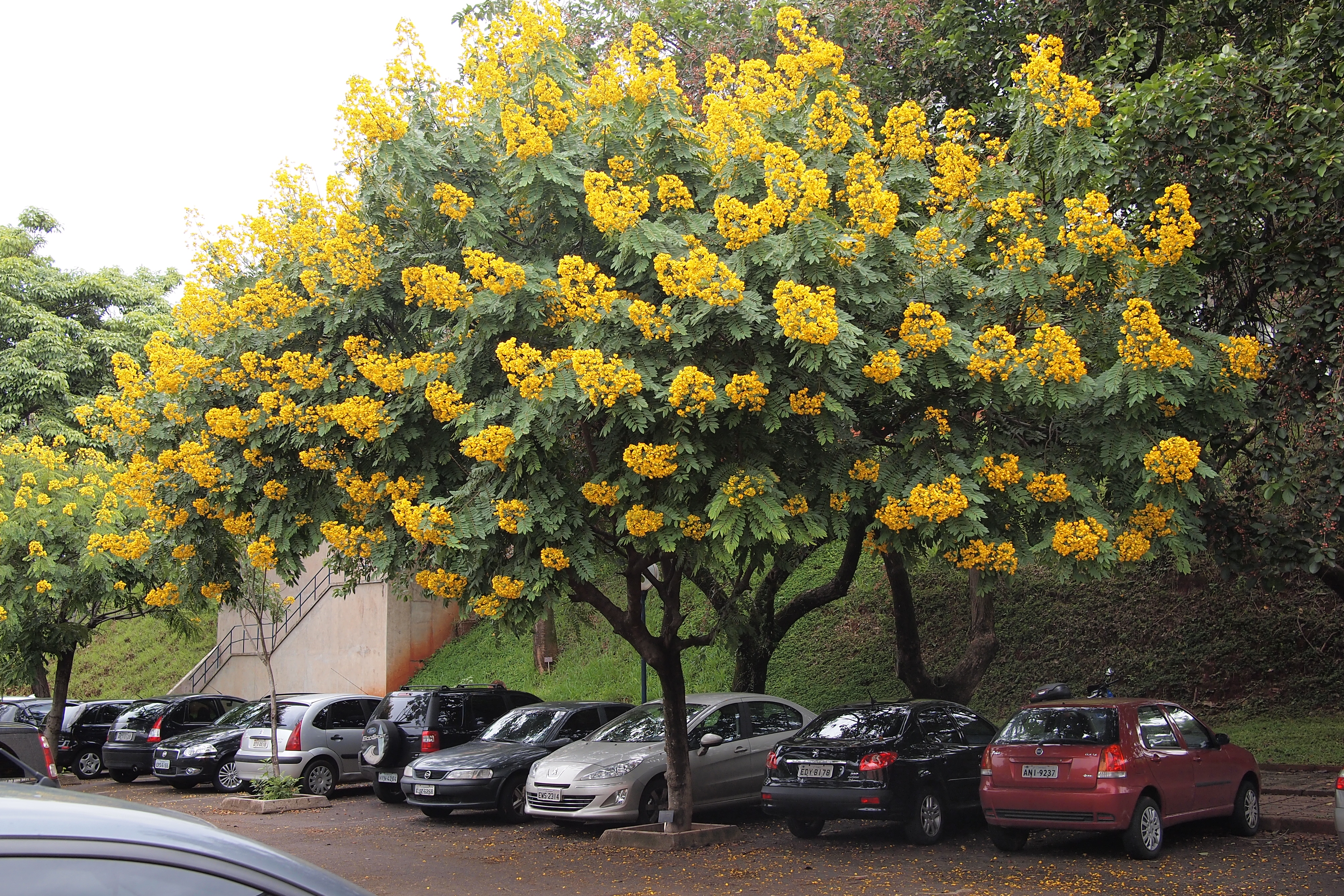

Scientific classification
- Kingdom: Plantae
- Clade: Tracheophytes
- Clade: Angiosperms
- Clade: Eudicots
- Clade: Rosids
- Order: Fabales
- Family: Fabaceae
- Subfamily: Caesalpinioideae
- Genus: Senna
- Species: S. spectabilis

Binomial name
- Senna spectabilis (DC.) Irwin & Barneby

Synonyms
- Numerous, see text

= Senna spectabilis =

Species of legume

Senna spectabilis is a plant species of the legume family (Fabaceae) in the subfamily Caesalpinioideae native to South and Central America. They are often grown as an ornamental in front yards, parks, gardens, buildings etc. due to their bright yellow flowers that bloom during the summer months. They are also known as golden wonder tree, American cassia, popcorn tree, Cassia excelsa, golden shower tree or Archibald's cassia.

The plant has become an invasive alien species in parts of Africa such as Kenya, Malawi, Tanzania and Uganda, and also in South-India, after it was introduced for resources such as firewood as well as to help combat deteriorating ecosystems affected by deforestation and desertification. Currently, S. spectabilis is overtaking native tree species of forestry ecosystems around the world because of its ability to grow quickly.

== Description ==
Senna spectabilis

Senna spectabilis is a shrub or deciduous tree that can grow anywhere from 15 to 20 ft in height and 15–20 ft in width. S. spectabilis have a rounded vase-shaped crown, which is dense and symmetrical. S. spectabilis is pollinated by bees and has a very fast growth rate.

=== Foliage ===
A rounded, evergreen foliage, arranged alternatively. The leaf type is odd-pinnately compound with pinnate leaf venation and 4–15 pairs of leaflets each growing to as large as 7.5 cm. The leaves are green and yellow in color and remains as so year around. The leaf blades grow between 2–4 inches long and experience a circadian rhythm or nyctinasty, closing at night and opening at dawn.

=== Flower and fruit ===
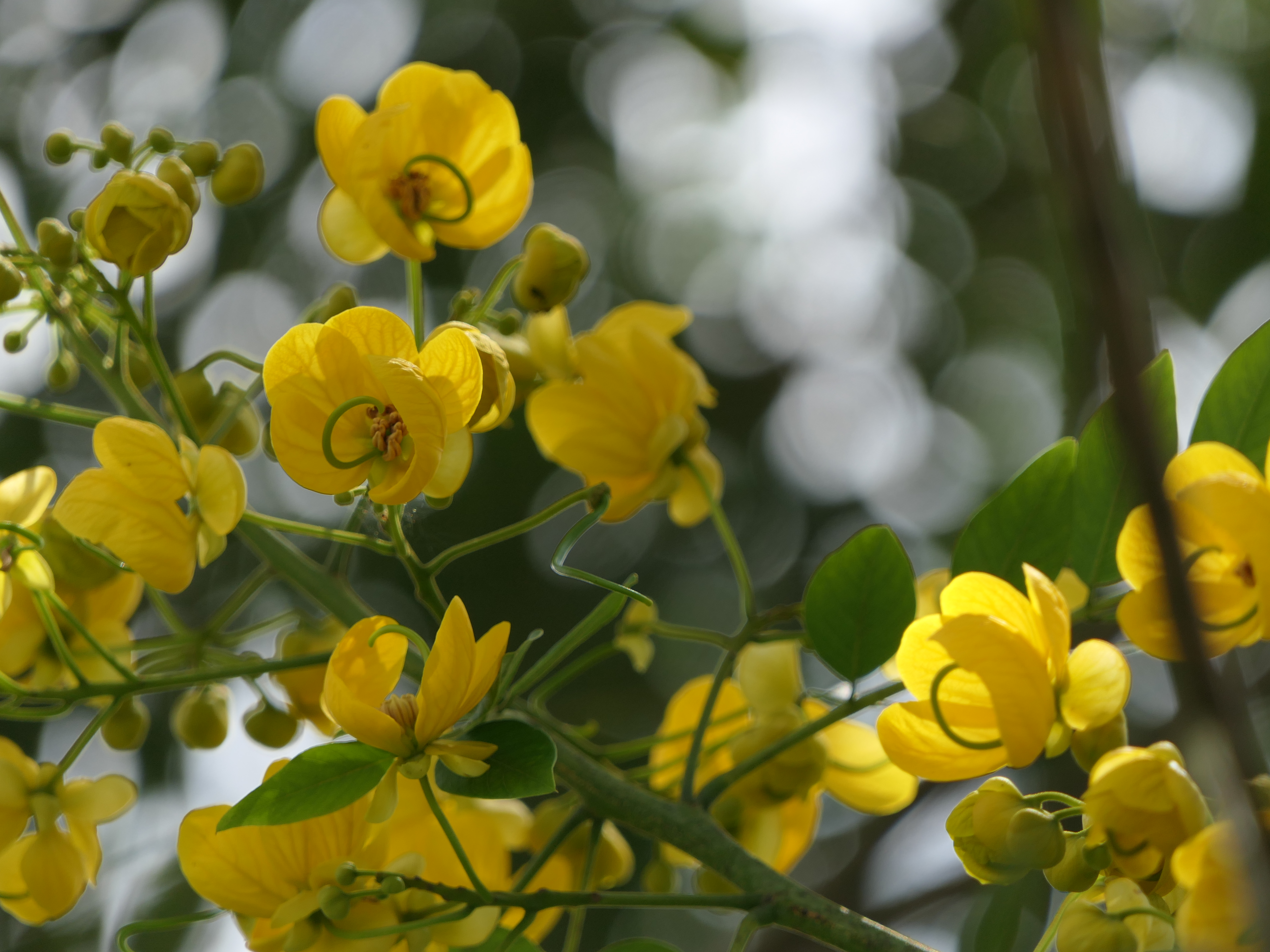
Flowers of Senna spectabilis

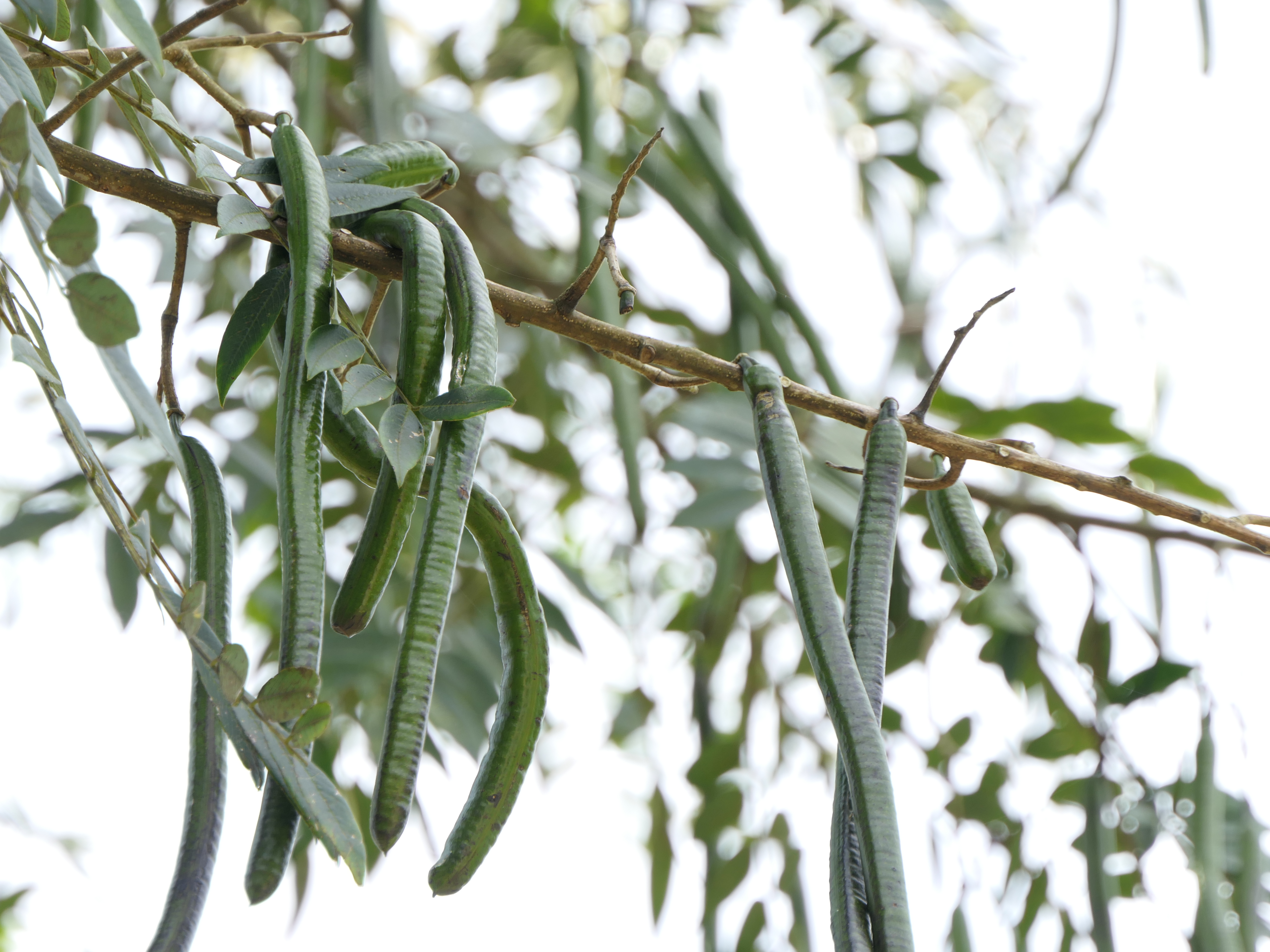
Senna spectabilis fruit pod

Bright yellow inflorescence 10–50 cm long containing a corolla 3.5–4 cm in diameter with five unequal petals. The flowers are very showy producing elongated pod shaped fruits about 6–12 inches in length. The fruit is a dry dehiscent, black/brownish in color containing numerous flat brown seeds, 0.5 cm in diameter.

=== Trunk and branches ===
Multiple trunks with diameters of up to about 30 cm. The branches are droopy with smooth grey bark having horizontal markings. As the plant matures it develops many warts and broad vertical bands of lenticels. In the first year of development the stem is finely hairy.

== Distribution ==
Senna spectabilis is native from South America first found in eastern tropical Brazil and coastal Ecuador, eventually migrating throughout Central America as well as the West Indies in forests from up to 2000 m of altitude. ' Their habitats include rain forest, semi-deciduous and dry forest, montane forest, and dry valleys. The plant requires full sunlight and well-drained soil to grow. S. spectabilis can flourish in a variety of different soils from moist, clay, sand, loam, slightly alkaline, and acidic soils even in poor black cotton soils. However it has difficulties adapting to soils with high aerosol salt concentrations. There are no known diseases that affects the plant. Today the species can be found in tropical areas all around the world due to its invasive nature.

== Taxonomy and systematics ==
Senna spectabilis was long placed in the genus Cassia, or in the non-monophyletic Cathartocarpus assemblage, or separated – together with its relative Senna peralteana – in Pseudocassia. In addition, it has been variously treated under a range of taxa, some of which were also used for related plants:

- Cassia amazonica Ducke
- Cassia carnaval Speg.
- Cassia edulis Posada-Ar.
- Cassia excelsa Schrad. var. acutifolia Hassl.

Cassia excelsa Kunth is a synonym of Cassia fistula. See also below.
Cassia acutifolia Delile and Senna acutifolia (Delile) Batka are synonyms of Senna alexandrina Mill.

- Cassia humboldtiana DC.
- Cassia speciosa Kunth

Senna speciosa Roxb. is a synonym of Senna surattensis (Burm. f.) H.S.Irwin & Barneby. See also below.

- Cassia spectabilis DC.
- Cassia totonaca Sessé & Moc.
- Cassia trinitatis DC.
- Cathartocarpus humboldtianus Loudon
- Cathartocarpus speciosus (DC.) G.Don
- Cathartocarpus trinitatis (DC.) G.Don
- Pseudocassia spectabilis (DC.) Britton & Rose

In addition, one or two varieties of this species are recognized:

- var. excelsa (Schrad.) H.S.Irwin & Barneby with the synonyms:
  - Cassia excelsa Schrad. (see also above)
  - Cassia fastigiata Nees (Cassia fastigiata Vahl is a synonym of Senna surattensis (Burm. f.) H.S.Irwin & Barneby)
- var. micans (Nees) H.S.Irwin & Barneby – may belong into Senna macranthera (Collad.) H.S.Irwin & Barneby (= Cassia macranthera Collad.). Synonyms:
  - Cassia micans Nees
  - Cassia speciosa Schrad. (see also above)
  - Chamaefistula speciosa G.Don

The taxonomic tree of Senna spectabillis:

== Uses ==
Senna spectabilis has a few medicinal properties. The plant can be used as a treatment for ringworm and skin diseases. After extracting a leaf on alcohol there was significant antifungal activity, which suggests it can be used with infections caused by Candida albicans. The plant is effective against food borne pathogen B. Senna spectabilis also produces several substances that we deem necessary for metabolism, in which they are also used as a medicine or pharmaceutical drug. Pharmaceuticals that can produce piperidine alkaloids, pentacyclic terpenoids, and anthraquinones. It is also used in both eastern and western traditional medicine treating several different diseases and symptoms.

Senna spectabilis is also used as a medicinal plant in Cameroon by traditional healers to treat epilepsy, constipation, insomnia, and anxiety. In a recent study, the anticonvulsant effects of S. spectabilis was observed on mice undergoing seizures induced by maximal electroshock (MES), pentylenetetrazole (PTZ) and pilocarpine (PC). It was discovered that the mice undergoing PTZ induced seizures were protected 100% of the time when administered the lowest plant dose. In another experiment on differing doses, the plant offered protection up to 75% of the time on antagonized seizures induced by PC. The study concluded that Senna spectabilis contains anticonvulsant activity, most likely acting on the GABA complex receptor.

Other non medical related uses, S. spectabilis is used in agroforestry as a shade tree. The species is useful for fodder, mulch, firewood and as a source of honey. The heartwood is brown and the sapwood is white-ish. The wood is heavy, soft, and hard, when kept dry can be resistant to termites. For this reason S. spectabilis is often used for economic reasons. The wood is used for tool handles, boxes, furniture, lumber and other construction materials. The wood is also used as fuel wood and to make charcoal.

S. spectabilis was introduced to Africa as an ornamental and a boundary marker. It is not highly valued but it produces good quality firewood. Senna spectabilis can invade disturbed forests, forest edges, and gaps where it can establish and suppress the regeneration of native species. Recently, Tamil Nadu started making paper for the press for better utilization of this invasive tree spreading in Mudumalai Tiger Reserve.

== Gallery ==
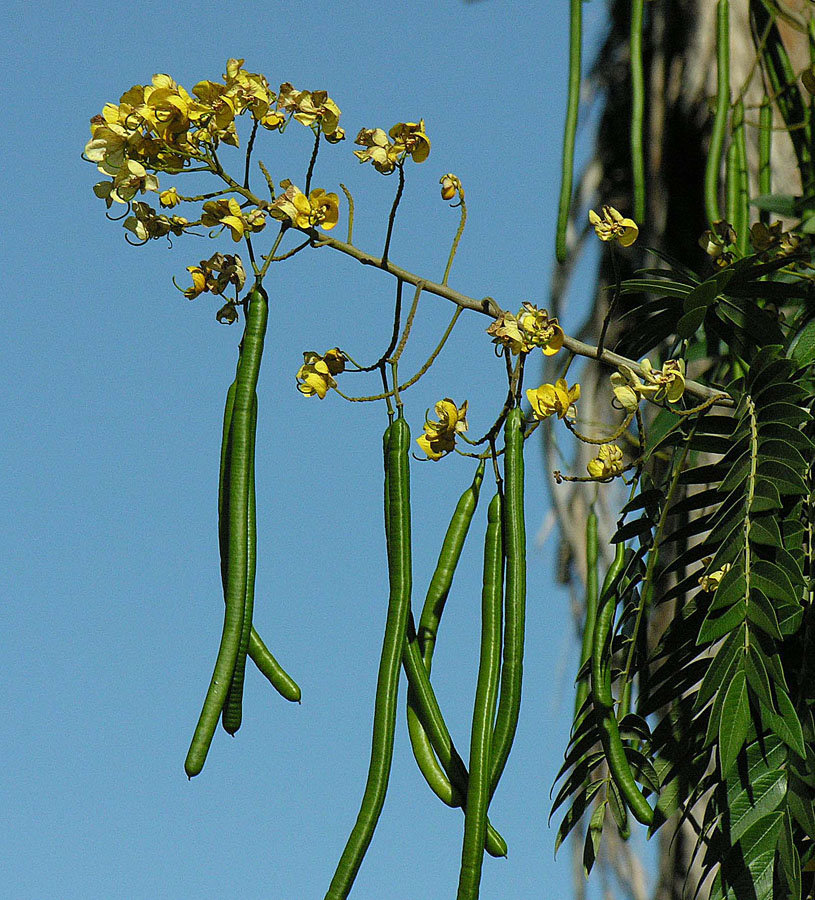
Fruits

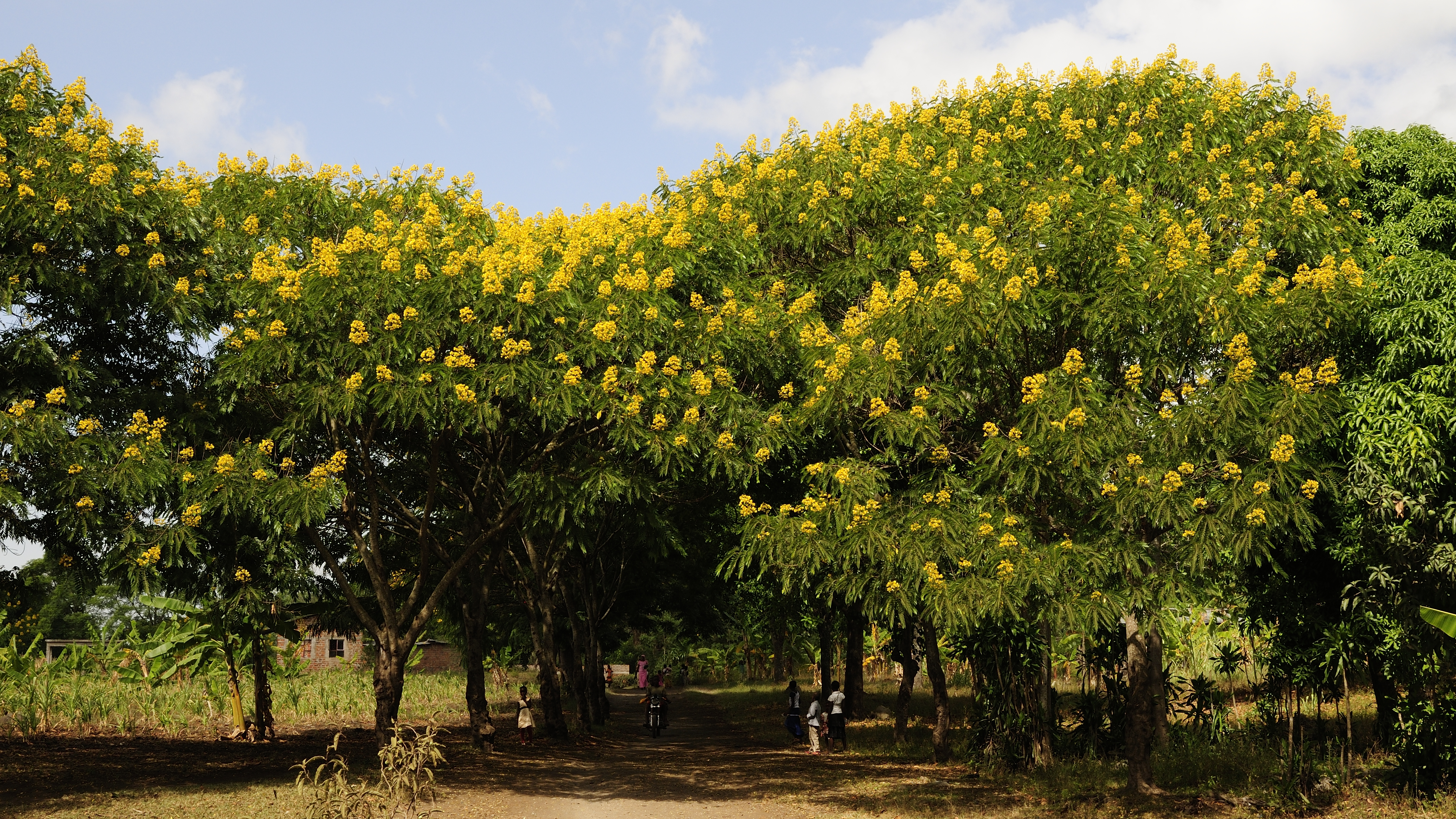
Flowering trees

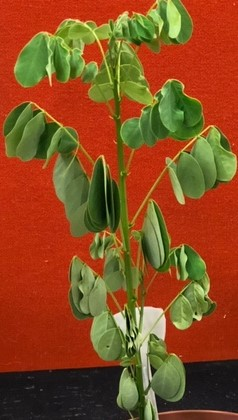
Seedling
