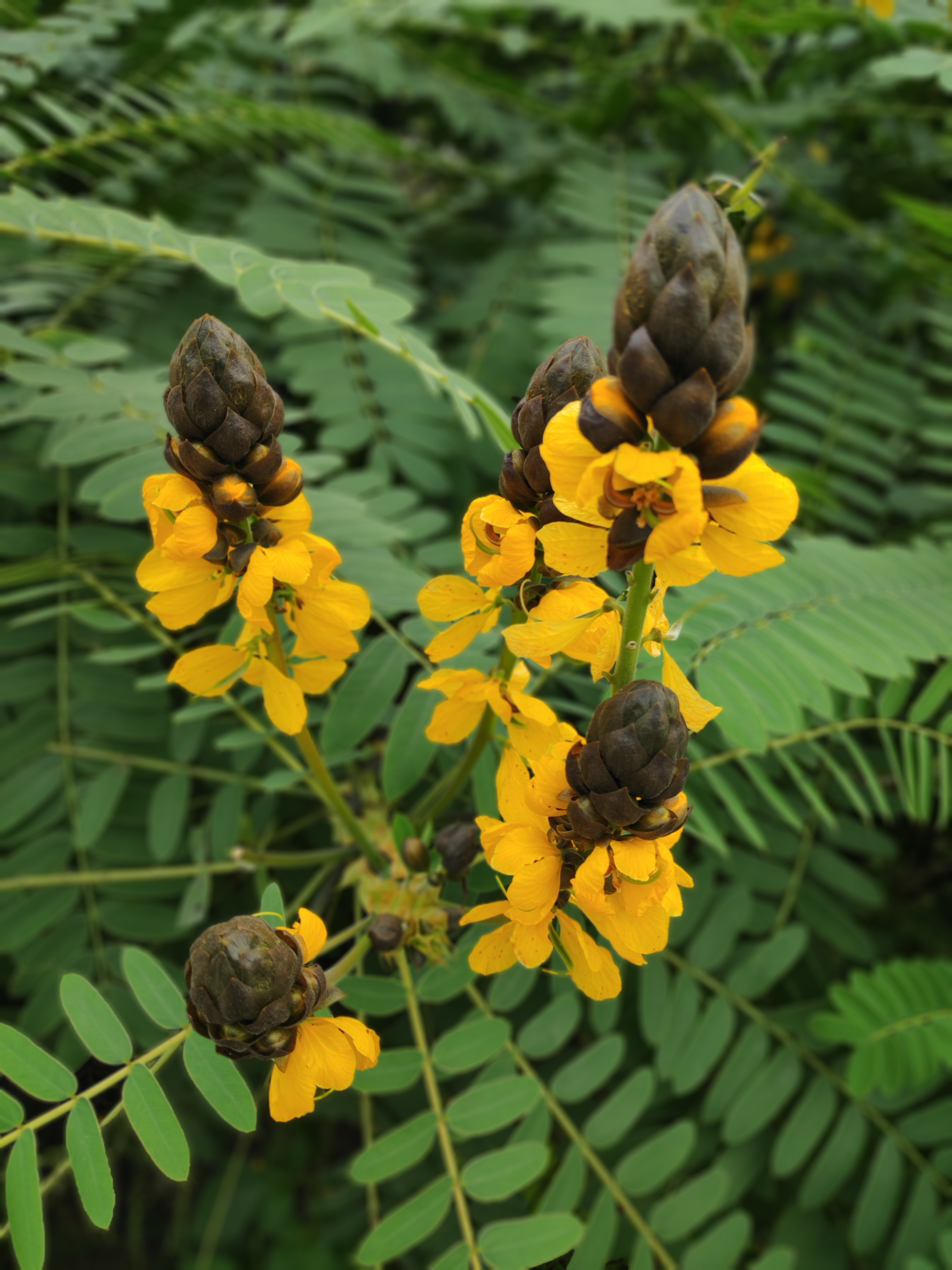

Scientific classification
- Kingdom: Plantae
- Clade: Embryophytes
- Clade: Tracheophytes
- Clade: Spermatophytes
- Clade: Angiosperms
- Clade: Eudicots
- Clade: Rosids
- Order: Fabales
- Family: Fabaceae
- Subfamily: Caesalpinioideae
- Genus: Senna
- Species: S. didymobotrya

Binomial name
- Senna didymobotrya (Fresen.) Irwin & Barneby

Synonyms
- Cassia didymobotrya

= Senna didymobotrya =

Species of legume

Senna didymobotrya is a species of flowering plant in the legume family known by the common names African senna, popcorn senna, candelabra tree, and peanut butter cassia. It is native to Africa, where it can be found across the continent in several types of habitats.

It has been introduced to many other parts of the world for use as an ornamental plant, a cover crop, and a leguminous green manure. In some places it is now naturalized in the wild, for example, in parts of Indonesia, Australia, Mexico, and the United States in California, Florida, and Hawaii.

== Description ==
African senna is a hairy, aromatic shrub usually growing up to about five meters tall but known to reach nine meters in optimal growing conditions. The leaves of the plant are up to half a meter long and are made up of many pairs of elongated oval leaflets each up to 6.5 centimeters long.

The African senna plant has a strong, distinct scent that has been variously described as being reminiscent of mice, wet dog, peanut butter, and burnt popcorn.

The plant flowers plentifully in racemes of bright yellow flowers, with some flowers also occurring in leaf axils. The flower raceme has open flowers on the lower part with unopened buds at the tip covered in stark brownish green or black bracts. The flower has five concave petals each 1.5 to nearly 3 centimeters long. The flower has ten stamens, usually seven fertile ones and three sterile staminodes. Some of the stamens have large anthers measuring a centimeter long.

The fruits of the African senna plant are flat brown legume pods up to 12 centimeters long, each containing as many as 16 bean-like seeds that are themselves up to a centimeter long each.

The plant is poisonous.

== Taxonomy and phylogenetics ==
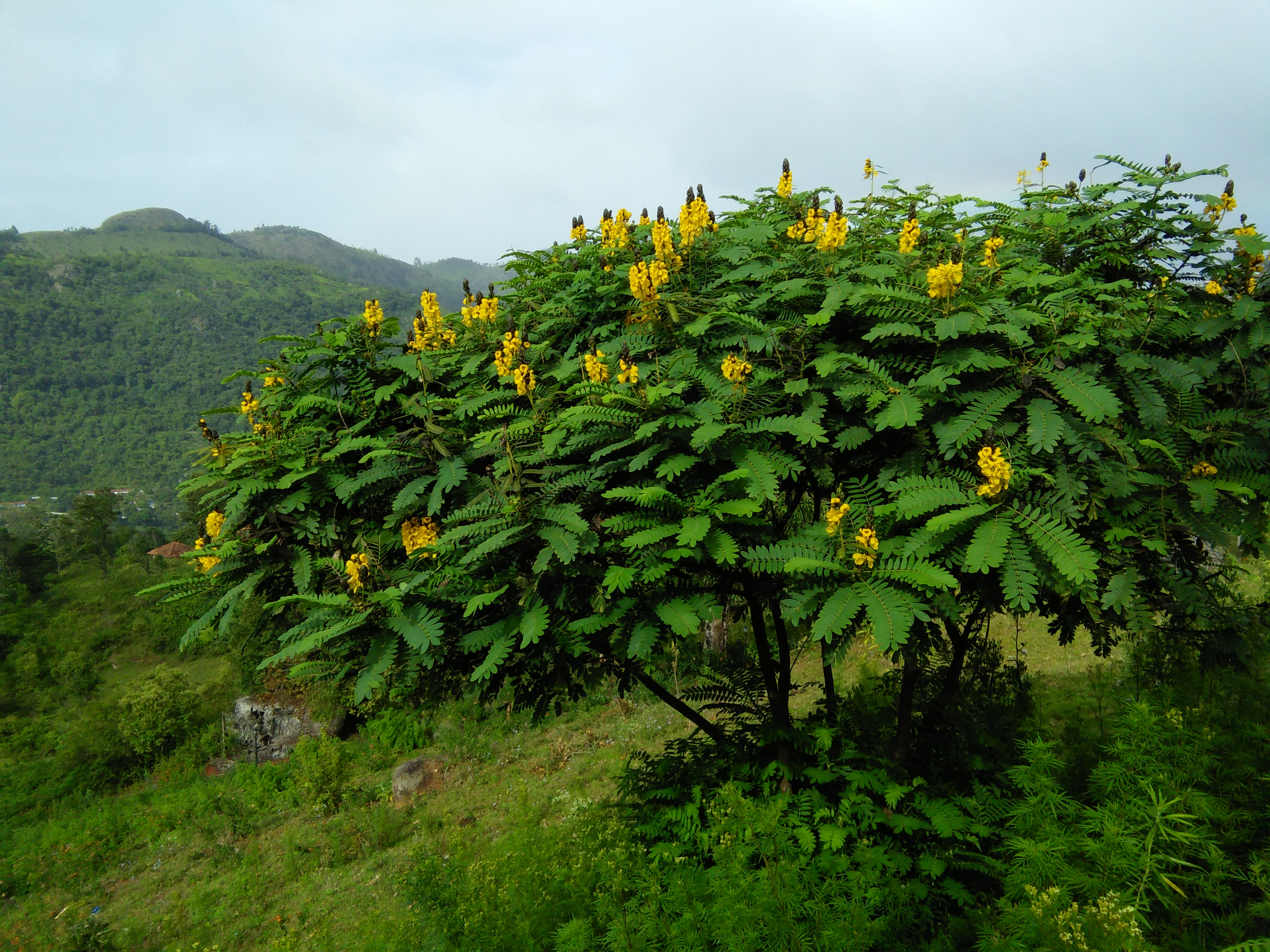
A small tree in Tamil Nadu, India

The African senna plant is one of 249 species in the genus Senna of the legume family. According to Open Tree of Life, it's closest relative is Senna italica which is also native to Africa as well as parts of India.

- - - - S. martiana
      - S. reticulata
    - S. notabilis
    - - S. didymobotrya
      - S. italica
  - S. paradictyon
  - - S. magnifolia
    - S. pleurocarpa
- S. nicaraguensis
- S. alata
- S. venusta

== Uses ==
In Kenya, some cultures, particularly Kalenjins, use the plant to prepare a special type of sour milk (mursik) which is used mainly during festivities. A sizeable tree is cut and its branches pruned. The bark is mostly removed, then dried. Once the bark is dry, and the specially made calabash gourd, or Sotet, has been cleaned and dried, the senna bark is put in a fire, and removed when charred. The process emits fragrant smoke. The charred bark is used to coat the inside of the gourd, which is subsequently used for the storage of fermented or fresh milk.
