= Zabrotes chavesi =

Scientific classification
- Kingdom: Animalia
- Phylum: Arthropoda
- Class: Insecta
- Order: Coleoptera
- Suborder: Polyphaga
- Infraorder: Cucujiformia
- Family: Chrysomelidae
- Genus: Zabrotes
- Species: Z. chavesi

Binomial name
- Zabrotes chavesi Kingsolver, 1980

Species of beetle

Zabrotes chavesi is a species of leaf beetle in the family Chrysomelidae. It is found in the Americas, from northern South America (Venezuela) through Central America to Mexico and Arizona (USA). It is named for Franklin Chaves, the director of Santa Rosa National Park (Costa Rica), which is the type locality of this species.

The holotype was collected from Cassia leptocarpa (=Senna hirsuta) seeds. Other food plants include Cassia emarginata (=Senna bicapsularis) and Senna spectabilis.

Zabrotes chavesi measure 1.6–2.8 mm (0.063–0.110 in) in length and are dorsally brown with some grey markings.
