= Zabrotes spectabilis =

Scientific classification
- Kingdom: Animalia
- Phylum: Arthropoda
- Class: Insecta
- Order: Coleoptera
- Suborder: Polyphaga
- Infraorder: Cucujiformia
- Family: Chrysomelidae
- Genus: Zabrotes
- Species: Z. spectabilis

Binomial name
- Zabrotes spectabilis Horn, 1885

Species of beetle

Zabrotes spectabilis is a species of leaf beetle in the family Chrysomelidae. It is found in North America in the western United States and Mexico.

Zabrotes spectabilis measure 0.7–1.7 mm (0.028–0.067 in) in length and are black in color. They feed on various species of Senna (Fabaceae).
