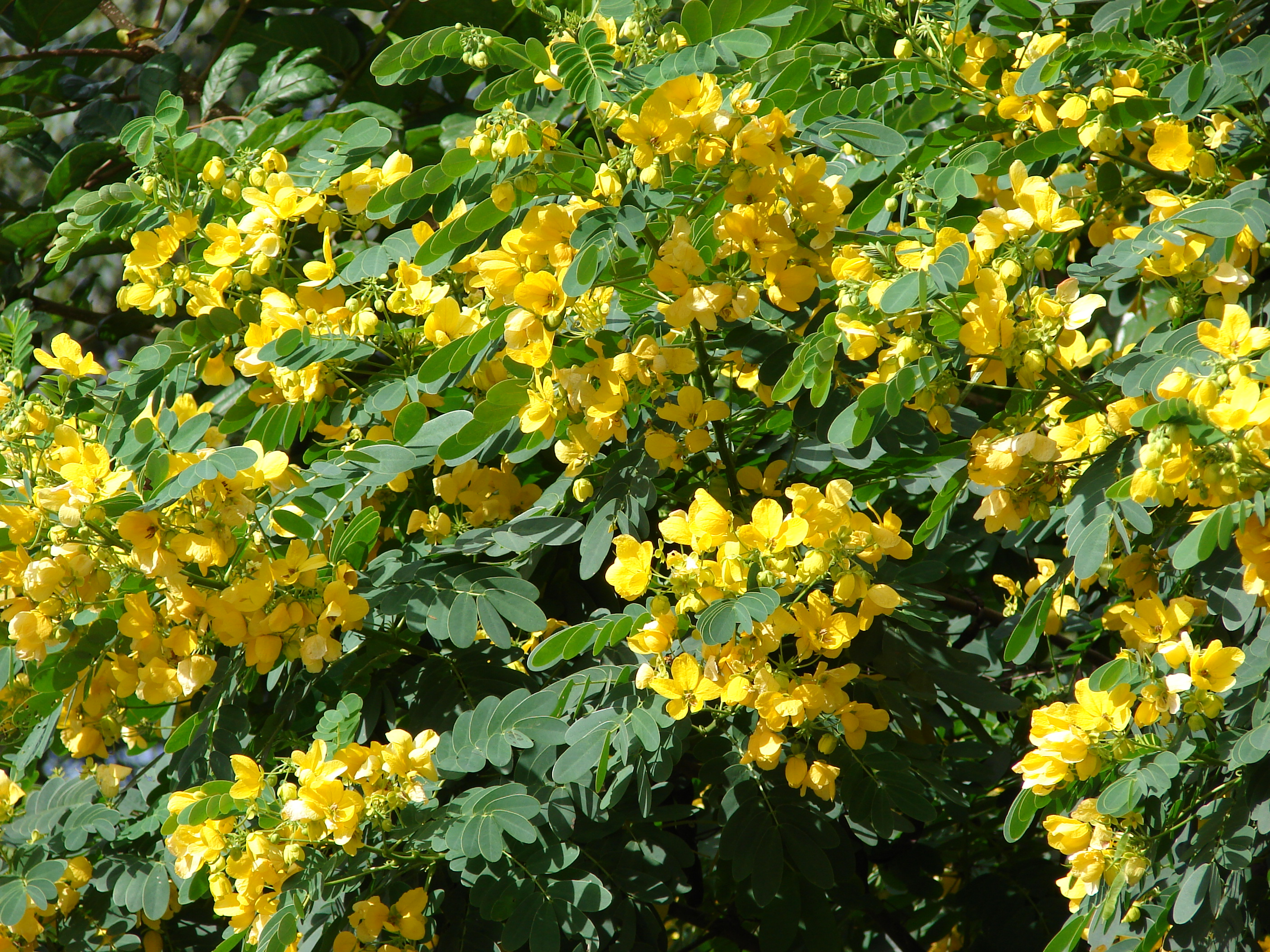

Conservation status
- Least Concern (IUCN 3.1)

Scientific classification
- Kingdom: Plantae
- Clade: Embryophytes
- Clade: Tracheophytes
- Clade: Angiosperms
- Clade: Eudicots
- Clade: Rosids
- Order: Fabales
- Family: Fabaceae
- Subfamily: Caesalpinioideae
- Genus: Senna
- Species: S. surattensis

Binomial name
- Senna surattensis (Burm.f.) H.S.Irwin & Barneby

Synonyms
- Cassia fastigiata Vahl; Cassia glauca var. koenigii Kurz; Cassia glauca var. suffruticosa (J.Koenig ex Roth) Baker, J.D.Hooker; Cassia spinigera var. suffruticosa (J.Koenig ex Roth) Ali; Cassia suffruticosa J.Koenig ex Roth; Cassia surattensis subsp. suffruticosa (J.Koenig ex Roth) K.Larsen & S.S.Larsen; Cassia surattensis var. suffruticosa (J.Koenig ex Roth) Chatterjee; Psilorhegma suffruticosa (J.Koenig ex Roth) Britton

= Senna surattensis =

Species of leguminous plant

Senna surattensis, also called glossy shower, scrambled egg tree, glossy shower, golden Senna, glaucous Cassia, sunshine tree and bushy Cassia, is a plant species of the legume family (Fabaceae) in the subfamily Caesalpinioideae that is native to southeast Asia, and possibly northern and eastern Australia.

S. surattensis is named after Surat district, situated near Bombay, India.

== Description ==
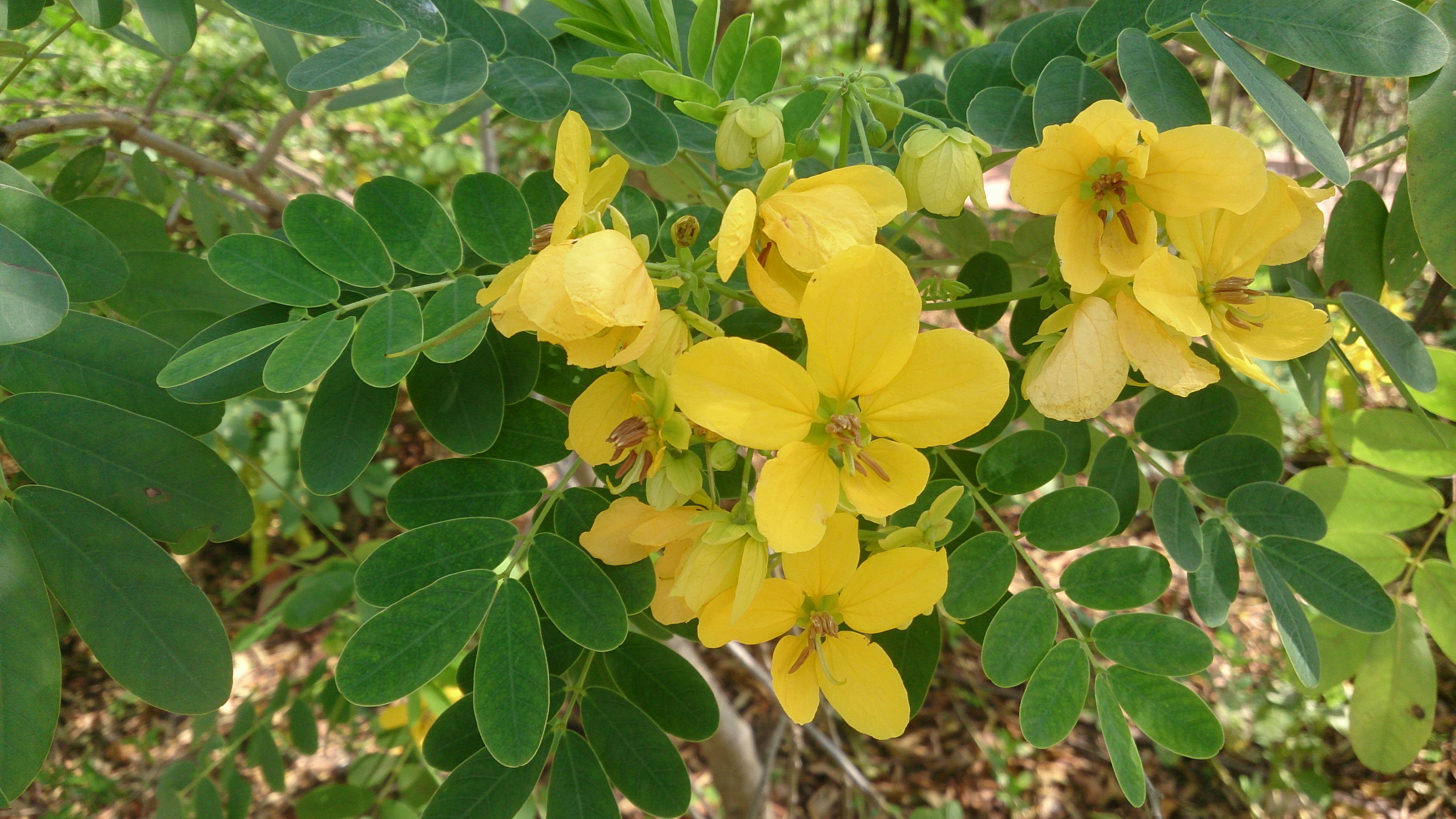
Flower of Senna surattensis

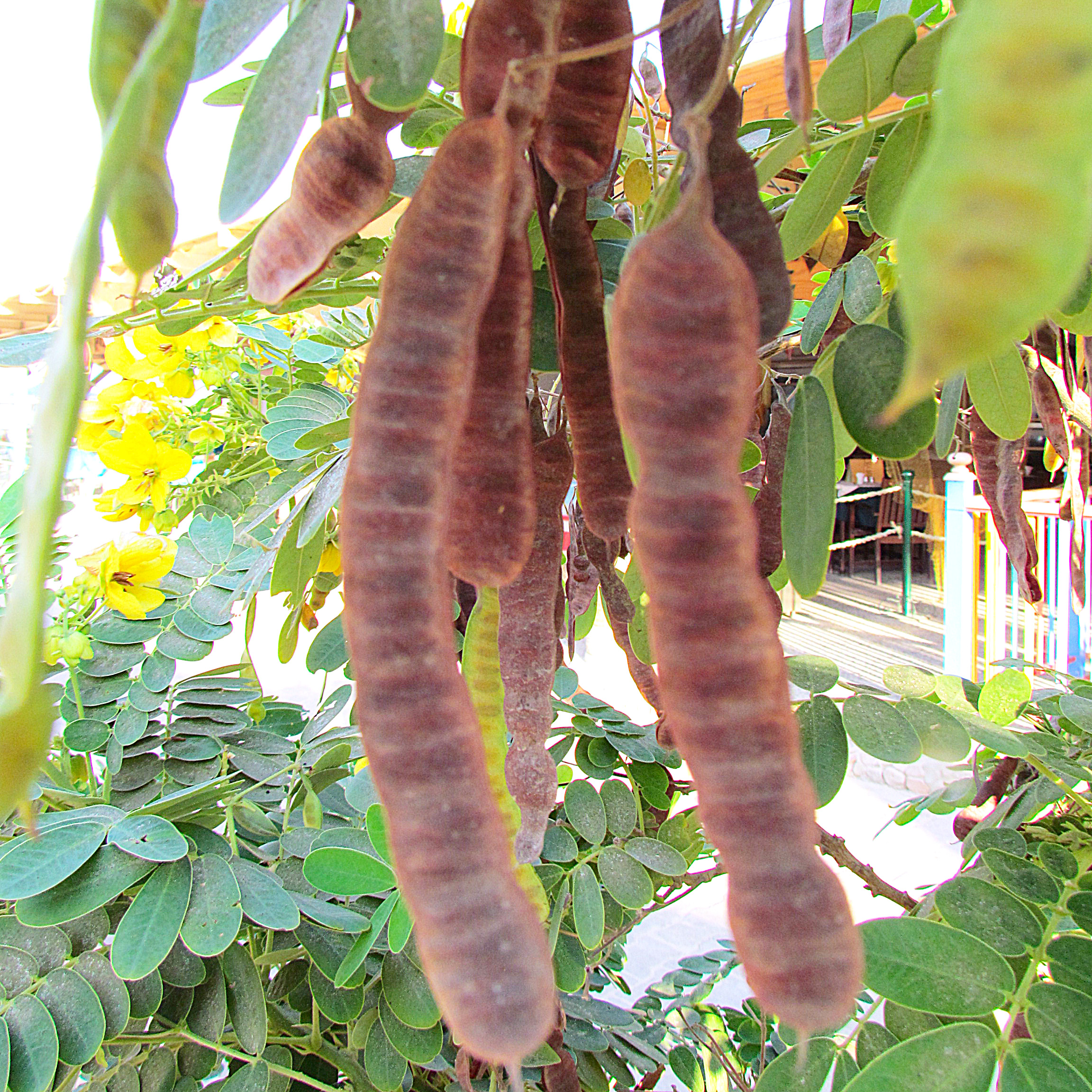
Seed pods

It grows as a shrub or small tree to 11 m high. Stems are hairy, sometimes sparsely to nearly glabrous. Leaves are compound, alternate. Stipules are linear, 2-3 mm long. Petiole is 2-6.5 cm long, channeled, thinly hairy. Stalked glands have leaflet pairs with 2-5 per leaf, solitary at lowest pair.

Leaflets number at 8-20, which are opposite, pinnately compound, paripinnate, upper leaflets are largest. Petiolules are 1-2 mm long. Leaflet blades are egg-shaped, oblong to obovate, 2.5-10 cm in length, 0.8-3 cm in width, base is round-shaped or cuneate, at times lopsided. Margins are entire, apex is round-shaped or emarginate. The side veins are made up of 6-12 pairs. Leaflets and rachis are lightly hairy to hairless. Older leaves may fall during drought or winter.

The plant has been confused with Senna sulfurea and Senna siamea, except that this plant has many more smaller leaflets, smaller brachystylous flowers and shorter, short-stipitate pod.

=== Inflorescences ===
Inflorescences are axillary in upper axils, flowers in umbellate racemes that consist of 4-10 bisexual, slightly zygomorphic flowers. Pedicels are 1.5-3 cm long. Sepals are rough, elliptic, 3-8 mm long, glabrous or sparsely hairy, and green. Petals are oblong-elliptic, 10-24 (-30) mm long, hairless or just mildly hairy, yellow, with a distinct venation. Fertile anthers 5-6 mm long; carpel is solitary, long and arched, ovary is superior and style is curved. 10 stamens are present and filaments are 1-2 mm long. Fruit is a dry, flat pod, 8-15 cm long. Flowers appear all year round.

== Distribution ==
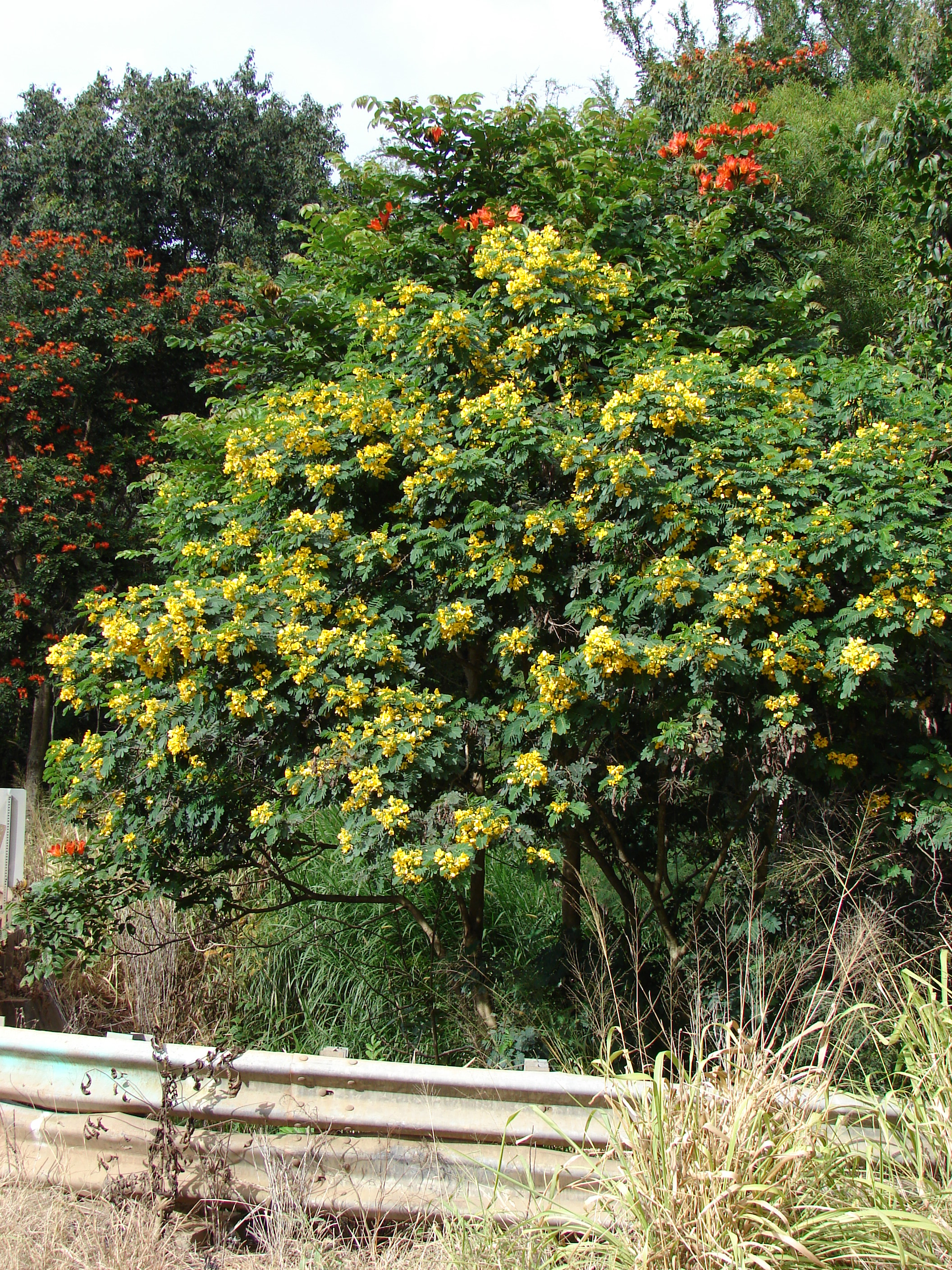
Growing in a scrubland

The origin of this species is still unclear. Antecedently, it was thought to be native to coastal north Australia and Malesia, but Symon (1966) stated that it was likely introduced there. Though Liogier and Martorell (2000) consider the species native to Australia. Agricultural Research Service (2014) lists the plant as native to Laos, Myanmar, the Philippines, Thailand, and Vietnam.

The species is known to occur in several tropical and subtropical regions including Southeast Asia, Africa, and the West Indies, where it has escaped into the wild, thereby naturalizing in these places. In Sri Lanka, the species is commonly planted, except that it is not naturalized. Elsewhere, it is found on roadsides, pastures, and wastelands in the lower altitudes. In Southeast Asia, it thrives in teak forests and boggy soils, whereas in Hawaii it grow in volcanic zones and coastal forests.

== Cultivation ==
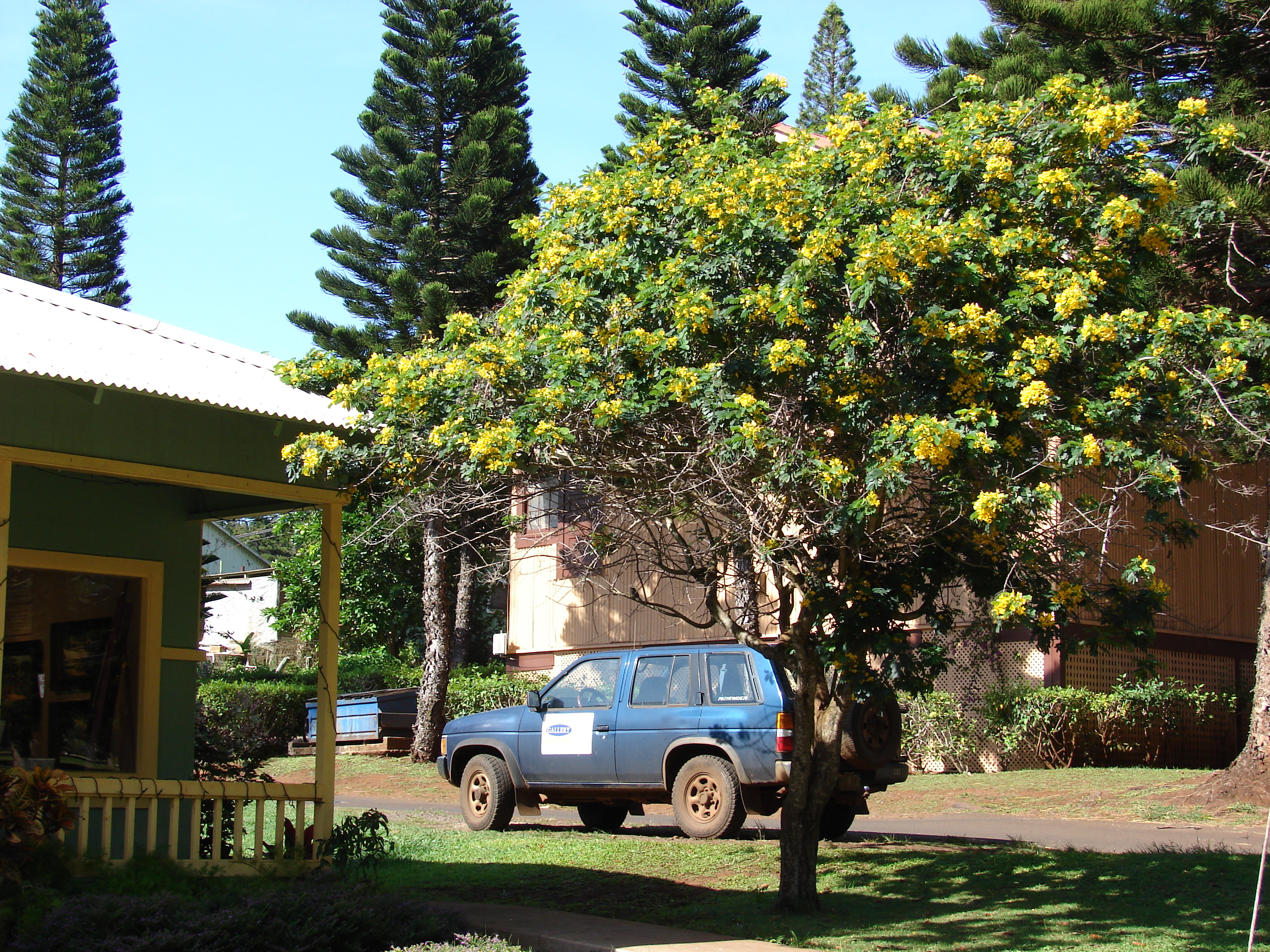
Roadside tree in Lanai City

Having a medium tolerance for drought (especially after being established), the plant grows in well-drained, moist, loamy and marshy soils where it is planted in roadsides, parks, small gardens where it is used as a shade tree and a hedge plant. It can easily be toppled by heavy winds, therefore it needs many years to become established in ground. Hardy to USDA zone 9, it prefers to be fertilized monthly. Furthermore, the plant withstands sulphur dioxide pollution, thereby making it a commonly planted ornamental in populated regions like the Philippines and Hong Kong. It is propagated by seed.

It is noted to have been cultivated on St. Vincent and the Windward Islands prior to 1826. It may have been included (as Cassia glauca Lam.) in Grisebach's flora on the British West Indies, where it was reported in Jamaica, Saint Kitts, Antigua and St. Vincent, and also native to Guadeloupe (which is unlikely) and the East Indies. It also may have been cultivated in Trinidad by 1870 and it was introduced as an ornamental plant in Puerto Rico just after 1826. In Hawaii, it was naturalized by 1871 and in Sri Lanka it was present there since 1824.

=== Uses ===
In Southeast Asia, its juvenile leaves are cooked and eaten as a vegetable. In the Philippines, it is used in teak plantations as a shade tree and hedge plant. The roots have been used to treat gonorrhoea, its leaves for dysentery, and flowers as a laxative.

== Invasiveness ==
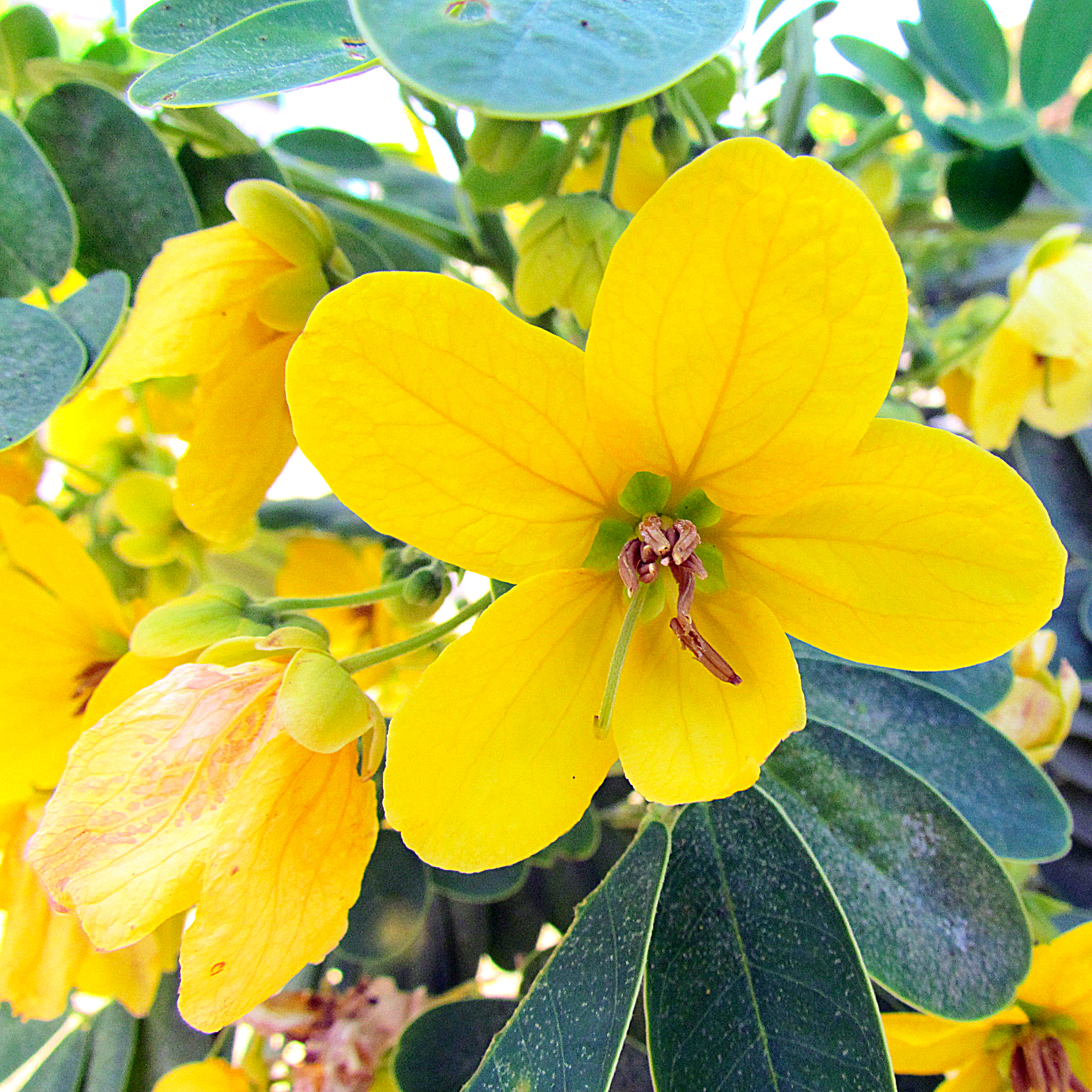
Flower close-up

The plant is listed as an environmental weed and a cultivation escape in the Global Compendium of Weeds, where it smothers pastures and has a history of perennial introductions outside of its endemic range. Its spread is mainly by human cultivation rather than by seed dispersal though. It is classified as an invasive species in various Asian and Pacific countries such as Singapore, Taiwan, French Polynesia, and Micronesia, including Hawaii.

The plant produces seeds abundantly, with 20 seeds per pod. However, the plant's risk of introduction is moderate, since the seeds are heavy and unable to disperse by the wind (the pods generally stay on the plant, so the seeds do not fall and germinate). Moreover, dispersal by animals is unlikely because the pods do not have pulp to draw them in.

== Predation ==
Catopsilia scylla and Catopsilia pomona consume the leaves. Eurema blanda only eats the young leaves, and Oecophylla smaragdina will frequently build nests on the plant.
