= Zabrotes cruciger =

Scientific classification
- Kingdom: Animalia
- Phylum: Arthropoda
- Class: Insecta
- Order: Coleoptera
- Suborder: Polyphaga
- Infraorder: Cucujiformia
- Family: Chrysomelidae
- Genus: Zabrotes
- Species: Z. cruciger

Binomial name
- Zabrotes cruciger Horn, 1885

Species of beetle

Zabrotes cruciger is a species of leaf beetle in the family Chrysomelidae. It is found in North America, specifically in the south-central to south-western United States.

Zabrotes cruciger measure 2.1–2.9 mm (0.083–0.114 in) in length.
