= Senna leptoclada =

Scientific classification
- Kingdom: Plantae
- Clade: Tracheophytes
- Clade: Angiosperms
- Clade: Eudicots
- Clade: Rosids
- Order: Fabales
- Family: Fabaceae
- Subfamily: Caesalpinioideae
- Genus: Senna
- Species: S. leptoclada

Binomial name
- Senna leptoclada (Benth.) Randell

Synonyms
- Cassia leptoclada Benth.

Species of legume

Senna leptoclada is a species of flowering plant in the family Fabaceae and is endemic to Arnhem Land in northern Australia. It is a glaucous, erect to drooping shrub with pinnate leaves usually with two pairs of broadly elliptic leaflets, and yellow flowers arranged in groups of two or three, with ten fertile stamens in each flower.

== Description ==
Senna leptoclada is a glaucous, erect to drooping shrub that typically grows to a height of up to 3 m (9.8 ft). The leaves are 30–70 mm (1.2–2.8 in) long on a petiole 10–25 mm (0.39–0.98 in) long, usually with two pairs of broadly elliptic leaflets 15–30 mm (0.59–1.18 in) long and 8–20 mm (0.31–0.79 in) wide, spaced 10–20 mm (0.39–0.79 in) apart. The flowers are deep yellow and arranged in groups of two or three in leaf axils along the branches, on a peduncle 5–15 mm (0.20–0.59 in) long, each flower on a pedicel 10–20 mm (0.39–0.79 in) long. The petals are 11–14 mm (0.43–0.55 in) long and there are ten fertile stamens in each flower, the anthers 3–4 mm (0.12–0.16 in) long and of different lengths. Flowering occurs in autumn and spring and the fruit is a flat pod 10–15 mm (0.39–0.59 in) long and about 10 mm (0.39 in) wide.

== Taxonomy ==
This species was first formally described in 1864 by George Bentham who gave it the name Cassia leptoclada in Flora Australiensis, from specimens collected in the Gulf of Carpentaria by Robert Brown. In 1998, Barbara Rae Randell transferred the species to Senna as Senna leptoclada in the Journal of the Adelaide Botanic Gardens. The specific epithet (leptoclada) means "thin-stemmed".

== Distribution and habitat ==
Senna leptoclada is only known from Arnhem Land in the Northern Territory of Australia.
