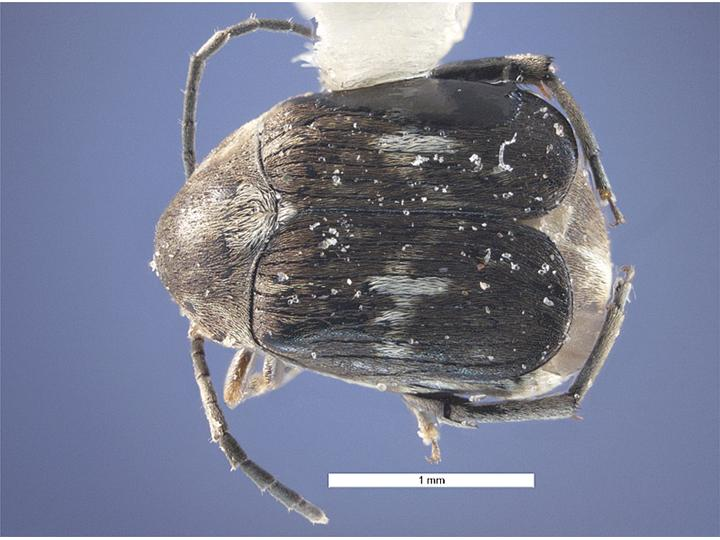

Scientific classification
- Kingdom: Animalia
- Phylum: Arthropoda
- Class: Insecta
- Order: Coleoptera
- Suborder: Polyphaga
- Infraorder: Cucujiformia
- Family: Chrysomelidae
- Genus: Zabrotes
- Species: Z. subfasciatus

Binomial name
- Zabrotes subfasciatus (Boheman, 1833)

= Zabrotes subfasciatus =

Mexican bean weevil

Species of beetle

Zabrotes subfasciatus, the Mexican bean weevil, is a species of leaf beetle in the family Chrysomelidae. It is found in Africa, North America, South America, Southern Asia, and Europe.

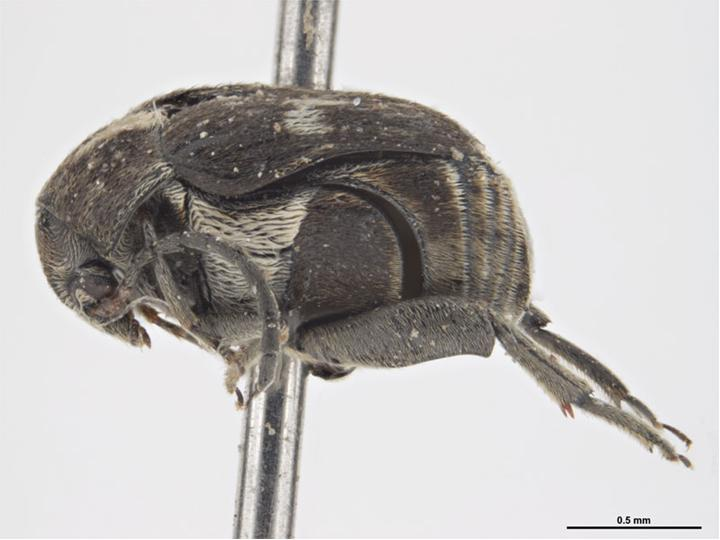
Mexican bean weevil, Zabrotes subfasciatus

1833), commonly known as the Mexican bean weevil, is one of the main pests of the common bean (Phaseolus vulgaris) that affect seeds during storage (Morales et al., 2018). Weevils lay the eggs on the seed coat and then larvae feed and grow inside, which results in serious affectations including hollow grains with reduced nutritional quality and loss of viability. The economic impact caused by this insect pest has been reported to reach up to 35% production loss.

Several chemical control methods have been effectively tested against bruchids; however, the use of toxic pesticides in a product that is about to be consumed represents a high risk, both for humans and the environment, which has evidenced the need for viable strategies to control the bean weevil through less harmful options that improve food safety and are compatible with sustainable production systems. Taking into consideration that the high fecundity of the Mexican Bean Weevil is attributed to standard room temperature conditions, a potential solution is to adjust the temperature in the storage rooms where infestation has occurred. By lowering the temperature to colder degrees, the egg mortality rate is deterred significantly, and the preservation of the crop is prolonged due to the colder conditions.
