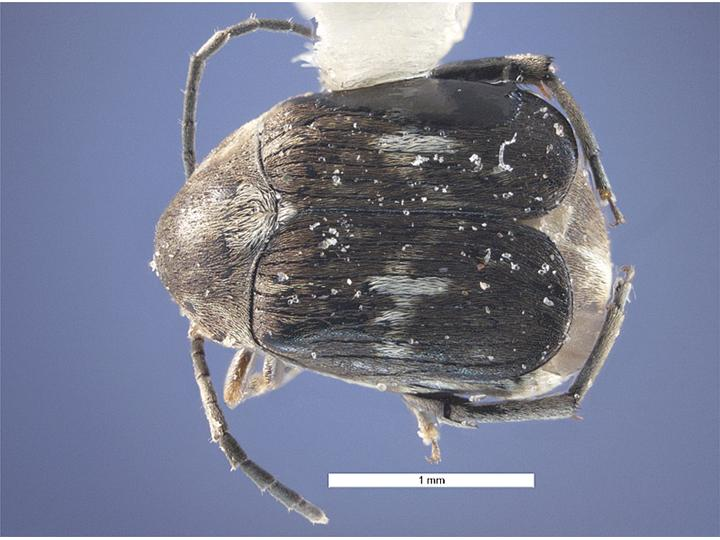
- Zabrotes subfasciatus

Scientific classification
- Kingdom: Animalia
- Phylum: Arthropoda
- Class: Insecta
- Order: Coleoptera
- Suborder: Polyphaga
- Infraorder: Cucujiformia
- Family: Chrysomelidae
- Subfamily: Bruchinae
- Tribe: Amblycerini
- Genus: Zabrotes; Horn, 1885

= Zabrotes =

Genus of beetles

Zabrotes is a genus of pea and bean weevils in the beetle family Chrysomelidae. They feed mostly on seeds in the family Fabaceae.

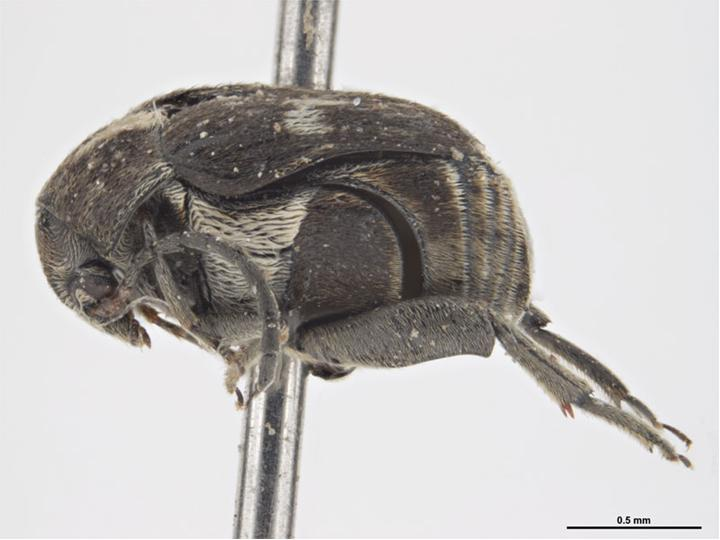
Zabrotes subfasciatus

== Species ==
These 21 species belong to the genus Zabrotes:

- Zabrotes amplissimus Kingsolver, 1990
- Zabrotes arenarius (Wolcott, 1912)
- Zabrotes bexarensis Kingsolver, 1990
- Zabrotes chandleri Kingsolver, 1990
- Zabrotes chavesi Kingsolver, 1980
- Zabrotes cruciger Horn, 1885
- Zabrotes cynthiae Kingsolver, 1990
- Zabrotes densus Horn, 1885
- Zabrotes eldenensis Kingsolver, 1990
- Zabrotes guerrerensis Romero & Johnson, 2000
- Zabrotes humboldtae Kingsolver, 1990
- Zabrotes moctezuma Romero & Johnson, 2000
- Zabrotes obliteratus Horn, 1885
- Zabrotes planifrons Horn, 1885
- Zabrotes sinaloensis Romero & Johnson, 2000
- Zabrotes spectabilis Horn, 1885
- Zabrotes stephani Kingsolver, 1990
- Zabrotes subfasciatus (Boheman, 1833) (Mexican bean weevil)
- Zabrotes subnitens (Horn, 1885)
- Zabrotes sylvestris Romero & Johnson, 1999
- Zabrotes victoriensis Kingsolver, 1990
