= Zabrotes subnitens =

Scientific classification
- Kingdom: Animalia
- Phylum: Arthropoda
- Class: Insecta
- Order: Coleoptera
- Suborder: Polyphaga
- Infraorder: Cucujiformia
- Family: Chrysomelidae
- Genus: Zabrotes
- Species: Z. subnitens

Binomial name
- Zabrotes subnitens Horn, 1885

Species of beetle

Zabrotes subnitens is a species of leaf beetle in the family Chrysomelidae. It is found in the eastern United States from Florida north to New Jersey and west to Arizona and Texas.

Zabrotes subnitens measure 2.1–2.3 mm (0.083–0.091 in) in length. They are black with sparse brown pubescence.
