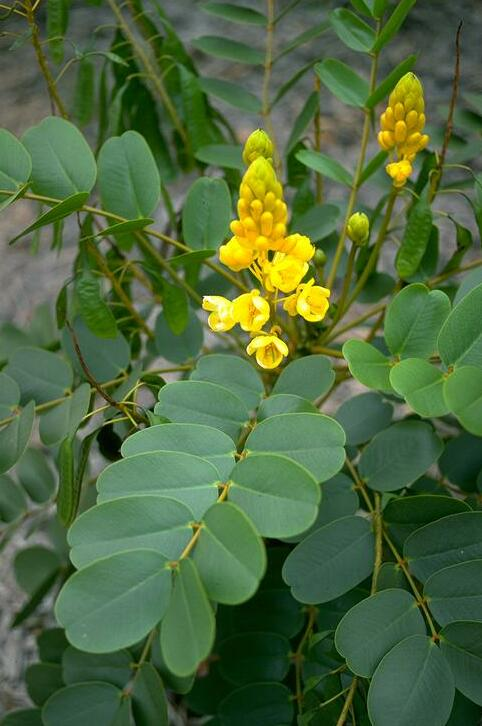

Scientific classification
- Kingdom: Plantae
- Clade: Tracheophytes
- Clade: Angiosperms
- Clade: Eudicots
- Clade: Rosids
- Order: Fabales
- Family: Fabaceae
- Subfamily: Caesalpinioideae
- Genus: Senna
- Species: S. magnifolia

Binomial name
- Senna magnifolia (F.Muell.) Randell

Synonyms
- Cassia magnifolia F.Muell.

= Senna magnifolia =

Species of legume

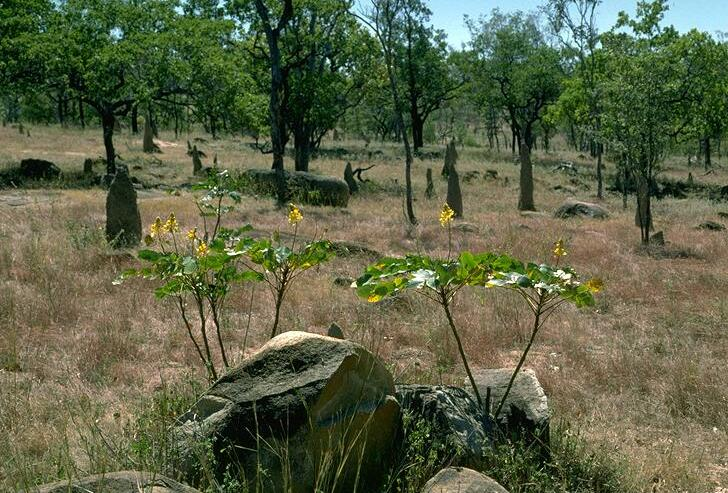
Habit near Georgetown, Queensland

Senna magnifolia is a species of flowering plant in the family Fabaceae and is endemic to northern Australia. It is an erect, spreading or straggling, mostly glabrous shrub with pinnate leaves with four to six pairs of broadly oblong to round leaflets, and yellow flowers arranged in groups of twenty to sixty, with seven fertile stamens in each flower.

== Description ==
Senna magnifolia is an erect, spreading or straggling shrub that typically grows to a height of up to 1.5 m (4 ft 11 in). The leaves are up to 300 mm (12 in) long on a petiole 80–100 mm (3.1–3.9 in) long, with four to six pairs of broadly oblong to round leaflets 50–80 mm (2.0–3.1 in) long and 30–50 mm (1.2–2.0 in) wide, spaced 25–45 mm (0.98–1.77 in) apart. The flowers are yellow and arranged in dense groups of twenty to sixty in leaf axils on a peduncle 100–150 mm (3.9–5.9 in) long, each flower on a pedicel 12–15 mm (0.47–0.59 in) long. The petals are of unequal lengths, 10–17 mm (0.39–0.67 in) long and there are seven fertile stamens and three staminodes in each flower, two anthers 8–10 mm (0.31–0.39 in) long and the other five 3–4 mm (0.12–0.16 in) long. Flowering occurs from May to July and the fruit is a flat pod 80–100 mm (3.1–3.9 in) long and about 30–40 mm (1.2–1.6 in) wide.

== Taxonomy ==
This species was first formally described in 1859 by Ferdinand von Mueller, who gave it the name Cassia magnifolia in Fragmenta Phytographiae Australiae, from specimens he collected near the Gilbert River at an altitude of 1,000 ft (300 m). In 1990, Barbara Rae Randell transferred the species to Senna as Senna magnifolia in the Journal of the Adelaide Botanic Gardens. The specific epithet (magnifolia) means "large-leaved".

== Distribution and habitat ==
Senna magnifolia grows on stony hillsides, limestone outcrops and quartzite hills in the Central Kimberley, Dampierland, Great Sandy Desert, Ord Victoria Plain and Victoria Bonaparte bioregions of northern Western Australia, the Northern Territory and northern Queensland.
