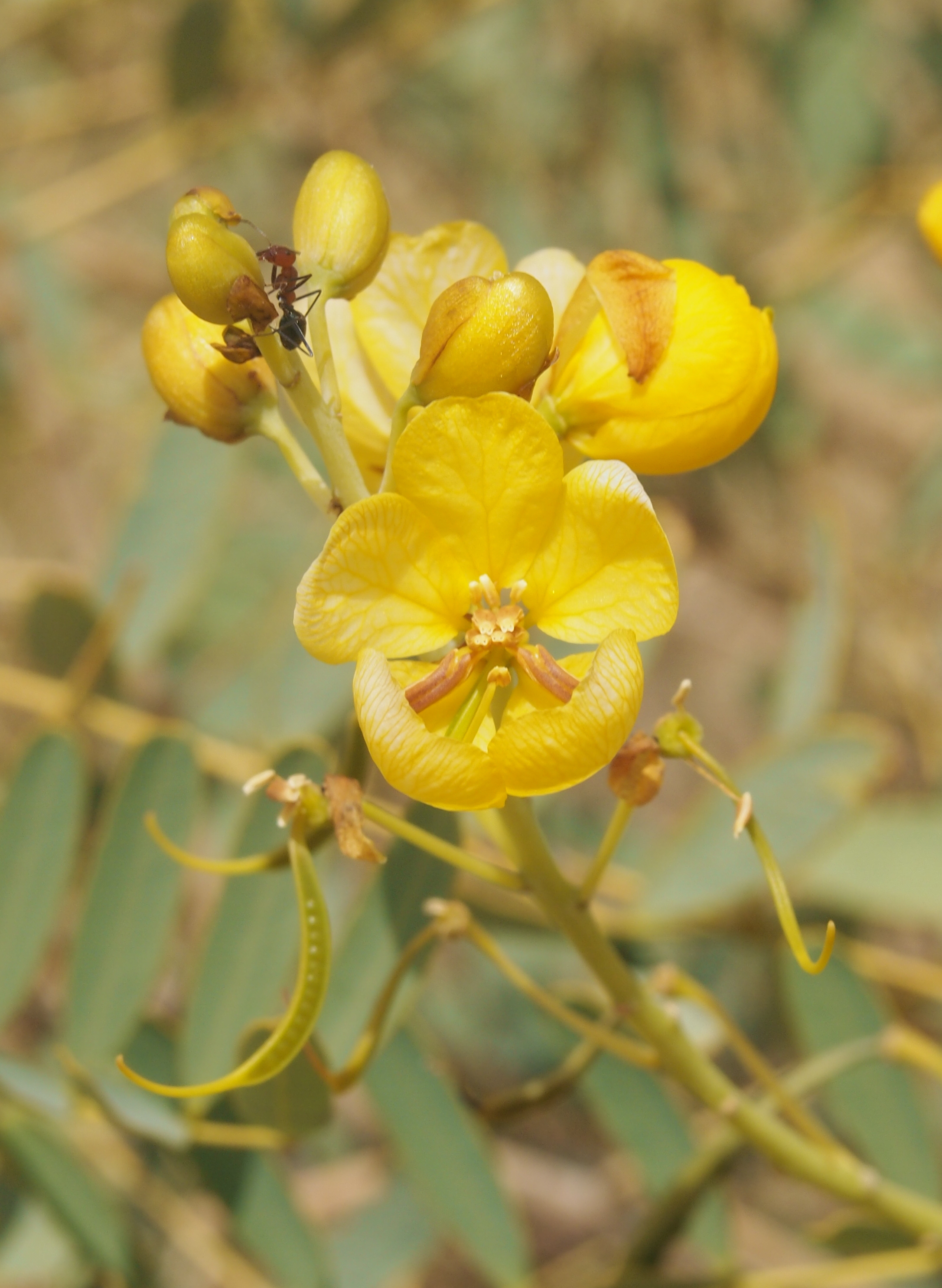

Scientific classification
- Kingdom: Plantae
- Clade: Tracheophytes
- Clade: Angiosperms
- Clade: Eudicots
- Clade: Rosids
- Order: Fabales
- Family: Fabaceae
- Subfamily: Caesalpinioideae
- Genus: Senna
- Species: S. pleurocarpa

Binomial name
- Senna pleurocarpa (F.Muell.) Randell

Synonyms
- Cassia pleurocarpa F.Muell.

= Senna pleurocarpa =

Species of legume

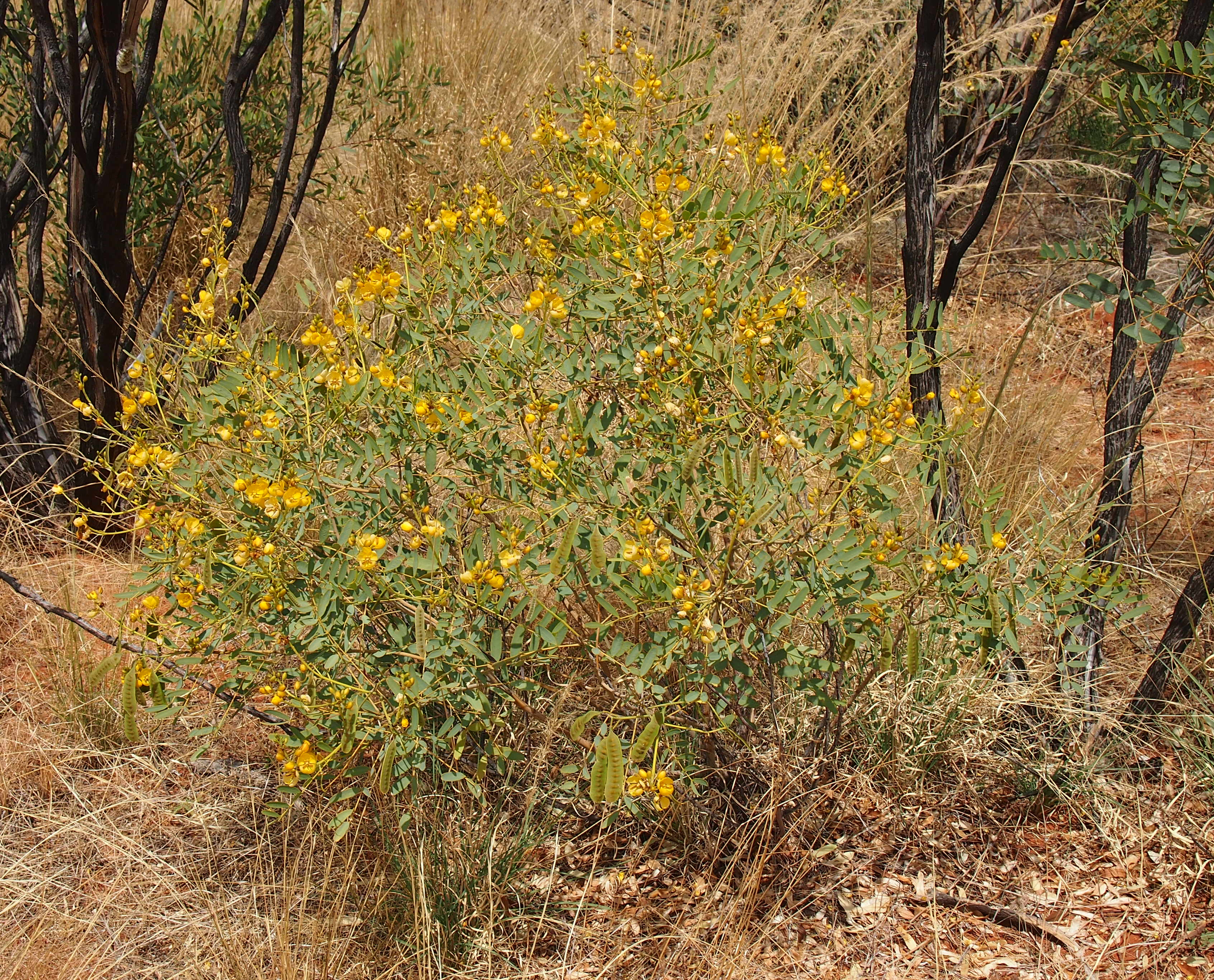
Habit in the Northern Territory

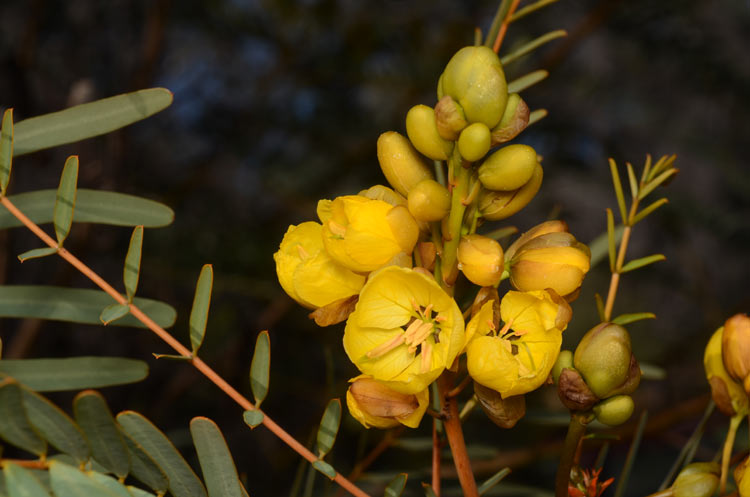
Variety longifolia in Idalia National Park

Senna pleurocarpa, commonly known as fire bush or chocolate bush, is a species of flowering plant in the family Fabaceae and is endemic to Australia. It is a spreading shrub with pinnate leaves with five to seven pairs of broadly elliptic to egg-shaped leaflets, and groups of five to twelve yellow flowers arranged in dense groups of twenty to sixty on the ends of branches and in upper leaf axils.

== Description ==
Senna planitiicola is a spreading, glabrous shrub that typically grows to a height of 0.2–1.5 m (7.9 in – 4 ft 11.1 in). Its leaves are pinnate, 80–120 mm (3.1–4.7 in) long including a petiole 20–40 mm (0.79–1.57 in) long, with five to twelve pairs of linear to elliptic leaflets, 30–60 mm (1.2–2.4 in) long and 5–15 mm (0.20–0.59 in) wide, spaced 15–20 mm (0.59–0.79 in) apart. There are no glands on the leaves. The flowers are yellow and arranged in groups of twenty to sixty on the ends of branches and in upper leaf axils on a peduncle 20–80 mm (0.79–3.15 in) long, each flower on a pedicel 10–25 mm (0.39–0.98 in) long. The petals are about 15 mm (0.59 in) long and there are seven fertile stamens, the longest anthers about 10 mm (0.39 in) long and the others 3–4 mm (0.12–0.16 in) long, as well as three staminodes. Flowering occurs in from July to December, and the fruit is a straight pod 35–70 mm (1.4–2.8 in) long and 8–12 mm (0.31–0.47 in) wide.

== Taxonomy ==
This species was first formally described in 1859 by Ferdinand von Mueller who gave it the name Cassia pleurocarpa in Fragmenta Phytographiae Australiae, from specimens collected by Augustus Oldfield near the Murchison River. In 1990, Barbara Rae Randell transferred the species to Senna as S. pleurocarpa in the Journal of the Adelaide Botanic Garden. The specific epithet (pleurocarpa) means "rib-fruited".

In the same journal, Randell described three varieties of S. pleurocarpa, and the names are accepted by the Australian Plant Census:

- Senna pleurocarpa var. angustifolia (Symon) Randell has eight or nine pairs of leaflets, the flowers with more or less persistent, pointed bracts up to 15 mm (0.59 in) long.
- Senna pleurocarpa var. longifolia (Symon) Randell has eleven or twelve pairs of leaflets.
- Senna pleurocarpa (F.Muell.) Randell var. pleurocarpa has five to seven pairs of leaflets, the flowers with more or rounded bracts up to 12 mm (0.47 in) long.

== Distribution and habitat ==
Senna pleurocarpa grows in arid areas of the Northern Territory and all mainland states of Australia, apart from Victoria. Variety angustifolia is widespread in Western Australia, where it grows in subtropical to temperate, semi-arid areas of that state, var. longifolia only occurs in central-western Queensland, and subspecies pleurocarpa occurs in the Northern Territory and in all mainland states except Victoria and grows in semiarid areas, especially in disturbed sites. In New South Wales, var. pleurocarpa grows in inland areas north from Milparinka and near Tibooburra.
