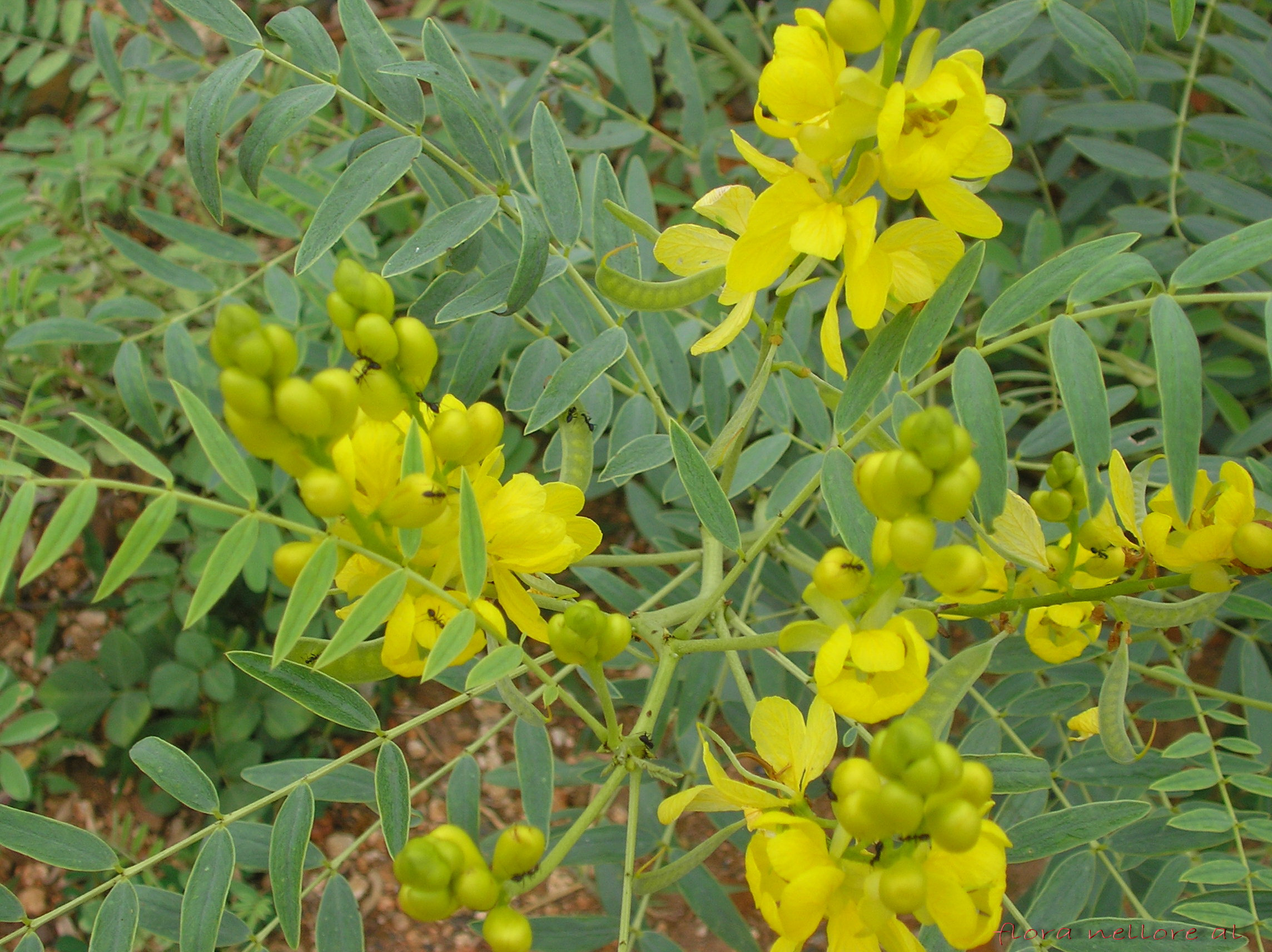

Conservation status
- Least Concern (IUCN 3.1)

Scientific classification
- Kingdom: Plantae
- Clade: Embryophytes
- Clade: Tracheophytes
- Clade: Angiosperms
- Clade: Eudicots
- Clade: Rosids
- Order: Fabales
- Family: Fabaceae
- Subfamily: Caesalpinioideae
- Genus: Senna
- Species: S. alexandrina

Binomial name
- Senna alexandrina Mill.

Synonyms
- Many, see § Names and taxonomy

= Senna alexandrina =

Species of legume

Senna alexandrina (Alexandrian senna, in Arabic عشرج or عشرق or سنامكي and see below) is an ornamental plant in the genus Senna. It is used in herbalism. It grows natively in upper Egypt, especially in the Nubian region, and near Khartoum (Sudan), where it is cultivated commercially. It is also grown elsewhere, notably in India and Somalia.

Not native to the USSR, it was farmed in southern Kazakhstan for medicine.

== Description ==
Alexandrian Senna is a shrubby plant that reaches 0.5–1 metres (20" to 40"), rarely two metres (6') in height with a branched, pale-green erect stem and long spreading branches bearing four or five pairs of leaves. These leaves form complex, feathery, mutual pairs. The leaflets vary from 4 to 6 pairs, fully edged, with a sharp top. The midribs are equally divided at the base of the leaflets.

The flowers are in a raceme interior blossoms, big in size, coloured yellow that tends to brown. Its legume fruit are horned, broadly oblong, compressed and flat and contain about six seeds.

== Uses ==
When cultivated as medicinal herb, the plants are cut down semi-annually, dried in the sun, stripped and packed in palm-leaf bags. They are then sent on camels to Essouan and Darao, then down the Nile to Cairo or else to Red Sea ports. Trade in senna provides a significant source of income for the nomadic Ababda.

== Names and taxonomy ==
Senna alexandrina is also known under the names Egyptian senna, Tinnevelly senna, East Indian senna or the French séné de la palthe.

It received the names Alexandrian senna and Egyptian senna because Alexandria in Egypt was the main trade port in past times. The fruits and leaves were transported from Nubia and Sudan and other places to Alexandria, then from it and across the Mediterranean sea to Europe and adjacent Asia.

Though it might look like a scientific name, Cassia Officinalis is actually the apothecary term for this plant, and hence Officinalis—the Latin adjective denoting tools, utensils and medical compounds—is written with an initial upper-case letter, unlike specific epithets, which are always written with an initial lower-case letter today.

Synonyms:

- Cassia acutifolia Delile
- Cassia alexandrina (Garsault) Thell.
- Cassia angustifolia M. Vahl
- Cassia lanceolata Collad. (former name)

C. lanceolata Link is a synonym of Senna sophera var. sophera
C. lanceolata Pers. is a synonym of Chamaecrista desvauxii var. mollissima

- Cassia lenitiva Bisch.
- Cassia senna Linn.
- Senna acutifolia (Delile) Batka
- Senna alexandrina Garsault
- Senna angustifolia (Vahl) Batka

== Traditional medicine ==
Historically, Senna alexandrina was used in the form of senna pods, or as herbal tea made from the leaves, as a laxative. Traditional medicine has used senna extracts since ancient times as a laxative. It also serves as a fungicide.

=== Potential for liver damage ===
Senna products contain anthraquinones, which if ingested can cause liver disease. The active ingredients are several senna glycosides which interact with immune cells in the colon. If accidentally ingested by infants, it can cause side effects such as severe diaper rash.

== See also ==
- List of herbs with known adverse effects
