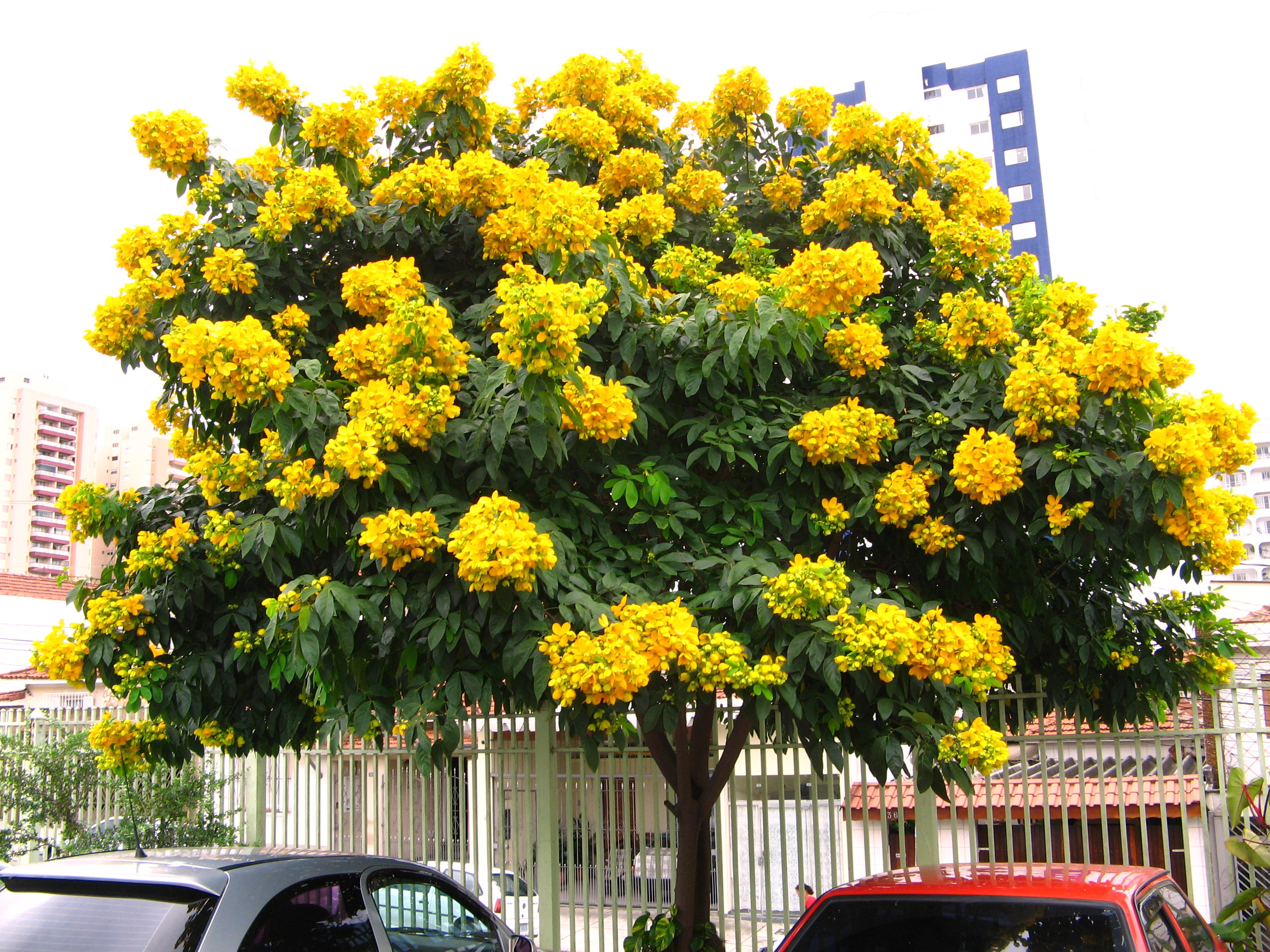

Scientific classification
- Kingdom: Plantae
- Clade: Tracheophytes
- Clade: Angiosperms
- Clade: Eudicots
- Clade: Rosids
- Order: Fabales
- Family: Fabaceae
- Subfamily: Caesalpinioideae
- Genus: Senna
- Species: S. macranthera

Binomial name
- Senna macranthera (Collad.) H.S.Irwin & Barneby

= Senna macranthera =

Species of legume

Senna macranthera is a tree in the family of Fabaceae.

With a height of 6 to 9 m, it has an abundance of yellow flowers from December to April in its homelands.

== Origin ==
It originates in the north of South America.
