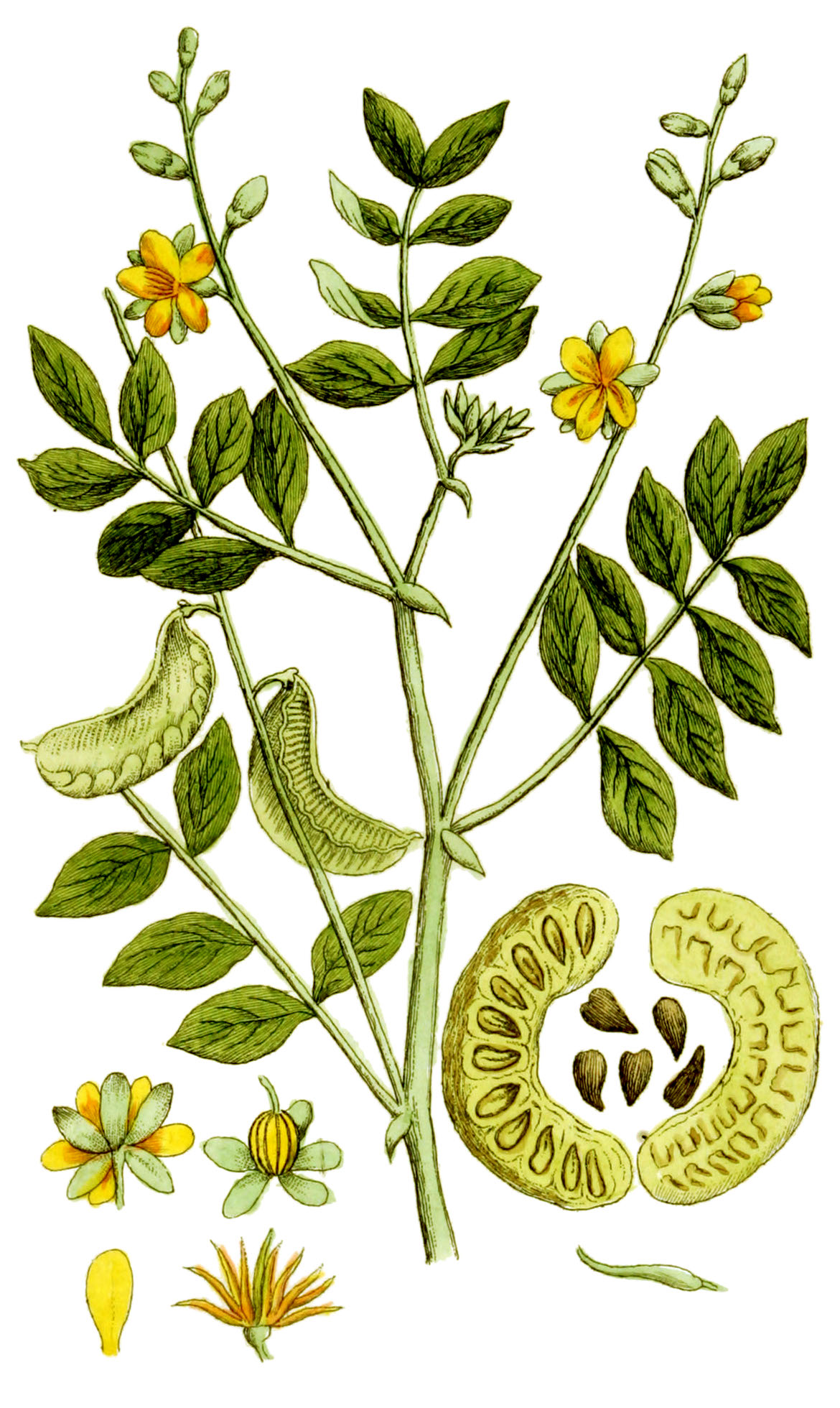
- Senna alexandrina

Scientific classification
- Kingdom: Plantae
- Clade: Embryophytes
- Clade: Tracheophytes
- Clade: Angiosperms
- Clade: Eudicots
- Clade: Rosids
- Order: Fabales
- Family: Fabaceae
- Subfamily: Caesalpinioideae
- Tribe: Cassieae
- Genus: Senna; Mill.

Type species
- Senna alexandrina Mill.

Species
- Over 300; see List of Senna species

Synonyms
- List: Adipera Raf. 1838; Cassia (Mill.) Benth. 1871; Cassia sect. Senna (Tournefort) DC. ex Colladon 1816; Cassia sect. Senna sensu Benth. 1865; Cassia subgen. Senna Benth. 1870; Cathartocarpus (partim); Chamaefistula (DC.) G. Don; Chamaesenna (DC.) Raf. ex Pittier; Desmodiocassia Britton & Rose; Diallobus; Earleocassia Britton; Echinocassia Britton & Rose; Gaumerocassia Britton; Herpetica (DC.) Raf.; Isandrina; Leonocassia Britton; Palmerocassia Britton; Peiranisia Raf.; Phragmocassia Britton & Rose; Pseudocassia Britton & Rose; Pterocassia Britton & Rose; Sciacassia Britton; Senna sensu Gaertn. 1791; Senna sensu Link 1831; Senna sensu Roxb. 1832; Sericeocassia Britton; Tharpia Britton & Rose; Vogelocassia Britton; Xerocassia Britton & Rose

= Senna (plant) =

Genus of flowering leguminous plants

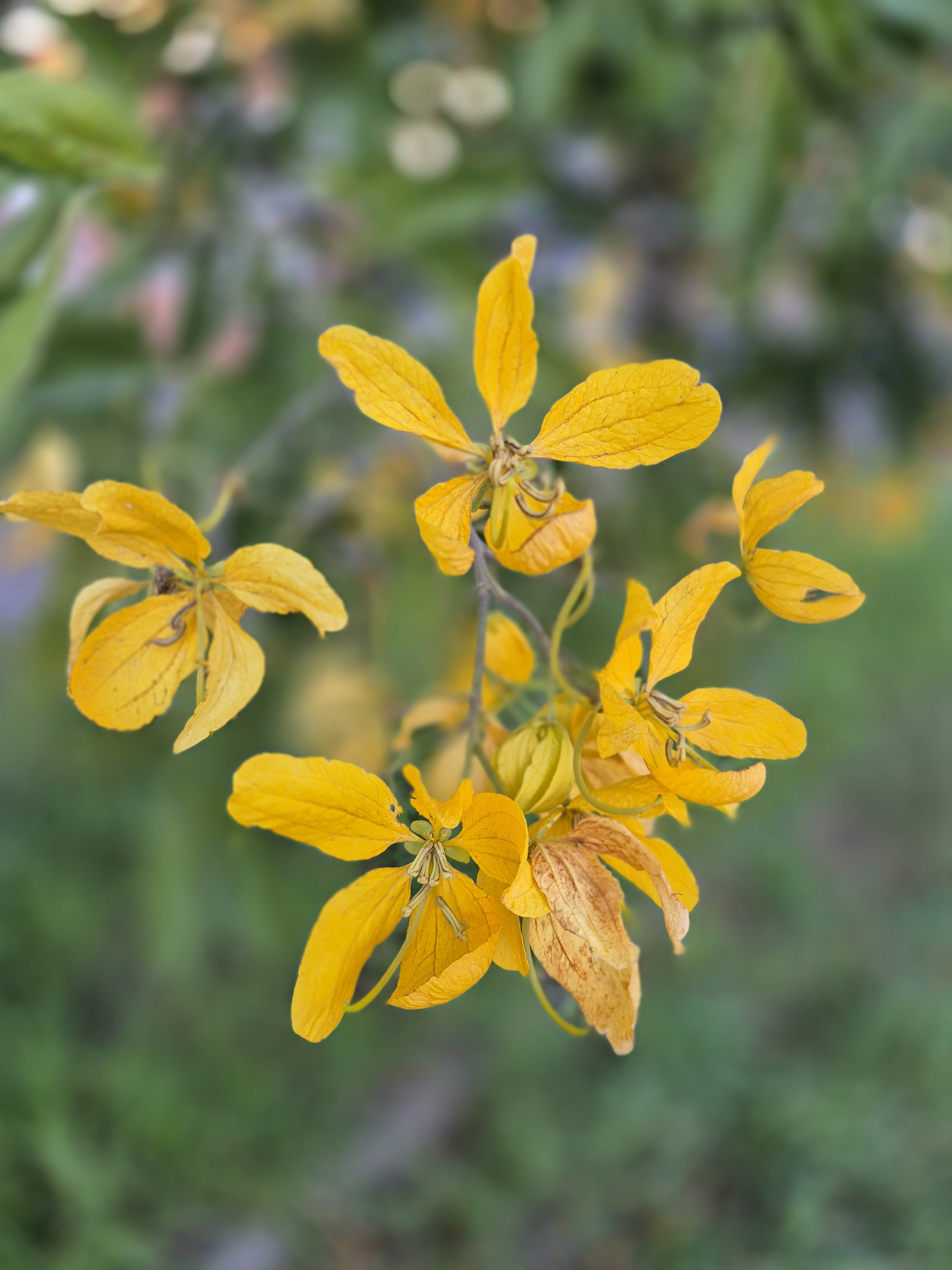
Senna sp., possibly Senna macranthera

Senna, the sennas, is a large genus of flowering plants in the legume family (Fabaceae, subfamily Caesalpinioideae, tribe Cassieae). This diverse genus is native throughout the tropics, with a small number of species in temperate regions. The number of species is estimated to be from about 260 to 350. The type species for the genus is Senna alexandrina. About 50 species of Senna are known in cultivation.

== Description ==
Plants in the genus Senna are shrubs, sometimes small trees or perennial herbs. The leaves are arranged alternately, paripinnate with up to 25 pairs of leaflets, each leaf with a stipule at the base, but that often falls off as the leaves mature. The flowers are arranged in racemes in leaf axils with bracts at the base. The flower has five egg-shaped green or yellowish sepals and five usually yellow, usually glabrous petals. There are usually ten stamens that are free from each other, the filaments of different lengths, and some are staminodes. The fruit is a leathery pod containing several seeds.

== Taxonomy and systematics ==
Chamaecrista, Cassia, and Senna form a monophyletic group which some authors have called Cassia sensu lato. In 1982, the group was named Cassiinae and classified as a subtribe of the tribe Cassieae. The tribe Cassieae contains 21 genera and is now known to be polyphyletic, but the classification is still accepted because a revision of Fabaceae has yet to be published.

The genus Senna has had a complex taxonomic history. What is now known as Senna was included by Linnaeus in his concept of Cassia in Species Plantarum in 1753. Philip Miller segregated Senna from Cassia in 1754 in the fourth edition of The Gardeners Dictionary. Until 1982, many authors, following Linnaeus, did not recognize Senna and Chamaecrista, but included them in a broadly circumscribed Cassia sensu lato. Phylogenetic analyses of DNA have shown that Chamaecrista, Cassia, and Senna are all monophyletic, but the relationships between these three genera have not been resolved. They are therefore shown in phylogenetic trees as a tritomy.

Recent advances in the taxonomy and evolution of Senna worldwide have been published by Alexandre Gibau de Lima and Roseli Bortoluzzi. These studies include the description of new species from the Neotropical region, taxonomic revisions, integrative studies combining genomics, morphometrics, morphology, as well as phylogenetic and biogeographic analyses.

A fossil seed pod of a Senna sp. from the middle Eocene epoch has been described from the Rancho clay pit in Henry County, Tennessee, United States.

=== Etymology ===
The genus name derives from the Arabic sanā, describing plants whose leaves and pods have cathartic and laxative properties.

== Ecology ==
The caterpillars of many species feed on Senna plants. The black witch (Ascalapha odorata), two-barred flasher (Astraptes fulgerator), common emigrant (Catopsilia pomona), and mottled emigrant (C. pyranthe) have all been recorded on candle bush (S. alata), for example.

Some species have extrafloral nectaries on the leaves or flower stalks that are visited by ants.

=== Pollination ===
Senna species are pollinated by a variety of bees, especially large female bees in genera such as Xylocopa. They rely on "buzz pollination" and some within that on "ricochet pollination", which is a secondary pollen presentation where the pollen is not deposited on the pollinator's body by direct contact with the anthers. The flowers have two sets of stamen: feeding stamens, which are longer, and pollinating stamens, which are smaller in size. Due to buzz pollination, the pollens from the pollinating stamens get thrown from the anthers and ricochets against the petals multiple times before it settles on the dorsal side of the pollinating bee. The roughness on the petal walls causes the pollen to slow down its speed. The ricocheting effect alone cannot ensure effective pollen dissemination. It is aided by static charges wherein the flying bees become positively charged owing to the friction in the air and the pollen becomes negatively charged because of which they naturally get attracted to the bee's body. The pollinator bee ends up carrying the pollen and also gets to feed on the pollen which is on the feeding stamens.

== Uses ==
Some Senna species are used as ornamental plants in landscaping. The genus is adapted to many climate types.

Cassia gum, an extract of the seeds of Chinese senna (S. obtusifolia), is used as a thickening agent. The leaves and flowers of Siamese cassia (S. siamea) are used in some Southeast Asian cuisines, such as Thai, Shan/Burmese and Lao cuisines. They are known as khi-lek in Thai, and are used in curries.

=== Laxative ===
Senna is considered to be a bowel stimulant on the myenteric plexus of the colon to induce peristaltic contractions and decrease water absorption from inside the colon, effects that would provide relief from constipation. The laxative syrup of figs gets most of the desired effect from the presence of senna.

Plants in the Senna genus have been studied for their beneficial effects arising from the abundance of phytochemicals, bioactive components and antioxidant and antimicrobial properties.

Senna and the sennosides, alone or in combination with sorbitol or lactulose, have been evaluated in systematic reviews and Cochrane reviews for treatment of constipation in children and the elderly. Some studies showed limited evidence for efficacy, whereas others indicated the study designs were too weak to be certain of senna having utility as a laxative.
