= Leioproctus arenarius =

Scientific classification
- Kingdom: Animalia
- Phylum: Arthropoda
- Clade: Pancrustacea
- Class: Insecta
- Order: Hymenoptera
- Family: Colletidae
- Genus: Leioproctus
- Species: L. arenarius

Binomial name
- Leioproctus arenarius Batley, 2025

Species of bee

Leioproctus arenarius, or Leioproctus (Euryglossidia) arenarius, is a species of bee in the family Colletidae and subfamily Colletinae. It is endemic to Australia. It was described by entomologist Michael Batley in 2025.

== Etymology ==
The specific epithet arenarius means "associated with sand" and is a habitat reference.

== Description ==
Female body length is 6.5 mm, male body length 5 mm. Integumental colouration is mainly black with brown markings. The hair is white to pale brown.

== Distribution and habitat ==
The species occurs in Western Australia. The type locality is 13 km south of Wannoo in the Gascoyne region.

== Behaviour ==
The adults are flying mellivores. Flowering plants visited by the bees include Hakea, Cassiaand Acacia species.
