= Cassia fikifiki =

Conservation status
- Endangered (IUCN 2.3)

Scientific classification
- Kingdom: Plantae
- Clade: Tracheophytes
- Clade: Angiosperms
- Clade: Eudicots
- Clade: Rosids
- Order: Fabales
- Family: Fabaceae
- Subfamily: Caesalpinioideae
- Genus: Cassia
- Species: C. fikifiki

Binomial name
- Cassia fikifiki Aubrév. & Pellegr.

Species of legume

Cassia fikifiki is an uncommon small rainforest species of tree in the family Fabaceae. It is found in Côte d'Ivoire and Liberia. It is a deciduous tree with a showy pendulous inflorescences of bright yellow flowers, and is easily confused in foliage with the common savanna tree Cassia sieberiana.

It is threatened by habitat loss and overharvesting as an aphrodisiac. The bark has been investigated for antifilarial properties.
