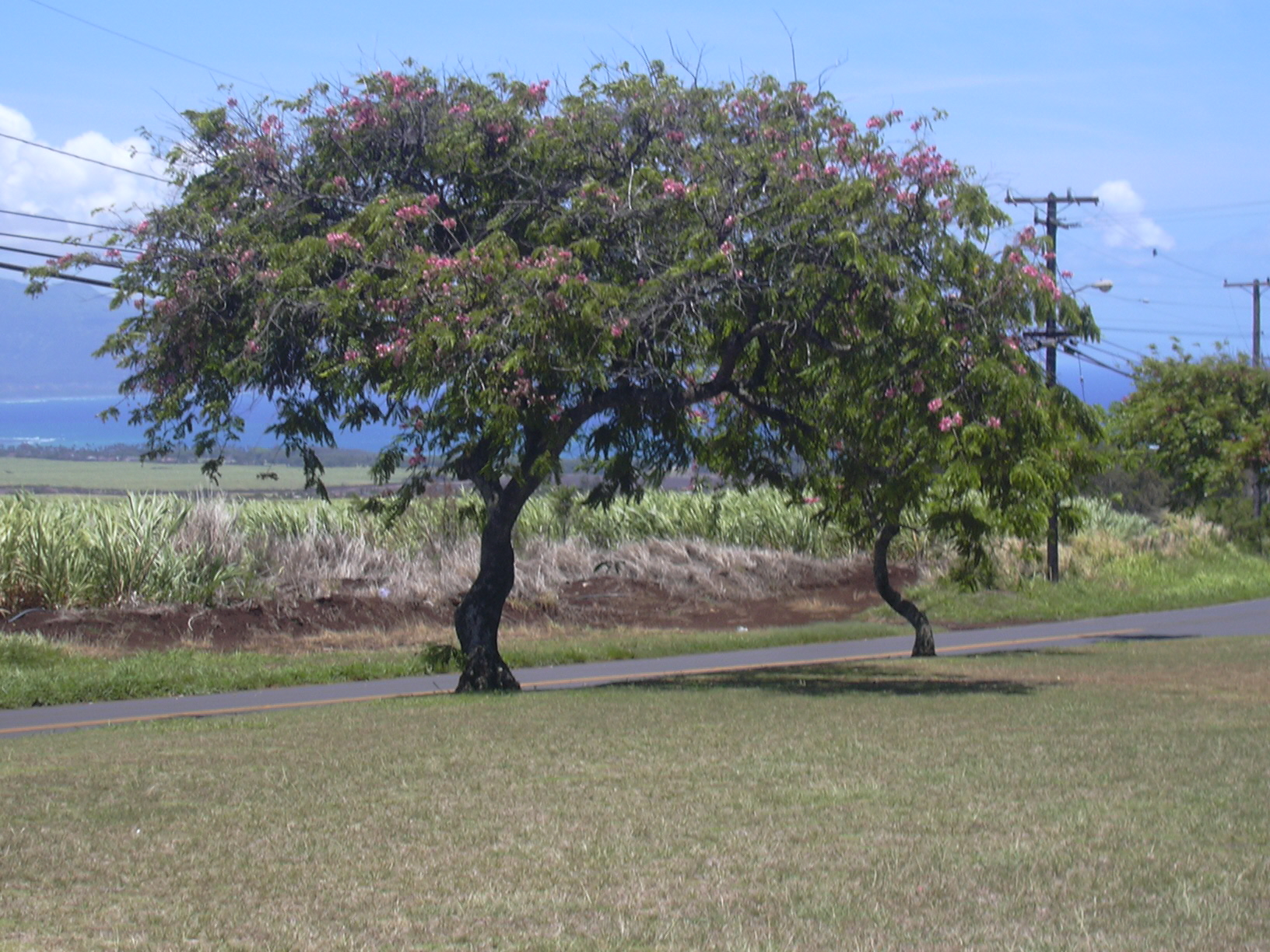

Scientific classification
- Kingdom: Plantae
- Clade: Embryophytes
- Clade: Tracheophytes
- Clade: Spermatophytes
- Clade: Angiosperms
- Clade: Eudicots
- Clade: Rosids
- Order: Fabales
- Family: Fabaceae
- Subfamily: Caesalpinioideae
- Genus: Cassia
- Species: C. javanica

Binomial name
- Cassia javanica L.

Synonyms
- Bactyrilobium javanica (L.) Hornem.; Cathartocarpus javanicus (L.) Pers.

= Cassia javanica =

Species of legume

Cassia javanica, also known as Java cassia, pink shower, apple blossom tree, rainbow shower tree, and Palawan cherry, is a species of tree in the family Fabaceae. Its origin is in Southeast Asia, but it has been extensively grown in tropical areas worldwide as a garden tree owing to its beautiful crimson and pink flower bunches.

== Description ==
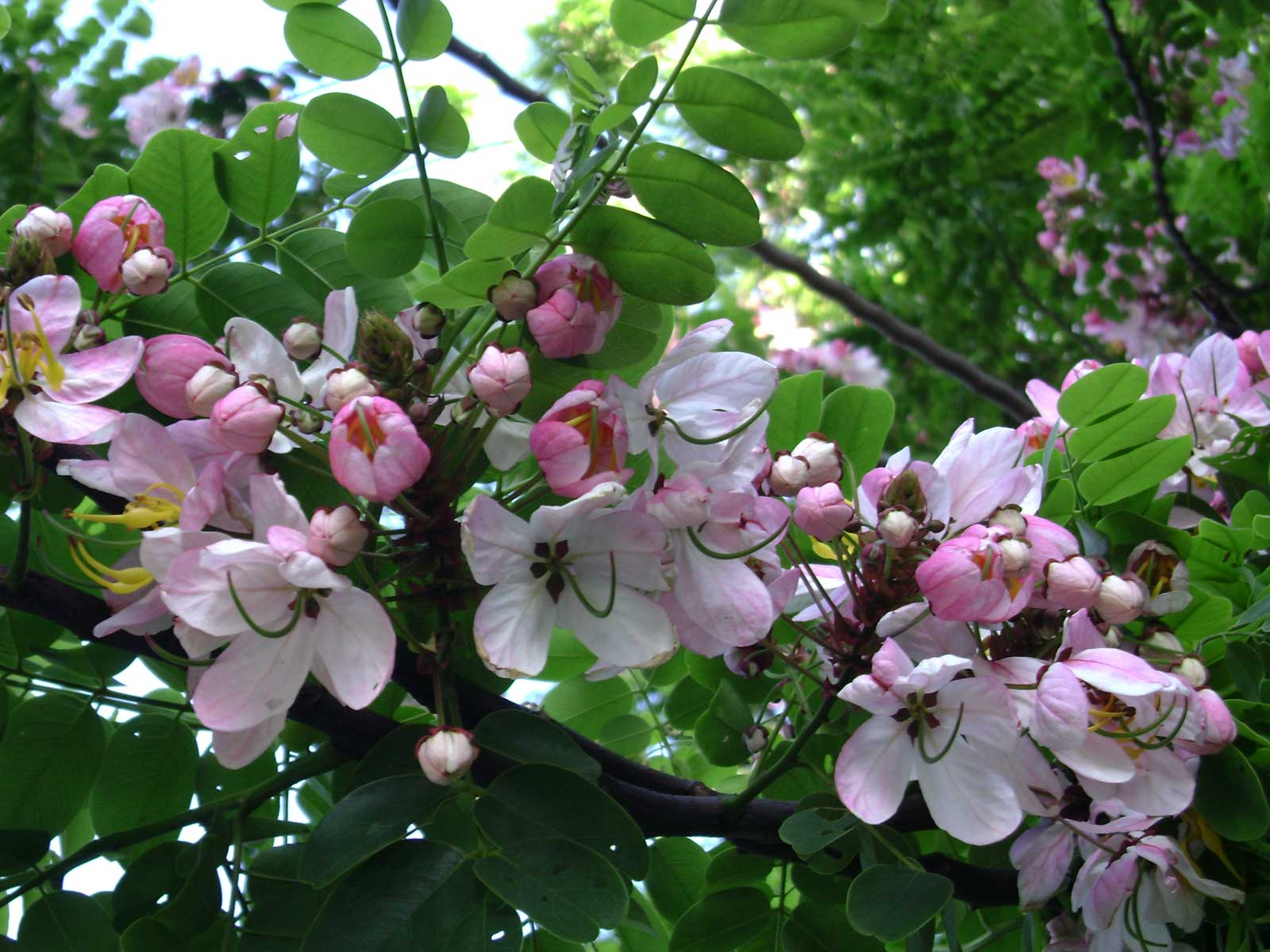
Detail of flowers and leaves

Cassia javanica is a fast growing, deciduous / semi-deciduous tree which flowers in spring and sheds its leaves in the winter months. It has a straight trunk that reaches heights of 25 - 40m. The leaves are paripinnate with 12 pairs of elliptical leaves. The flowers range in colour from pale pink to crimson with yellow coloured stamens and are found in open clusters. The ground under the tree is covered with a beautiful carpet of pink towards the end of the flowering season. The fruit are housed in long cylindrical dark brown pods. Because of its beauty and suitable size C. javanica is planted as a shade and ornamental tree on streets and in parks. C. javanica is polymorphic and several sub species such as those listed below exist.

== Taxonomy ==
Cassia javanica was first described by Carl Linnaeus in 1753, and published in his work Species Plantarum.

=== Subspecies ===
Seven subspecies are recognised by Plants of the World Online as of 8 March 2024, as follows:

- C. j. subsp. agnes (de Wit) K.Larsen – synonyms Cassia agnes (de Wit) Brenan, Cassia javanica var. agnes de Wit, Cassia indochinensis (Gagnep.) V.Singh, Cassia javanica var. indochinensis Gagnep.
- C. j. subsp. bartonii (F.M.Bailey) K.Larsen – synonym Cassia bartonii F.M.Bailey
- C. j. subsp. javanica L.
- C. j. subsp. microcalyx (H.S.Irwin & Barneby) K.Larsen – synonym Cassia javanica var. microcalyx H.S.Irwin & Barneby
- C. j. subsp. nodosa (Buch.-Ham. ex Roxb.) K.Larsen & S.S.Larsen – synonyms Cassia nodosa Buch.-Ham. ex Roxb., Cathartocarpus nodosus (Buch.-Ham. ex Roxb.) Steud.
- C. j. subsp. pubiflora (Merr.) K.Larsen – synonym assia javanica var. pubiflora Merr.
- C. j. subsp. renigera (Wall. ex Benth.) K.Larsen – synonym Cassia renigera Wall. ex Benth.

== Range ==
The natural range of this species is from Assam (far northeastern India), to southern China, south through Malesia and Papuasia, to Queensland (Australia). It has been introduced to other tropical countries and areas, including India, Hawaii, Sri Lanka, tropical America and tropical Africa.

== Flowering season ==
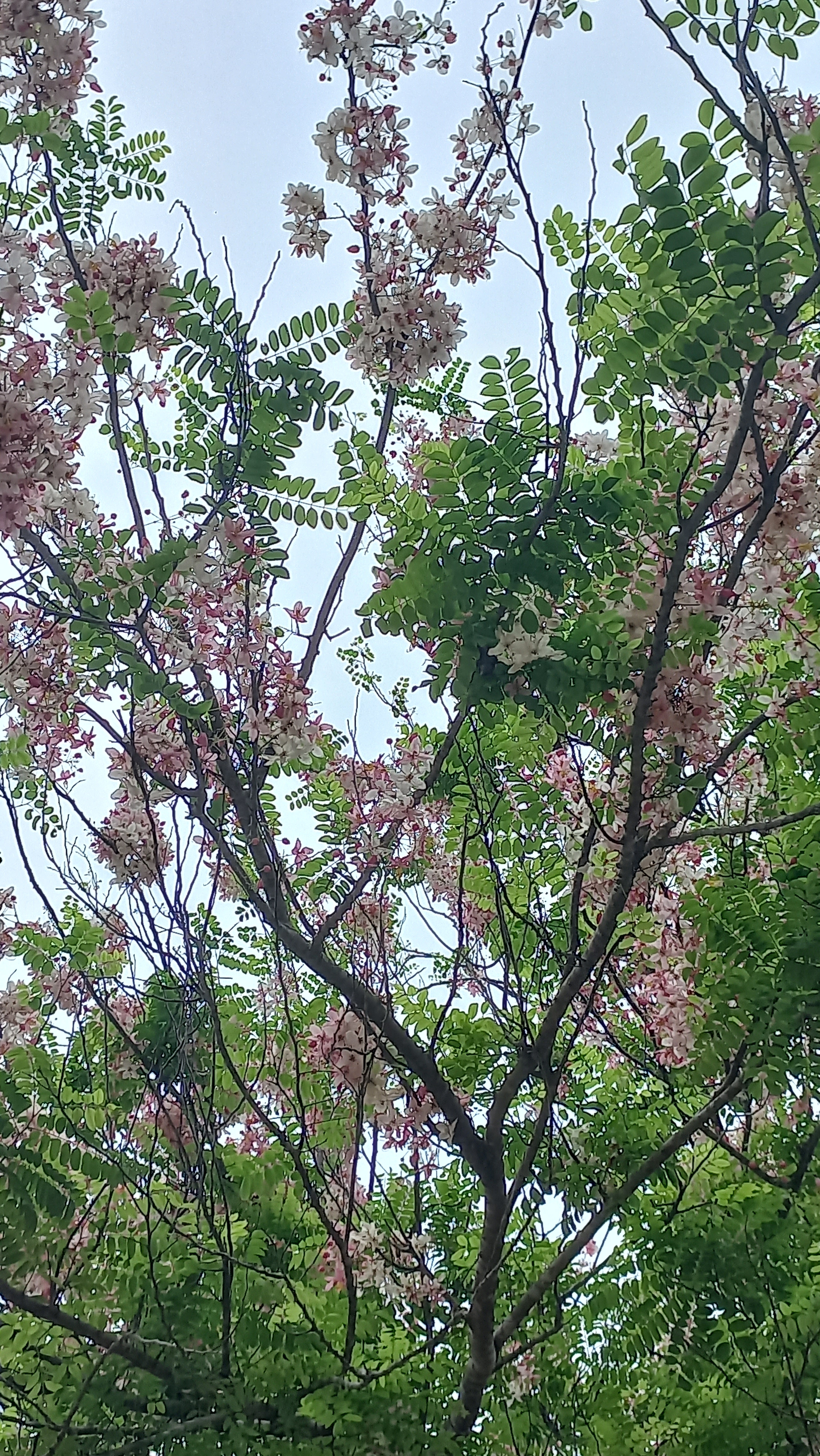
Flowers of a Palawan Cherry tree in Calauit Island

In India, C. javanica flowers in April/May and fruits and sheds its leaves in December. In Thailand, C. javanica flowers between Feb and April. In the Philippines, C. j. nodosa flowers between February until the summer season. In East Java, C. javanica flowers between October and December and fruits in the dry season.

== Cultural importance ==
Cassia javanica is one of Thailand's Nine Auspicious Trees and is said to bring good luck, ensure continued high rank and afford victory. Its flower is the provincial flower of Chainat Province, Thailand.

The subspecies native to the Philippines is subspecies pubiflora, which is found only on Luzon in the provinces of Bataan, Bulacan, Ilocos Sur, Rizal, and Zambales; there also were historical records from Metro Manila. The so-called 'Palawan cherry blossom' is not a native of the Philippines and is composed of Cassia grandis, Cassia nodosa subsp. javanica, Cassia nodosa subsp. nodosa, and at least one hybrid of one of those. Though locally called balayong and honored through the Balayong Festival in Puerto Princesa, Palawan, it is most definitely not a true native of Palawan, having been introduced there as a timber tree. As an introduced tree without a local epithet, the locals needed a name for which to market it. Since the wood- pinkish when cut- is very similar to that of the true balayong or Afzelia rhomboidea, the name was given and has since stuck.

== Uses ==
It is used medicinally as a substitute to Cassia fistula for treating constipation, colic, chlorosis and urinary disorders. Its leaves are effective against herpes simplex and the bark of C. javanica is one of the ingredients in ayurvedic and other traditional medicine antidiabetic formulations. C. javanica yields a lightweight to heavy hardwood that is used for general construction, furniture and cabinet making. The bark of C. javanica is used for tanning in the leather processing industry.
