= Bean tree =

Bean tree is a name used in different parts of the world for various trees that carry their seeds in large pods. Examples include:

- Carob
- Catalpa
- Cassia brewsteri
- Cassia tomentella
- Erythrina
- Castanospermum australe
- Lysiphyllum carronii
