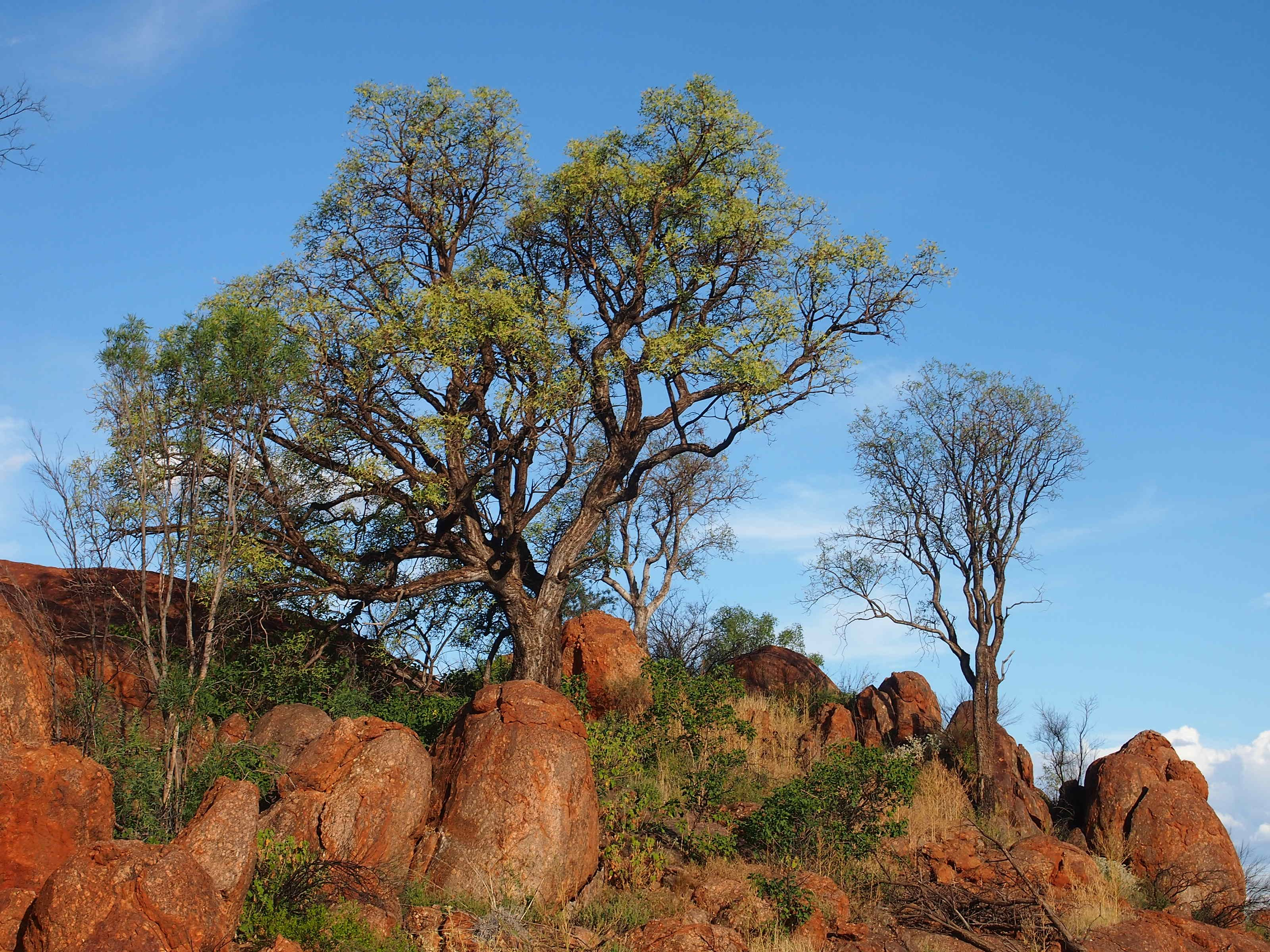

Scientific classification
- Kingdom: Plantae
- Clade: Tracheophytes
- Clade: Angiosperms
- Clade: Eudicots
- Clade: Rosids
- Order: Fabales
- Family: Fabaceae
- Subfamily: Faboideae
- Genus: Erythrina
- Species: E. vespertilio

Binomial name
- Erythrina vespertilio Benth.

= Erythrina vespertilio =

Species of plant

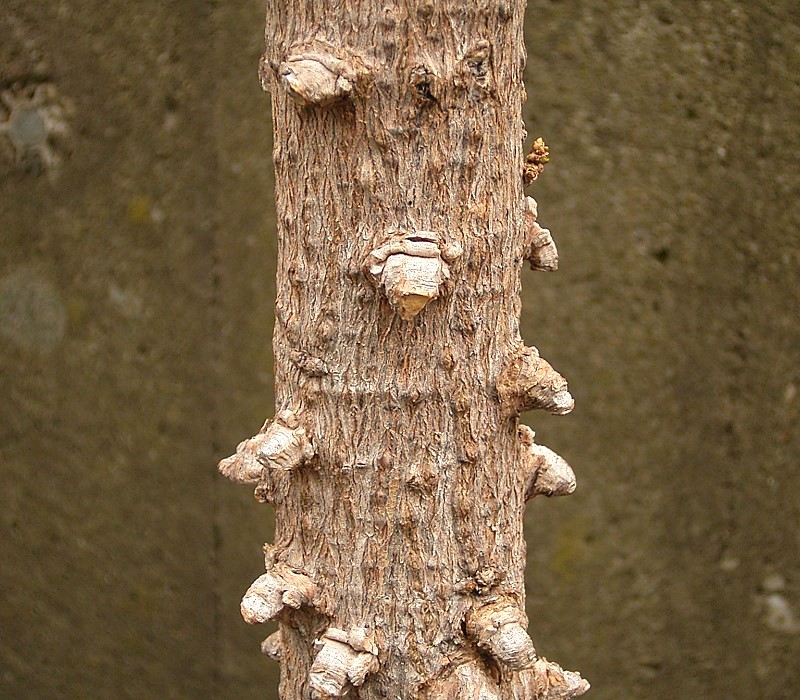
E. vespertilio bark.

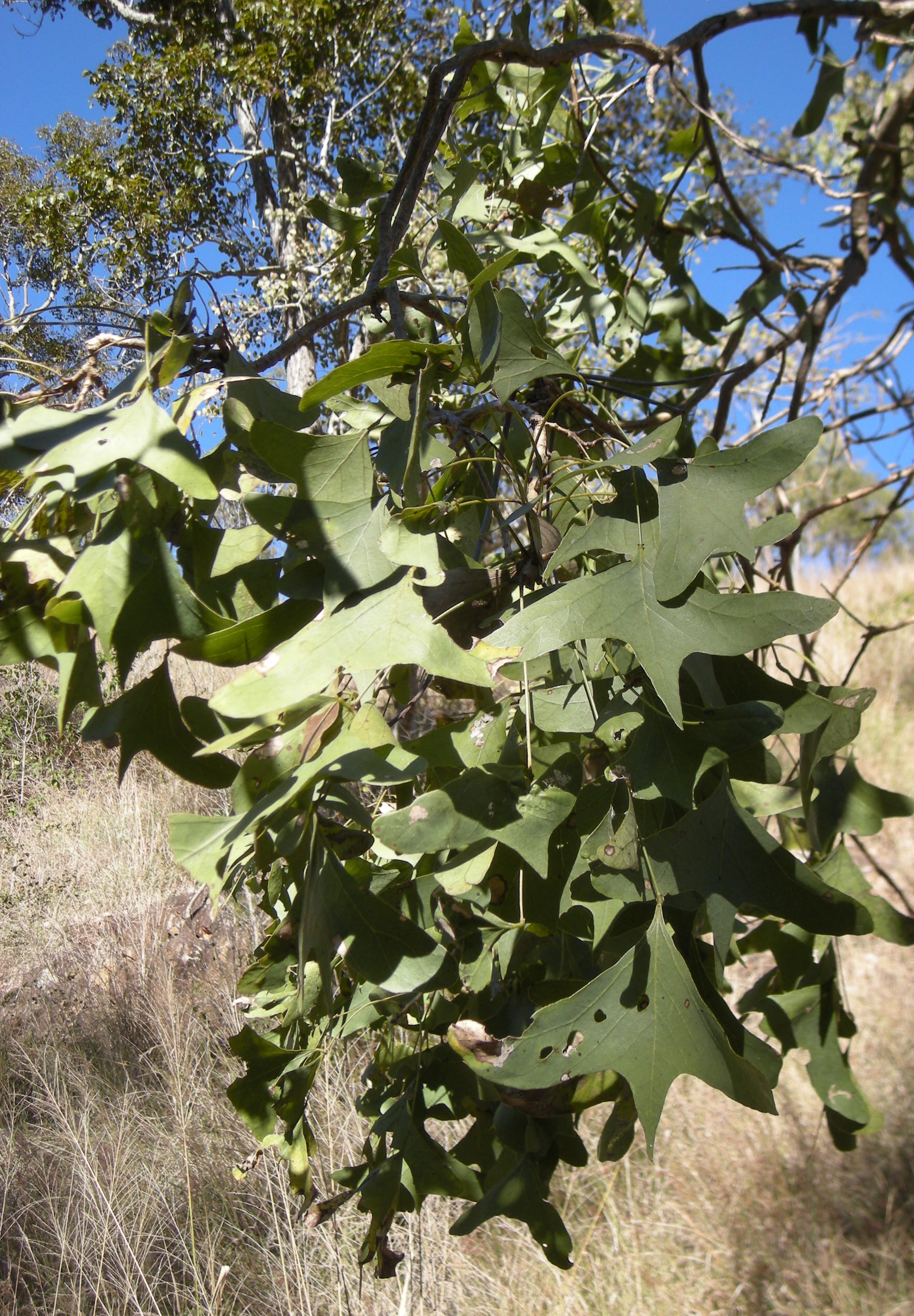
E. vespertilio foliage.

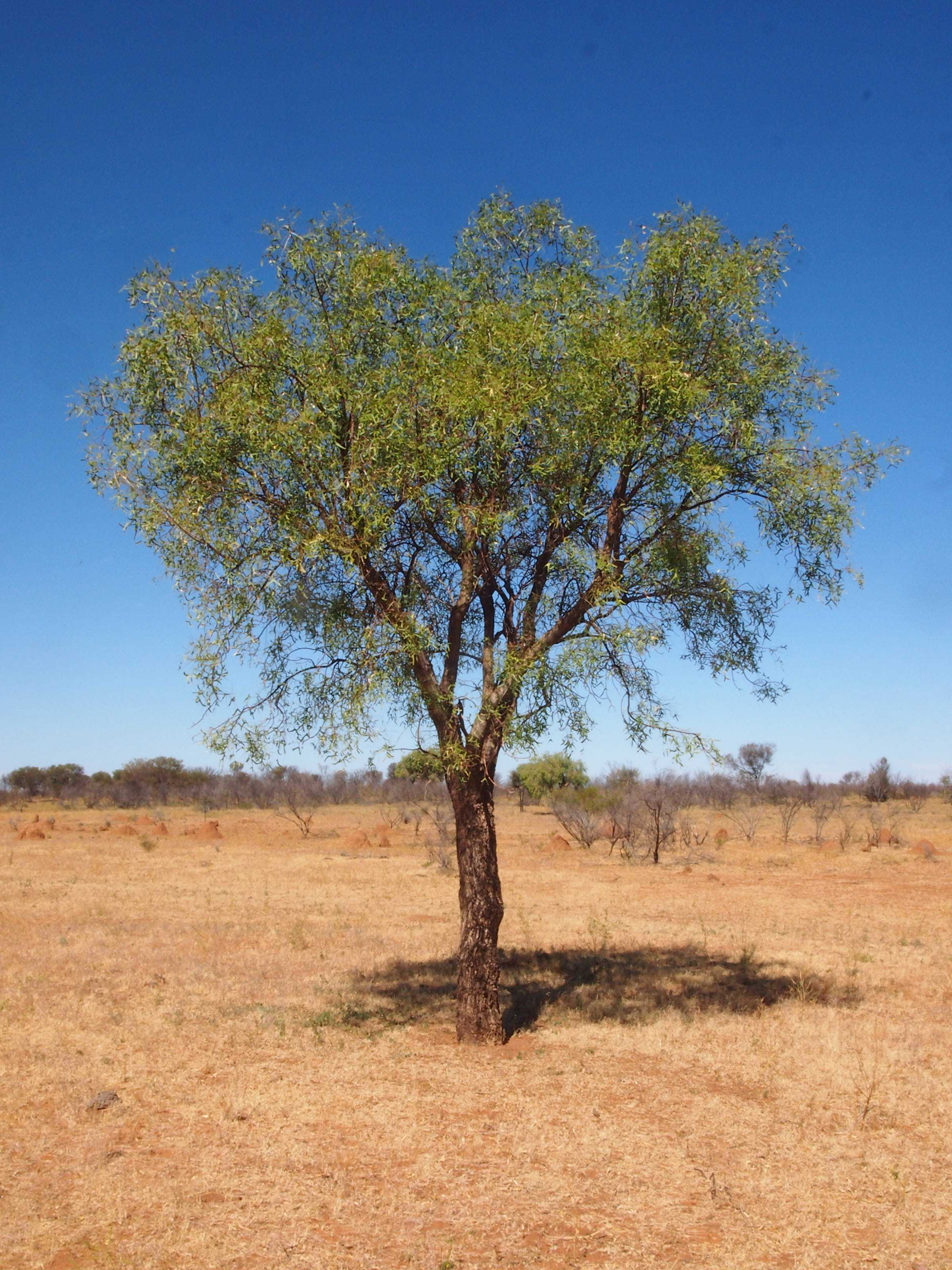
Erythrina vespertilio habit

Erythrina vespertilio is a tree native to north and north-east Australia. Its common names are grey corkwood, bat's wing coral tree, yulbah and the more ambiguous "bean tree". In the Western Desert language it is known as ininti and in Arrernte and Anmatyerr it is known as atywerety.

== Description ==
The small tree has a straggly habit and typically grows to a height of 6 to 10 metres (20 to 33 ft). The trunk has a diameter of approximately 0.3 m (1.0 ft). It has thorns on the trunk and branches with bark that is deeply furrowed and corky and creamy-grey in colour.

The leaves are bifoliolate or trifoliolate and are 10 to 15 centimetres (4 to 6 in) long. The leaflets have a broad wedge-shape with three lobes, resembling a bat's open wings. The leaflets are 7 to 12 cm (2.8 to 4.7 in) long and 5 to 12 cm (2.0 to 4.7 in) wide. The species is deciduous in the dry season.

The tree blooms between August and September producing scarlet to orange-red pea flowers that are 3 to 4 cm (1.2 to 1.6 in) long are found on terminal racemes 5 to 25 cm (2.0 to 9.8 in) in length. The flowers have a calyx that is 1.5 to 2.5 cm (0.59 to 0.98 in) long and petals that are about 3 cm (1.18 in) long. There are usually ten stamens. Flowering usually occurs when the tree is leafless.

The seeds resemble beans and are orange to dark yellow in colour with a length of about 1.2 cm (0.47 in) found in pods that are 6 to 12 cm (2.4 to 4.7 in) long and 1.5 to 1.8 cm (0.59 to 0.71 in) wide.

== Distribution ==
E. vespertilio is found on all mainland states except Victoria, mainly in open woodlands but extends to arid areas and rainforest margins. It is found in the Kimberley, Pilbara and northern Goldfields-Esperance regions of Western Australia, throughout most of the Northern Territory and Queensland, northern South Australia and north eastern New South Wales. It found in an altitudinal range from near sea level to 800 metres (2,625 ft). It grows in a wide range of soils as long as drainage is good and it has a position in full sun.

== Classification ==
The species was first formally described by the botanist George Bentham in 1848 as part of Thomas Mitchell's work Journal of an Expedition into the Interior of Tropical Australia.

There are two synonyms Corallodendron vespertilio and Erythrina biloba, and the name of this species is often misapplied to Erythrina numerosa.

There are two known subspecies:

- Erythrina vespertilio subsp. biloba F.Muell. & A.R.Bean
- Erythrina vespertilio subsp. vespertilio

== Uses ==
It was widely traditionally used by Aboriginal Australians in Central Australia for making woomeras and coolamons. The Warlpiri, Anmatyerr, Arrernte and Alyawarr, use the wood to make shields, used either for warfare or ceremonially. These shields could then be used for making fire with the friction method.

The bark is also considered to have traditional medicinal uses. The fruit contains alkaloids and the stem contains isoflavonoids. Phaseollidin (a flavonoid) showed cytotoxic activities in vitro against prostate cancer cell lines at high doses.

The seeds are used to make decorations.
