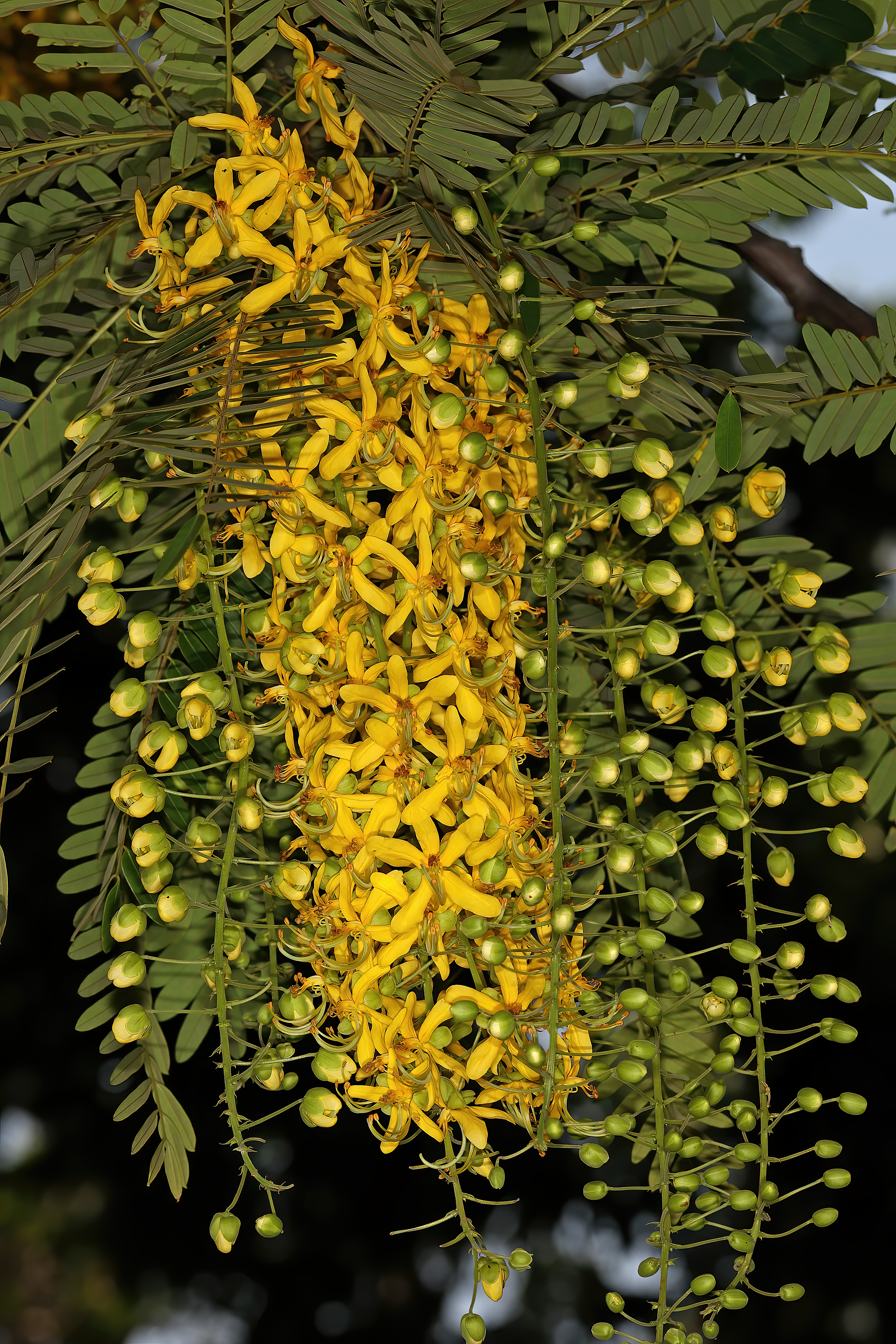
- Flowers and flower buds
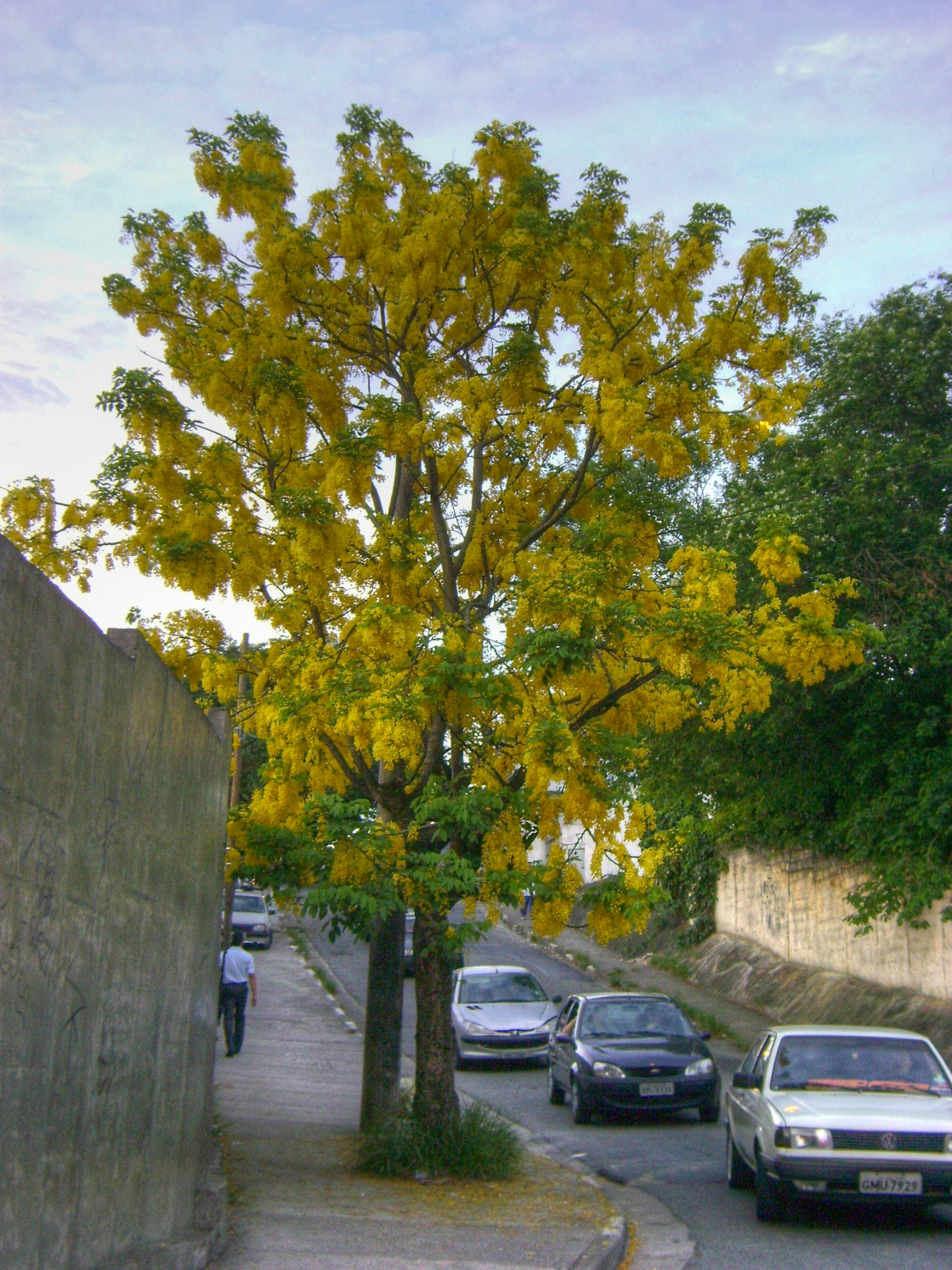
- In São Paulo (by RicardoSAPO)

Scientific classification
- Kingdom: Plantae
- Clade: Embryophytes
- Clade: Tracheophytes
- Clade: Spermatophytes
- Clade: Angiosperms
- Clade: Eudicots
- Clade: Rosids
- Order: Fabales
- Family: Fabaceae
- Subfamily: Caesalpinioideae
- Genus: Cassia
- Species: C. ferruginea

Binomial name
- Cassia ferruginea (Schrad.) DC.

Synonyms
- List: Bactyrilobium ferrugineum Schrad.; Cassia brasiliana Saldanha; Cassia brasiliana var. ferruginea (Schrad.) Vogel; Cassia javanica Vell.; Cassia staminea Vogel; Cathartocarpus ferrugineus (Schrad.) G.Don

= Cassia ferruginea =

Species of flowering plant

Cassia ferruginea is a species of flowering plant in the family Fabaceae, native to Brazil. It is used as a street tree in a number of Brazilian cities.

== Subtaxa ==
The following varieties are accepted:

- Cassia ferruginea var. ferruginea – Brazil
- Cassia ferruginea var. vellozoana H.S.Irwin & Barneby – southern Brazil
