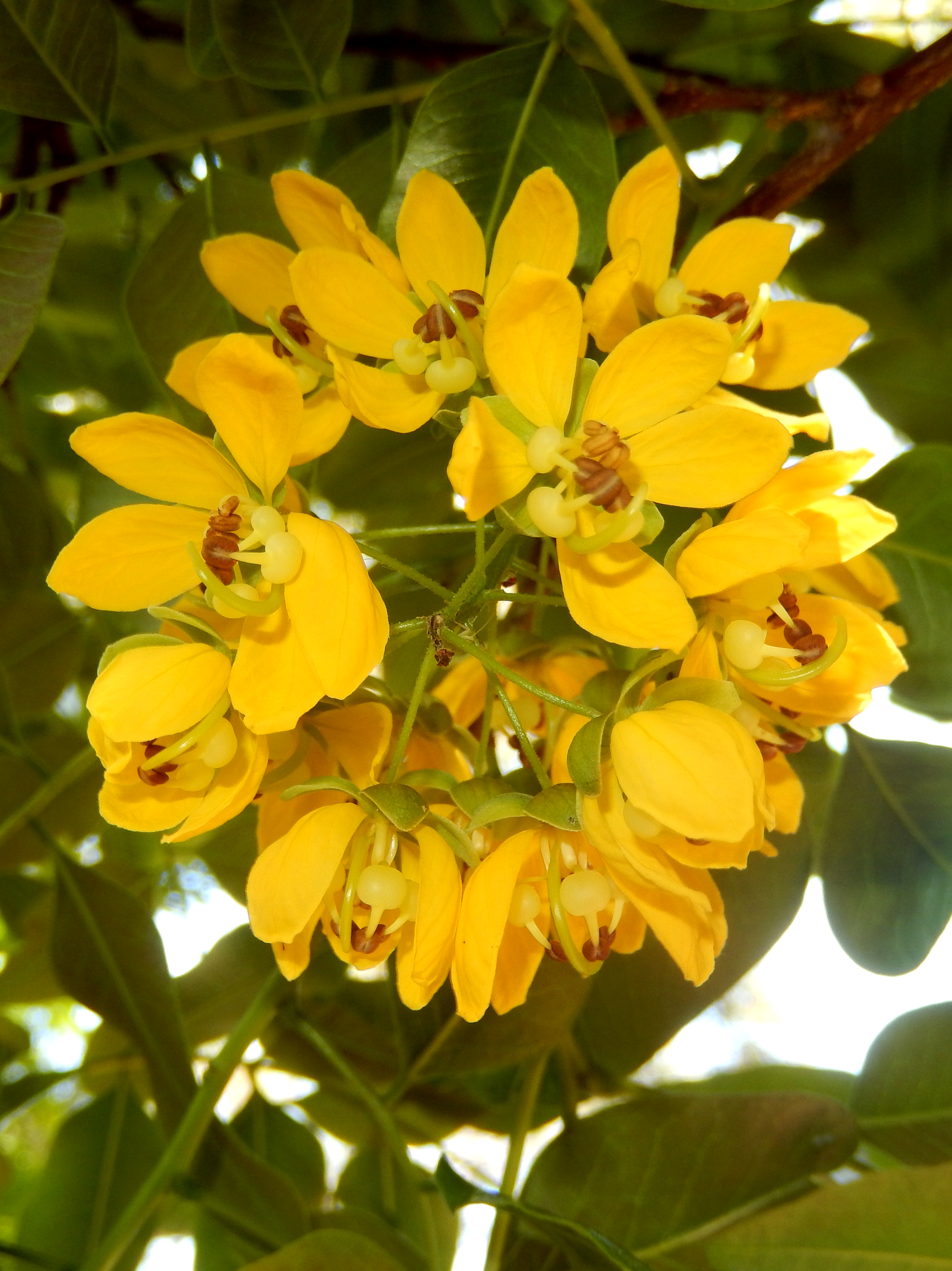

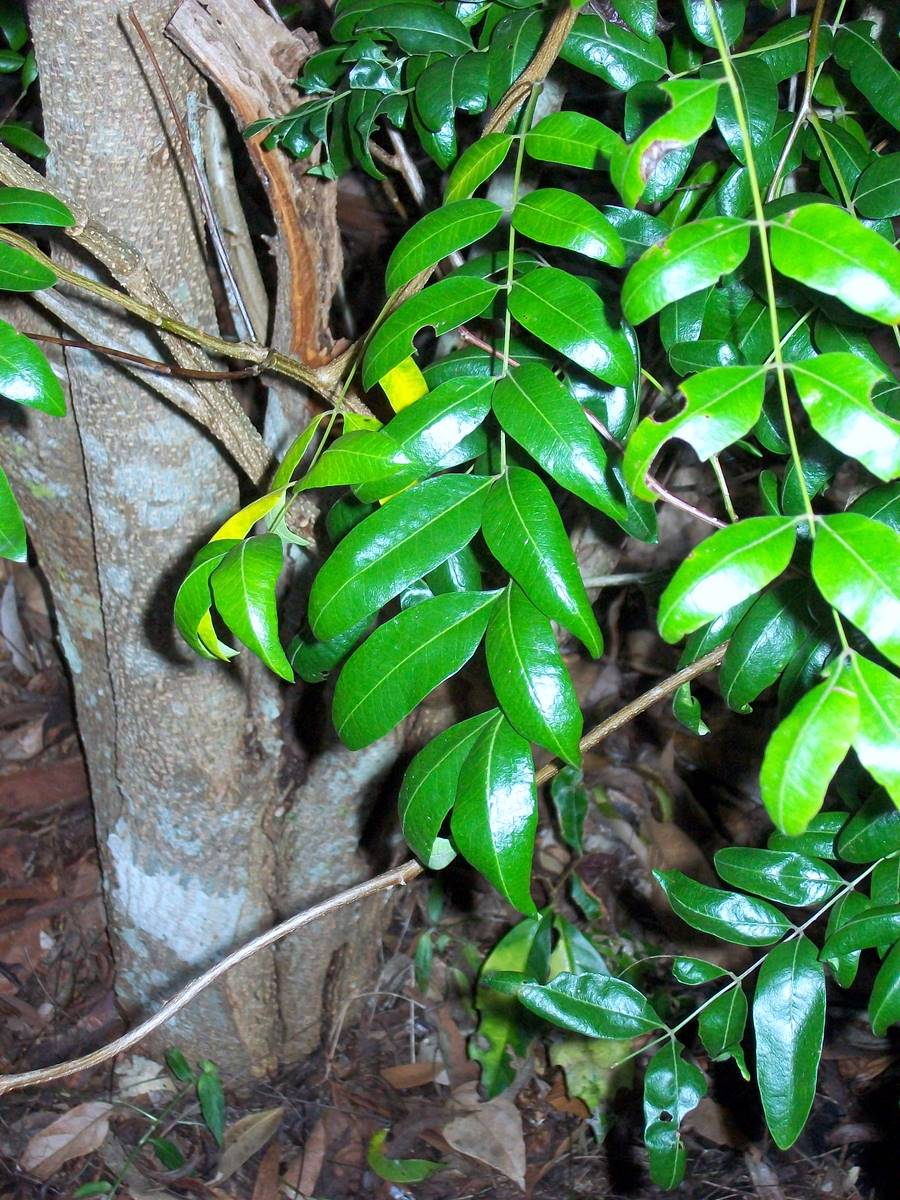

Conservation status
- Endangered (EPBC Act)

Scientific classification
- Kingdom: Plantae
- Clade: Tracheophytes
- Clade: Angiosperms
- Clade: Eudicots
- Clade: Rosids
- Order: Fabales
- Family: Fabaceae
- Subfamily: Caesalpinioideae
- Genus: Cassia
- Species: C. marksiana

Binomial name
- Cassia marksiana (F.M.Bailey) Domin

Synonyms
- Cassia brewsteri var. marksiana (F.Muell.) F.Muell. ex Benth.

= Cassia marksiana =

Species of legume

Cassia marksiana, or Marks cassia, is an Australian rainforest tree growing in far northeastern New South Wales and in southeastern Queensland. The common name is in honour of Dr. C. F. Marks, an early botanical collector. Other common names include cigar cassia, brush cassia, and native laburnum. The Brunswick River is considered the southernmost point of natural distribution.

Its habitat is seaside and lowland subtropical rainforest, which is almost completely destroyed, with only small remnant patches remaining. Less than 100 trees are known to exist in the wild in some 20 locations. Consequently, it is listed as endangered.

== Description ==
It is a small to medium-sized tree, up to 25 m tall and a stem diameter of 50 cm. The trunk is not buttressed, with grey-brown wrinkled bark. Compound leaves are alternate on the stem, with four to 16 leaflets, 2.5 to 7.5 cm long, usually opposite the leaf stem. Leaflets vary in shape, mostly lanceolate or ovate-lanceolate and broader. Leaf veins are easily noticed.

Showy and attractive yellow flowers form on racemes from September to November. A long, thin pod matures from June to October, 30 cm long and 2 cm in diameter.
