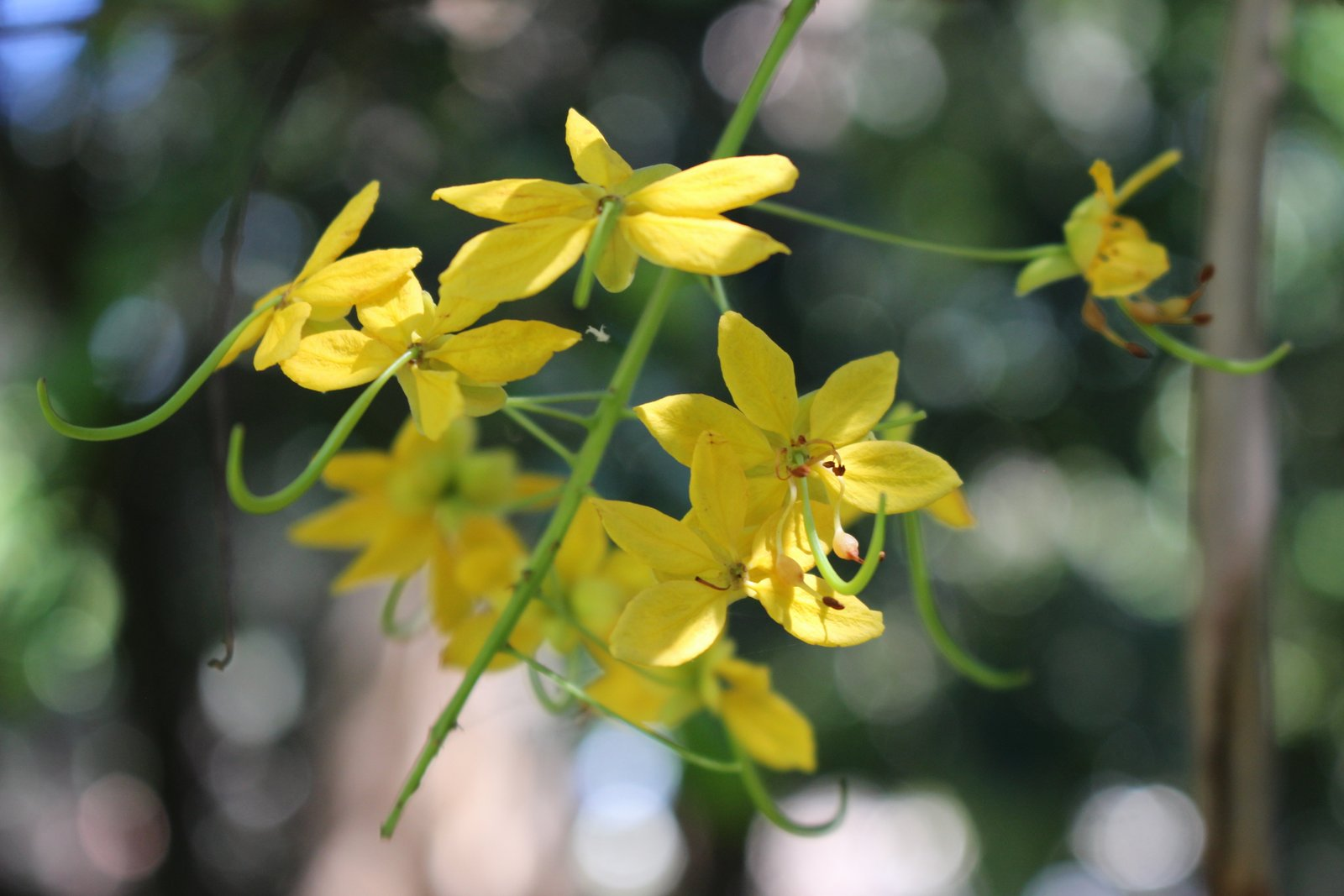

Scientific classification
- Kingdom: Plantae
- Clade: Tracheophytes
- Clade: Angiosperms
- Clade: Eudicots
- Clade: Rosids
- Order: Fabales
- Family: Fabaceae
- Subfamily: Caesalpinioideae
- Genus: Cassia
- Species: C. queenslandica

Binomial name
- Cassia queenslandica C.T.White

Synonyms
- Cassia brewsteri var. sylvestris F.M.Bailey

= Cassia queenslandica =

Yellow shower

Species of legume

Cassia queenslandica, the yellow shower, is a species of plant in the family Fabaceae. It is found only in Queensland, Australia. The attractive yellow flowers offer horticultural potential for this species.
