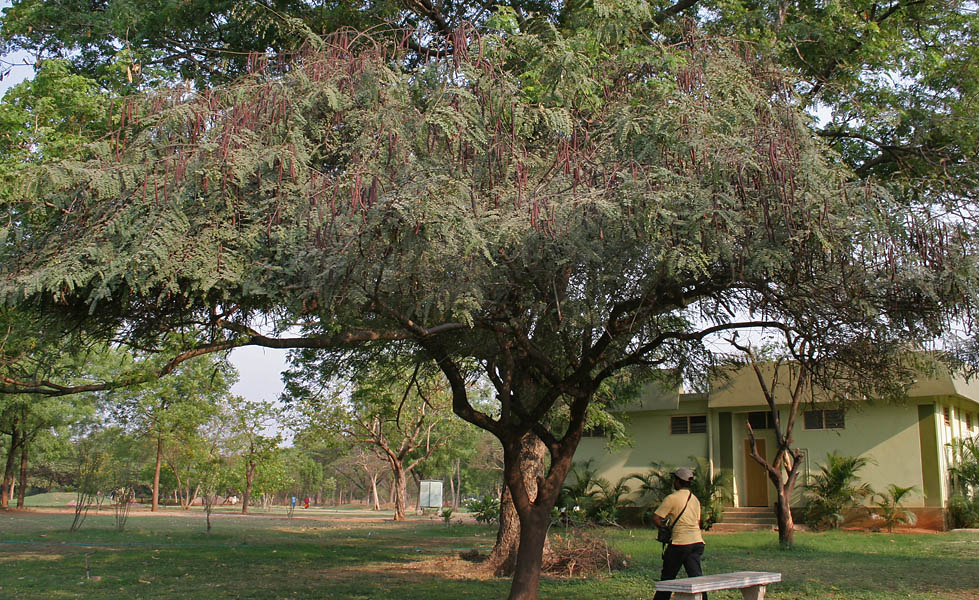
- Tree in non-flowering stage

Scientific classification
- Kingdom: Plantae
- Clade: Embryophytes
- Clade: Tracheophytes
- Clade: Spermatophytes
- Clade: Angiosperms
- Clade: Eudicots
- Clade: Rosids
- Order: Fabales
- Family: Fabaceae
- Subfamily: Caesalpinioideae
- Genus: Cassia
- Species: C. roxburghii

Binomial name
- Cassia roxburghii DC.

Synonyms
- Cassia javanica sensu Bojer; Cassia marginata Roxb.; Cathartocarpus marginatus G.Don; Cathartocarpus roxburghii (DC.) Loudon

= Cassia roxburghii =

Species of legume

Cassia roxburghii, the red cassia, Roxburgh's cassia or Ceylon senna, is a flowering plant in the family Fabaceae. The species is native to the Indian subcontinent and adjacent regions of Southeast Asia. It ranges throughout South India and Sri Lanka.

The Latin specific epithet roxburghii refers to the Scottish Botanist William Roxburgh.

== Description ==
The red cassia is a medium-sized tree, growing to 15–20 m (49–66 ft) tall with spreading, drooping branches. The leaves are clusters of pink, rose or orange flowers, 15–60 cm (5.9–23.6 in) long, and pinnate with three to eight pairs of leaflets, each leaflet 7–21 cm (2.8–8.3 in) long and 4–9 cm (1.6–3.5 in) broad. The flowers are produced in pendulous racemes 20–40 cm (7.9–15.7 in) long, each flower 4–7 cm (1.6–2.8 in) diameter with red to pinkish petals. The fruit is a legume.

== Gallery ==
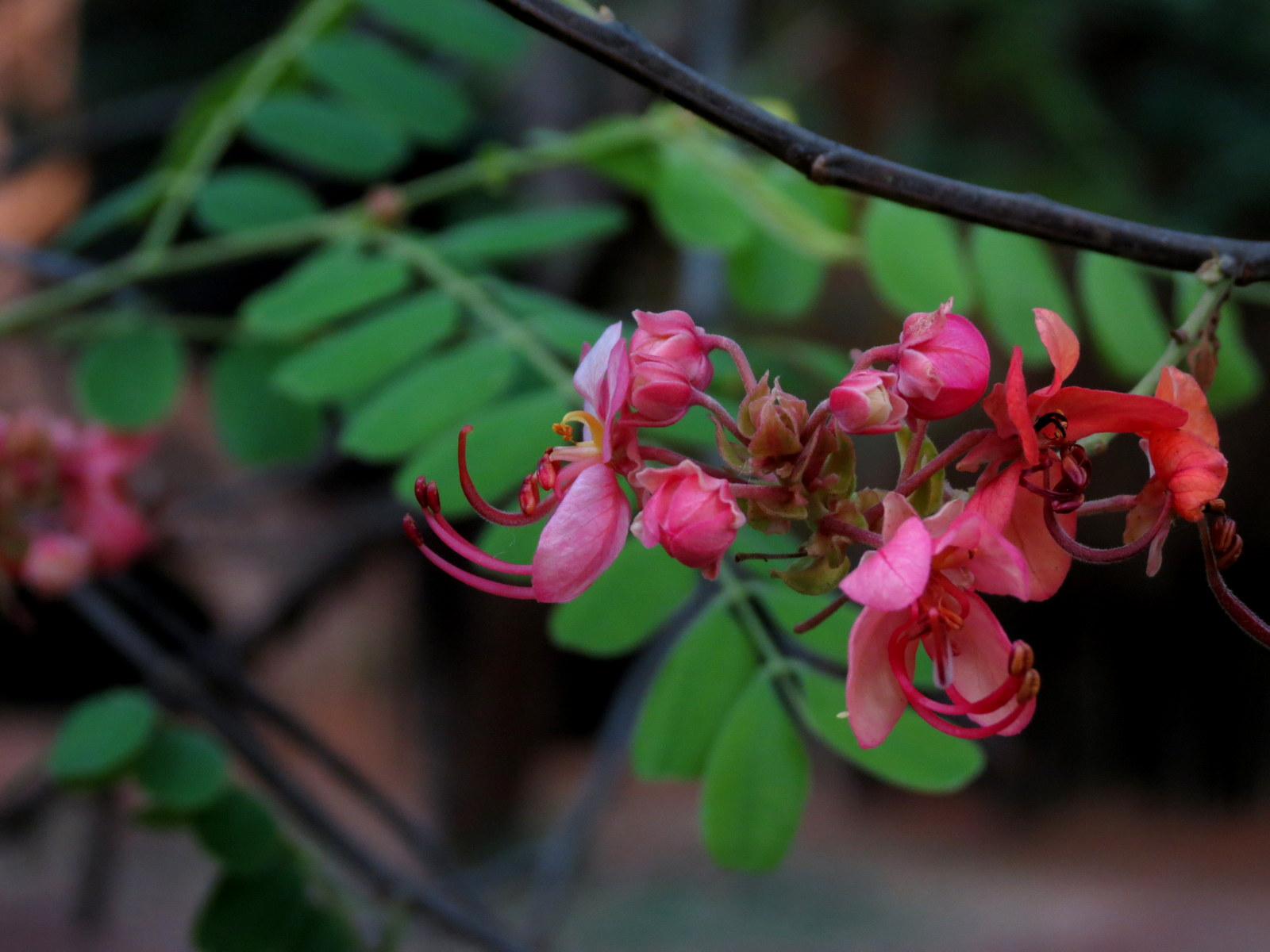
Flowers

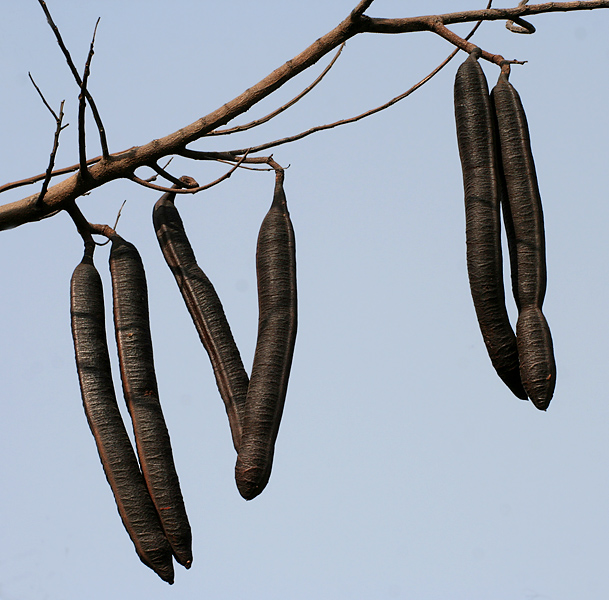
Fruit pods

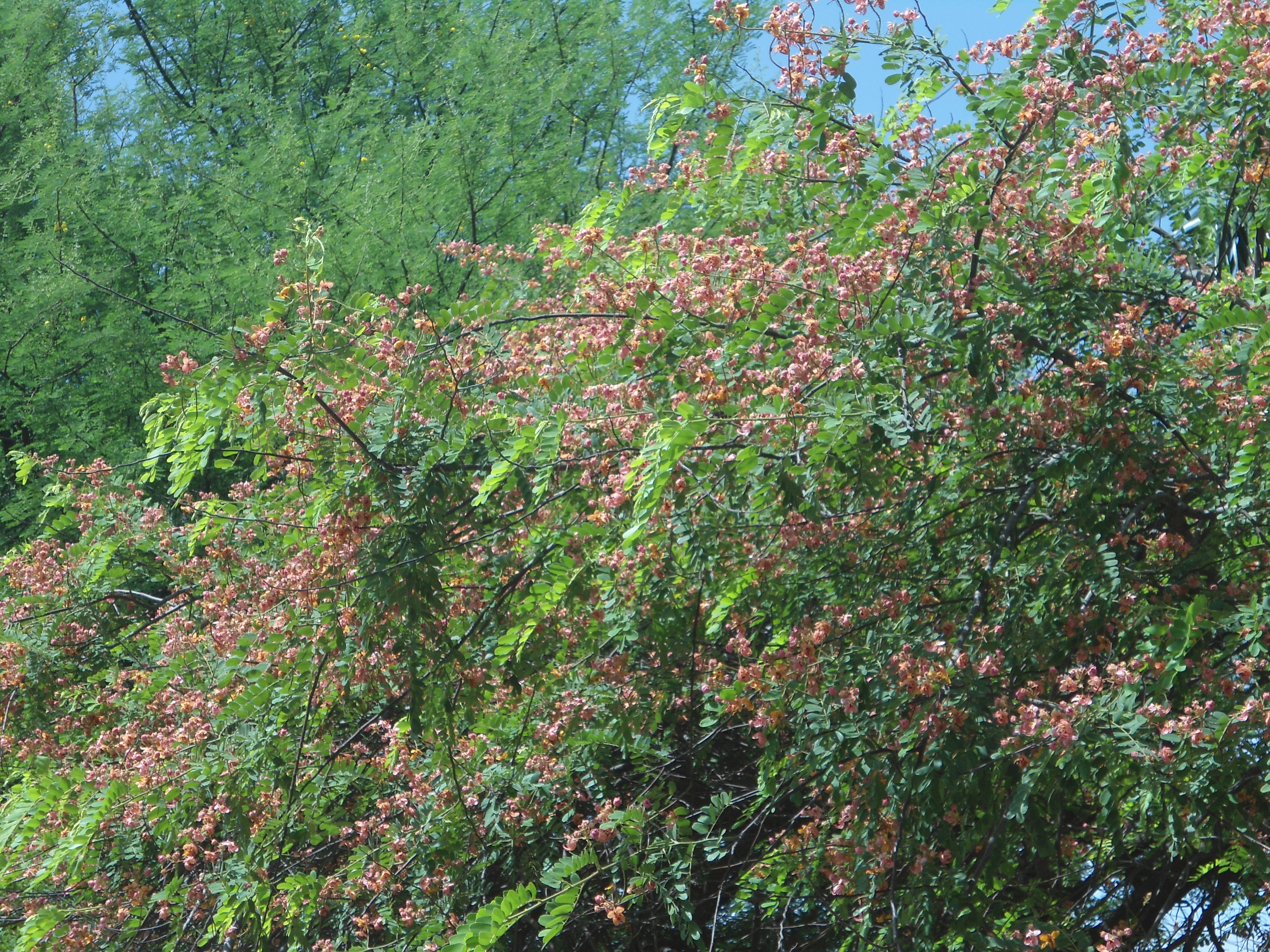
Flowering season

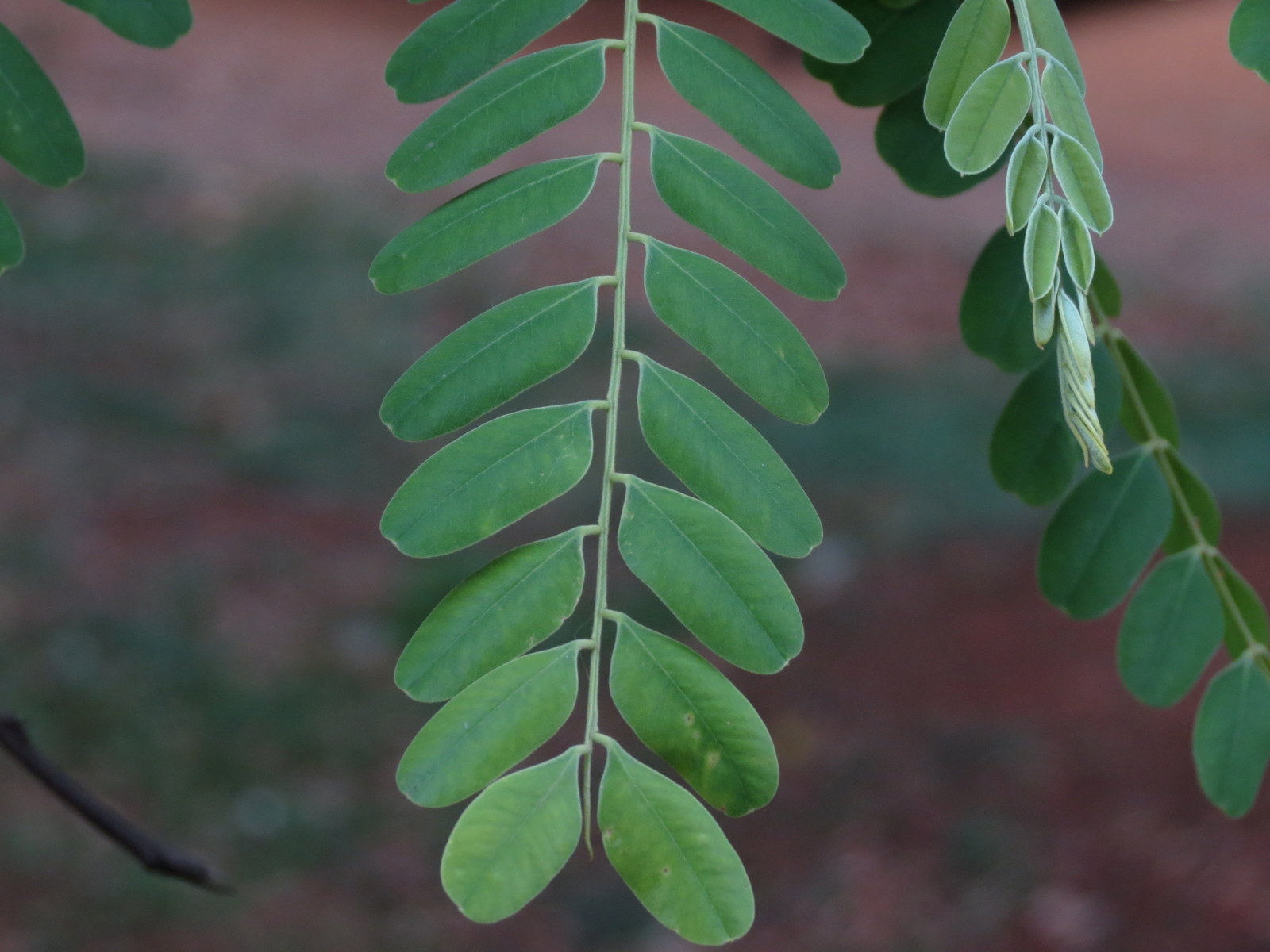
Leaves

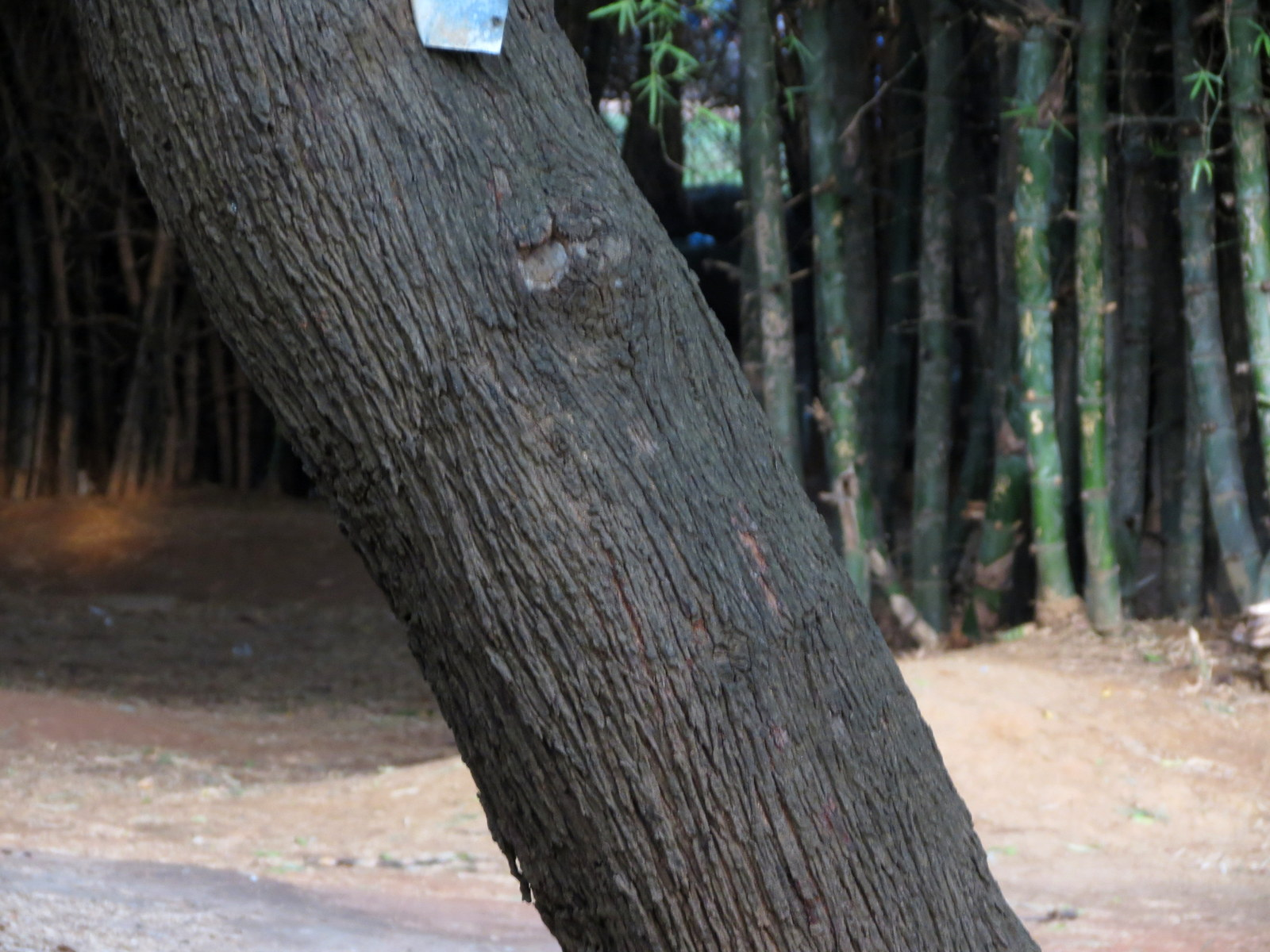
Stem
