= Cassia artensis =

Conservation status
- Endangered (IUCN 2.3)

Scientific classification
- Kingdom: Plantae
- Clade: Tracheophytes
- Clade: Angiosperms
- Clade: Eudicots
- Clade: Rosids
- Order: Fabales
- Family: Fabaceae
- Subfamily: Caesalpinioideae
- Genus: Cassia
- Species: C. artensis

Binomial name
- Cassia artensis (Montr.) Beauv.

Species of legume

Cassia artensis is a species of plant in the family Fabaceae. It is found only in New Caledonia.
