= Cassia aubrevillei =

Conservation status
- Vulnerable (IUCN 2.3)

Scientific classification
- Kingdom: Plantae
- Clade: Tracheophytes
- Clade: Angiosperms
- Clade: Eudicots
- Clade: Rosids
- Order: Fabales
- Family: Fabaceae
- Subfamily: Caesalpinioideae
- Genus: Cassia
- Species: C. aubrevillei

Binomial name
- Cassia aubrevillei Pellegr.

Synonyms
- Cassia sp. aff. mannii Aubrev.

Species of legume

Cassia aubrevillei is a plant species in the family Fabaceae. A forest tree of tropical West Africa, it is threatened by deforestation and unsustainable logging for timber. The bark of the tree has been investigated for antifilarial properties.
