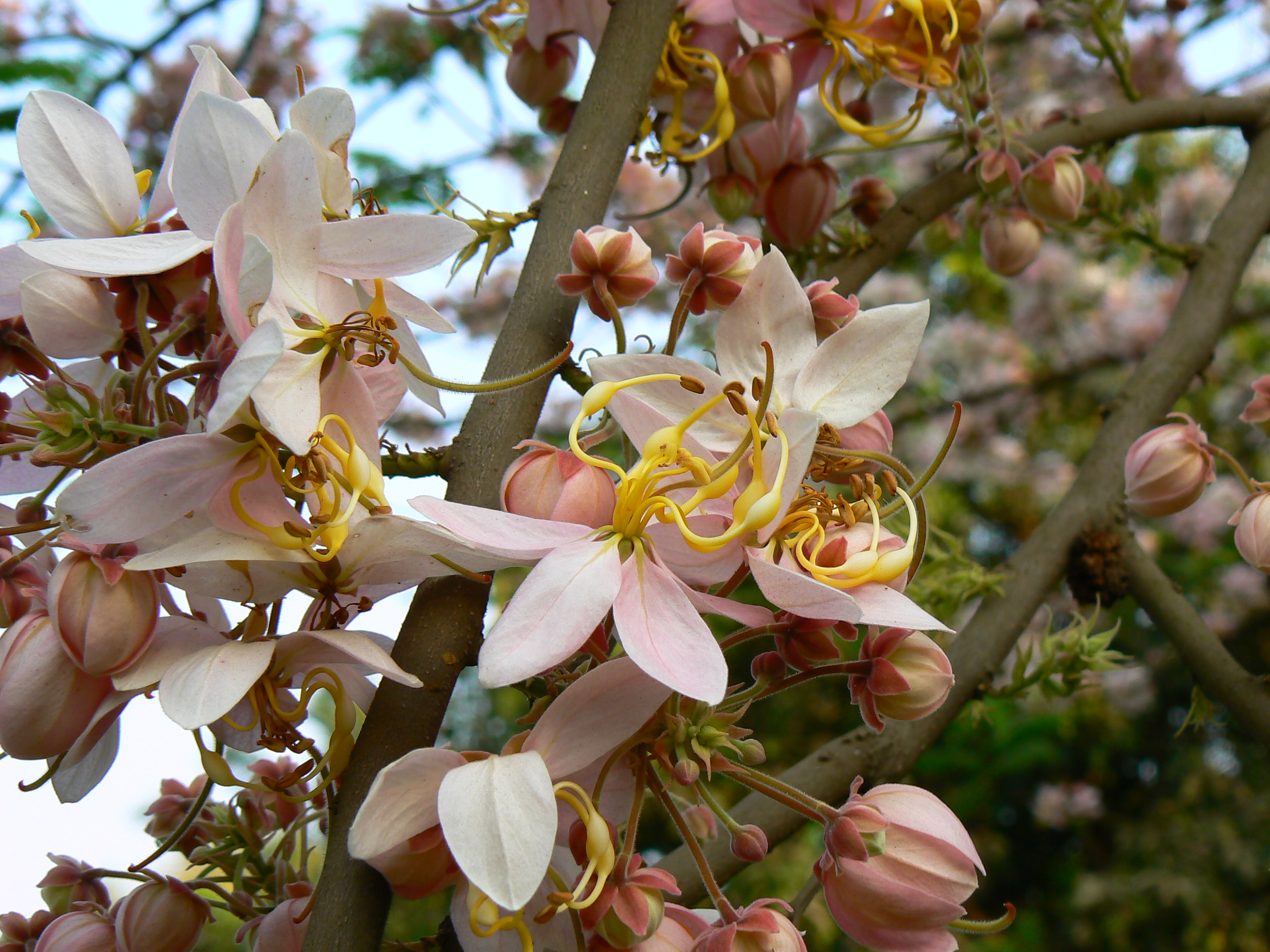

Scientific classification
- Kingdom: Plantae
- Clade: Tracheophytes
- Clade: Angiosperms
- Clade: Eudicots
- Clade: Rosids
- Order: Fabales
- Family: Fabaceae
- Subfamily: Caesalpinioideae
- Genus: Cassia
- Species: C. bakeriana

Binomial name
- Cassia bakeriana Craib

Synonyms
- Cassia bakerana Craib

= Cassia bakeriana =

Species of plant

Cassia bakeriana, also commonly known as the pink shower tree, wishing tree, and dwarf apple blossom tree. It is a flowering plant in the subfamily, Caesalpinioideae of the legume family, Fabaceae. It is a broadleaf evergreen tree growing up to 30 feet (9.1 metres). It is native to Myanmar and Thailand. The pink shower tree is mostly grown as an ornamental and it has showy, fragrant flowers that are pink-purple in color.

== Gallery ==
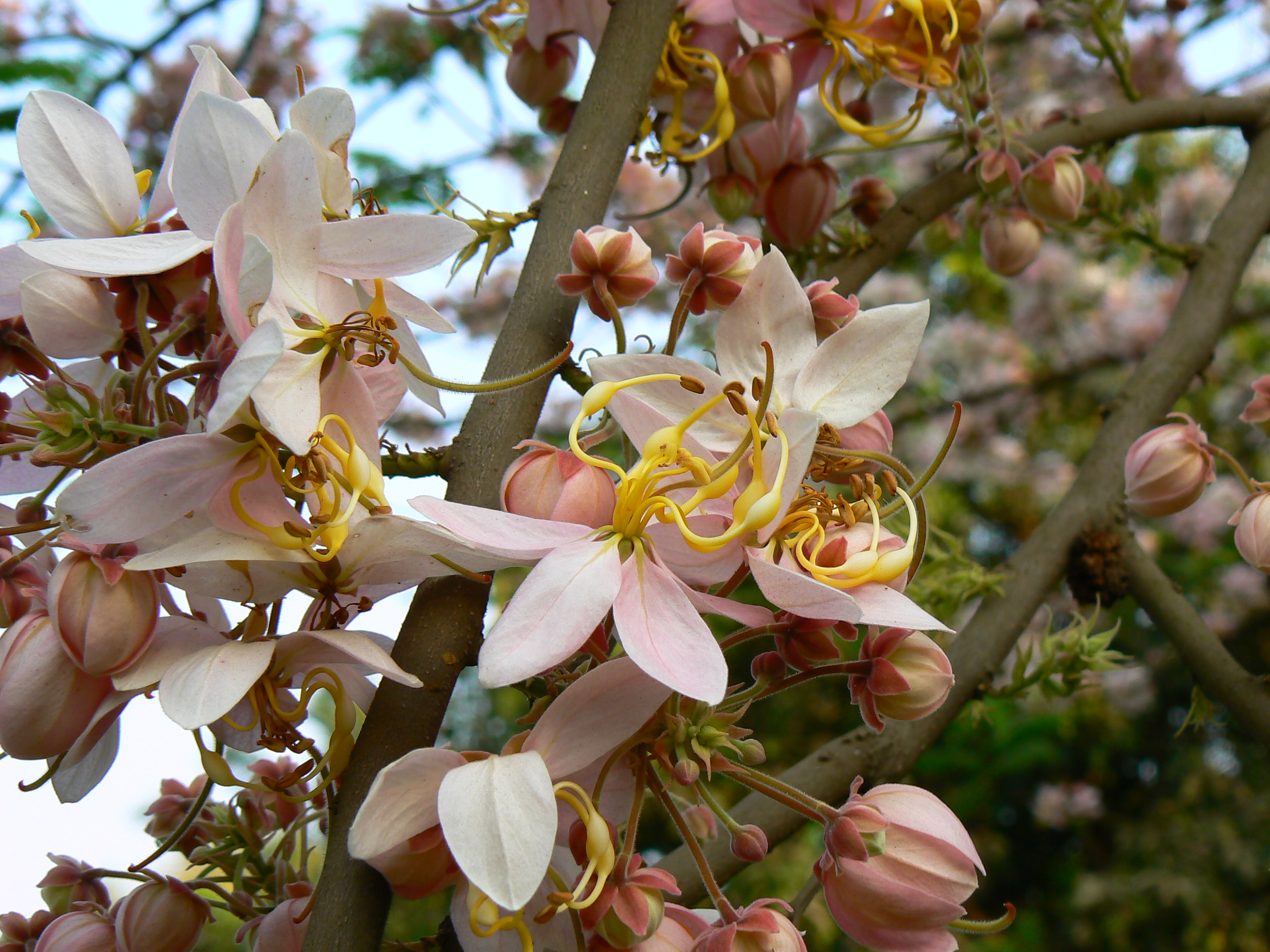

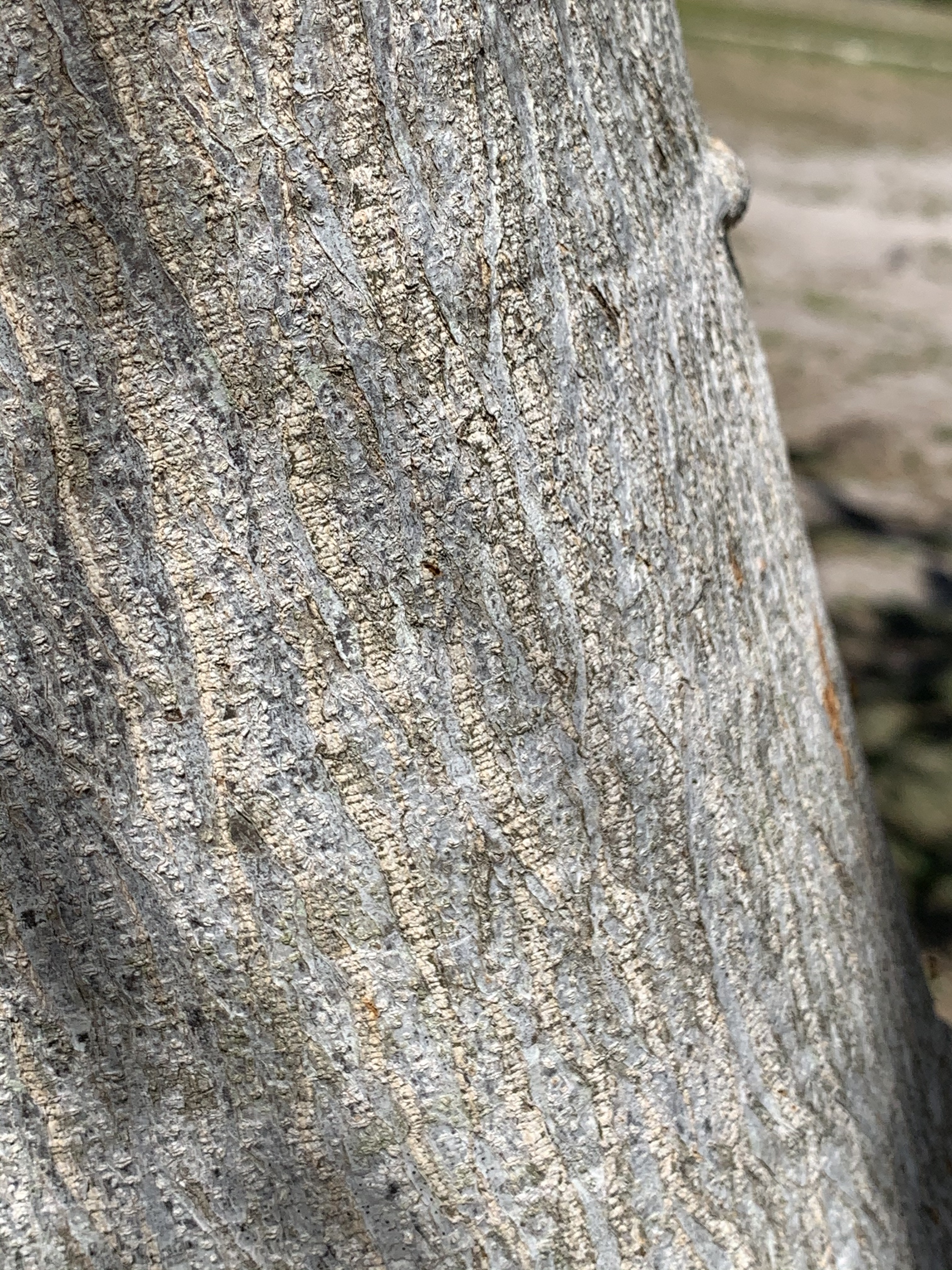

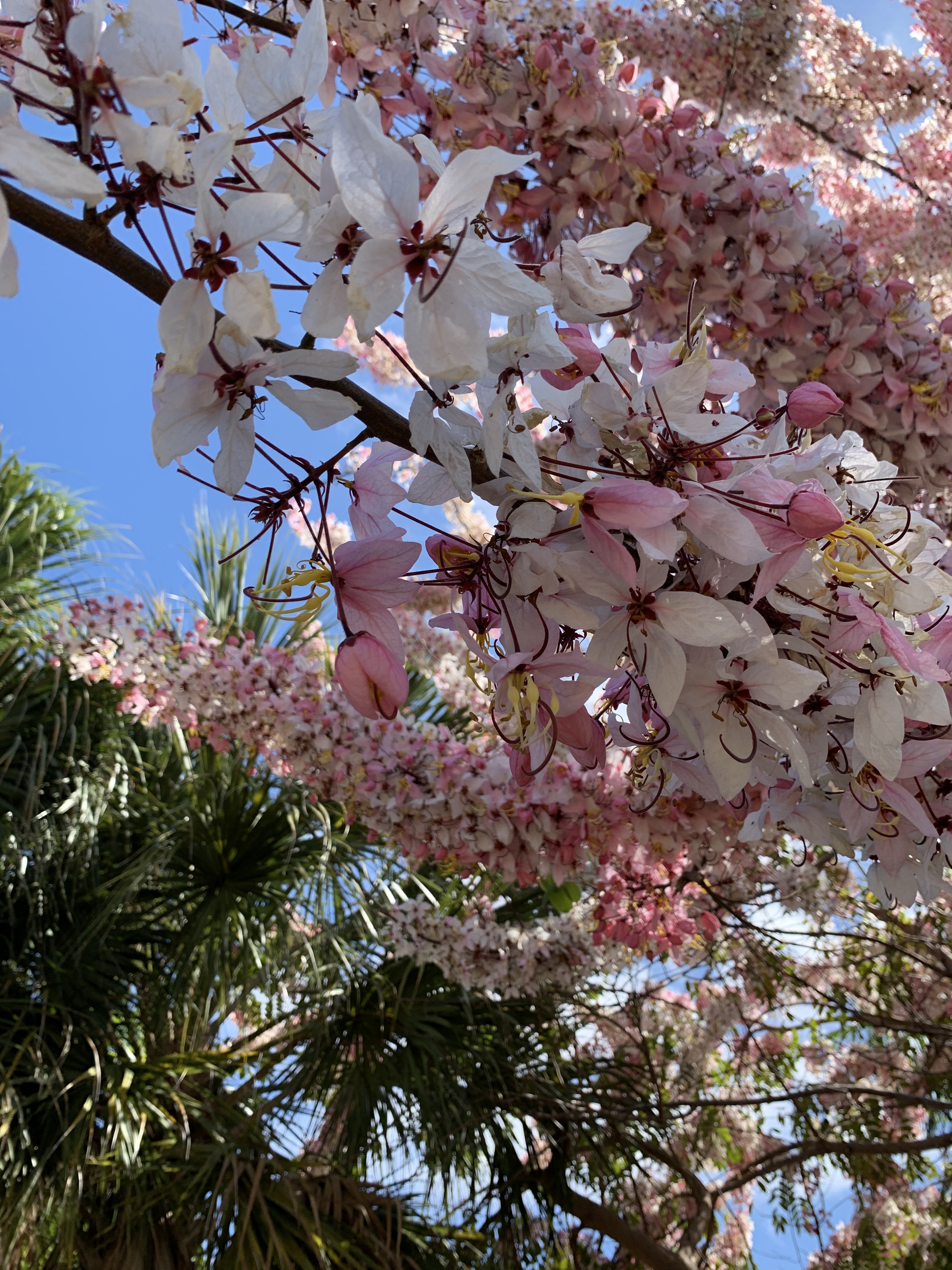

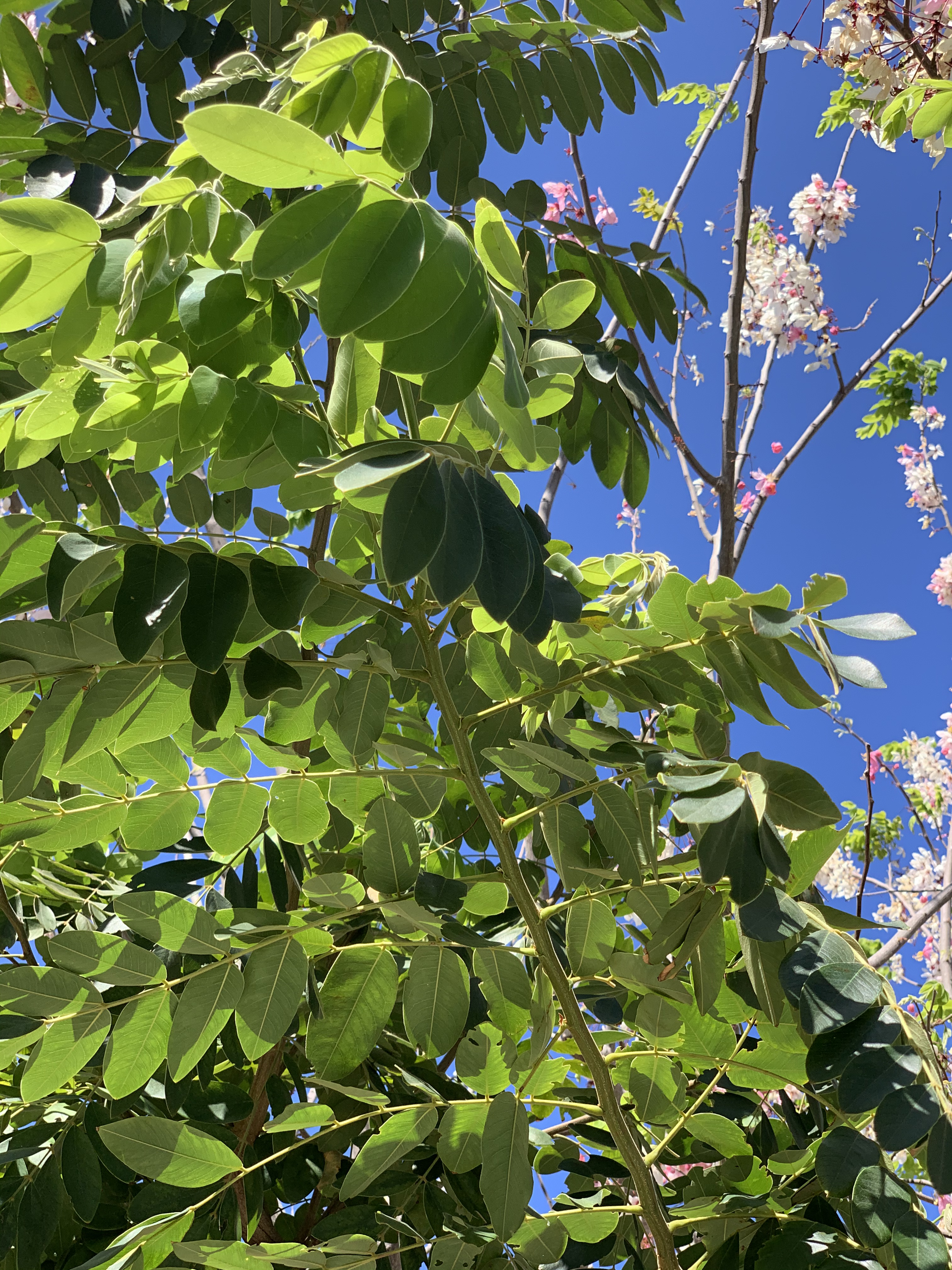

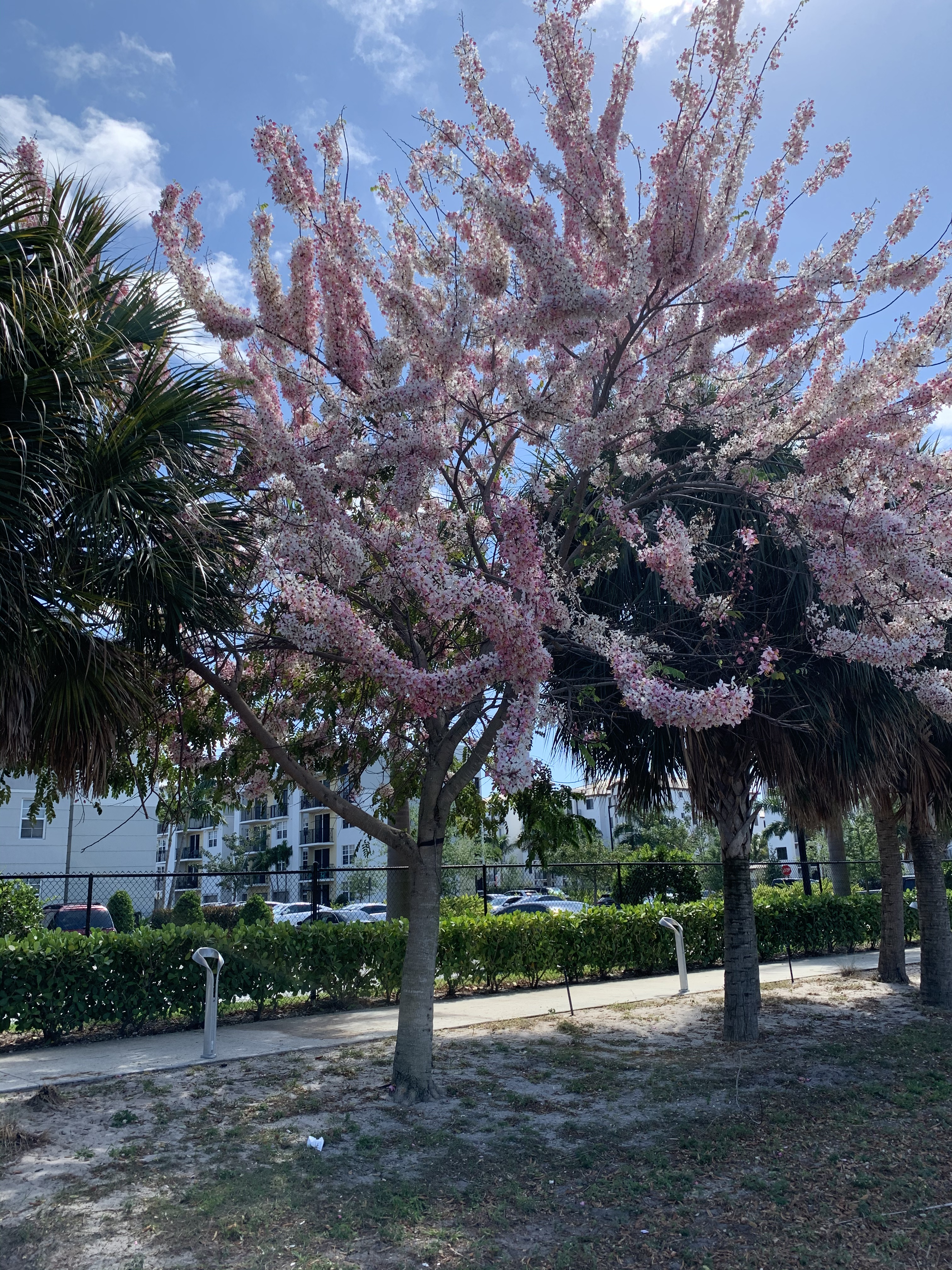

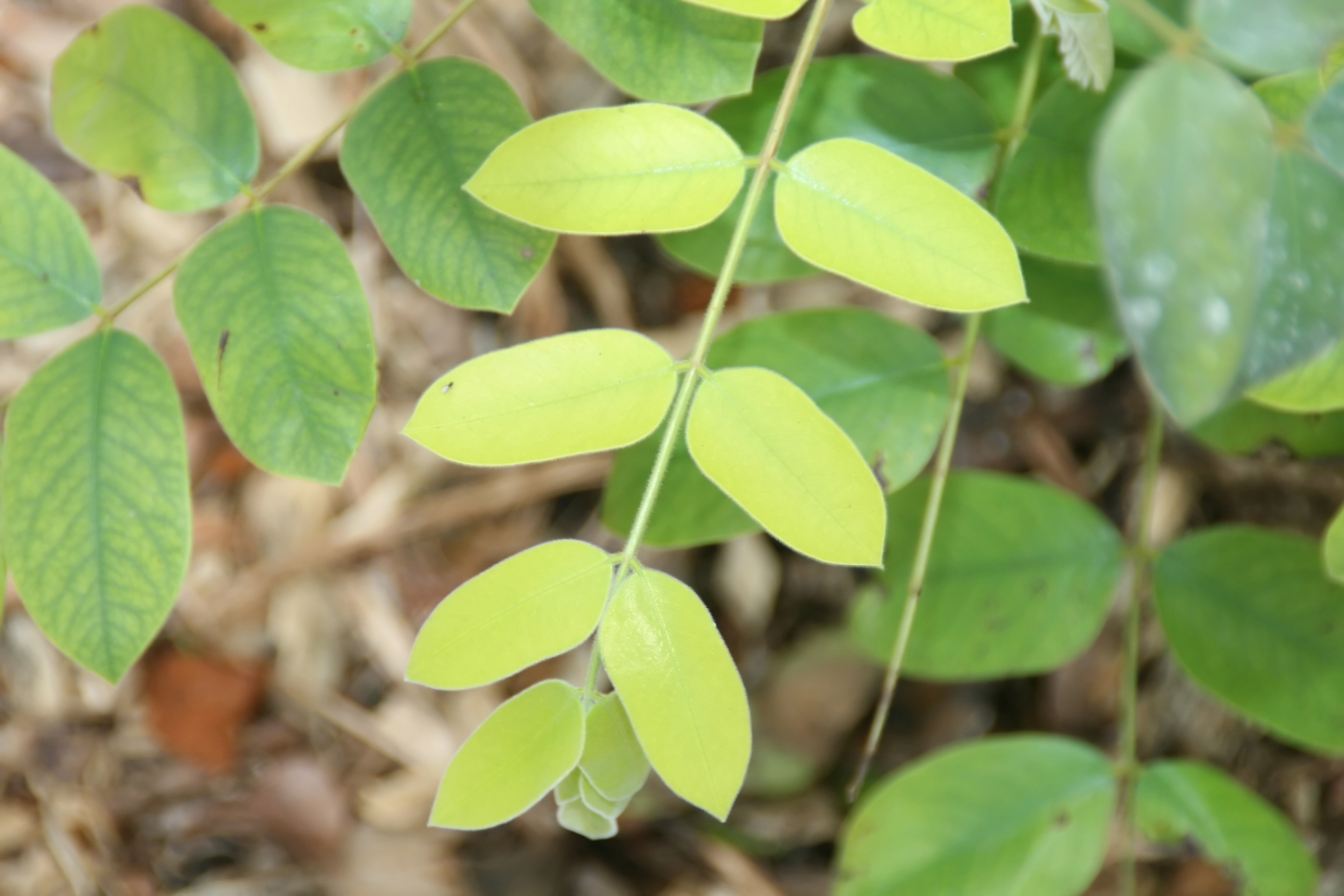
