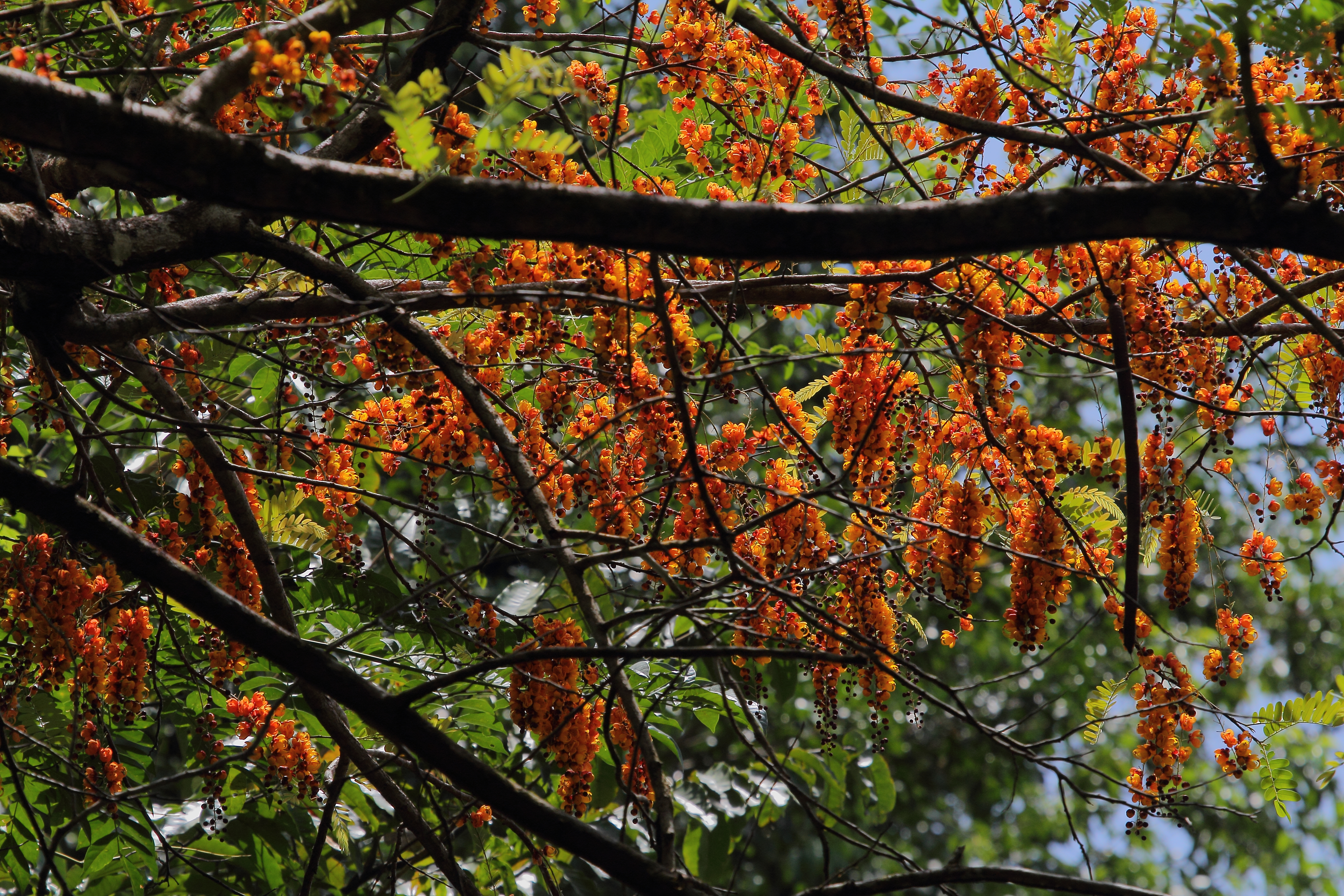
- Flowers cascade

Conservation status
- Least Concern (IUCN 3.1)

Scientific classification
- Kingdom: Plantae
- Clade: Embryophytes
- Clade: Tracheophytes
- Clade: Spermatophytes
- Clade: Angiosperms
- Clade: Eudicots
- Clade: Rosids
- Order: Fabales
- Family: Fabaceae
- Subfamily: Caesalpinioideae
- Genus: Cassia
- Species: C. moschata

Binomial name
- Cassia moschata Kunth

Synonyms
- Cathartocarpus moschatus (Kunth) G.Don

= Cassia moschata =

Species of flowering plant

Cassia moschata, the bronze shower, is a species of flowering plant in the family Fabaceae. It is found from southern Mexico to northern Brazil, and it has been introduced to Sri Lanka. It is used as a street tree in a number of cities in Panama.
