= Cassia sieberiana =

Scientific classification
- Kingdom: Plantae
- Clade: Tracheophytes
- Clade: Angiosperms
- Clade: Eudicots
- Clade: Rosids
- Order: Fabales
- Family: Fabaceae
- Subfamily: Caesalpinioideae
- Genus: Cassia
- Species: C. sieberiana

Binomial name
- Cassia sieberiana DC.

Synonyms
- Cassia kotschyana Oliv.

Species of legume

Cassia sieberiana, the drumstick tree, is a tree in the family Fabaceae native to Africa. It ranges from 10 to 20 metres in height and has very bright yellow flowers. It is used for multiple medical purposes in Africa and is found in the secondary jungle of a forest.

== Description ==
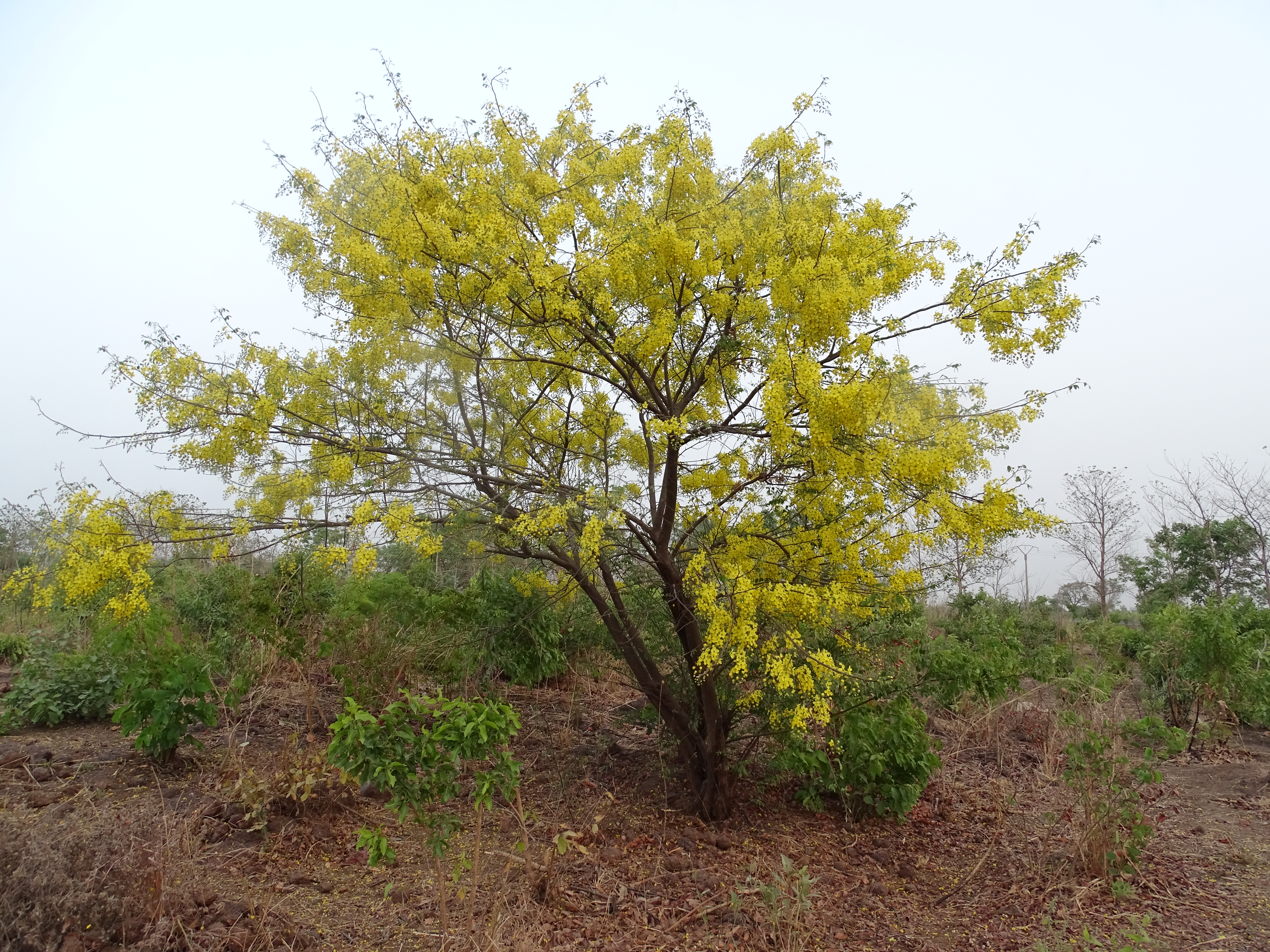
Cassia sieberiana

Individuals of this species are anywhere from 10-20m in height. The bark ranges from a dark grey to black. The lenticels are horizontal and a reddish color. The leaves are arranged in leaflets that contain 7-10 pair of opposite leaves. The upper side of the leaf is moderately shiny while the bottom has very fine nerves with stipules that are deciduous.

This plant has both flowers and fruit. The flowers are a very bright yellow during the dry season, which is from February through March. Flowers are arranged either upright or in pendulous racemes ranging from 30 to 50 cm. There are five sepals with 5 bracts. The petals are 15–20 cm long while the green sepals are 6-7mm in length. There are a total of 10 stamens. The fruit ranges from a dark brown to black color. The fruit is indehiscent in that it stays attached to the tree for an extended amount of time. September through February is when the fruit reaches maturity.

The tree is named sindia in the Wolof language, and sinjan in Bambara language, which literally means "long breast", a reference to the shape of the seed pods.

== Distribution and habitat ==
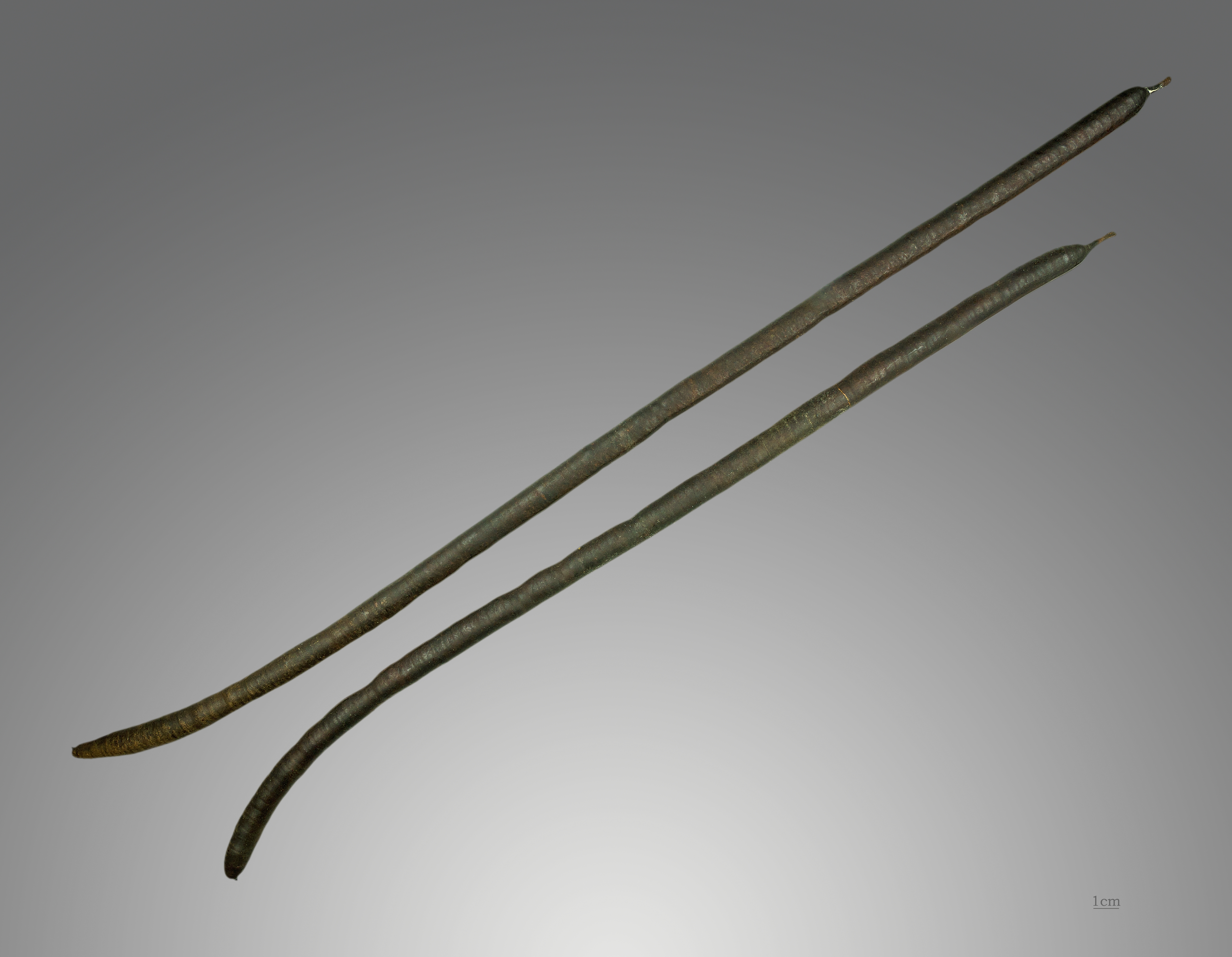
Fruit of Cassia sieberiana, from Bobo-Dioulasso, Burkina Faso.

Cassia sieberiana is found in multiple parts of Africa including the southern part of the Sahel,

Senegal, Sudan, and Uganda. It is also found in East Africa.

Cassia sieberiana grows best in well drained, humid soils with an annual rainfall of approximately 20 inches. It typically grows as a shrub in very dry regions. These shrubs grow in groups of other plants, they usually never grow alone.

== Use ==
=== Food ===
In Nigeria the sweet extract of the stems is used for food. Chew sticks can also be made from the root-wood part of the plant.

=== Other uses ===
Cassia sieberiana is used to make tools, pestles, mortars, and also used for construction because it is a very hard wood that is resistant to termites. In addition, it is also an ornamental tree because of its brightly colored flowers. Some cultures also incorporate the plant in their religion and for superstitious and magical purposes.

Parts of the plant have also been used traditionally as teeth cleaning twigs.
