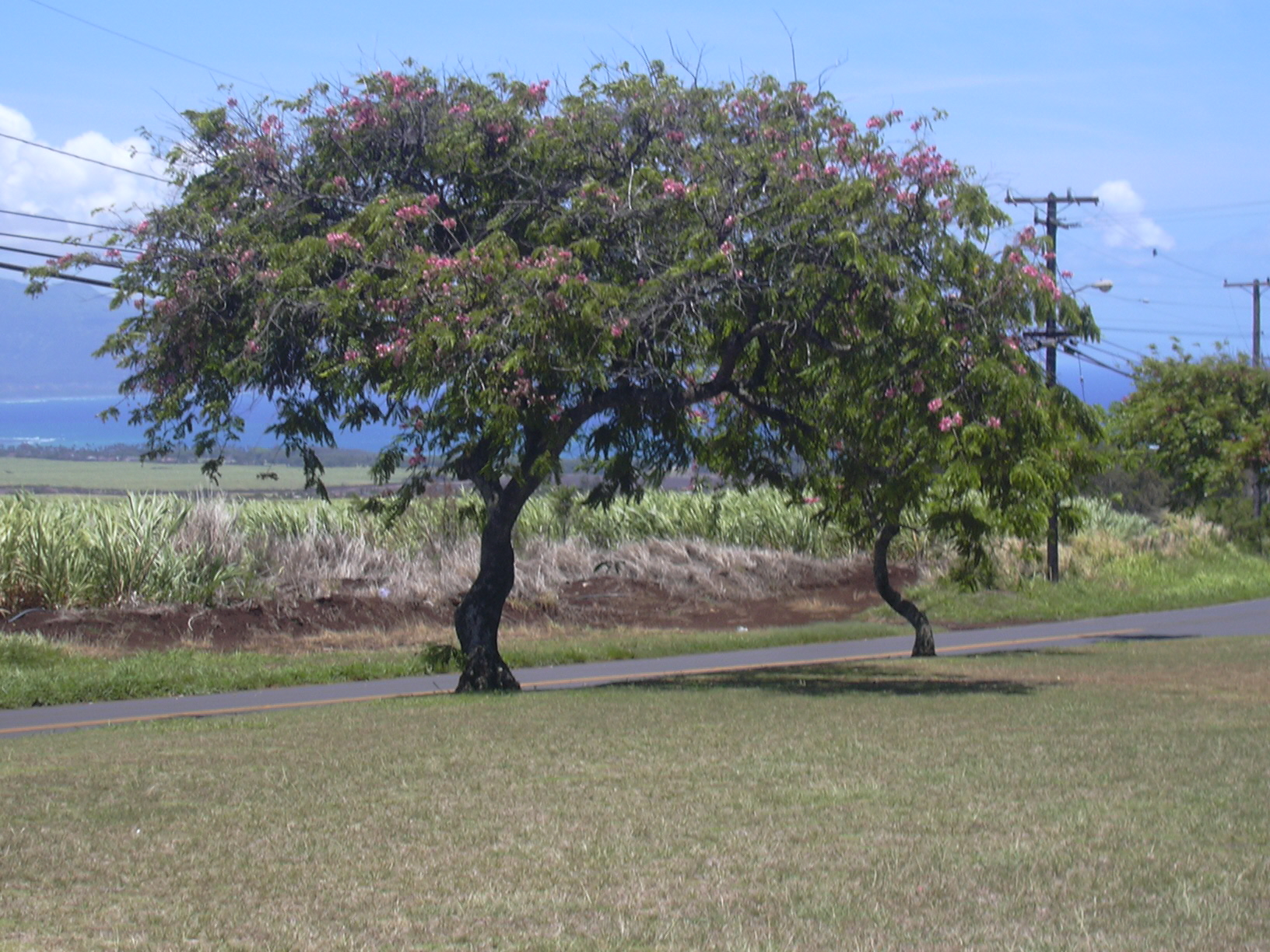
- Cassia javanica

Scientific classification
- Kingdom: Plantae
- Clade: Tracheophytes
- Clade: Angiosperms
- Clade: Eudicots
- Clade: Rosids
- Order: Fabales
- Family: Fabaceae
- Subfamily: Caesalpinioideae
- Tribe: Cassieae
- Subtribe: Cassiinae
- Genus: Cassia; L.

Species
- Hundreds; see text

Synonyms
- Bactyrilobium Willd. (1809); Cassia sect. Fistula DC. ex Colladon (1816); Cassia subgen. Fistula (DC.) Benth. (1870); Cassia sensu Link (1831); Cassia subgen. vel sect. Fistula sensu Benth. (1871); Cassia subgen. Cassia sensu De Wit (1955); Cassia sensu Irwin & Barneby (1981); Cassiana Raf. (1818); Cathartocarpus Pers. (1805_ (pro parte); Mac-leayia Montrouz. (1860)

= Cassia (genus) =

Genus of legumes

Cassia is a genus of flowering plants in the legume family, Fabaceae, and the subfamily Caesalpinioideae. Species are known commonly as cassias. The genus includes 37 species and has a pantropical distribution. Species of the genera Senna and Chamaecrista were previously included in Cassia. Cassia now generally includes the largest species of the legume subtribe Cassiinae, usually mid-sized to tall trees.

Cassia is also the English common name of some unrelated species in the genus Cinnamomum of the family Lauraceae.

== Ecology ==
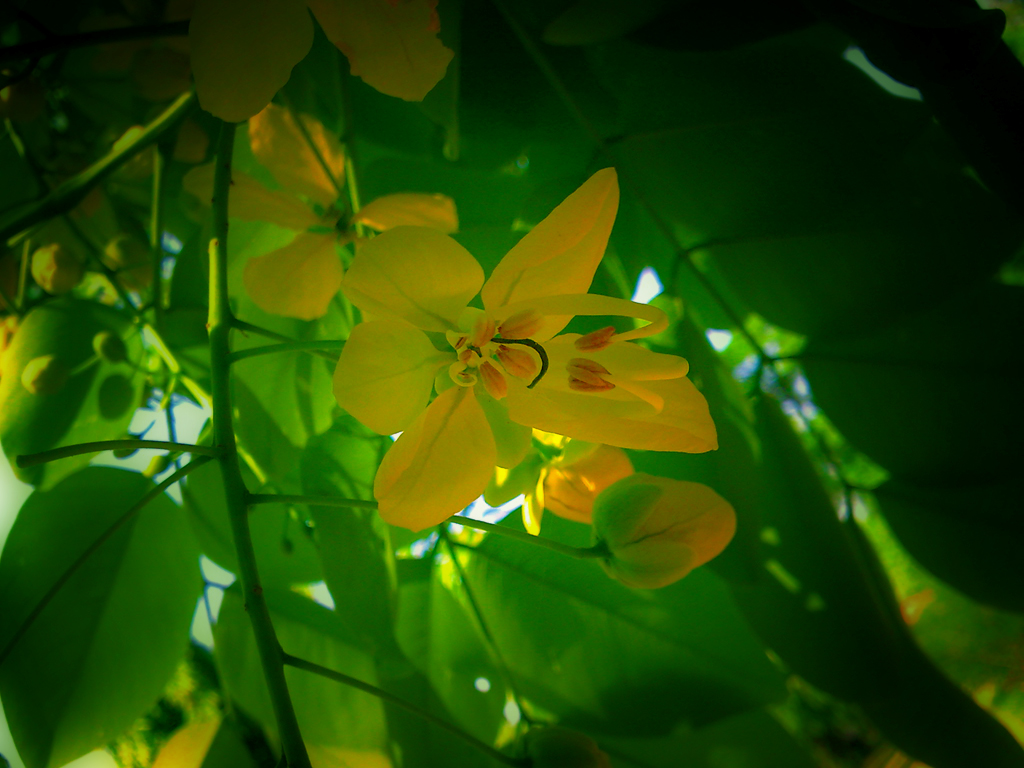
Cassia fistula

Cassia species occur in a range of climates. Some can be utilized widely as ornamental plants. They have been used in reforestation projects, and species from desert climates can be used to prevent desertification.

Cassia species are used as food plants by the caterpillars of many lepidopteran taxa. For example, the skipper Astraptes fulgerator and the pierids Catopsilia pomona and C. pyranthe are all seen on Cassia fistula. The latter utilizes several other cassias, as well.

The plant pathogenic viruses cassia yellow blotch bromovirus and cassia yellow spot potyvirus were first described from Cassia.

== Uses ==
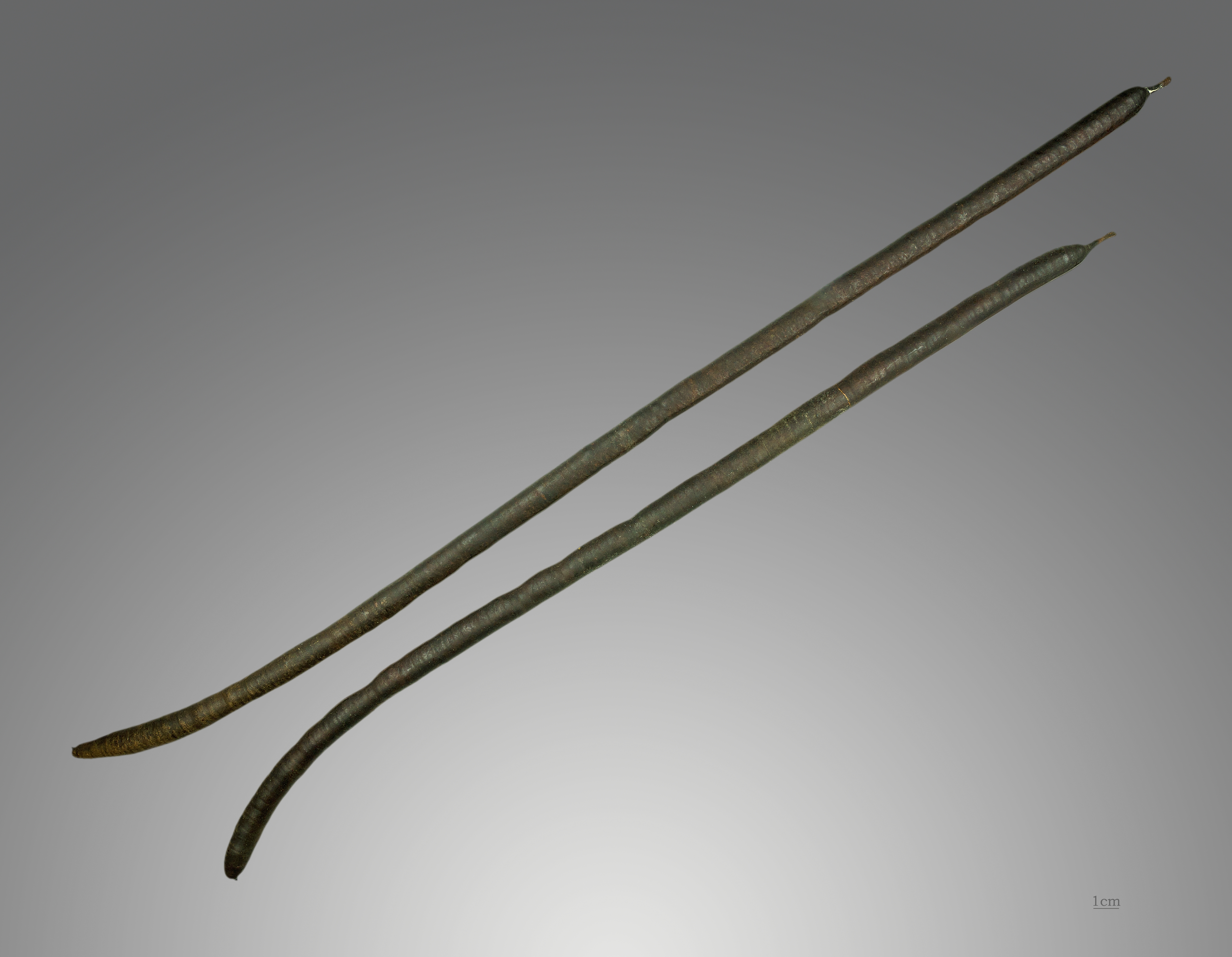
Cassia sieberiana fruits

Because the name Cassia is not precise, it is sometimes difficult to know what is meant by references to plants known as "cassias". Cassia gum, for example, is made from Senna obtusifolia, a species formerly included in genus Cassia.

Genera Cassia and Senna are both known in systems of traditional medicine. Cassia fistula, for example, is used in Ayurvedic medicine.

There exists some culinary use for cassias. The fruit of some species is edible. In Central America, its pods are stewed into a molasses-like syrup, taken as a sweetener and for its nutritional and medicinal effects. Some have toxins in their seeds, however.

== Systematics and taxonomy ==
There are hundreds of Cassia species, but it is unclear just how many. One estimate stands at 692. The genus was a wastebasket taxon for a long time, used to classify plants that did not fit well anywhere else. Over 1000 species have belonged to Cassia over the years. Many taxa have since been transferred to more appropriate genera, such as Senna. Plants of the World Online accepts 37 species.

=== Species ===
Cassia comprises the following species:

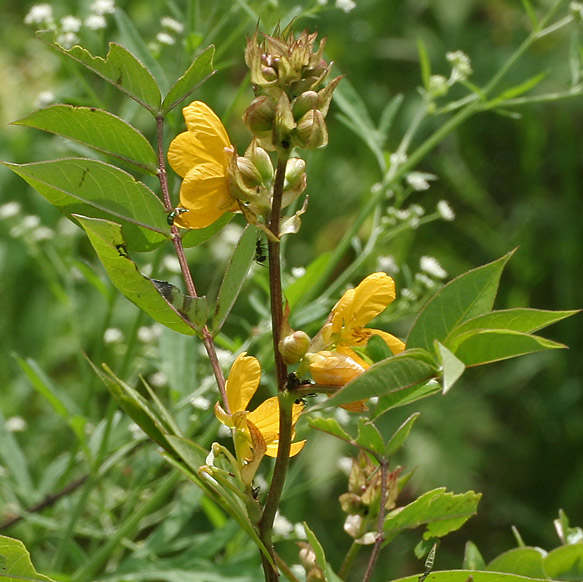
Cassia occidentalis

- Cassia abbreviata Oliv.
  - subsp. abbreviata Oliv.
  - subsp. beareana (Holmes) Brenan
  - subsp. kassneri (Baker f.) Brenan
- Cassia afrofistula Brenan — Kenyan shower cassia
- Cassia angolensis Welw. ex Hiern
- Cassia arereh Delile
- Cassia artensis Beauvis.
- Cassia aubrevillei Pellegr.
- Cassia bakeriana Craib—pink cassia, wishing-tree
- Cassia brewsteri (F.Muell.) F.Muell. ex Benth. — Brewster's cassia, cigar cassia
- Cassia burttii Baker f.
- Cassia cowanii H.S.Irwin & Barneby
  - var. cowanii H.S.Irwin & Barneby
  - var. guianensis (Sandwith) H.S.Irwin & Barneby
  - var. peruviana (J.F.Macbr.) H.S.Irwin & Barneb
- Cassia eremophila Vogel—desert cassia
- Cassia fastuosa Willd. ex Vogel
  - var. calva H.S.Irwin & Barneby
  - var. fastuosa
- Cassia ferruginea (Schrad.) DC.
  - var. ferruginea
  - var. vellozoana H.S.Irwin & Barneby
- Cassia fikifiki Aubrév. & Pellegr.
- Cassia fistula L. — golden shower, Indian-laburnum, purging cassia
- Cassia grandis L.f. — pink shower cassia
- Cassia hintonii Sandwith
- Cassia hippophallus Capuron
- Cassia javanica L.—apple-blossom cassia, Palawan cherry
  - subsp. bartonii F.M.Bailey
  - subsp. javanica L.
    - var. javanica L.
    - var. microcalyx Irwin & Barneby
  - subsp. nodosa (Buch.-Ham. ex Roxb.) K.Larsen & S.S.Larsen
  - subsp. pubiflora (Merr.) K.Larsen
- Cassia johannae Vatke
- Cassia lancangensis Y.Y. Qian
- Cassia leiandra Benth.
- Cassia leptophylla Vogel—gold medallion tree
- Cassia mannii Oliv.
- Cassia marksiana (F.M.Bailey) Domin
- Cassia midas H.S.Irwin & Barneby
- Cassia moschata Kunth
- Cassia mystacicarpa Rizzini & Heringer
- Cassia psilocarpa Welw.
- Cassia queenslandica C.T.White
- Cassia × regia Standl.
- Cassia roxburghii DC.—Roxburgh's cassia
- Cassia rubriflora Ducke
- Cassia sieberiana DC.
- Cassia spruceana Benth.
- Cassia swartzioides Ducke
  - var. scarlatina (Ducke) H.S.Irwin & Barneby
  - var. swartzioides
- Cassia thyrsoidea Brenan
- Cassia tomentella (Benth.) Domin

== See also ==
- Sydney Percy-Lancaster
