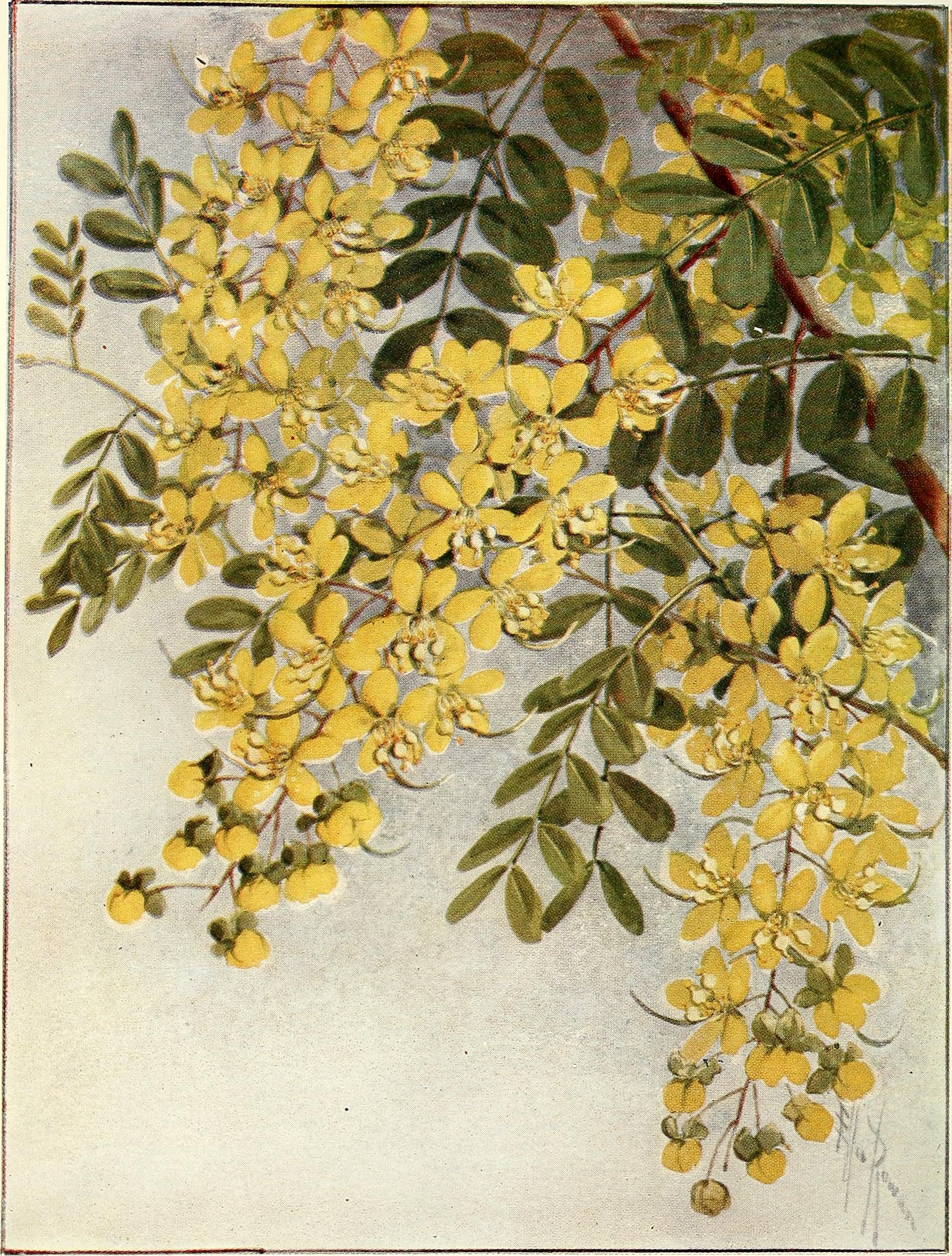
- 1909 illustration

Conservation status
- Least Concern (IUCN 3.1)

Scientific classification
- Kingdom: Plantae
- Clade: Tracheophytes
- Clade: Angiosperms
- Clade: Eudicots
- Clade: Rosids
- Order: Fabales
- Family: Fabaceae
- Subfamily: Caesalpinioideae
- Genus: Cassia
- Species: C. tomentella

Binomial name
- Cassia tomentella (Benth.) Domin

Synonyms
- Cassia brewsteri var. tomentella Benth.

= Cassia tomentella =

Species of plant

Cassia tomentella, the velvet bean tree, is a species of flowering plant in the family Fabaceae, native to Queensland. It is used as a street tree in Brisbane.
