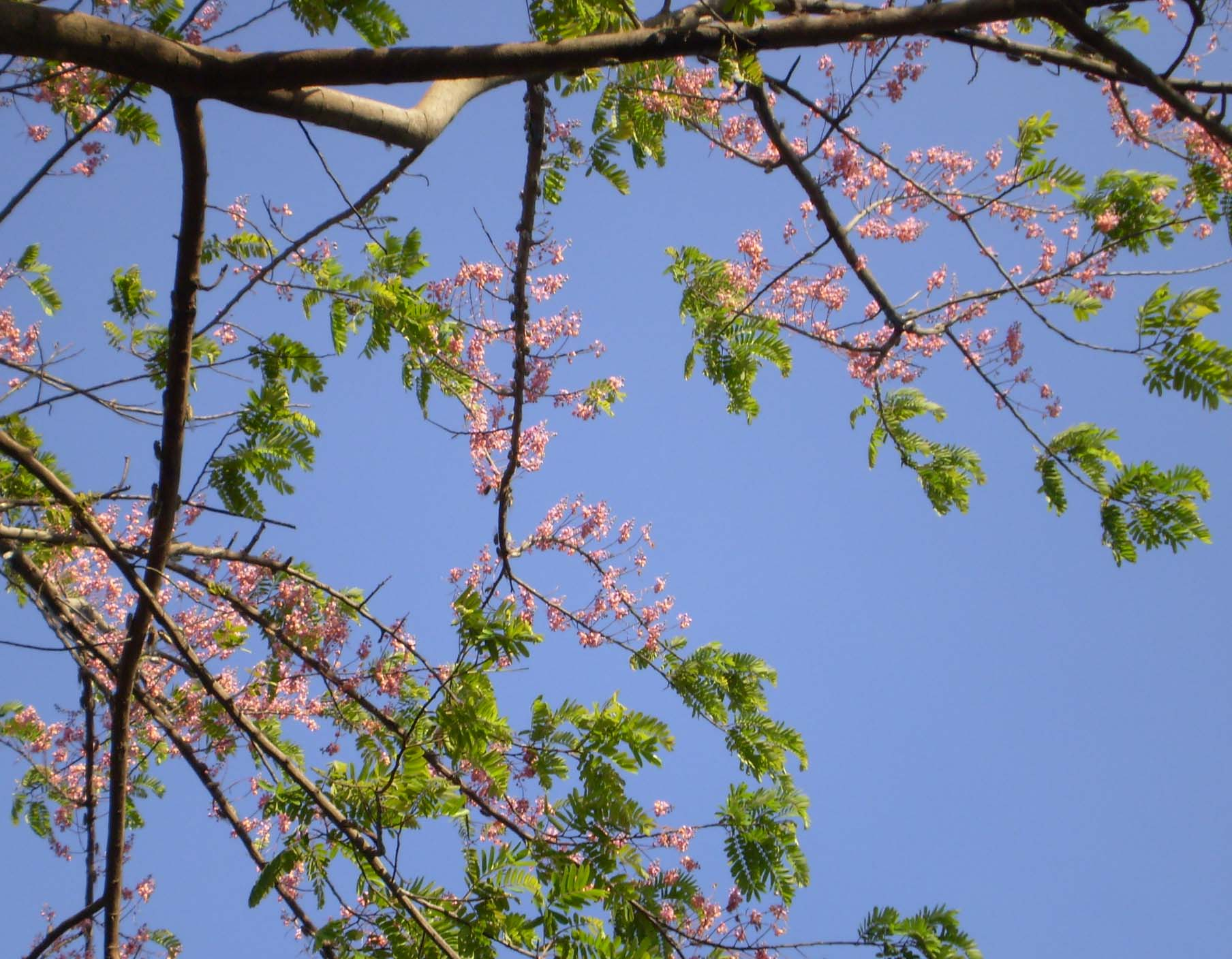

Scientific classification
- Kingdom: Plantae
- Clade: Tracheophytes
- Clade: Angiosperms
- Clade: Eudicots
- Clade: Rosids
- Order: Fabales
- Family: Fabaceae
- Subfamily: Caesalpinioideae
- Genus: Cassia
- Species: C. grandis

Binomial name
- Cassia grandis L.f.

Synonyms
- Cassia brasiliana; Cassia brasiliana var. tomentosa Miq.; Cassia brasiliensis; Cassia mollis; Cassia pachycarpa

= Cassia grandis =

Species of legume

Cassia grandis, one of several species called pink shower tree, and known as carao in Spanish, is a flowering plant in the family Fabaceae, native to the neotropics, that grows up to 30 m (98 ft). The species is distributed from southern Mexico, to Venezuela and Ecuador. It grows in forests and open fields at lower elevations, and is known to be planted as an ornamental. In at least Costa Rica, its pods are stewed into a molasses-like syrup, taken as a sweetener and for its nutritional and medicinal effects, called Jarabe (or Miel) de Carao.

== Growth ==
The tree's leaves are pinnate and deciduous, with 8-20 pairs of leaflets of 3–5 cm (1–2 in). During the dry season, the tree sheds its old leaves, giving way to racemes of pastel pink flowers. The long, wood-like fruit capsules reach lengths of up to 50 cm (20 in) and have many seeds, which are separated by resinous membranes that taste somewhat like carob.

Larvae of two bruchid beetle species (Pygiopachymerus lineola and Zabrotes interstitialis) feed on the seeds and provide access to moths whose larvae feed on the pulp. A pair of scientists have speculated that now extinct ground sloths and gomphotheres ate the fruit around and the seeds and helped with dispersal.
