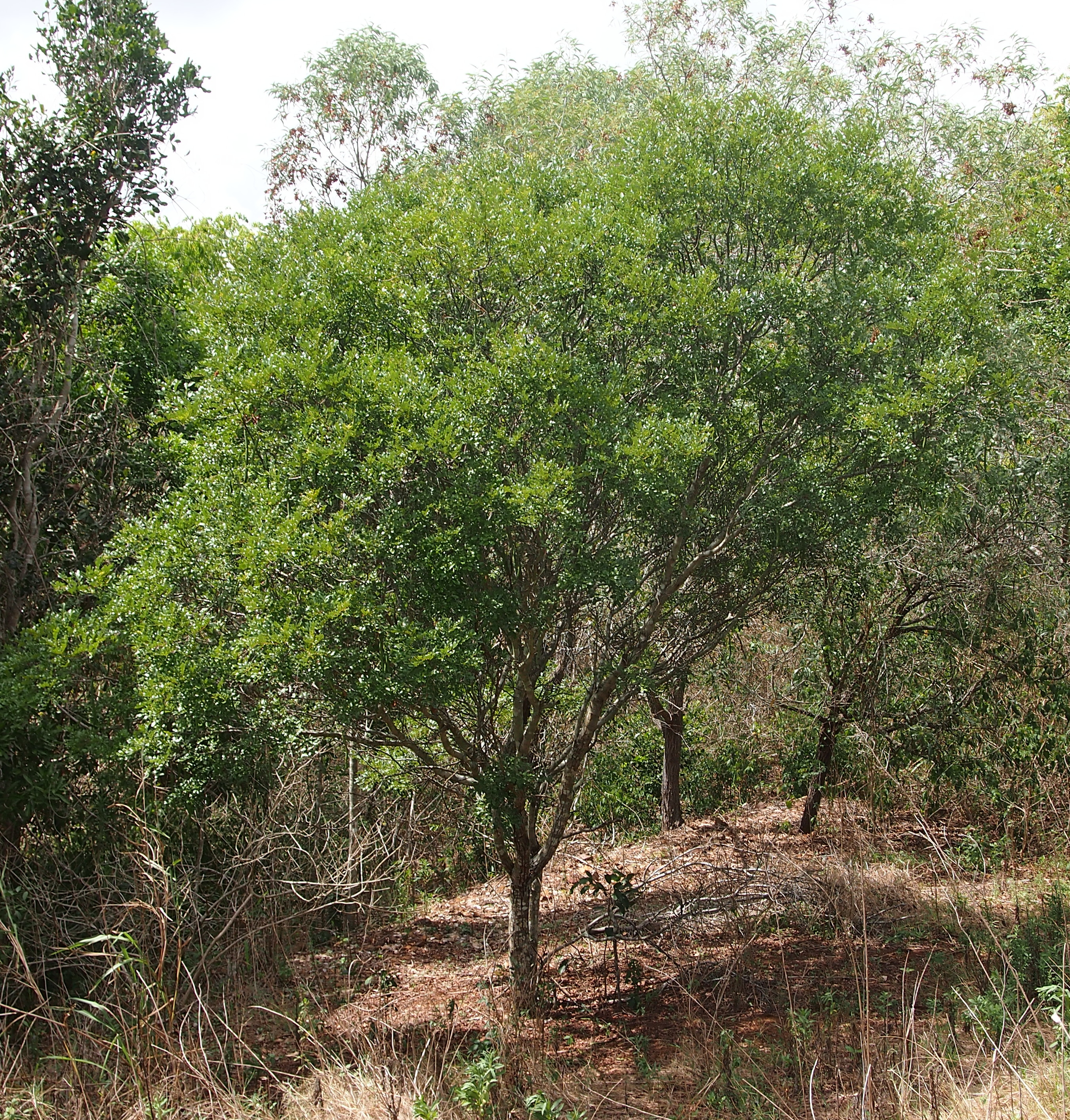

Scientific classification
- Kingdom: Plantae
- Clade: Tracheophytes
- Clade: Angiosperms
- Clade: Eudicots
- Clade: Rosids
- Order: Fabales
- Family: Fabaceae
- Subfamily: Caesalpinioideae
- Genus: Cassia
- Species: C. brewsteri

Binomial name
- Cassia brewsteri (F.Muell.) Benth.

= Cassia brewsteri =

Species of legume

Cassia brewsteri, commonly known as Brewster's cassia, Leichhardt bean, cassia pea and bean tree is a species of shrubs or small trees, of the plant family Fabaceae. They grow naturally in Queensland, Australia. They primarily grow in open forest, and occasionally in monsoon forest.

Cassia brewsteri, as with other Cassia, produces pinnate leaves. In the case of Cassia brewsteri the leaflets are approximately 5 cm long, bright green, glossy or waxy above and whitish-green below.

Flowers are yellow, often with red markings, and produced in racemes. The flowers are followed by round pods, up to 45 cm long.

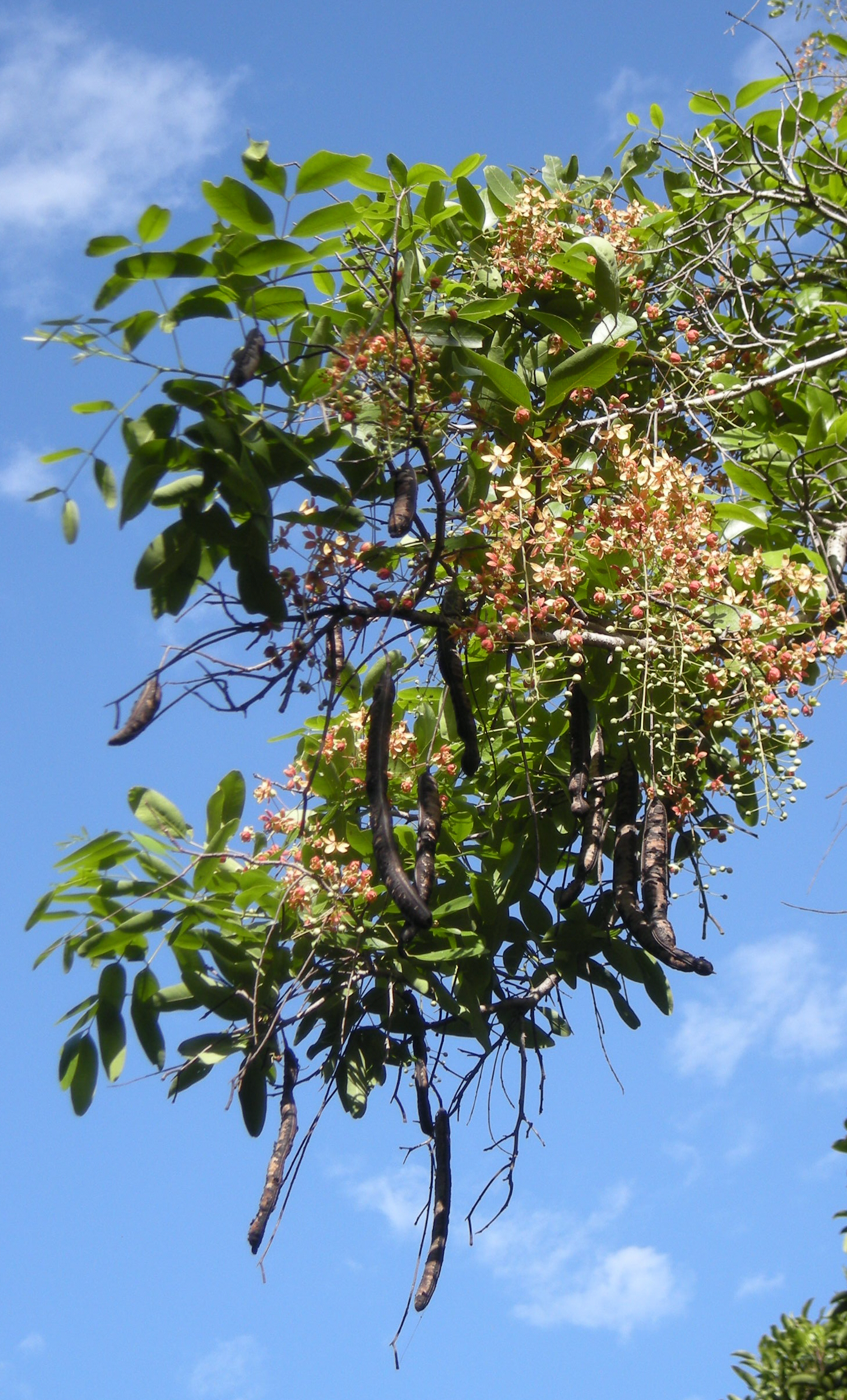
Flowers and pods
