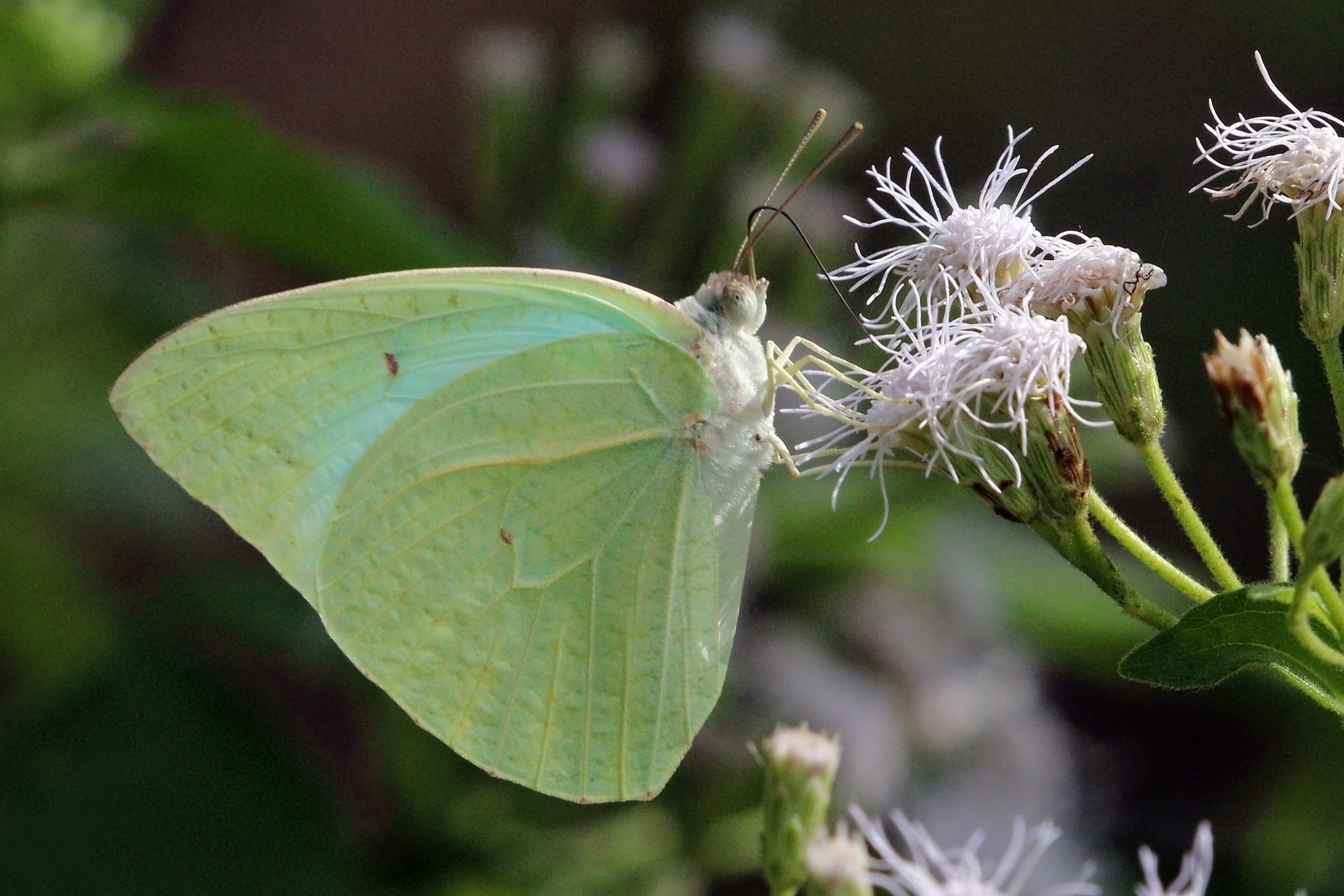
- Male, Ghana
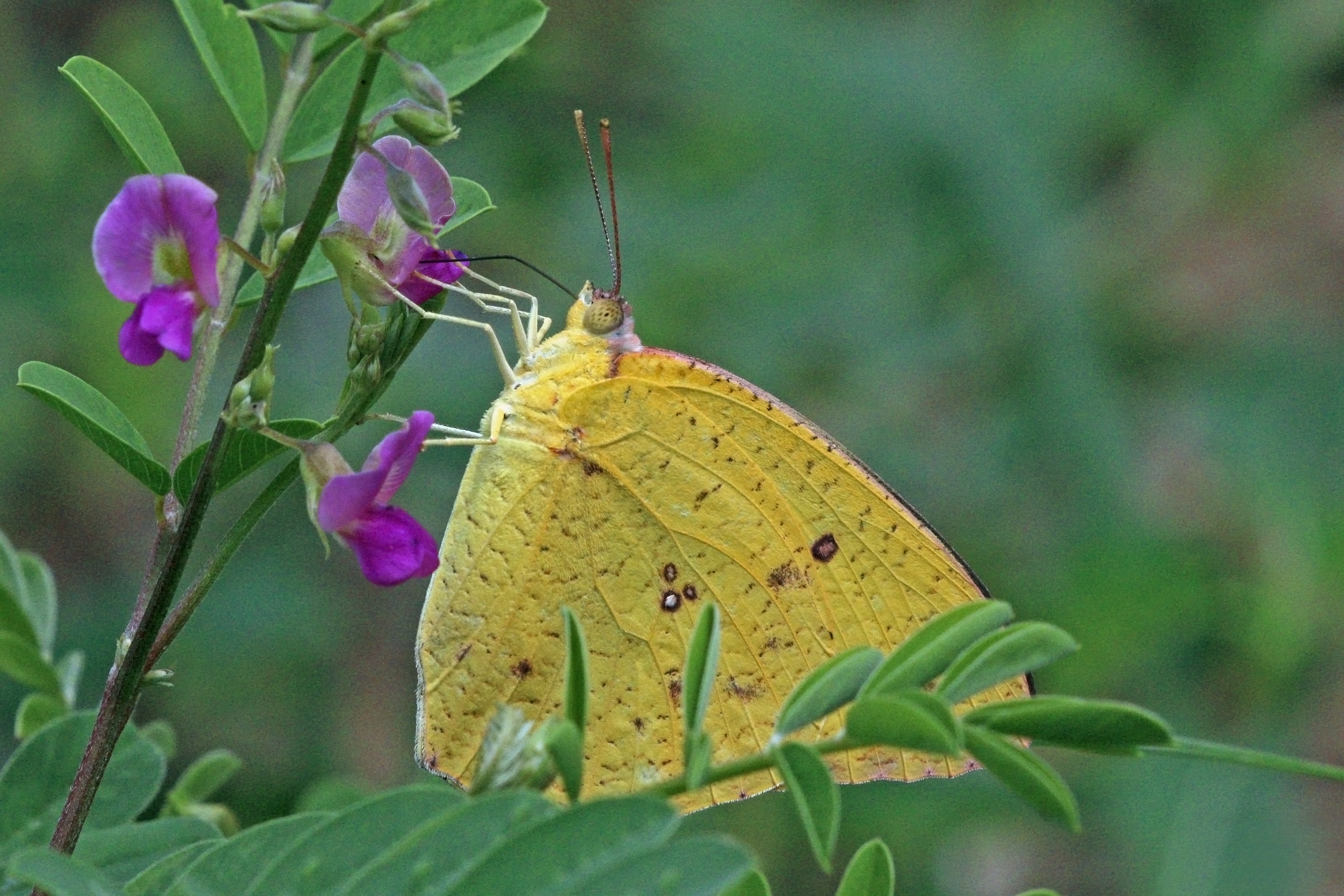
- Female; Aburi Botanical Gardens, Ghana

Conservation status
- Least Concern (IUCN 3.1)

Scientific classification
- Kingdom: Animalia
- Phylum: Arthropoda
- Clade: Pancrustacea
- Class: Insecta
- Order: Lepidoptera
- Family: Pieridae
- Genus: Catopsilia
- Species: C. florella

Binomial name
- Catopsilia florella (Fabricius, 1775)

Synonyms
- Papilio florella Fabricius, 1775; Colias pyrene Swainson, 1821; Callidryas hyblaea Boisduval, 1836; Callidryas rhadia Boisduval, 1836; Pontia marcellina Bertoloni, 1850; Catopsilia aleurona Butler, 1876; Catopsilia rufosparsa Butler, 1880; Callidryas swainsoni Westwood, 1881; Catopsilia florella ab. subpyrene Strand, 1911; Catopsilia florella florella f. inornata Dufrane, 1947; Catopsilia florella florella ab. biannulata Dufrane, 1947; Catopsilia florella florella ab. houzeaui Dufrane, 1947; Catopsilia florella f. peregrina Stoneham, 1957; Catopsilia florella f. duplicata Stoneham, 1957; Catopsilia florella f. wandriana Stoneham, 1957

= Catopsilia florella =

Species of butterfly

Catopsilia florella, the African migrant, African emigrant, or common vagrant, is a butterfly of the family Pieridae. It is found in Africa (including Madagascar), Arabia (United Arab Emirates, Saudi Arabia, Oman) and the Canary Islands. Like Catopsilia pomona, this species also has a habit of migration. Many early authors mentioned the presence of this species in Asia; but those were probably due to confusion arises as Catopsilia pyranthe females exhibit a lot of seasonal variations. Catopsilia florella is not included as a species in India in any recent checklists.

The wingspan is 54–60 mm for males and 56–66 mm for females. Adults are on wing year-round. From South Africa, adults migrate from summer to autumn. They fly in a north-eastern direction.

The larvae feed on Senna occidentalis, Senna septentrionalis, Senna petersiana, Senna italica, Cassia javanica, and Cassia fistula.

Torben Larsen developed a species numbering system for his 2005 publication Butterflies of West Africa. This species is #36. The 'Larsen' numbers have since been used with permission in A Sharp Eye on Butterflies of Ghana.

== Gallery ==
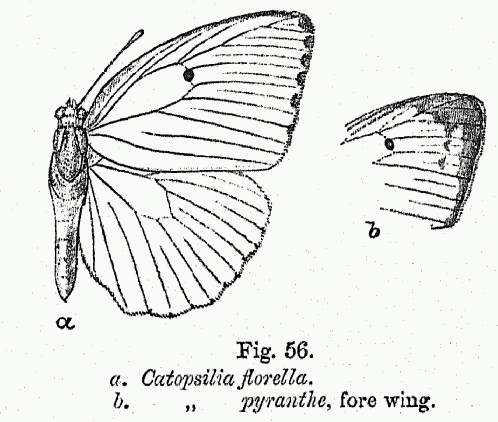

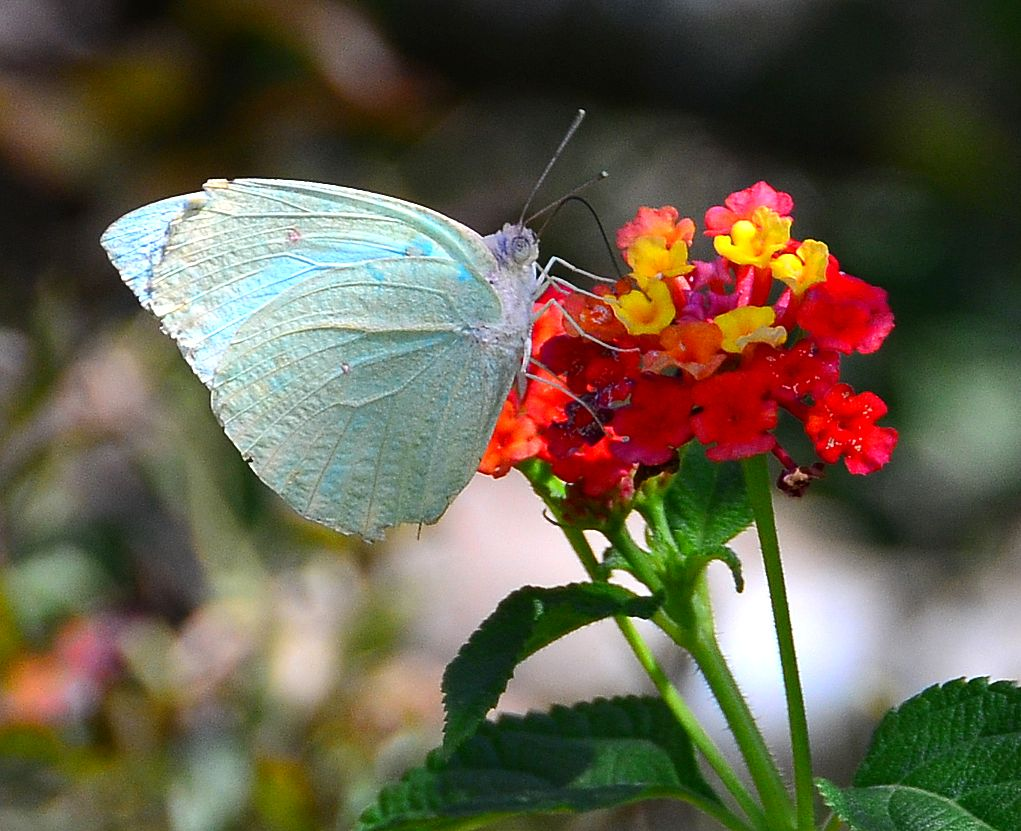

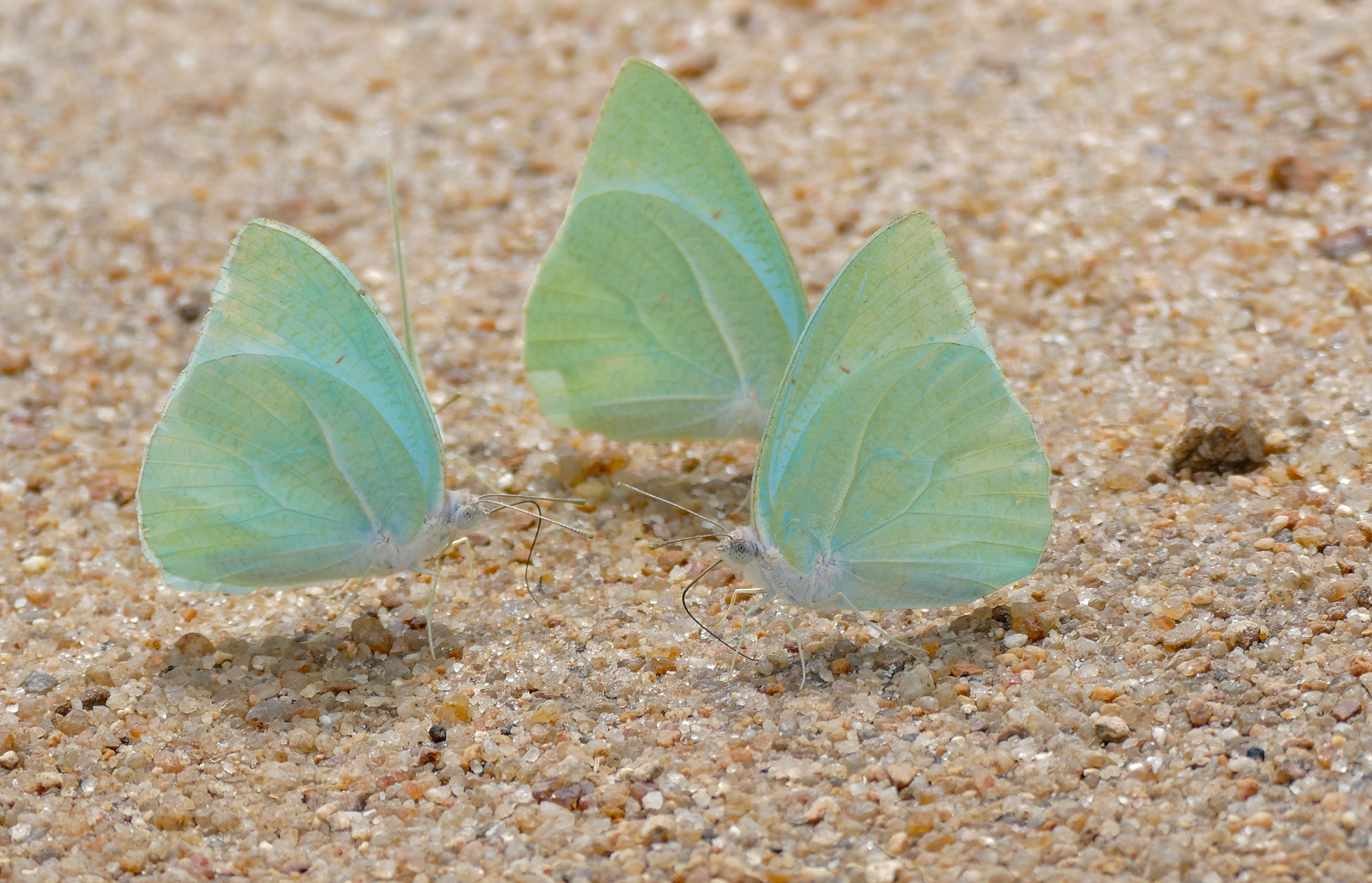

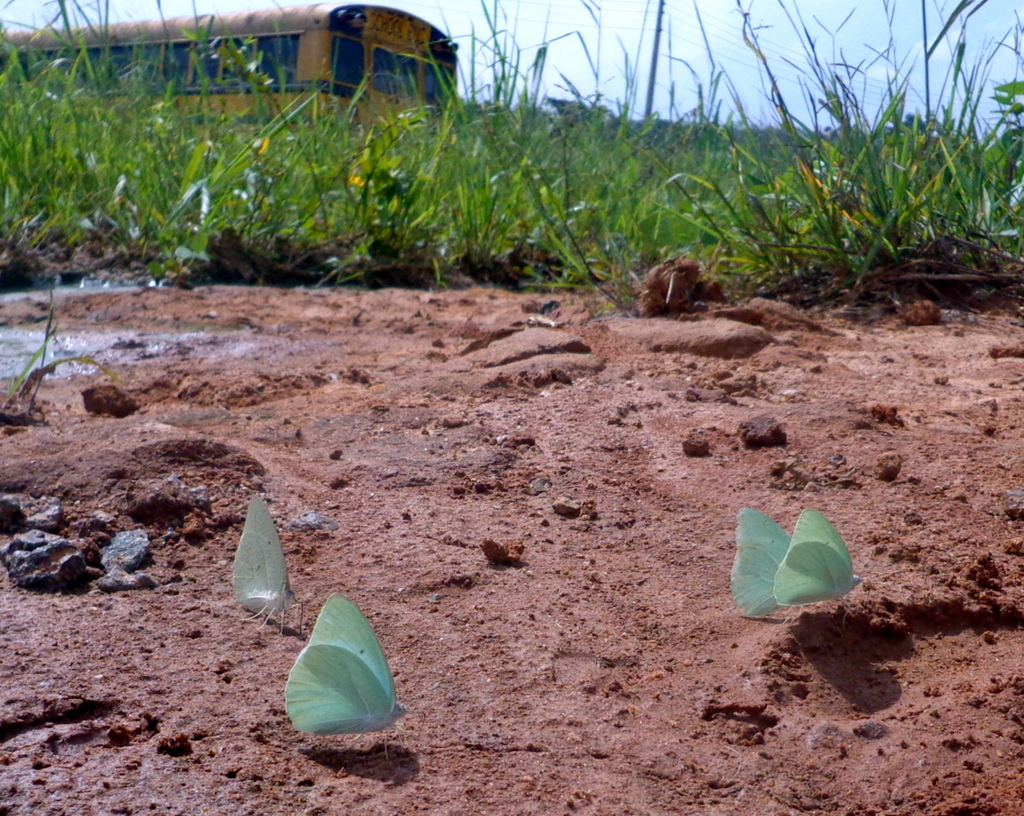
Mud-puddling, Lagos, Nigeria

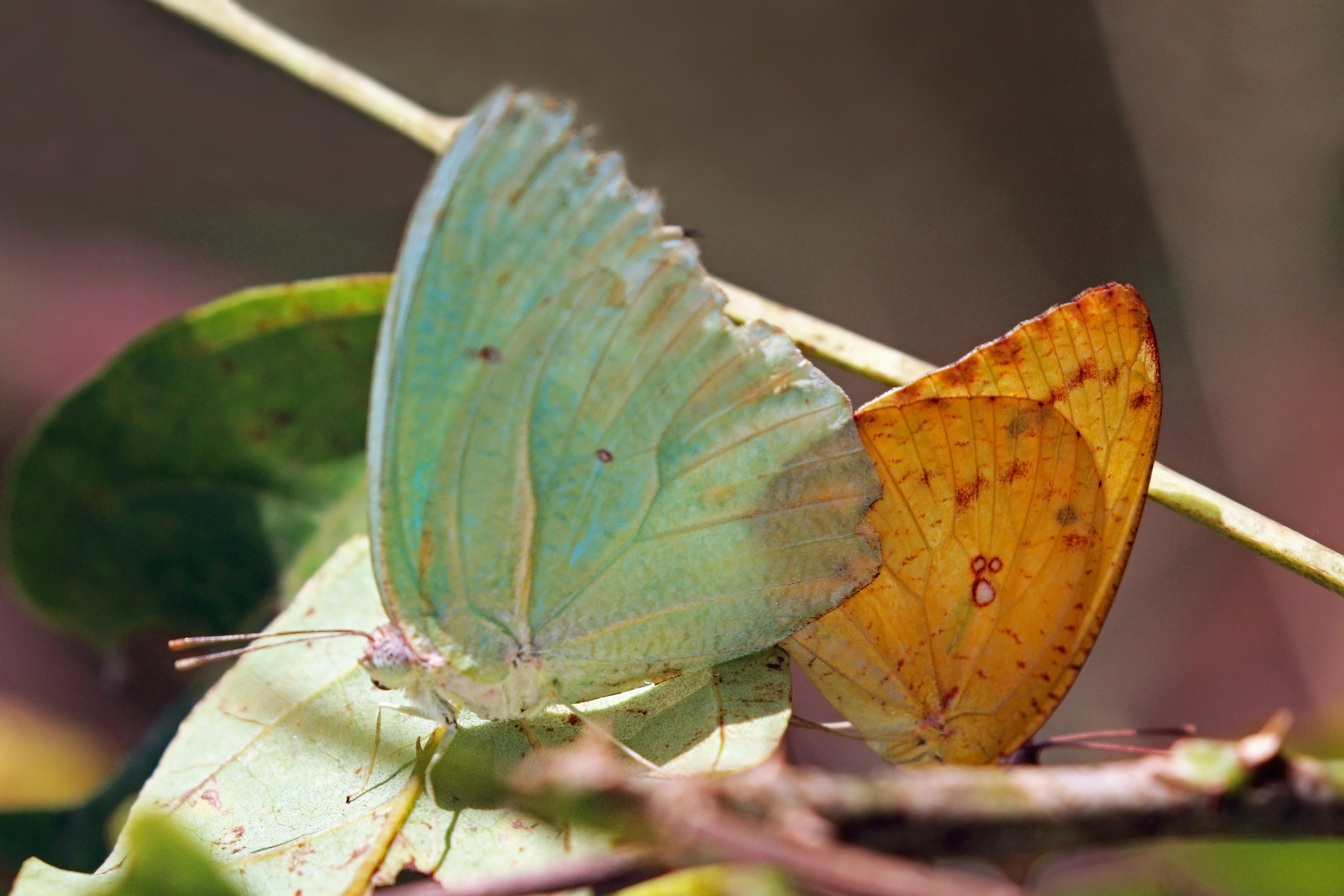
mating migrant male (l) & dry season female (r), Gambia

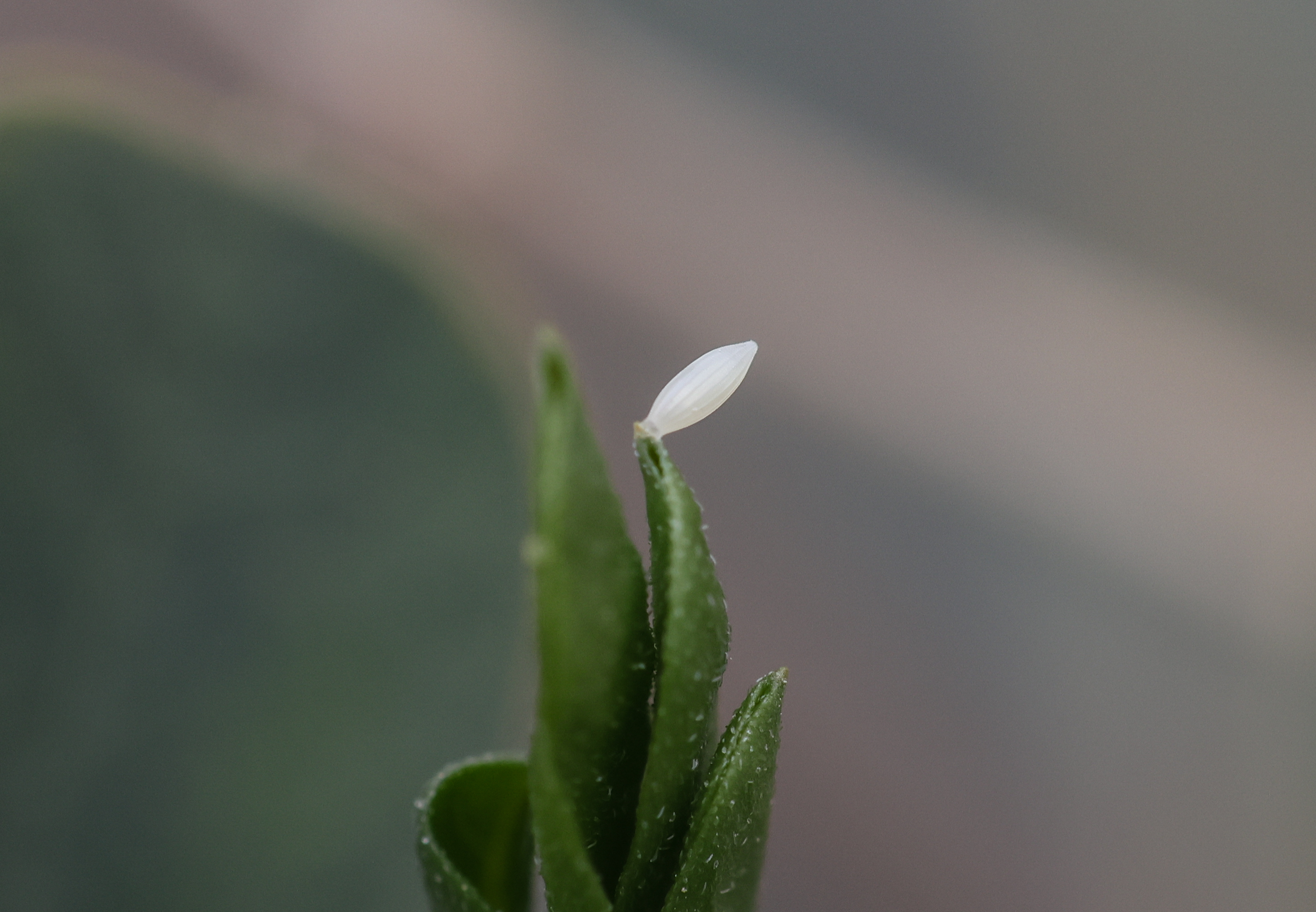
Egg from United Arab Emirates

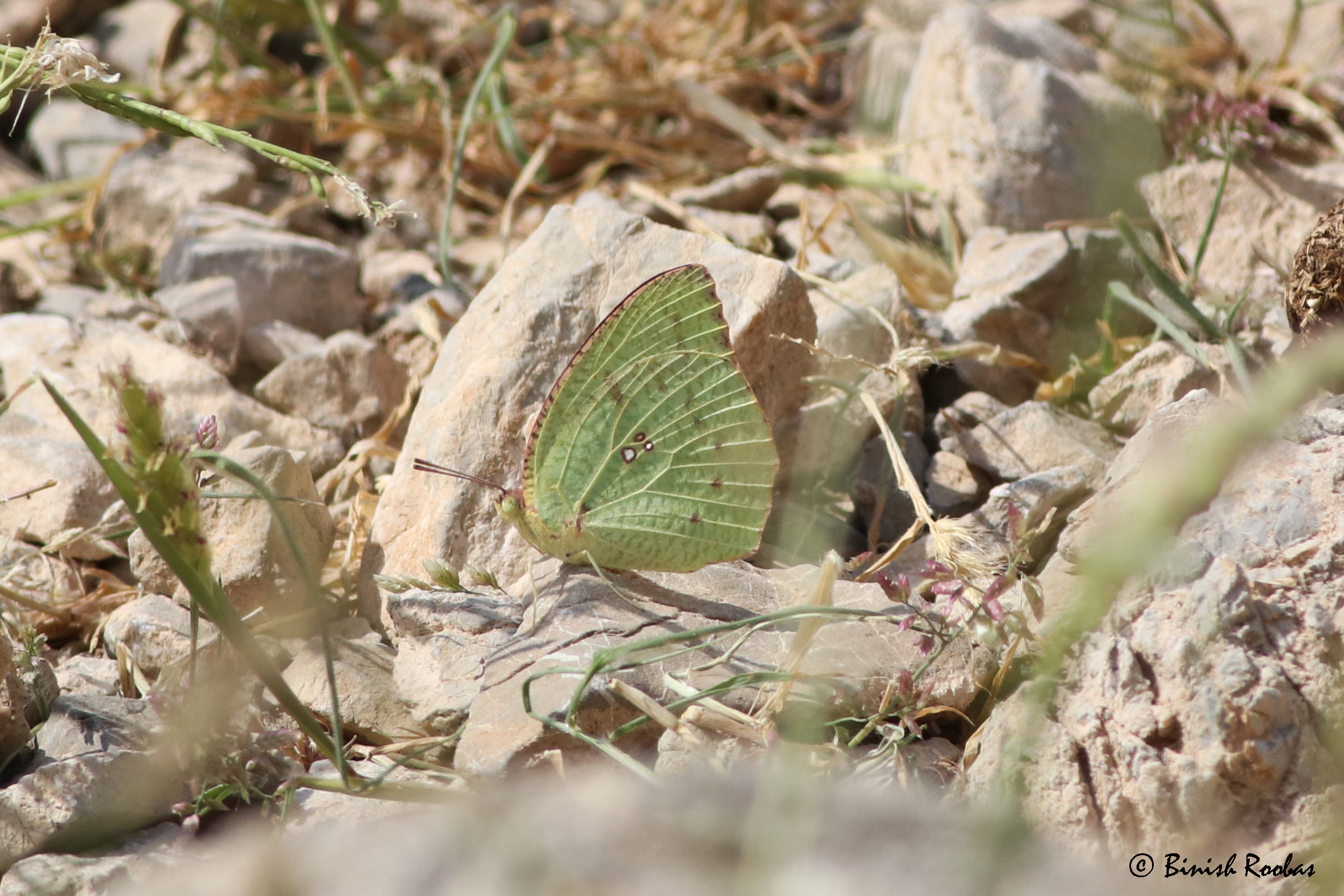
from United Arab Emirates
