= Legum =

Legum is an English surname. Notable people with the surname include:

- Colin Legum (1919–2003), British anti-apartheid activist
- Judd Legum (born 1978), American journalist, lawyer, and political staffer
- Margaret Legum (1933–2007), British anti-apartheid activist

== See also ==
- Legume
