= White migrant =

White migrant may refer to:

- Catopsilia pyranthe, a medium-sized butterfly of the family Pieridae found in South Asia, Southeast Asia, and parts of Australia
- White émigré, a Russian subject who emigrated from Imperial Russia in the wake of the Russian Revolution and Russian Civil War, and who was in opposition to the contemporary Russian political climate
