= Catopsilia thauruma =

Madagascar migrant

Scientific classification
- Kingdom: Animalia
- Phylum: Arthropoda
- Class: Insecta
- Order: Lepidoptera
- Family: Pieridae
- Genus: Catopsilia
- Species: C. thauruma

Binomial name
- Catopsilia thauruma (Reakirt, 1866)

Synonyms
- Callidryas thauruma Reakirt, 1866; Callidryas fiaduma Hewitson, 1867; Eronia grandidieri Mabille, 1877; Catopsilia decipiens Butler, 1880; Catopsilia grandidieri var. mauritania Le Cerf, 1916; Catopsilia mabillei Neustetter, 1929

Species of butterfly

Catopsilia thauruma, the Madagascar migrant, is a butterfly in the family Pieridae. It is found in the Indian Ocean on Madagascar, Mauritius and Réunion. The habitat consists of forest margins and anthropogenic environments.

The larvae feed on Cassia siamea.
