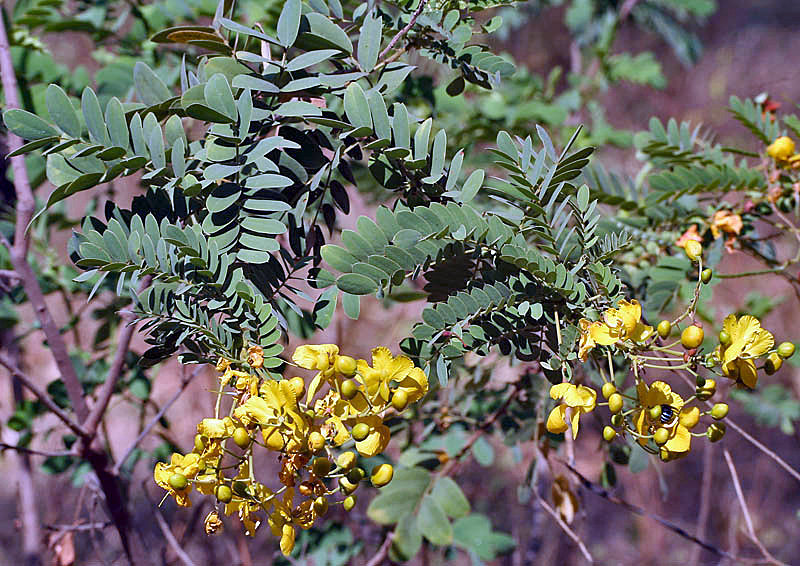
- At Sindhrot near Vadodara, Gujarat

Scientific classification
- Kingdom: Plantae
- Clade: Tracheophytes
- Clade: Angiosperms
- Clade: Eudicots
- Clade: Rosids
- Order: Fabales
- Family: Fabaceae
- Subfamily: Caesalpinioideae
- Genus: Senna
- Species: S. auriculata

Binomial name
- Senna auriculata (L.) Roxb.

Synonyms
- Cassia auriculata L. Cassia densistipulata Taub.

= Senna auriculata =

Species of legume

Senna auriculata is a leguminous tree in the subfamily Caesalpinioideae. It is commonly known by its local names matura tea tree, avaram or ranawara, (Kannada: ಆವರಿಕೆ āvarike, Marathi: तरवड, Malayalam: ആവര, Sinhala: රණවරා ranawarā,Telugu: తంగేడు taṃgēḍu, Tamil: ஆவாரை āvārai) or the English version avaram senna. It is the State flower of Indian state of Telangana. It occurs in the dry regions of India and Sri Lanka. It is common along the sea coast and the dry zone in Sri Lanka.

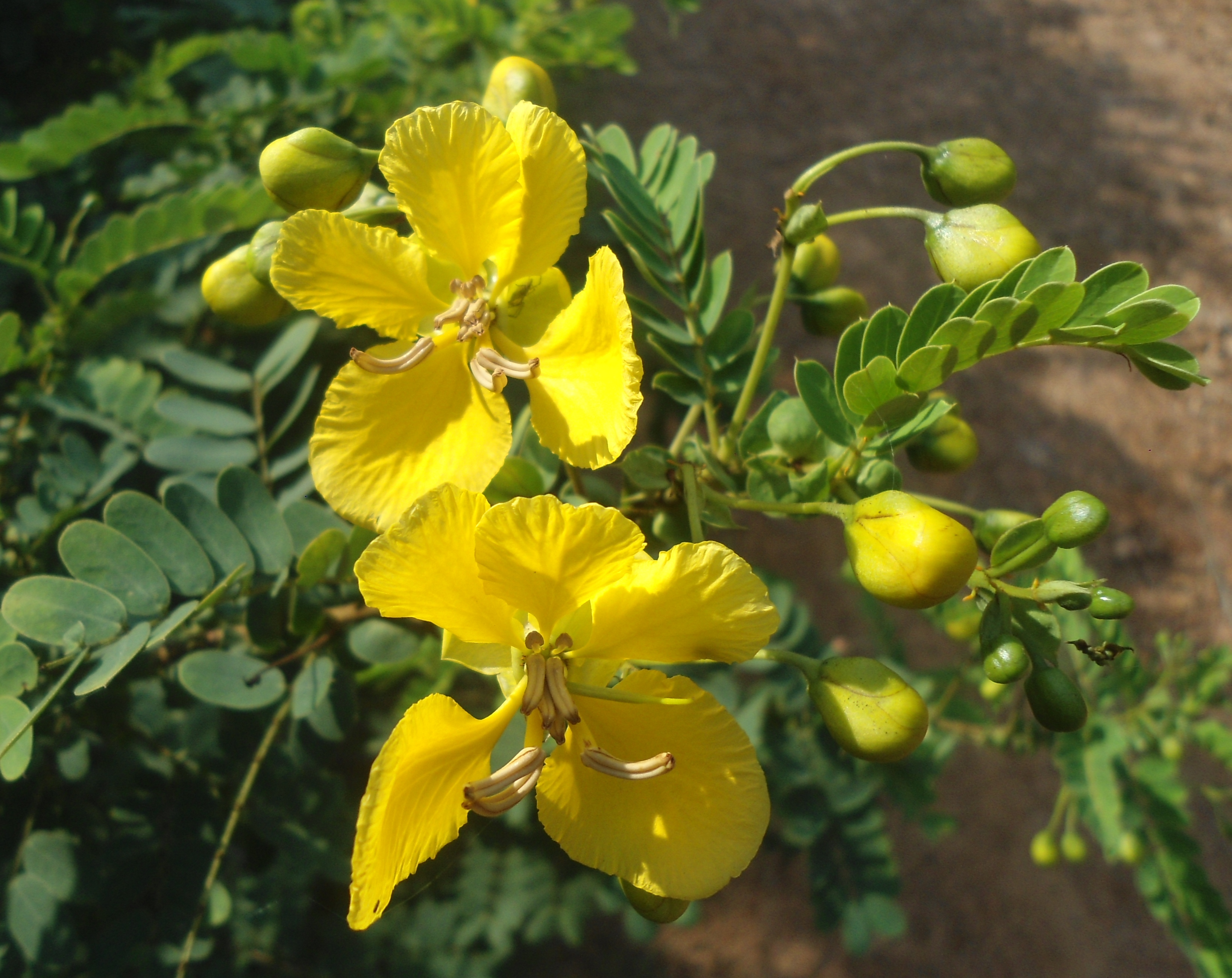
A Senna auriculata shrub

== Description ==
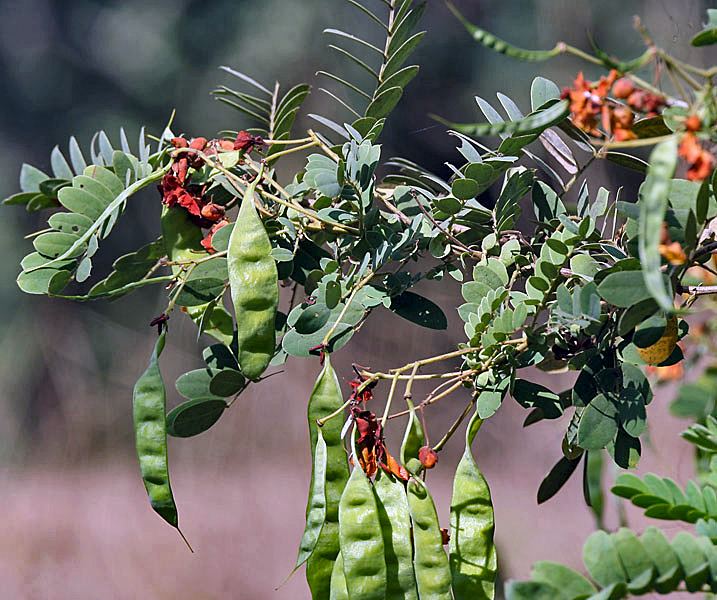
at Sindhrot in Vadodara District of Gujarat, India.

Avaram senna is a much branched shrub with smooth cinnamon brown bark and closely pubescent branchlets.

The leaves are alternate, stipulate, paripinnate compound, very numerous, closely placed, rachis 8.8-12.5 cm long, narrowly furrowed, slender, pubescent, with an erect linear gland between the leaflets of each pair, leaflets 16-24, very shortly stalked 2-2.5 cm long 1-1.3 cm broad, slightly overlapping, oval oblong, obtuse, at both ends, mucronate, glabrous or minutely downy, dull green, paler beneath, stipules very large, reniform-rotund, produced at base on side of next petiole into a filiform point and persistent.

Its flowers are irregular, monoicous, bright yellow and large (nearly 5 cm across), the pedicels glabrous and 2.5 cm long. The racemes are few-flowered, short, erect, crowded in axils of upper leaves so as to form a large terminal inflorescence stamens barren; the ovary is superior, unilocular, with marginal ovules.

The fruit is a short legume, 7.5-11 cm long, 1.5 cm broad, oblong, obtuse, tipped with long style base, flat, thin, papery, undulately crumpled, pilose, pale brown. 12-20 seeds per fruit are carried each in its separate cavity.

== Uses ==
=== Gardens ===
Senna auriculata is suitable for landscaping roadways and home gardens. It tolerates drought and dry conditions, but not much cold. The flowers in racemes are also attractive.

=== Medicinal uses ===
This plant has been reported to treat hyperglycemia and associated hyperlipidemia

This plant is said to contain a cardiac glucoside (sennapicrin) and sap, leaves and bark yield anthraquinones, while the latter contains tannins.

The root is used in decoctions against fevers, diabetes, diseases of urinary system and constipation. The leaves have laxative properties. Tea made from dried flowers and flower buds is consumed by diabetes patients instead of regular tea. It is also believed to improve complexion. Powdered seeds are used against diabetes, they are also applied to the eye to treat chronic purulent conjunctivitis. In Africa, the bark and seeds are said to help against rheumatism, eye diseases, gonorrhea, diabetes, and gout.

This plant has antibacterial properties.

== Footnotes ==
- Dassanayake, M.D. & Fosberg, F.R. (eds.) (1981): A Revised Handbook to the Flora of Ceylon (Vol. II). Smithsonian Institution and National Science Foundation, Washington D.C., Amerind Publishing Co Pvt Ltd, New Delhi.
- de Silva, N. (1998): A selection of indigenous trees for traditional landscapes in Sri Lanka. Deveco Designers and publishers (Pvt) Ltd.
- Jayaweera, D.M.A. (1981a): Medicinal plants (indigenous and exotic) used in Ceylon (Part I). The National Science Council of Sri Lanka, Colombo 7.
- Jayaweera, D.M.A. (1981b): Medicinal plants (indigenous and exotic) used in Ceylon (Part II). The National Science Council of Sri Lanka, Colombo 7.
- Jayaweera, D.M.A. (1981c): Medicinal plants (indigenous and exotic) used in Ceylon (Part III). The National Science Council of Sri Lanka, Colombo 7.
- Jayaweera, D.M.A. (1982): Medicinal plants (indigenous and exotic) used in Ceylon (Part IV). The National Science Council of Sri Lanka, Colombo 7.
- Jayaweera, D.M.A. (1992): Medicinal plants (indigenous and exotic) used in Ceylon (Part V). The National Science Council of Sri Lanka, Colombo 7.
- Martin E.C. (1983): Landscape Plants in Design: A Photographic Guide . AVI Publishing Company, Westport, Connecticut. ISBN 0-87055-429-8
- Perera, D.L. & de Silva, G. (2002): Compendium of Medicinal plants. A Sri Lankan study (Vol. 1+2). Ayurvedic Department, Sri Lanka.
- Rao, P.S.; Venkaiah, K. & Padmaja, R. (1999): Field Guide on Medicinal Plants. Forest Department, Andhra Pradesh, India.
- United States Department of Agriculture (USDA) (2007): USDA Plants Profile: Cassia auriculata. Retrieved 2007-DEC-20.
