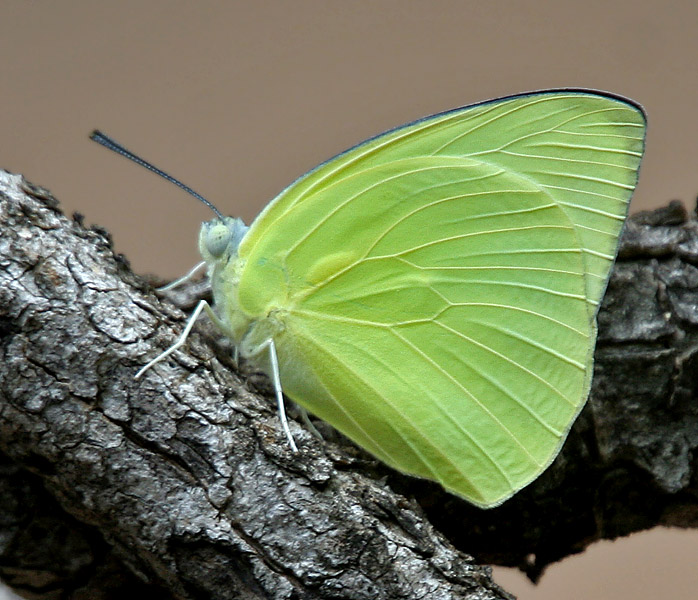
- Male
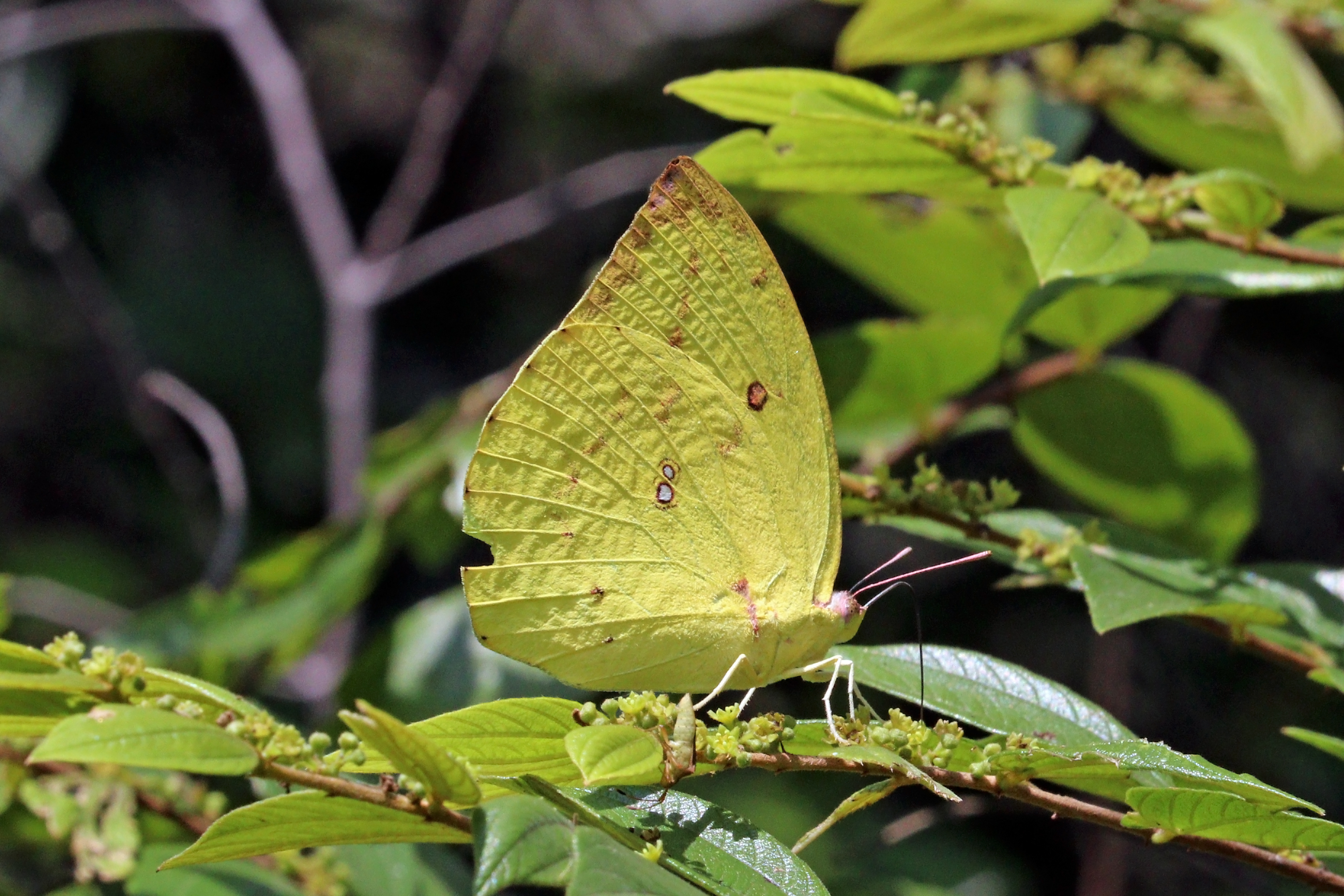
- Female

Scientific classification
- Kingdom: Animalia
- Phylum: Arthropoda
- Class: Insecta
- Order: Lepidoptera
- Family: Pieridae
- Genus: Catopsilia
- Species: C. pomona

Binomial name
- Catopsilia pomona (Fabricius, 1775)

Synonyms
- Catopsila crocale

= Catopsilia pomona =

Species of butterfly

Catopsilia pomona, the common emigrant or lemon emigrant, is a medium-sized pierid butterfly found in Asia and parts of Australia. The species gets its name from its habit of migration. Some early authors considered them as two distinct species Catopsilia crocale and Catopsilia pomona.

== Description ==
The species has pale and dark morphs in Australia. The form crocale has the antennae black and the form pomona has the antennae pinkish or red. The development of these forms has been linked to photoperiod and temperature during growth.

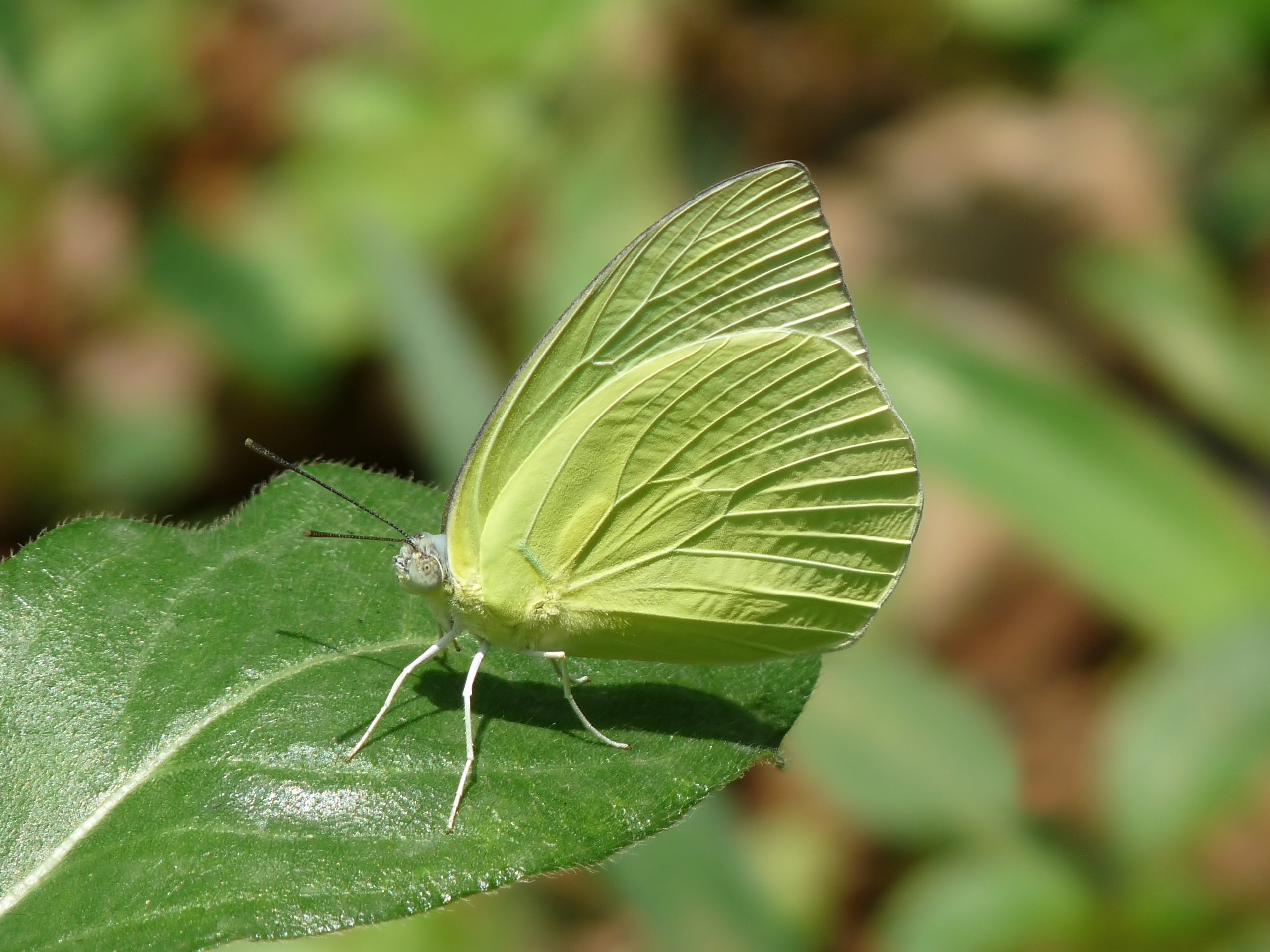
Catopsilia pomona 'crocale' male f. alcmeone in Kerala, India

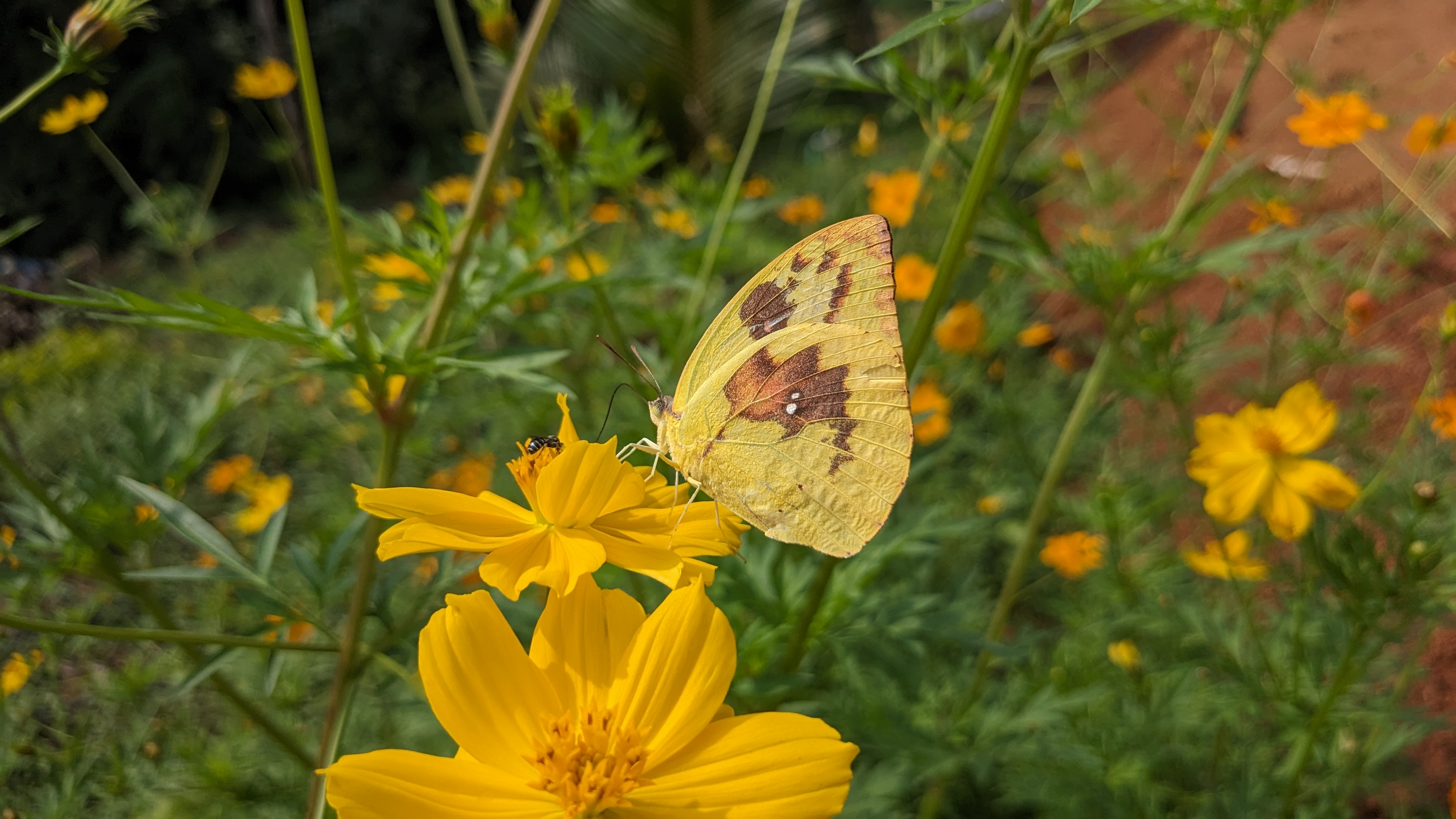
Form Catilla

=== Male ===
Quoted from Bingham, C. T. (1907) The Fauna of British India, Including Ceylon and Burma: Butterflies volume 2.

"The upperside of the male is chalky-white, sometimes with a more or less broad and clearly defined basal sulphur-yellow area on both fore and hind wings; this sulphur-yellow colour is at times diffused over the whole surface of the wings, though generally it becomes paler towards the terminal margins. For the fore wing, the whole, or sometimes only the apical half, of the costa narrowly black, this color widened out irregularly at the apex; termen widely black at the apex, the colour narrowed posteriorly. This border in some specimens almost reaches the tornus, in others terminates above vein 4; occasionally it is continued posteriorly by a series of block dots at the apices of the veins. Hind wing: generally uniform, unmarked, some specimens bear minute black dots at the apices of the veins.

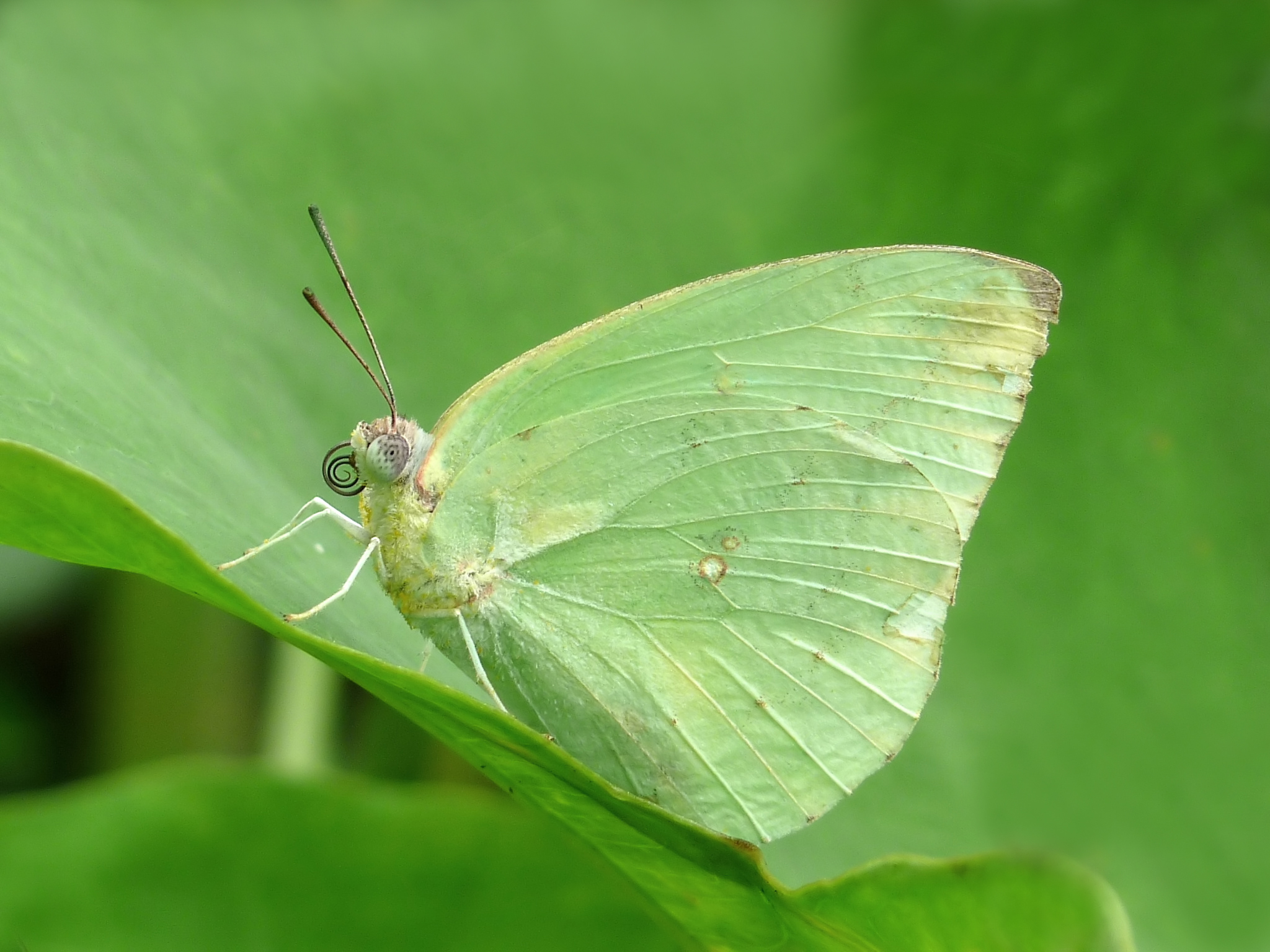
Catopsilia pomona 'pomona' male f. hilaria in Kerala, India

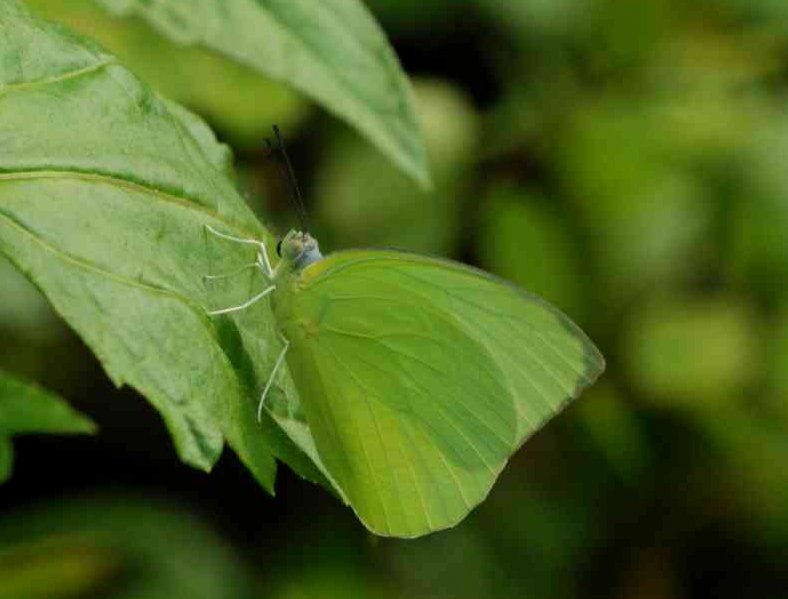
In Kolkata, West Bengal, India

"On the underside the groundcolour is very variable, with white with a slight to strong ochraceous tinge, greenish white or sulphur-yellow. The fore wing is typically without markings, in some specimens with a patch of sulphur-yellow on either side of base of median nervure, in the very yellow examples the tornal area is often widely greenish white, in others (Catopsilia catilla, Cramer) it bears a spot variable in size on the discocellulars. This spot has a pearly centre and an outer reddish line. Many specimens have an irregular angulated narrow discal reddish line (the colour varies in intensity) that runs from the costa obliquely outwards to vein 7, and then obliquely inwards to vein 2, though this line is often absent in specimens that bear the discocellular spot; apex and termen sometimes very narrowly reddish. The hind wing is typically uniform, without markings; in var. catilla there is a single small spot at the end of the cell similar to that on the fore wing, sometimes this spot is much larger with a narrow outer reddish ring, sometimes it is accompanied by a similar spot at base of interspace 5; when two spots are present they may be entirely separate, or their outer rings may coalesce; again, some specimens have a highly irregular discal reddish line (often reduced to a series of minute spots) that extends from the costa to vein 1; finally, the majority of specimens have a series of minute red terminal dots at the apices of the veins."

=== Female ===
Quoted from Bingham, C. T. (1907) The Fauna of British India, Including Ceylon and Burma: Butterflies volume 2.

"On the female upperside the ground-color varies as in the male, but sometimes it is chalky white at the bases of the wings, with the terminal margins more or less broadly sulphur-yellow. Fore wings always with a round, occasionally quadrate, black discocellular spot variable in size; in some specimens the costa is black only towards the apex of the wing, in others broadly black throughout and opposite the apex of cell so widened out as to touch the discocellular spot. In lightly marked specimens in addition to the discocellular spot, there is only an irregular terminal black band dentate inwardly and widest at the apex of the wing; in others there is in addition a more or less diffuse highly curved macular postdiscal band that extends from the costa obliquely outwards down to vein 7, where it often touches the terminal black band, and thence is continued downward and slightly inclined inwards to interspace 1, getting gradually paler and fainter posteriorly. Hind wing: a series of terminal inter-spacial [sic] black spots that vary in size, and in the dark forms coalesce into a terminal black band."

"The underside varies from white with a light yellowish sometimes ochraeeous tinge to deep chrome-yellow; markings as in the male but still more variable; in var. catilla the spot at the apex of the cell in both fore and hind wings is enlarged into a large reddish blotch, the similar spot on the hind wing is sometimes so enlarged as to occupy the apex of the cell, the basal two-thirds of interspaces 4, 5, and 6, and the middle third of interspace 7; in some specimens it is continued posteriorly in a series of obscure lunules to interspace 1a. Antennae red, obscurely dotted with black, palpi and head above red, thorax clothed with long yellow, sometimes greenish hairs, abdomen pale yellow; beneath: palpi and thorax pale to dark yellow, abdomen white."

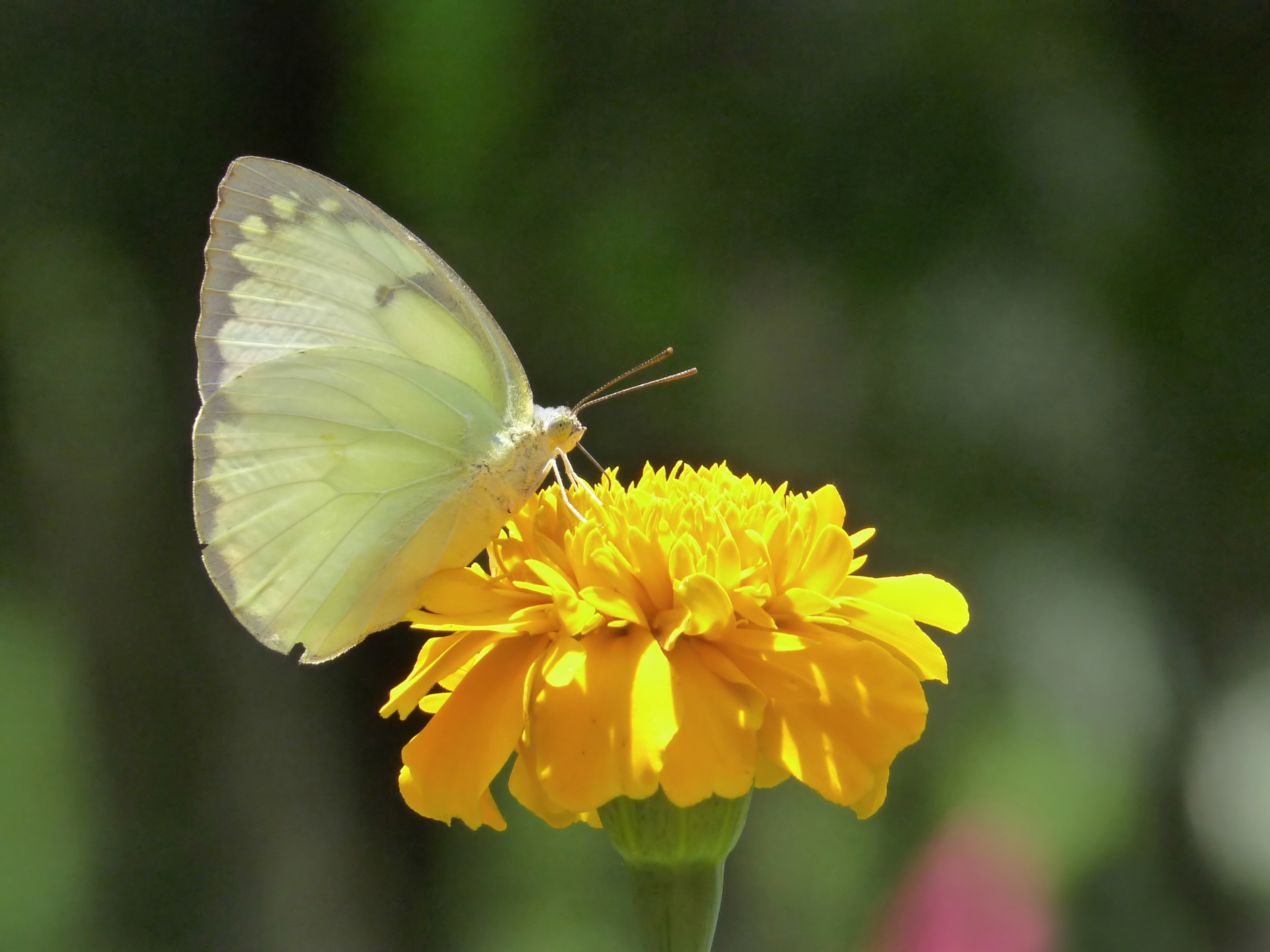
Catopsilia pomona 'crocale' female f. jugurtha in Kerala, India

== Life cycle ==
=== Egg ===
The eggs of the butterfly are laid on various species of plants including several Cassias. Other host plants include Butea monosperma, Cassia fistula, Bauhinia species, Pterocarpus indicus, Senna alata and Sesbania species. The eggs are usually laid singly on the underside, at the margin of the leaves. Each egg is white, bottle shaped, and ribbed vertically. The eggs hatch in 3–4 days.

=== Caterpillar (larva) ===
The newly hatched caterpillar is about 0.5 cm long and is yellowish green. In later instars the colour changes to a leafy green. The head is green and spotted with tiny black tubercules. The spiracles are covered with a continuous white line. Each segment of the body bears tiny shiny black tubercules. The tubercules immediately above the spiracular line being larger and more distinct giving the effect of a black line over the white spiracular line. The paired lines are found on both sides of the body and run from head to anus. The similar Catopsilia pyranthe caterpillar has a much broader black line leaving only a narrow green line on the back of the body.

The larva is described by Thomas Reid Davys Bell as "The head is round, green, the clypeus edged with brown, covered with small shiny black tubercles which... do not hide the colour of the head; the anal flap is rounded, but looks square at the extremity, and is covered with rows of small black tubercles... of which only the row along the spiracular line is conspicuous. The spiracles are oval, shiny and white. The colour is green with a spiracular white band touched with bright yellow on segments 2-5, and these segments, especially 3 and 4, are distinctly flanged on the spiracular line. Length 51 mm.

=== Chrysalis (pupa) ===
Pupation takes place low to the ground. The pupa is suspended by a silken body band and attached to the substrate by a black cremaster. Its entire body is bright leaf green. A continuous yellow runs from the cremaster to the head, the head ending in a snout. In the similar Catopsilia pyranthe the snout is short. The pupa is described by Bell as "The pupa has the dorsal line of the thorax absolutely parallel to the longitudinal axis of the pupa for two-thirds of its length, consequently the hinder part just before the margin is perpendicular to this part, it is raised suddenly but very slightly above the front margin of segment 4, and the front end of this parallel dorsal line is at an angle, and a sharpish angle, with the front slope of the thorax .... the cremaster is distinctly bifid at the extremity, and has some shiny, very stout, black, suspensory hooks dorsally as well as at the extremity. There is a dorsal rugose black tip to the snout terminating the head, which snout is cylindrical in its apical half; there is no black line round the eye and there is a dark green-blue dorsal line which is yellow on the thorax as well as the supra-spiracular yellow line. Length 34 mm; length of snout 3 mm; breadth at segment 7 is 9 mm; height at apex of curve of wing (segment 6) 10 mm; height at apen of thorax 8 mm".

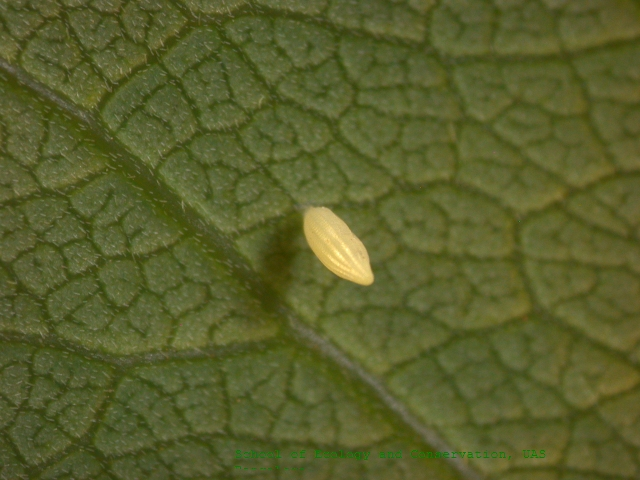
Egg

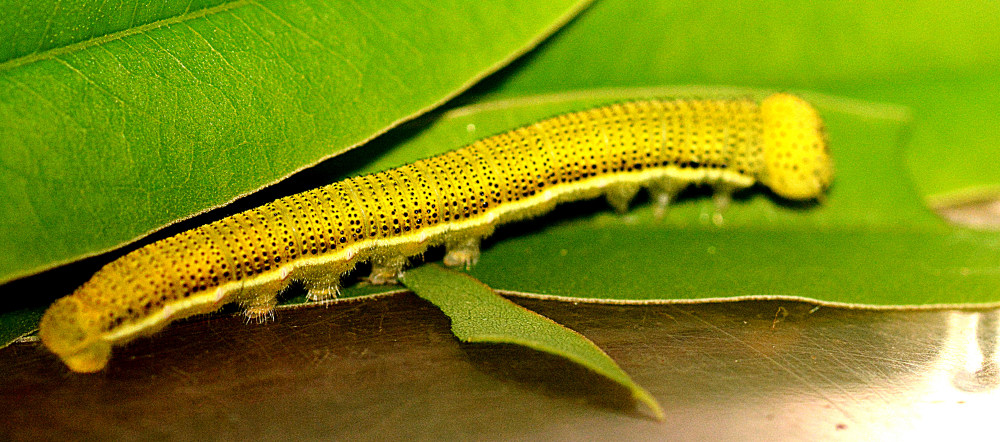
Caterpillar, 3rd instar

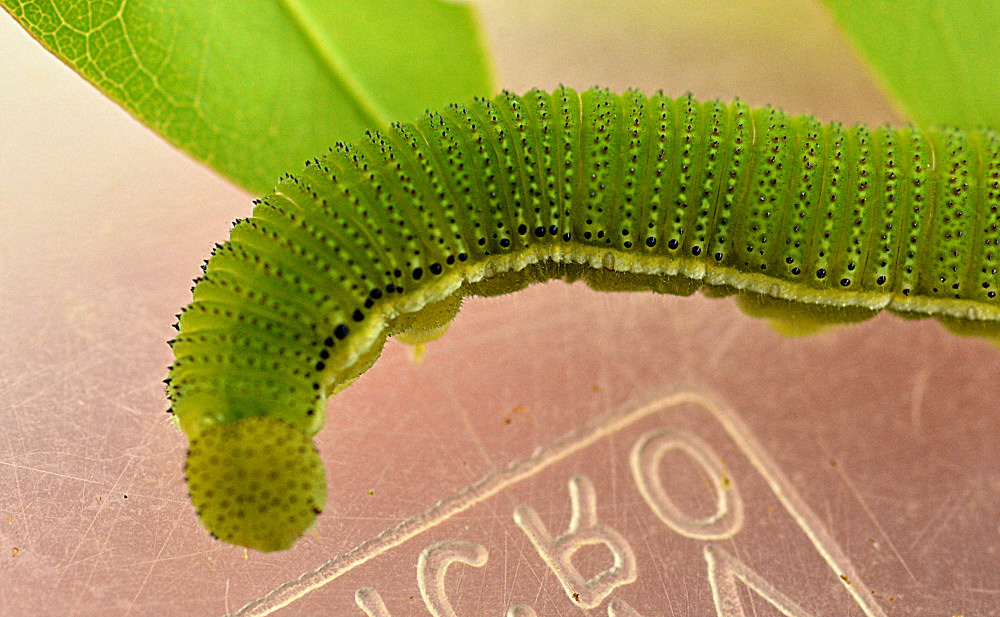
Caterpillar, 4th instar

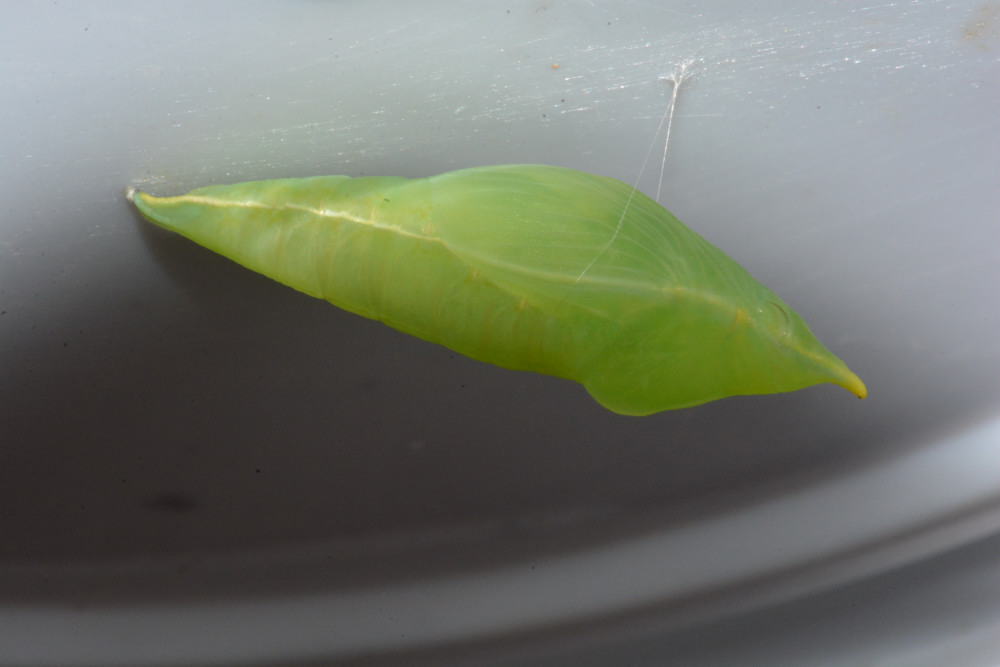
Pupa

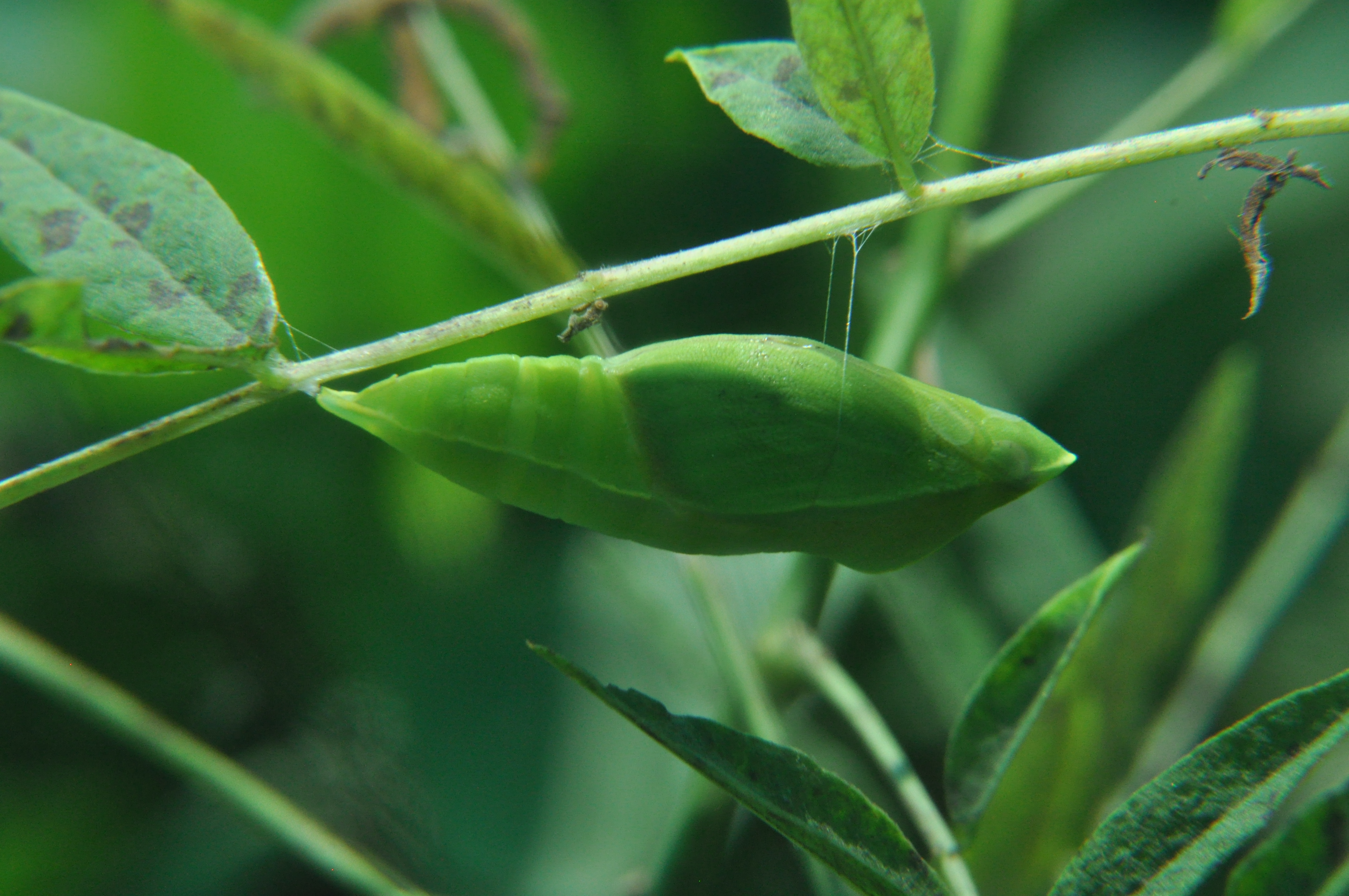
Pupa in the upper edge of Cassia leaf

== See also ==
- List of butterflies of India (Pieridae)
