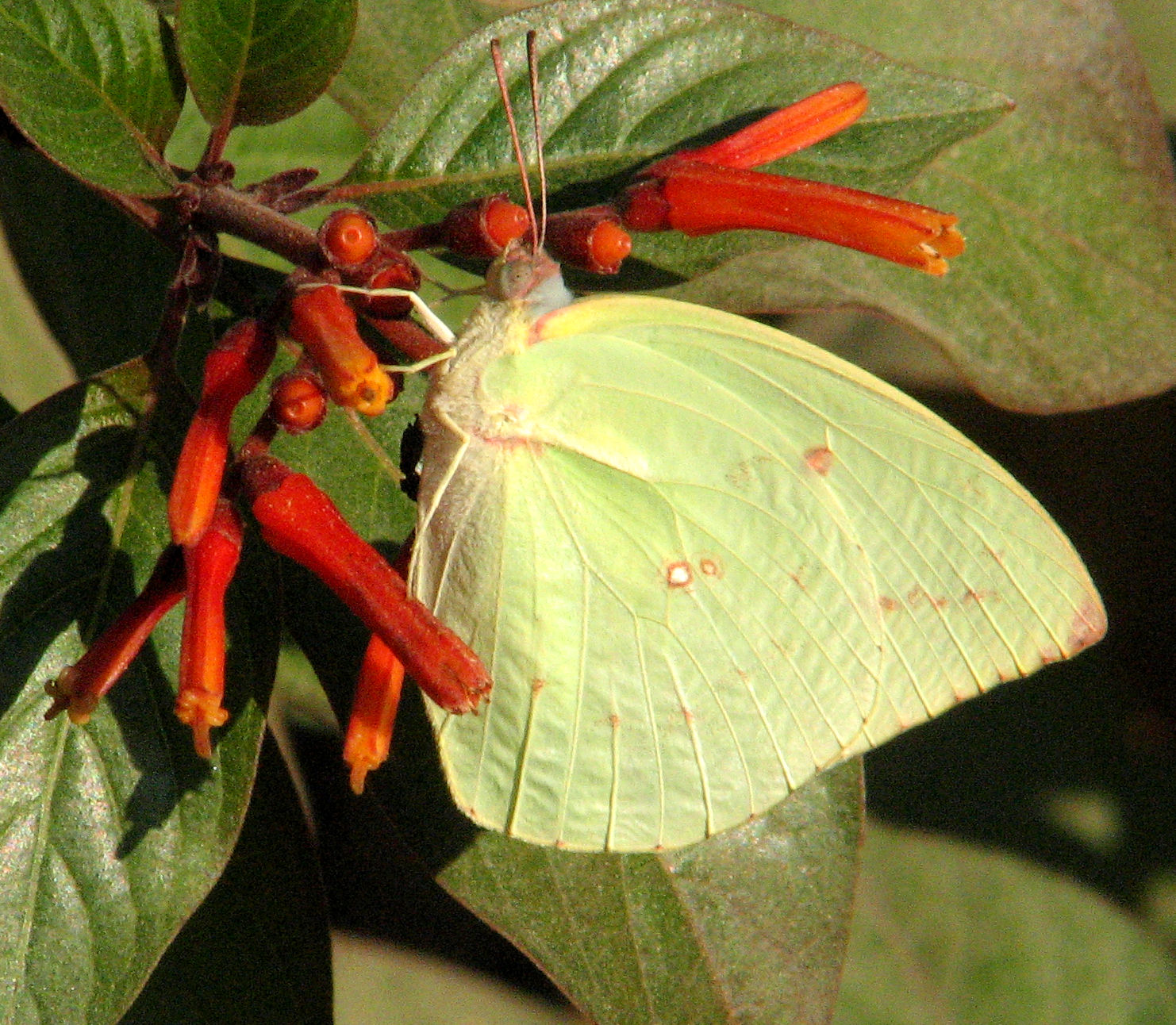
- Common emigrant, Jaipur, India

Scientific classification
- Kingdom: Animalia
- Phylum: Arthropoda
- Clade: Pancrustacea
- Class: Insecta
- Order: Lepidoptera
- Family: Pieridae
- Tribe: Coliadini
- Genus: Catopsilia; Hübner, [1819]

Species
- See text

Synonyms
- Murtia Hübner, [1819]

= Catopsilia =

Genus of butterflies

Catopsilia is a genus of butterflies in the family Pieridae, commonly called migrants or emigrants.

== Species ==
Ordered alphabetically.

- Catopsilia florella (Fabricius, 1775) – African emigrant, African migrant, or common vagrant
- Catopsilia gorgophone (Boisduval, 1836) – yellow migrant
- Catopsilia pomona (Fabricius, 1775) – common emigrant or lemon emigrant
- Catopsilia pyranthe (Linnaeus, 1758) – mottled emigrant or white migrant
- Catopsilia scylla (Linnaeus, 1763) – orange emigrant or orange migrant
- Catopsilia thauruma (Reakirt, 1866) – Madagascar migrant
