= Margaret Legum =

British activist

Margaret Jean Roberts Legum
- Born: 8 October 1933; Pretoria, South Africa
- Died: 1 November 200; Cape Town
- Education: Rhodes University Newnham College
- Occupation: Activist Social reformer
- Spouse: Colin Legum
- Children: 3

Margaret Jean Roberts Legum (8 October 1933, Pretoria, South Africa – 1 November 2007, Cape Town, South Africa) was a South African/British anti-apartheid activist and social reformer, who specialized in economics.

Legum attended Rhodes University and Newnham College where she studied economics. Legum married Colin Legum in 1960 and they moved to London.

Margaret Legum died in 2007, aged 74, from cancer.

== Works ==
Legum was a founder of the South African New Economics Network. Her book, It Doesn't Have To Be Like This: Global Economics – A New Way Forward (2003), was written based on a series of lectures she gave at the University of Cape Town.

She was well known for a 1963 book on the necessity of economic sanctions against South Africa, South Africa: Crisis for the West, which she co-wrote with her husband, Colin.
