= Colin Legum =

South African activist and journalist (1919–2003)

- Legum, pictured c.1965
- Born: 3 January 1919; Kestell, Orange Free State, Union of South Africa
- Died: 8 June 2003 (aged 84); Kalk Bay, Western Cape, South Africa
- Occupations: Journalist and writer
- Spouses: Eugenie Leon (m. 1941–1960) Margaret Roberts (m. 1960)

Colin Legum (3 January 1919 – 8 June 2003) was a South African journalist and writer on African politics. A popular author, he authored several popular books and worked for most of his career at The Observer in the United Kingdom. He was a notable Anti-Apartheid activist and did much to popularise African history and current affairs for a British audience.

== Biography ==
=== South Africa, 1919–49 ===
Colin Legum was born on 3 January 1919 in the rural settlement of Kestell in the Orange Free State, South Africa. His parents were Lithuanian-Jewish immigrants who ran a small hotel. He was brought up by a Sotho nurse and "felt deeply about the injustice of the treatment of the local black population" as well as the poverty among the local whites. Although strongly attached to South Africa, he was politically sympathetic to Zionism.

Legum was educated at Kestell's Retief High School. In 1934 immediately after finishing at age 15 he left for Johannesburg, finding a job as an office boy at the Sunday Express, where was its political reporter, by the time he was 19 He joined the South African Labour Party and became the editor of its newspapers Forward and The Mineworker, eventually becoming party general secretary. He was elected to Johannesburg City Council in 1942 where he was responsible for housing. He married Eugenie (née Leon) in 1941.

=== United Kingdom and the Observer, 1949–91 ===
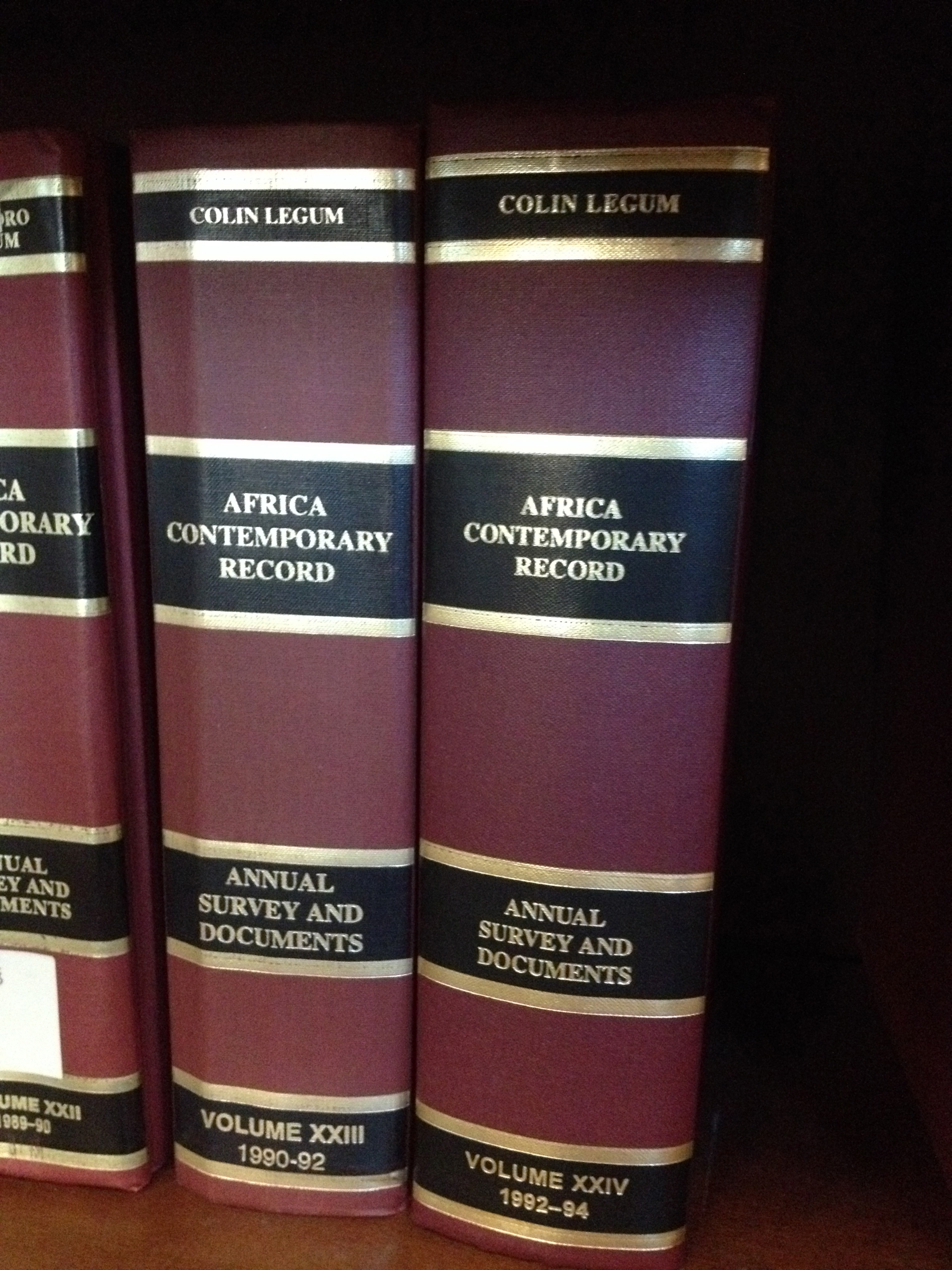
The Africa Contemporary Record, established by Legum in 1968

Legum left South Africa for the United Kingdom in 1949 as the newly ascendant National Party of D. F. Malan began to construct the Apartheid system of racial segregation. In London Legum gained a prestigious post at The Observer through personal contact with David Astor, its editor, who, like Legum, opposed South African policy. Legum became one of the first British journalists specifically focusing on African issues and remained with The Observer for most of his career, eventually becoming the paper's associate editor.

As a journalist, Legum remained involved in South African political issues. He became part of the Africa Bureau run by Michael Scott and Mary Benson, which campaigned for reform in South Africa. Along with Scott and other activists, he co-authored his first book, Attitude to Africa, in 1952. He subsequently wrote numerous popular works on contemporary African subjects during the era of decolonisation, including Congo Disaster (1961) and Pan-Africanism: A Brief History (1962). He became friends with several leading African nationalist leaders, notably Julius Nyerere, Seretse Khama, and Oliver Tambo.

Legum married the economist Margaret Legum (née Roberts) in 1960 after the death of his first wife. They co-authored South Africa: Crisis for the West (1964), which was the first call for economic sanctions against Apartheid South Africa. He was banned from South Africa in 1962 and later from Rhodesia. He established the annual Africa Contemporary Record in 1968. His last book was Africa Since Independence (1991).

=== South Africa, 1996–2003 ===
With the collapse of the Apartheid state, Legum returned to South Africa in 1996 and settled in Kalk Bay, near Cape Town. He received honorary degrees from Rhodes University and the University of South Africa. In 2002 he founded the Dr Colin Legum Development Trust to provide scholarships at Retief High School. He died on 8 June 2003, aged 84.
