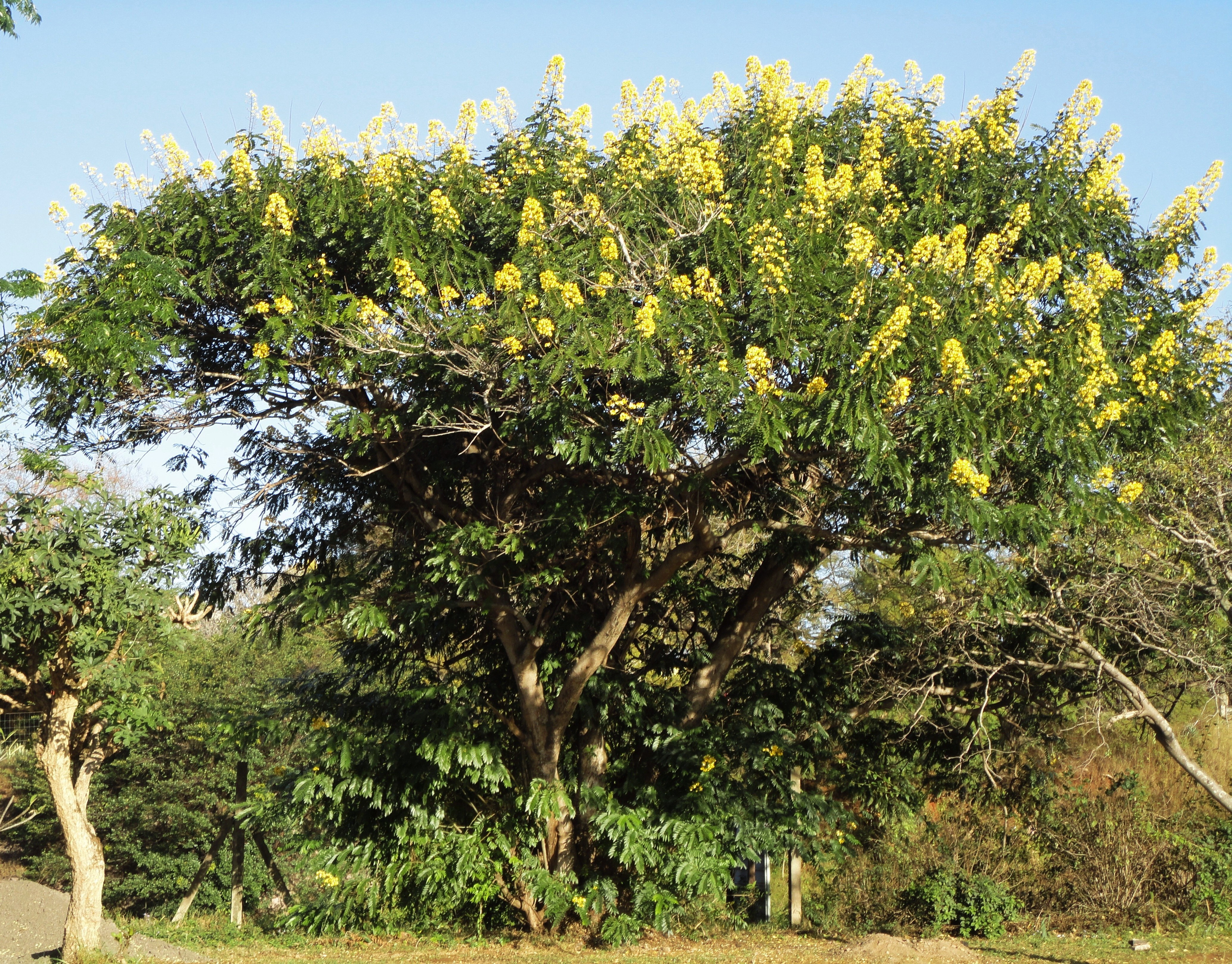
- Senna petersiana in South Africa

Scientific classification
- Kingdom: Plantae
- Clade: Tracheophytes
- Clade: Angiosperms
- Clade: Eudicots
- Clade: Rosids
- Order: Fabales
- Family: Fabaceae
- Subfamily: Caesalpinioideae
- Genus: Senna
- Species: S. petersiana

Binomial name
- Senna petersiana (Bolle) Lock

Synonyms
- Cassia petersiana Bolle

= Senna petersiana =

Species of legume

Senna petersiana, the monkey pod or eared senna, is an African deciduous shrub or small tree. The leaves are compound with about 12 opposite lanceolate leaflets, dark green above and lighter below. Its copious bright yellow flowers are carried on erect multi-branched inflorescences. The species was formerly placed in the genus Cassia.

It occurs naturally in Cameroon, Central African Republic, DRC, South Sudan, Ethiopia, Kenya, Tanzania, Mozambique, Zimbabwe, South Africa and Eswatini. It was introduced to several Indian Ocean islands and became naturalized in far northern Madagascar.

There are little to no animals containing it in their diet, however it is beneficial in medicine for treating constipation, intestinal worms and possibly diabetes. It is also thought to help fight against MCF-7 Cancer cells.
