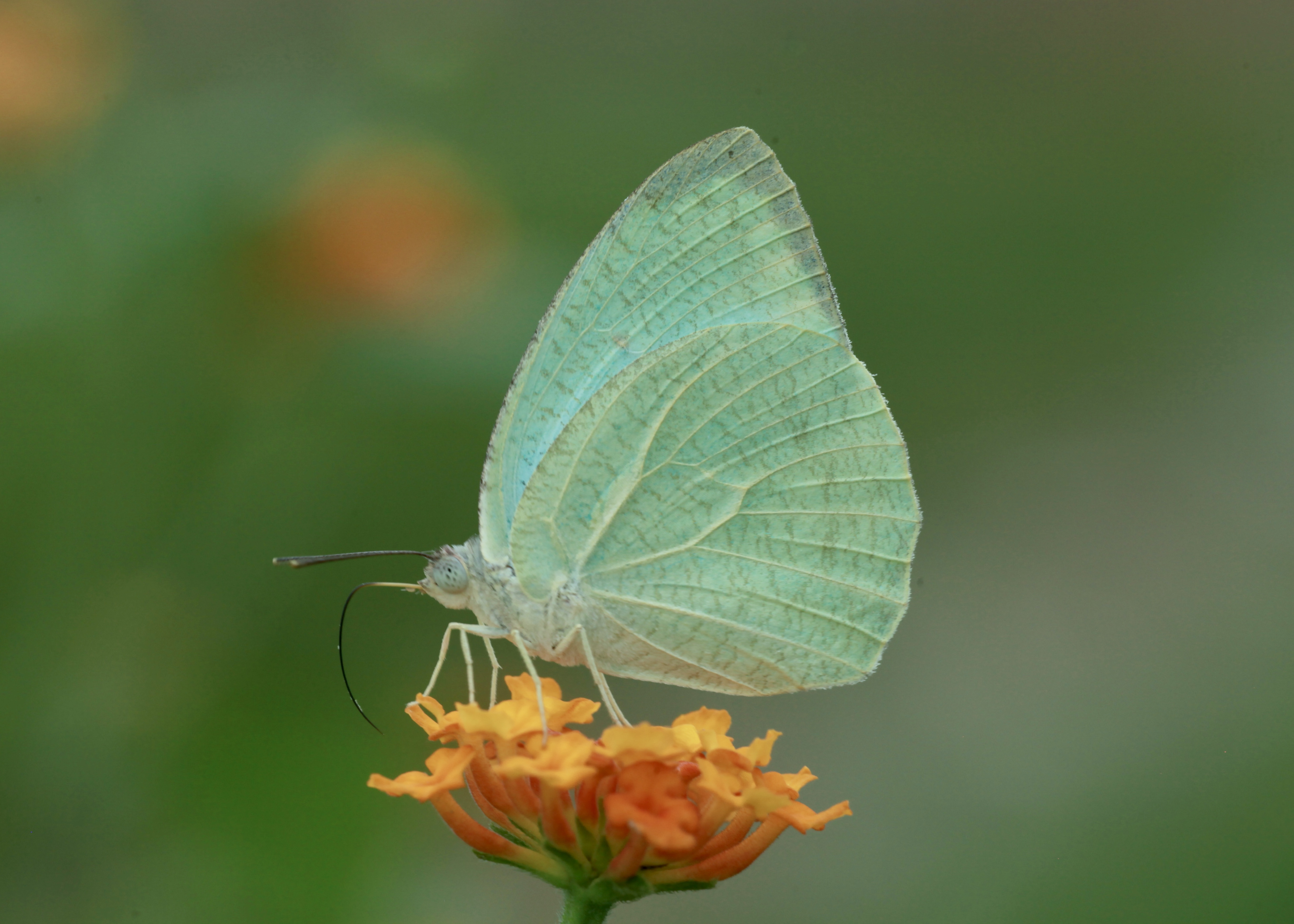
- Male from Nanakmatta, Uttarakhand, India
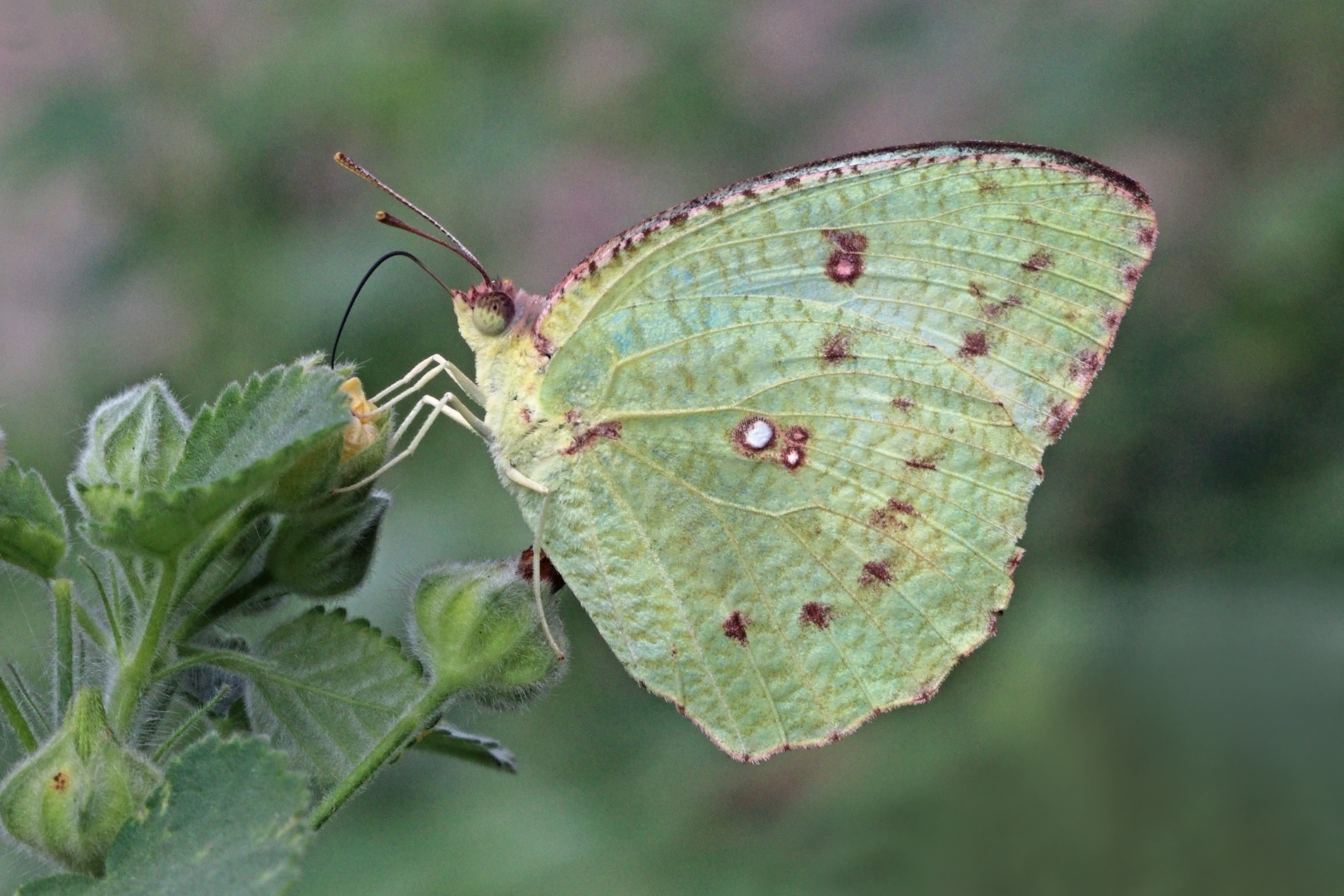
- Female from Nayagarh, Odisha, India

Scientific classification
- Kingdom: Animalia
- Phylum: Arthropoda
- Class: Insecta
- Order: Lepidoptera
- Family: Pieridae
- Genus: Catopsilia
- Species: C. pyranthe

Binomial name
- Catopsilia pyranthe (Linnaeus, 1758)

= Catopsilia pyranthe =

Mottled emigrant

Species of butterfly

Catopsilia pyranthe, the mottled emigrant, is a medium-sized butterfly of the family Pieridae found in south Asia, southeast Asia, and parts of Australia.

== Description ==
=== Male ===
The upperside is chalky white, slightly tinted in some specimens with green. The forewing is with or without a discocellular black spot, that varies in size; costa and termen sometimes without a black margin; occasionally the costa has its apical third narrowly black, broadened slightly at the apex with black spots between the anterior veins; or again, the costa may be narrowly black, the apex very broadly so, and this colour continued down the termen but narrowed posteriorly. The hindwing is sometimes immaculate, but generally with narrow terminal black spots at the apices of the veins, these often reduced to mere dots, or again so broadened as to coalesce into a narrow terminal black margin.

The underside's ground colour is similar, suffused on the anterior half of the forewing and over the whole surface of the hindwing with a greenish tint that varies to an ochraceous yellow, and, except in the very palest specimens, is evenly irrorated (sprinkled) over the greenish or ochraceous-tinted areas with transverse, short, reddish-brown strigae; both forewings and hindwings with generally an obscure discocellular reddish-brown spot or indication thereof.

=== Female ===
The upperside is as in the male, but sometimes with a suffusion of pale greenish yellow on the terminal third or fourth only of both forewings and hindwings, rarely of that tint throughout. The forewing is always with a discocellular black spot that varies very much in size; costa sometimes narrowly black with the basal half pinkish, in other specimens narrowly black throughout, the black broadened at the apex and continued along the anterior half of the termen in a series of inwardly-pointed black spots; or again, the costa may be more broadly black, that colour widened considerably at the apex and continued broadly down the termen to vein 3, then suddenly narrowed to a slender line at the tornus. In most specimens there is an anterior postdiscal short black macular baud; in the dark forms this coalesce with the black on apex and termen. The hindwing is sometimes immaculate, sometimes with a series of terminal spots at the apices of the veins, sometimes with a narrow dusky-black terminal band broadest near the apex, narrowed posteriorly to a slender line at the tornus. In the very dark specimens there is in addition an ill-defined, short anterior postdiscal macular black band.

The underside is as in the male, with similar variations, but in addition in most specimens the discocellular spots are well defined with an outer red ring that encircles a silvery spot; on the hindwing one or two similar spots on each side of the discocellulars; generally also both wings are crossed by a transverse postdiscal line of minute red spots, which on the forewing is confined to the anterior portion, on the hindwing is nearly complete. In both sexes: antennae reddish, head and thorax anteriorly brown, thorax clothed posteriorly with long white hairs, abdomen white: beneath: the palpi, thorax, and abdomen white.

== Life history ==
The host plants of the species include Cassia species (e.g., C. fistula; C. javanica or C. roxburghii; C. bakeriana), Gnidia glauca, Senna occidentalisSenna species (e.g. S. alata; S. auriculata; S. garrettiana), Crotalaria species, Ormocarpum cochinchinense, Sesbania species and Colocasia.

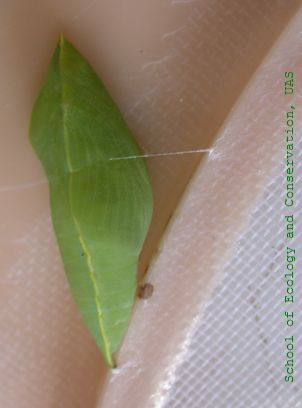
Pupa

The development period from egg to adult is 22 to 29 days allowing up to 11-12 generations a year.

Larva: "Long, somewhat depressed, rough, green, with a white lateral line and above it a black line more or less conspicuous, formed by minute black shining tubercles. In short, this larva in very like a big specimen of a Eurema hecabe".

Pupa: "Much stouter (i.e. than that of Eurema hecabe, and the keel formed by the wing-cases much less pronounced. The normal colour is pale green with a yellow lateral line. We have never found it on any plant except Senna occidentalis. It habitually rests on the upperside along the midrib, like almost all Pierine larvae." Davidson and Aitken, quoted in Bingham.

== Larval host plants ==
- Senna auriculata
- Cassia fistula
- Cassia javanica
- Senna tora
- Ormocarpum cochinchinense
- Senna obtusifolia
- Senna occidentalis
- Senna sophera
- Senna sulfurea
- Sesbania sp.
- Sesbania bispinosa
- Sesbania grandiflora
- Sesbania sesban
- Gnidia glauca

== Range ==
India, Myanmar, Bangladesh, Malaya and New Guinea.

== Gallery ==
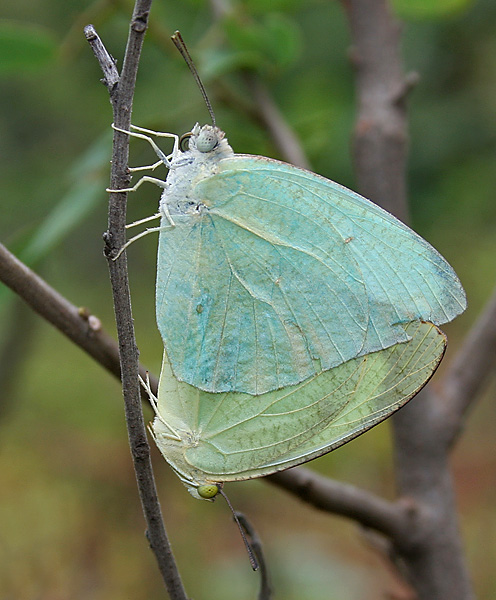
Mating in Hyderabad, India

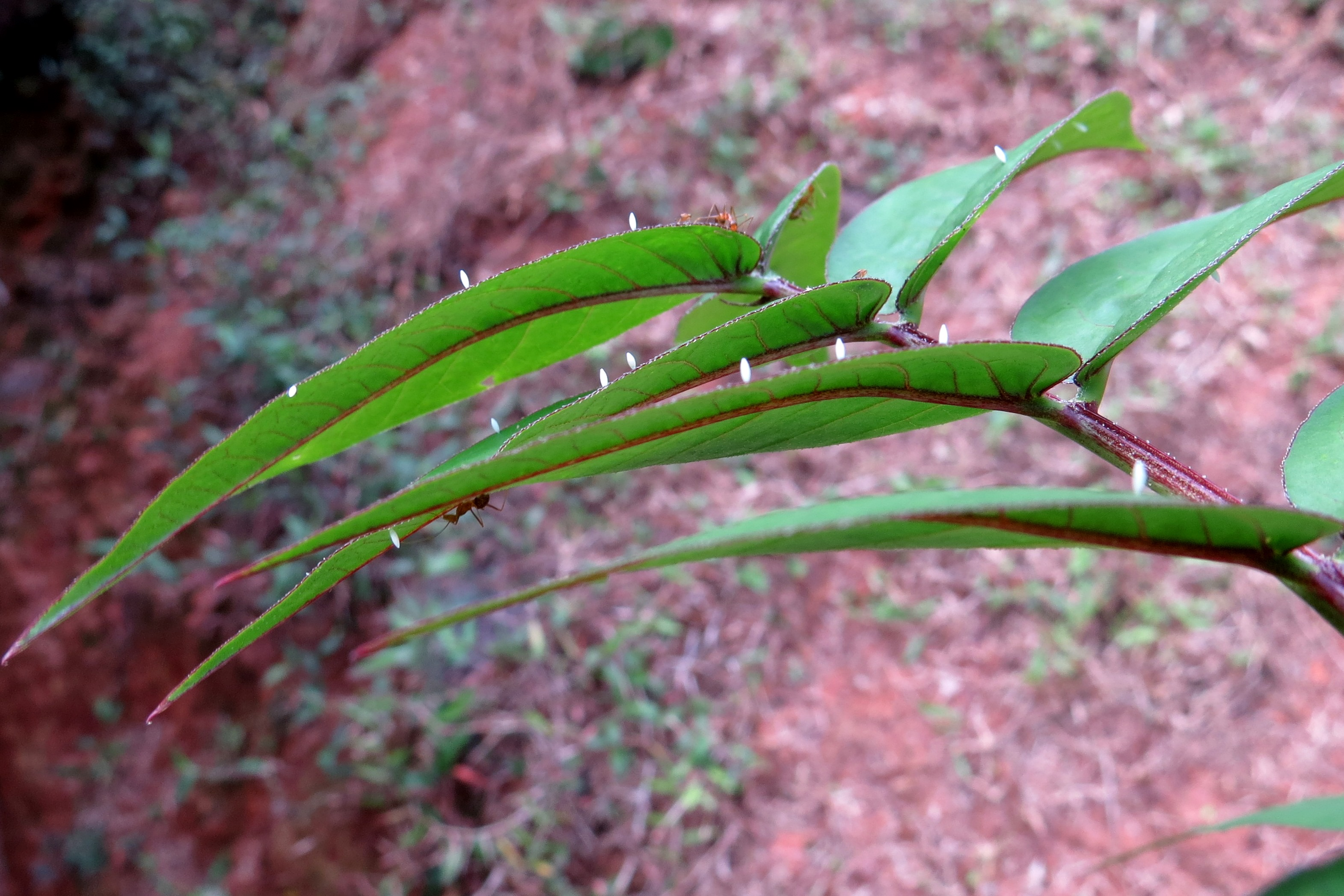
Eggs on Senna occidentalis

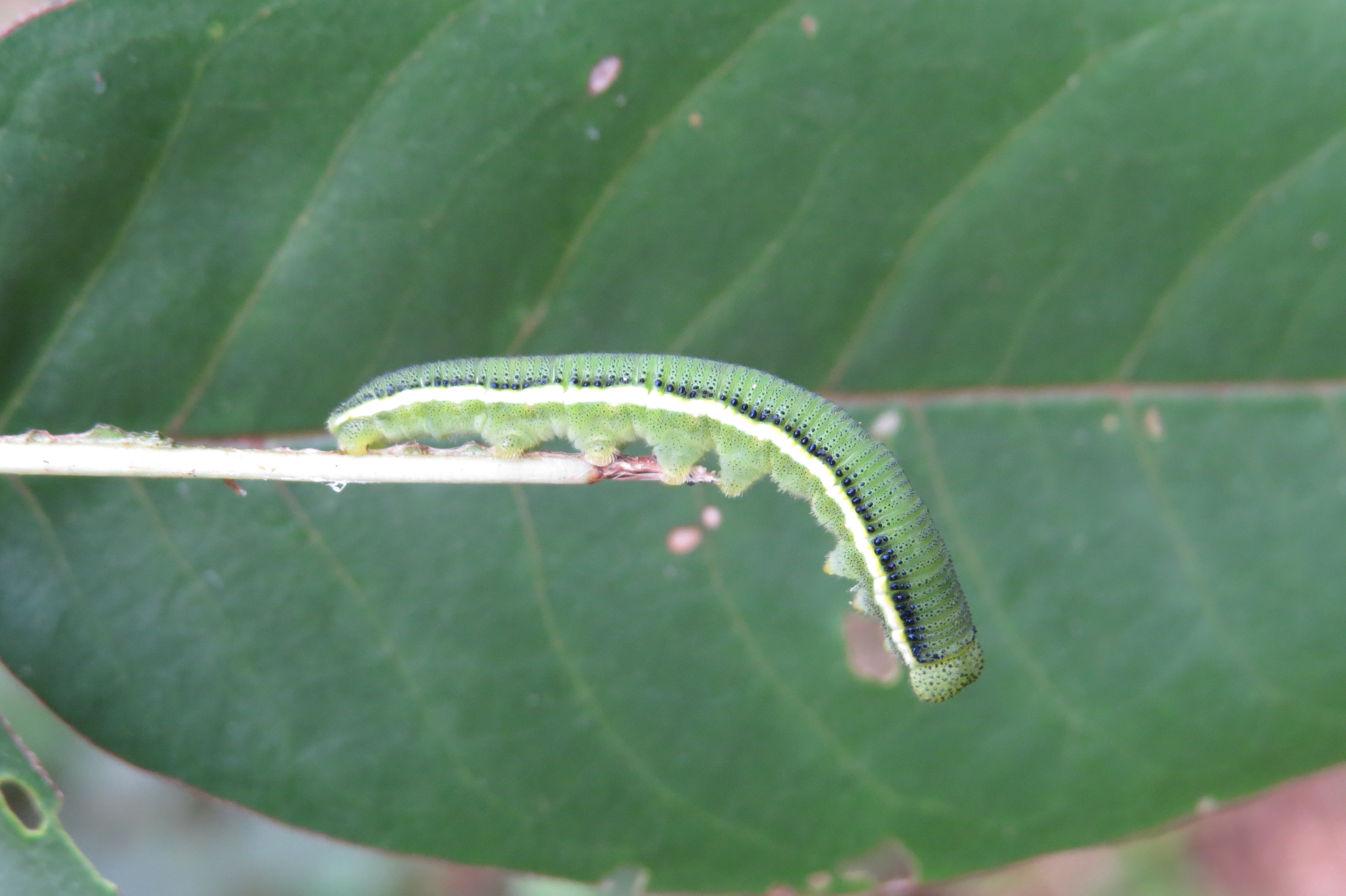
Caterpillar

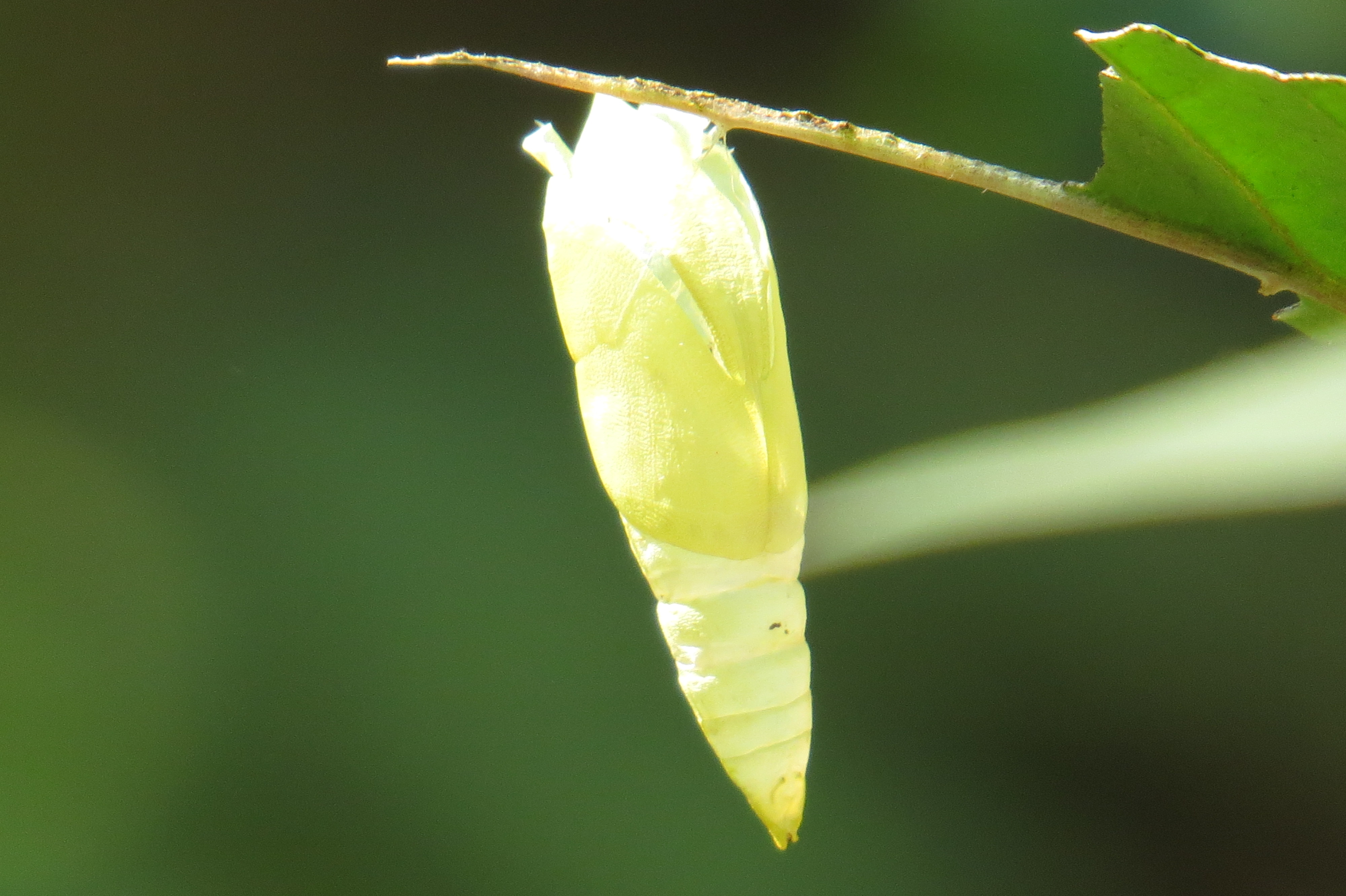
Empty Pupal case

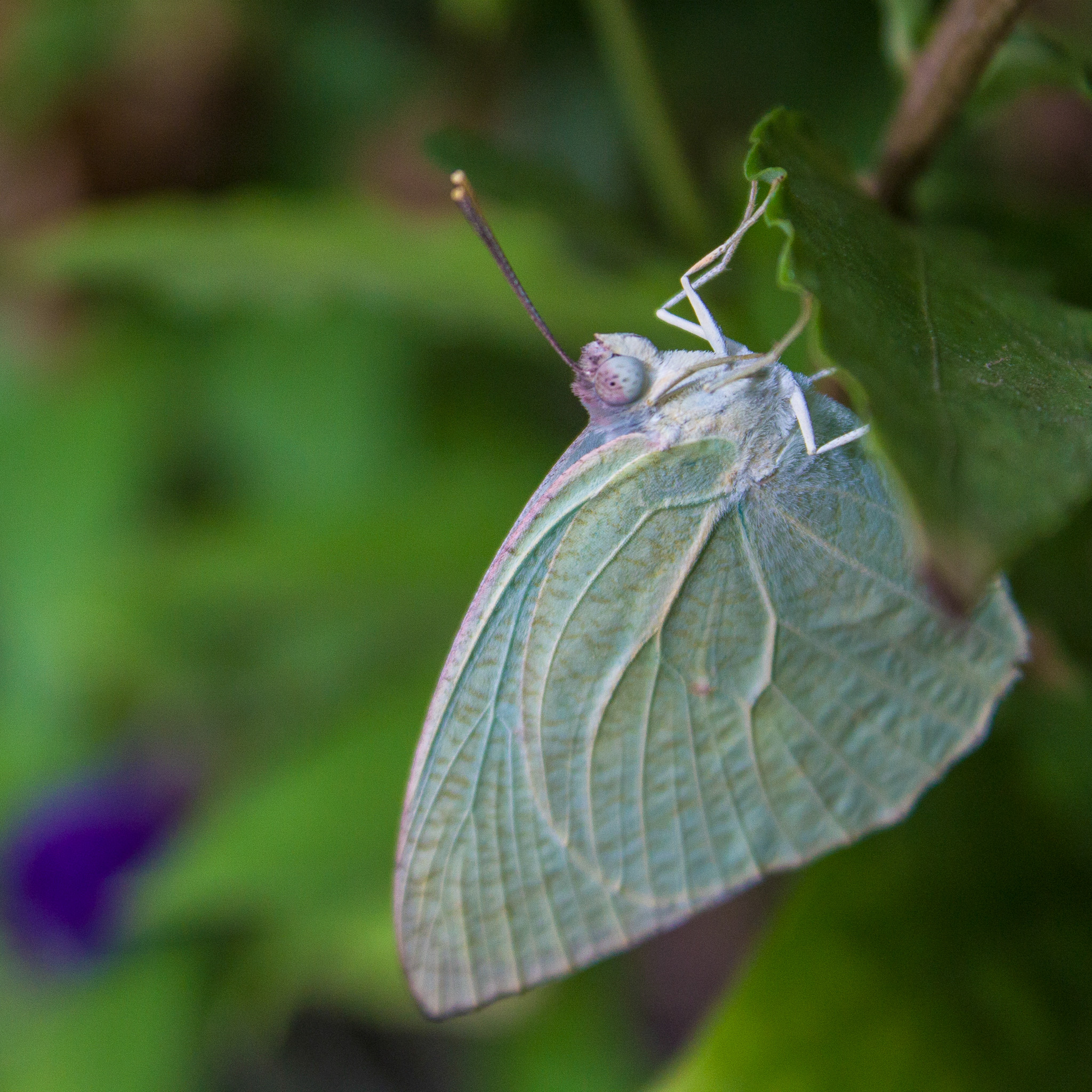
Close up | Sri Lanka

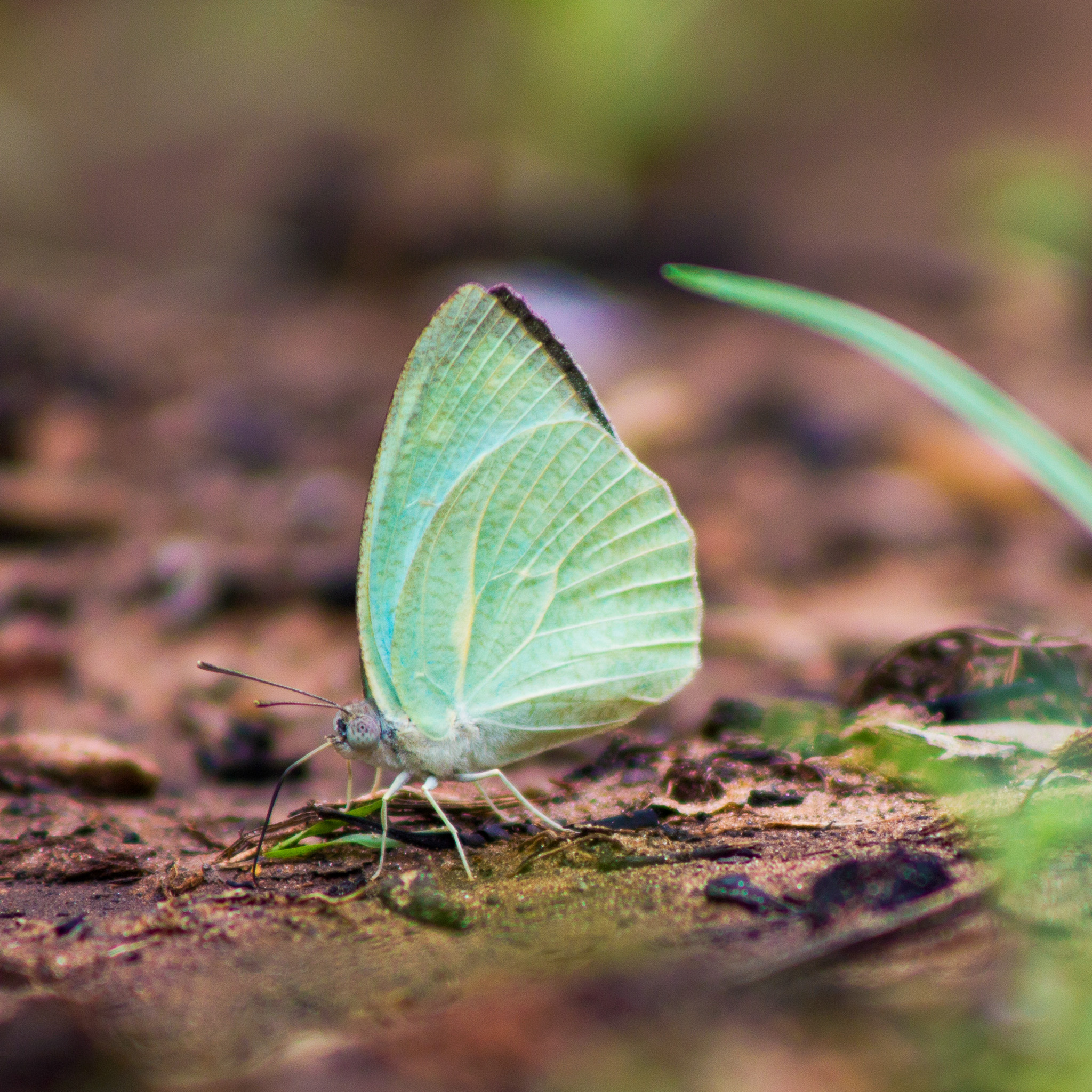
Mud Puddling | Sri Lanka

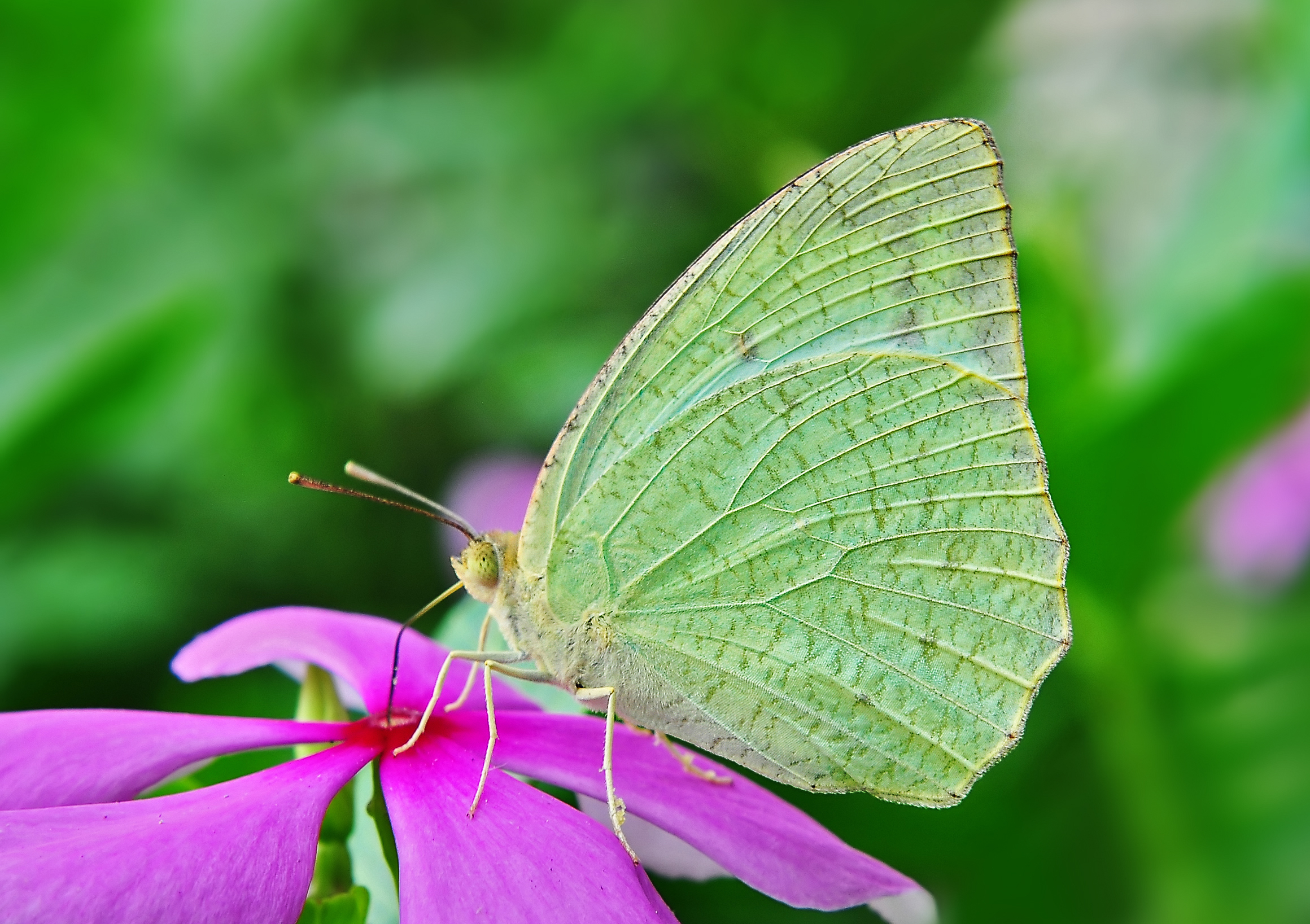
Catopsilia pyranthe on Catharanthus roseus

== See also ==
- List of butterflies of India (Pieridae)

== References and notes ==
- Shihan, T.R. (2016). A Photographic Guide to the Butterflies of Bangladesh. Butterfly Reintroduction Farm, Chuadanga, Bangladesh, 165pp.
