= Green sport event =

Sporting event with environmental considerations

A green sport event is a sporting event that prioritizes the use of environmentally sustainable resources and practices to reduce environmental impacts resulting from them. Major sporting bodies such as the Olympic Games and FIFA have increasingly supported and incorporates environmental sustainability in their planning and operations. Venues such as stadiums are implementing green strategies, innovations and programmes into their design and construction in support of these green sport events.

Fans can do their part by riding public transportation to the event. Environmental consciousness has led many organizers to use "earth friendly" paper products, fertilizer or degradable pesticides.

== Olympic Games ==
The first time that environmental concerns were raised by the public was at the 1992 Albertville Winter Olympics in France, which led to the first 'green Games' in Lillehammer, Norway, in 1994. The Lillehammer Olympic Organizing Committee received the UNEP Global 500 Award for setting environmental standards which were absent from previous Olympic games.

One week after the International Olympic Committee (IOC) awarded the XVII Olympic Winter Games to Lillehammer, national, local and regional governments decided to make the Lillehammer Games a showcase for GREEN mega-events. More than 200 different projects with environmental aspects were carried out. And at IOC's 100 years celebration in Paris in 1994, environment was added as the Third Dimension to the Olympics in addition to Sport and Culture.

The legacy from Lillehammer has, in a global perspective, followed two paths:

1. World Conferences on sport and environment, the first in Lillehammer in 1996
2. Environmental requirements which have to be met by future bidders and organisers of Olympic Games.

The Centennial Olympic Congress, Congress of Unity, held in Paris in 1994, recognised the importance of the environment and sustainable development, which led to the inclusion of a paragraph in Rule 2 of the Olympic Charter. The International Olympic Committee (IOC) has acknowledged its particular responsibility in terms of promoting sustainable development, and regards the environment as the third dimension of Olympism, alongside sport and culture. This led to its decision in 1995 to create an IOC Sport and Environment Commission.

Environmental Guidelines for the Summer Olympics were developed to guide Olympic hosts to ensure that facilities are constructed in a more environmentally friendly manner. The Guidelines were successfully used in the 2000 Sydney Olympic Games. As a result, the organizers of the Sydney Games were honoured with the Global 500 Award in 2001 for organizing the greenest games ever. Since then, other major sports events have also considered their environmental impact.

A major aspect of UNEP's work is with the IOC. A cooperative agreement was signed in 1994 with IOC and an Agenda 21 for Sport and Environment developed. Since 2002, UNEP has participated in a task force of the UN Secretary-General on the use of sport for the implementation of the United Nations Development Goals. UNEP also supports the IOC in organizing world conferences and regional seminars on sport and the environment.

=== Tokyo 2016 Olympics bid ===
Tokyo was a candidate host for the 2016 Olympics. Their intention had been to have the first carbon-minus games. A man-made island called Sea Forest off the Tokyo was going to be the place for the Olympic Cross-Country, Rowing, Canoe, Kayak and mountain bike and BMX competitions. Also they were going to have half a million trees planted on this island by 2016. U2's lead singer Bono was one of the first people to plant a tree on this island. During this major planning stage was also the Vice Governor of Tokyo, Hideo Sugawara, Beijing 2008 swimming medallist, Junichi Miyashita, and thousands of Tokyo 2016 green supporters. Tokyo's carbon-minus plan was to install the use of solar, wind and other renewable energy sources. They were going to have faculty helping where ever they could all over the stadium. Low or zero-emission vehicles are also includes in Tokyo 2016's plan.

== Fédération Internationale de Football Association (FIFA) ==
During the 2006 FIFA World Cup in Germany, the Green Goal™ initiative was first launched as a comprehensive program primarily aiming to reducing the environmental impact of major sporting events. It involved an incorporation of measurable environmental targets in four key areas namely; energy, sustainable transportation, water, and waste management. It addressed both direct and indirect impacts of mega-sporting events, making it the world's first major sporting event to aim to have a neutral impact on the global climate. The initiative was also implemented in the 2010 FIFA World Cup in South Africa. The Host City, Cape Town, was awarded the International Olympic Committee (IOC) Sport and Environment Award. Nominated by FIFA, the award recognized the efforts of the Host City, Cape Town, to mitigate negative environmental impacts of the FIFA World Cup and to maximize a positive environmental and social legacy.

In 2016, FIFA joined the United Nations Framework Convention on Climate Change's Climate Neutral Now campaign, which is a global community of organizations committed to ensure climate neutrality by the middle of the 21st century. With this, they became the first international sports organization to do so. In 2018, FIFA joined the UN Sports for Climate Action Framework. In 2021, FIFA first introduced its Climate Strategy Report, wherein the corporation pledged to reduce its carbon emissions by 50 percent by 2030, and achieve net-zero emissions by 2040.

The subsequent World Cups held in Brazil in 2014, Russia in 2018 and Qatar in 2022 continued to advance FIFA's environmental efforts. In the 2014 FIFA World Cup, FIFA's "Football for the Planet" program was officially launched, which organized green goals such as the installation of solar panels in all stadiums. According to the United Nations Environment Programme (UNEP), these carbon offsetting strategies implemented saved 545,500 tonnes of carbon dioxide equivalent from being expelled from the environment, which helped offset the 59,200 tonnes that was predicted to be emitted by the games. The 2018 FIFA World Cup included new environment sustainability standards. It was the first edition to mandate green building certification for all newly constructed or renovated stadiums, ensuring that it is carried out in a more environmentally sustainable manner, in consideration of important environmental and social concerns to allow for long-term sustainable operations. An online campaign, Climate Action and Carbon Offset Programme, was also launched wherein ticket holders were invited to calculate and offset their travel emissions. For every person who signs up, FIFA will offset 2.9 tonnes of carbon emissions. The 2022 FIFA World Cup was the first edition to feature a dedicated program for the management of stadium energy, water and waste impacts, which was executed through design, construction and operations. With this, all eight stadiums featured achieved Global Sustainability Assessment System building certification as these infrastructures were designed with reusing and repurposing in mind, with all but one of the arenas that featured demountable components. The Global Sustainability Assessment System, developed by the Gulf Organisation for Research and Development, is a performance based green building system that factors in multiple aspects such as water conservation, indoor environment quality and waste management. In relation to this, the Supreme Committee for Delivery & Legacy and Gulf Organisation for Research and Development report that 79% of stadium construction waste was reused and recycled. Their energy and water performance report found that stadiums' water performance was 40% more efficient than when compared to International Plumbing Code and they were 42% more energy efficient in comparison to ASHRAE standards, an internationally recognized, consensus-based guidelines for HVAC&R systems on energy efficiency, indoor air quality and thermal comfort. In February 2022, Qatar became the first World Cup host to ever achieve ISO 20121 certification for sustainable event management.

The 2026 FIFA World Cup, which will be held in Canada, Mexico and the United States, will rely entirely on existing venues that have been optimized or renovated. Mexican stadiums have already achieved Leadership in Energy and Environmental Design (LEED) certification and are in the process of pursuing or already have achieved achieved LEED BD+C certification, which goes beyond FIFA's baseline standards. The sustainability agenda has expanded to supply chain, wherein areas such as food and beverage concessions and merchandising will be addressed. For example, in the host city of Houston, a hospitality incentive program for sustainability is available to hotels, motels, and restaurants in the area, wherein those who implement actions from a set hospitality sustainability toolkit can earn points/certifications. Based on these points, businesses earn recognition at different levels and receive corresponding benefits.

These efforts have faced criticism for greenwashing and understating actual emission data that exceed its offsets. FIFA's own sustainability report disclosed that the 2022 FIFA World Cup generated around 3.8 million tonnes of CO₂ equivalent emissions across preparation, staging and post-event activities. However, multiple independent analyses, such as reports by Carbon Market Watch and New Weather Institute, argue that this figure is likely an underestimate. FIFA has faced criticism over its carbon accounting. According to a Carbon Market Watch report, FIFA's carbon accounting utilizes a "use share" method that allocates only a fraction of stadium construction emissions to the tournament, based on the event's duration relative to the stadium's estimated lifetime, rather than fully accounting for the emissions when the venues are built. This approach underestimates the World Cup’s true climate impact because the stadiums were constructed specifically for the World Cup and the assumption of long-term future usage of the stadiums is uncertain and unreliable. FIFA also relied on low-quality offsets as several carbon credits were issued through the Global Carbon Council, a carbon offsetting registry created specifically for this tournament, raising concerns about whether the credits met additionality requirements and verification whether the projects would have happened anyway. The Swiss Fairness Commission, an advertising regulator, upheld complaints from United Kingdom, France, Switzerland, Belgium and the Netherlands reporting that FIFA made false and misleading statements about the World Cup’s reduced environmental impact and said that claims were not properly substantiated. A report by BBC Sport reported that FIFA's carbon-neutral claim was dangerous and misleading.

== Green Sport Venues ==
=== Target Center ===
The Target Center home of the Minnesota Timberwolves (NBA) has the 5th largest green roof, and if the first arena to have a green roof. It collects rain water and regulates temperatures in both the summer and the winter. It has collected nearly 1 million gallons of rain water and it has diverted it into the Mississippi River. Also on the top of the roof there are different kinds of plants such as prairie coreopsis, wild strawberry, dotted blazing-star, and lupine.

=== American Airlines Center ===
The American Airlines Center home of the Miami Heat (NBA) has been awarded LEED Certification for Existing Buildings: Operations & Maintenance by the U.S. Green Building Council (USGBC), being one of two the first two to receive this award. The center received the award on the same day as the Philips Arena in Atlanta. This center has committed to saving energy and water savings. They wish that they could be a lead to other sports venues becoming more "green" too.

"Green" features at the American Airline Center:

Roofing materials: The arena's solar reflective index is high enough that it reflects heat and reduces the energy needed to cool the building.
Energy consumption: The arena was built without a chilled water plant, which requires a lot of energy, therefore, there is much less energy consumption as the arena's chilled water comes from an off-site source.
Water-efficient landscaping: All plants are high to medium drought resistant, and a "drip and soak" irrigation system (micro irrigation) runs under the surface delivering water directly to the roots and minimizing the amount of water evaporated by the sun.
Underground parking: Reduces heat-trapping asphalt to trap heat, which is known to cause a "heat-island effect" which releases heat back into the atmosphere.
Walk-off carpets: Trap dirt and contamination of arena guests to improve overall indoor air quality.

== See also ==
- Sustainable event management
- Green conventions
- Game Day Recycling
- Recycling
- X games
- Greenwashing
