= 2030 =

2030 in various calendars
- Gregorian calendar: 2030; MMXXX
- Ab urbe condita: 2783
- Armenian calendar: 1479; ԹՎ ՌՆՀԹ
- Assyrian calendar: 6780
- Baháʼí calendar: 186–187
- Balinese saka calendar: 1951–1952
- Bengali calendar: 1436–1437
- Berber calendar: 2980
- British Regnal year: N/A
- Buddhist calendar: 2574
- Burmese calendar: 1392
- Byzantine calendar: 7538–7539
- Chinese calendar: 己酉年 (Earth Rooster); 4727 or 4520 — to — 庚戌年 (Metal Dog); 4728 or 4521
- Coptic calendar: 1746–1747
- Discordian calendar: 3196
- Ethiopian calendar: 2022–2023
- Hebrew calendar: 5790–5791
- Hindu calendars
- Vikram Samvat: 2086–2087
- Shaka Samvat: 1951–1952
- Kali Yuga: 5130–5131
- Holocene calendar: 12030
- Igbo calendar: 1030–1031
- Iranian calendar: 1408–1409
- Islamic calendar: 1451–1452
- Japanese calendar: Reiwa 12 (令和１２年)
- Javanese calendar: 1963–1964
- Juche calendar: 119
- Julian calendar: Gregorian minus 13 days
- Korean calendar: 4363
- Minguo calendar: ROC 119 民國119年
- Nanakshahi calendar: 562
- Thai solar calendar: 2573
- Tibetan calendar: ས་མོ་བྱ་ལོ་ (female Earth-Bird); 2156 or 1775 or 1003 — to — ལྕགས་ཕོ་ཁྱི་ལོ་ (male Iron-Dog); 2157 or 1776 or 1004
- Unix time: 1893456000 – 1924991999

2030 (MMXXX) will be a common year starting on Tuesday of the Gregorian calendar, the 2030th year of the Common Era (CE) and Anno Domini (AD) designations, the 30th year of the 3rd millennium and the 21st century, and the 1st year of the 2030s decade.

== Predicted and scheduled events ==
- February 1–17 – The 2030 Winter Olympics is scheduled to be held in the French Alps.
- February 28 – The 2029 World Horticultural Expo is scheduled to be closed in Nakhon Ratchasima, Thailand.
- March 27 – The 2030 South Korean presidential election is scheduled to be held.
- April – Europa Clipper will arrive at Jupiter's moon Europa.
- June 8 – July 21 – The 2030 FIFA World Cup is scheduled to be held in Spain, Portugal, and Morocco (with anniversary match hosts Uruguay, Argentina, and Paraguay).
- July 24 – August 4 – The 2030 Mediterranean Games are expected to take place in Pristina, Kosovo.
- September 1 – The autonomous region of Bougainville has recommended this date for independence from Papua New Guinea, pending ratification of the 2019 referendum.
- October 1 – The 2030 World Expo will be opened in Riyadh, Saudi Arabia.
- October 18 - If not triggered earlier, the next Serbian parliamentary election must be held no later than this date.

=== Date unknown ===
- The 2030 Hungarian parliamentary election is scheduled to be held.
- Predicted in 2022, the year in which both the Voyager 1 and Voyager 2 space probes will run out of power and cease transmission.
- New petrol and diesel cars will be banned from sale in the UK.
- Masdar City in Abu Dhabi is expected to be completed by 2030.
- The 2030 Asian Games are scheduled to be held in Doha.
- A Japanese construction firm, the Shimizu Corporation, in concert with many research firms and government agencies, has plans for an underwater city of 5,000 people called the "ocean spiral" 4.5 km (2.8 mi) off the Japanese coast, which will consist of a giant sphere containing homes and businesses situated just below the surface, held up by a 14 km (9 mi) spiral descending to the seabed, where there will be a submarine port and a factory powering the city by using microorganisms that turn carbon dioxide into methane. The Shimizu Corporation plans to start construction in 2025.
- Targets of the goals of the United Nations' 2030 Agenda are set for 2030.
- Some climate-related goals from COP26 are for 2030:
  - The Glasgow Climate Pact aims to "[reduce] global carbon dioxide emissions by 55 percent by 2030 relative to the 2010 level". However, based on existing pledges the emissions in the year 2030 will be 14% higher than in 2010.
  - More than 100 countries pledged to reverse deforestation.
  - India plans to draw half of its energy requirement from renewable sources.
  - China aims to peak CO_{2} emissions before 2030.
- The 2030 Climate Target Plan of the EU aims to cut greenhouse gas emissions by at least 55% by 2030. The European Commission made proposals in July 2021 for how to achieve this goal.
- The international community, including the United Nations, World Bank, and the United States, have set the goal of completely eradicating extreme poverty by 2030. Noting a significant decline in extreme poverty since 1990, the World Bank has noted that the end of extreme poverty is in sight and pledged to cut it down to at most 3% of the world's population by this time.
- The World Health Organization and UNICEF have set a goal for universal access to basic sanitation by 2030.
- The United Nations has made it a goal that Internet access and literacy will be universal by 2030. French demographist Emmanuel Todd forecasted that the global literacy rates will be almost 100% by this year.
- The World Bank has called for all countries to implement universal health care by this time.
- Shared Prosperity Vision 2030
- Kenya Vision 2030
- Saudi Vision 2030
- Egypt Vision 2030
- Qatar National Vision 2030
- National Development Plan 2030
- Eritrea Vision 2030
- Sudan Vision 2030
- Finland plans on being a nicotine-free and smoke-free country by 2030.
- The 2030 Commonwealth Games are expected to take place in Ahmedabad, India.
- Formula 1 set to bring 2.1 Litre V8 engines with the approval of engine manufacturers.
- Poland is projected to have a higher GDP per capita than the United Kingdom by the end of the year.
