= Green Team (disambiguation) =

Green Team is a brand communications and creative agency.

Green Team may also refer to:

- Green Team (comics), a fictional comic book team
- Green Team Advisory Committee of Fair Lawn, New Jersey, U.S.
- Green Team, University of Florida's TailGator team for game day recycling
- Green Team, the training wing of United States Navy's SEAL Team Six
- Sustainable Green Team, an American forestry company
- Nvidia, an American technology company

== See also ==
- Team Green, now Andretti Global
