= Green conventions =

Gathering that focuses on minimizing environmental

Green conventions or green meetings are conventions which are conducted in ways which minimize the environmental burdens imposed by such activities. Green event planners apply environmentally preferred practices to waste management, resource and energy use, travel and local transportation, facilities selection, siting and construction, food provision and disposal, hotels and accommodations, and management and purchasing decisions. The practice is known as "event greening" or "sustainable event management".

Green event and convention planning is now an established trend within the global tourism, sport events and convention industry. Several cities in the United States and Europe now sport green convention centers designed using green building principles and practices.

Several high visibility events including the Olympic Games in Italy, Sydney, Utah, and Greece; the World Summit on Sustainable Development in Johannesburg, and the 2004 Democratic and Republican National Conventions have implemented green practices with varied success. A more recent example is that of Live Earth, a series of worldwide concerts held on July 7, 2007, that initiated a three-year campaign to combat climate change. Such efforts aim to conserve resources, protect air and water quality, habitat and human health, and showcase sustainability practices and concerns.

Parts of the tourism and convention industry now promote green meetings, conferences, and convention planning as demand for sustainability measures increases. Industry associations have produced standards and guides for green meetings. Government agencies and non-profit organizations also promote these practices with research, recommendations, grants and technical support. Some private consultants in the meeting planning industry specialize in mounting green events, and industry groups and governments now sponsor awards to recognize achievements.

Green conventions, meetings, conferencing and events are part of an international movement to achieve a sustainable world economy and livable planet.

== See also ==
- Agenda 21
- Environmental impact of aviation
- Environmental protection
- Green building
- Hypermobility (travel)
- Resource depletion
- Sustainable business
- Sustainable development
- Sustainable event management or event greening
- Sustainable tourism
