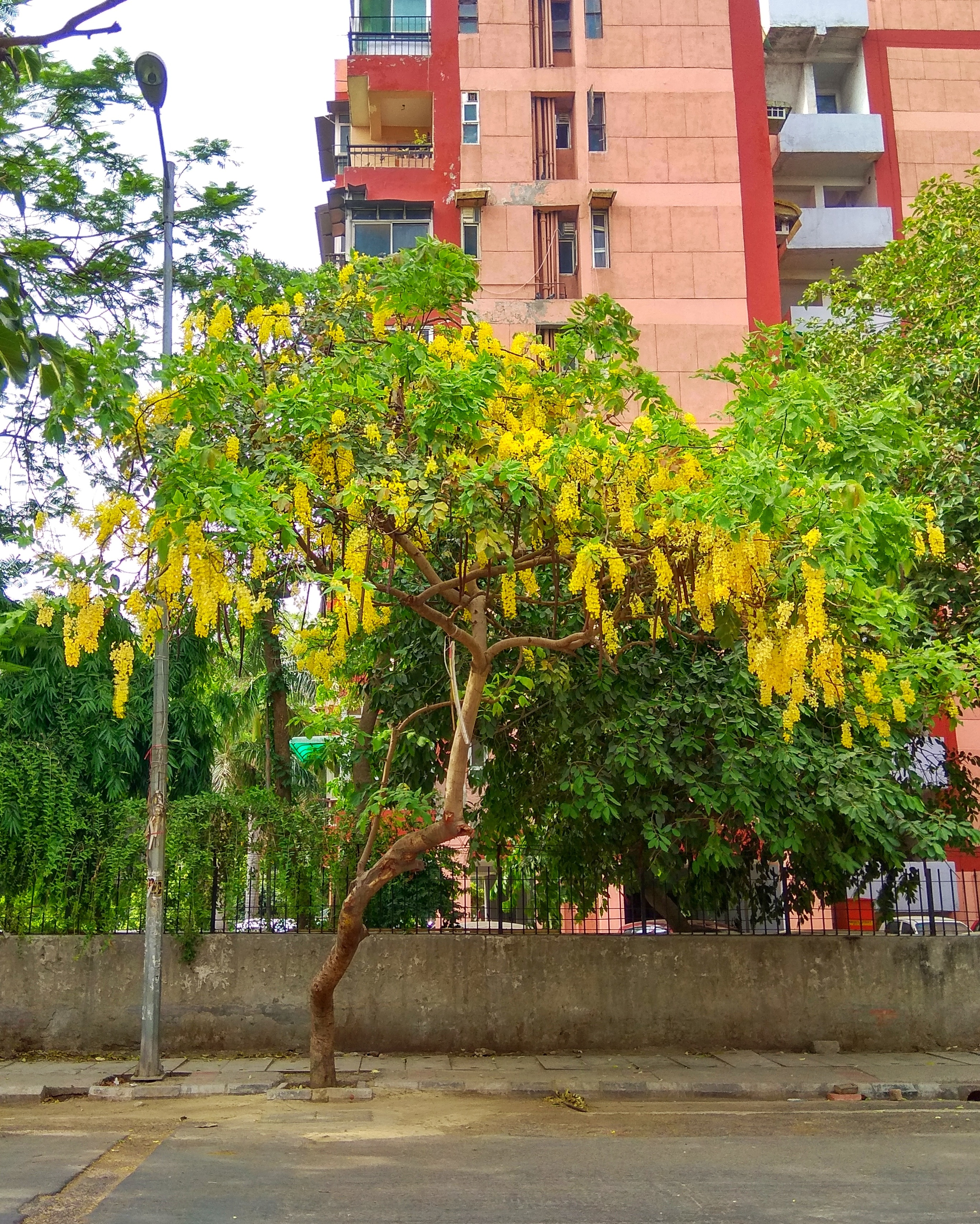
- Tree in bloom
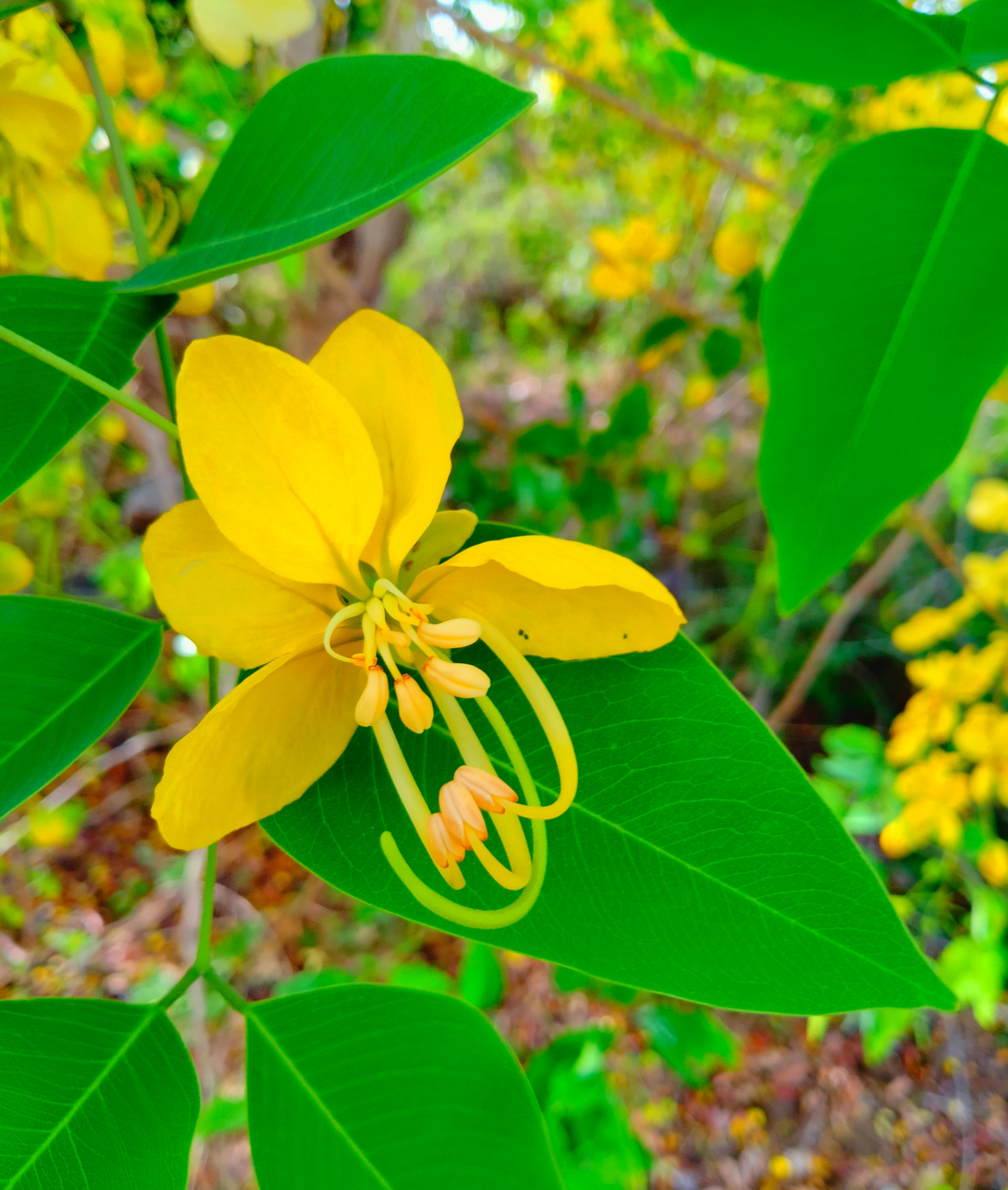
- Flower

Conservation status
- Least Concern (IUCN 3.1)

Scientific classification
- Kingdom: Plantae
- Clade: Tracheophytes
- Clade: Angiosperms
- Clade: Eudicots
- Clade: Rosids
- Order: Fabales
- Family: Fabaceae
- Subfamily: Caesalpinioideae
- Genus: Cassia
- Species: C. fistula

Binomial name
- Cassia fistula L.

Synonyms
- Bactyrilobium fistula Willd.; Cassia bonplandiana DC.; Cassia excelsa Kunth; Cassia fistuloides Collad.; Cassia rhombifolia Roxb.; Cathartocarpus excelsus G.Don; Cathartocarpus fistula Pers.; Cathartocarpus fistuloides (Collad.) G.Don; Cathartocarpus rhombifolius G.Don

= Cassia fistula =

Species of flowering plant

Cassia fistula, also known as golden shower, purging cassia, Indian laburnum, kani konna, or pudding-pipe tree, is a flowering plant in the family Fabaceae. The species is native to the Indian subcontinent and adjacent regions of Southeast Asia. It is the national tree and flower of Thailand and the state flower of Kerala state in India. It is also a popular ornamental plant and is also used in herbal medicine.

== Description ==
The golden shower tree is a medium-sized tree, growing to 10–20 m (33–66 ft) tall with fast growth. The leaves are deciduous, 15–60 cm (6–24 in) long, and pinnate with three to eight pairs of leaflets, each leaflet 7–21 cm (3–8 in) long and 4–9 cm (1 1/2–3 1/2 in) broad.

The flowers are produced in pendulous racemes 20–40 cm (8–16 in) long, each flower 4–7 cm (1 5/8–2 3/4 in) diameter with five yellow petals of equal size and shape. The fruit is a legume, 30–60 cm (12–24 in) long and 1.5–2.5 cm (9/16–1 in) broad, with a pungent odor and containing several seeds.

The tree has strong and very durable wood, and has been used to construct "Ehela Kanuwa", a site at Adam's Peak, Sri Lanka, which is made of C. fistula (ahala, ehela, or aehaela, ඇහැල in Sinhala) heartwood. The golden shower tree is not a nitrogen fixer.

== Cultivation ==
Cassia fistula is widely grown as an ornamental plant in tropical and subtropical areas. It blooms in late spring/early summer in hot, dry weather. Flowering is profuse, with trees being covered with yellow flowers, many times with almost no visible leaves. It grows well in dry climates. Growth for this tree is best in full sun on well-drained soil; it is relatively drought-tolerant and slightly salt-tolerant. It will tolerate light brief frost, but can get damaged if the cold persists. It can be subject to mildew or leaf spot, especially during the second half of the growing season. The tree blooms better with pronounced differences between summer and winter temperatures.

== Pollinators and seed dispersal ==
Various species of bees and butterflies are known to be pollinators of C. fistula flowers, especially carpenter bees (Xylocopa sp.). In 1911, Robert Scott Troup conducted an experiment to determine how the seeds of C. fistula are dispersed. He found that golden jackals feed on the fruits and help in seed dispersal.

== Uses ==
It is used in Vishu festivals as a traditional trademark in Kerala.

=== Food ===
In India, flowers of the golden shower tree are sometimes eaten by people. The leaves have also been used to supplement the diets of cattle, sheep, and goats fed with low-quality forages.

=== Medical ===
In Ayurvedic medicine, the golden shower tree is known as aragvadha, meaning "disease killer". The fruit pulp is considered a purgative, and self-medication or any use without medical supervision is strongly advised against in Ayurvedic texts. Though it has been used in herbalism for millennia, little research has been conducted in modern times, although it is an ingredient in some mass-produced herbal laxatives. When used as such, it is known as "cassia pods".

Within developing countries, approximately 80% of populations prefer the usage of traditional medicine to resolve primary medical symptoms. The medicines and drugs derived from plants along with other herbal formulations are considered low risk and have less side effects in comparison to modern medicine by many locals especially within the Asian communities.

In India, a cathartic made from the pulp is sometimes added to tobacco.

=== Cosmetic ===
Cassia fistula flower extract displayed an anti-aging property when introduced to the human skin fibroblast and has a variety of cosmetic and nutritional applications. It displays an ability to cause hypopigmentation and can be applied as a whitening agent.

== Culture ==
Cassia fistula is both the national tree and national flower of Thailand – in Thai ratchaphruek (Thai: ราชพฤกษ์) and the blossoms are commonly referred to as dok khun (Thai: ดอกคูน). Its yellow flowers symbolize Thai royalty. A 2006–2007 flower festival, the Royal Flora Ratchaphruek, was named after the tree. Cassia fistula is also featured on a 2003 joint Canadian-Thai design for a 48-cent stamp, part of a series featuring national emblems.

The Indian laburnum is the state flower of Kerala. The flowers are of ritual importance in preparation of Kani during the Vishu festival of Kerala which falls in the month of April. The tree has been depicted on a 20-rupee stamp.

The tree is frequently cultivated in Buddhist temples in Sri Lanka where the Sinhala name is Ehela, ඇහැල. The tree is also the provincial tree of the North Central Province of Sri Lanka.

In Laos, its blooming flowers known locally as dok khoun are associated with the Lao New Year. People use the flowers as offerings at the temple, and also hang them in their homes for the New Year in belief that the flowers will bring happiness and good luck to the households.

The laburnum is the school tree of National Taiwan Normal University, thought to be because of the seed pods' similarity to the whips used by teachers in times past.

== Gallery ==
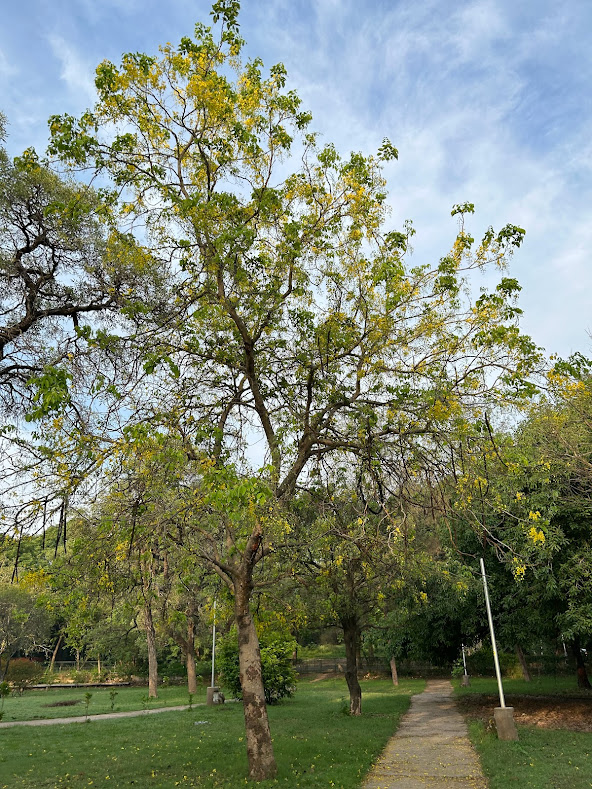
In Chandigarh, India

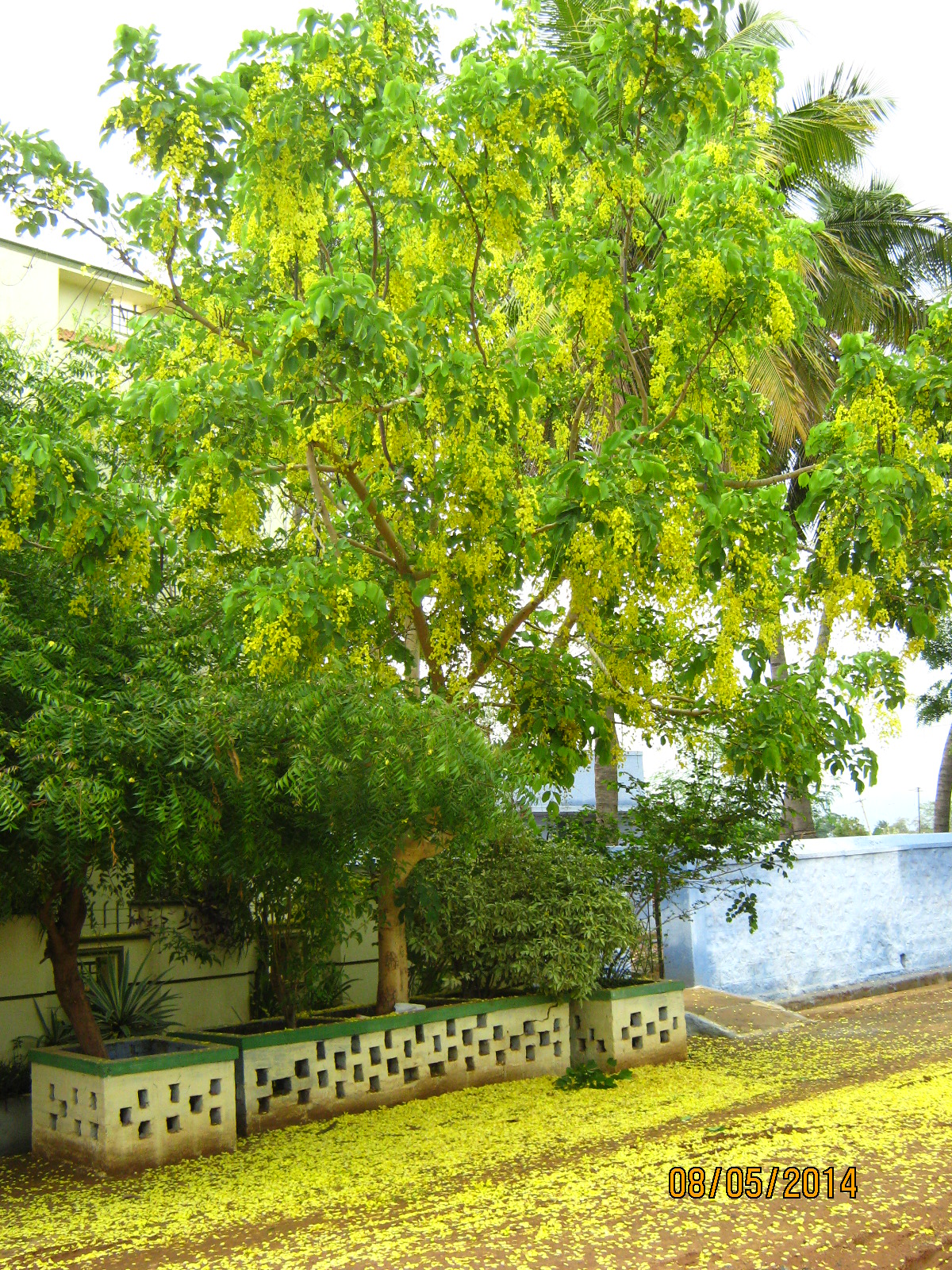
Tree at full bloom

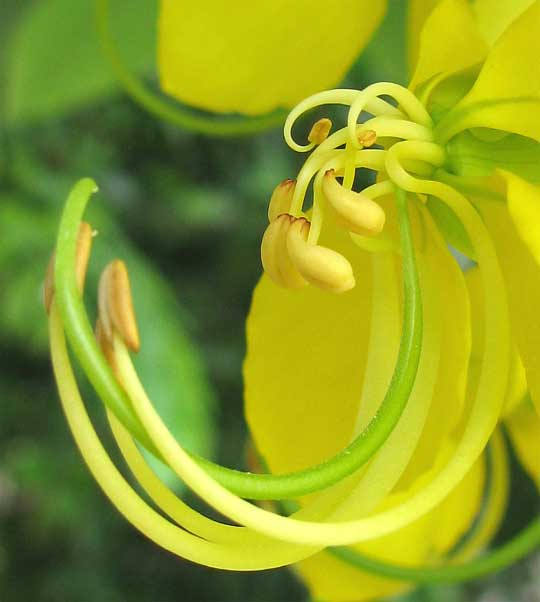
Flower detail

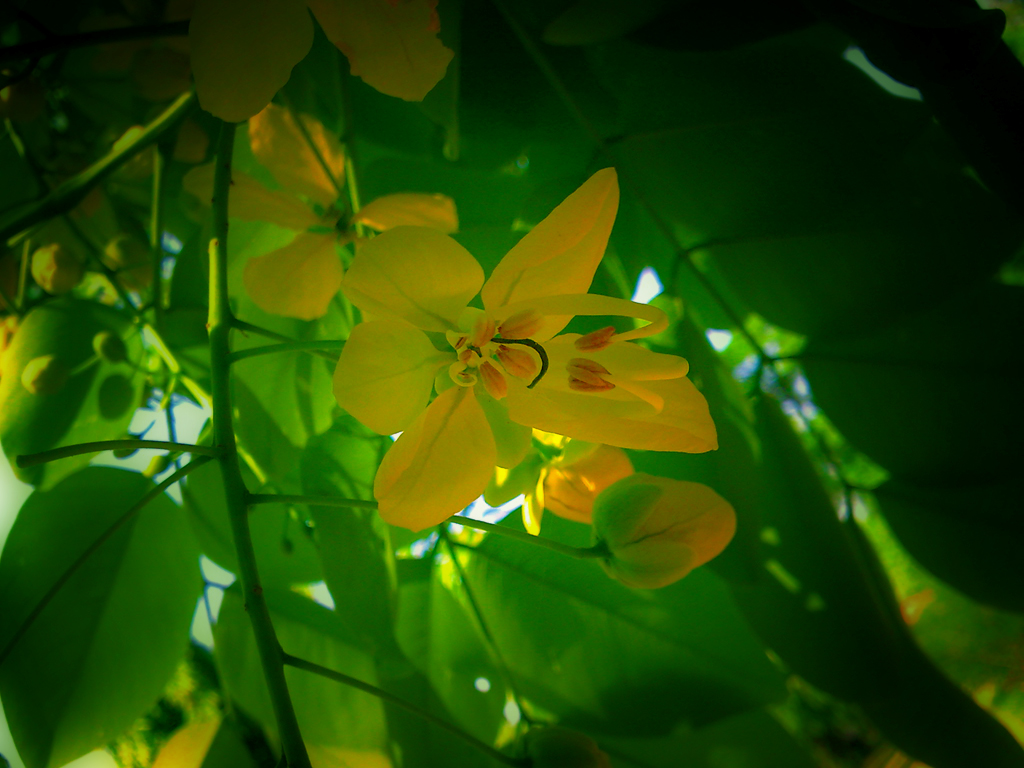
Flower in Chandigarh, India

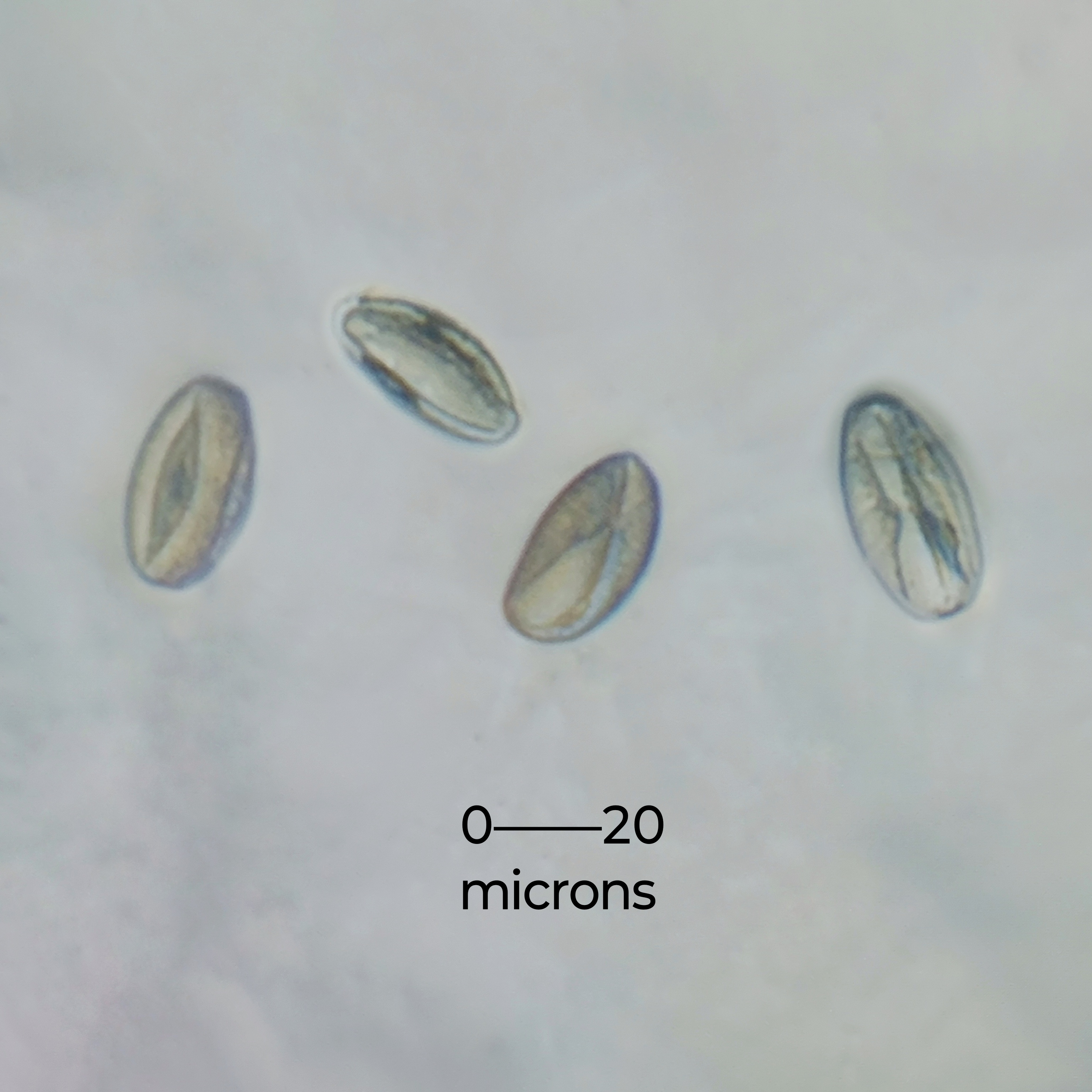
Pollen grains

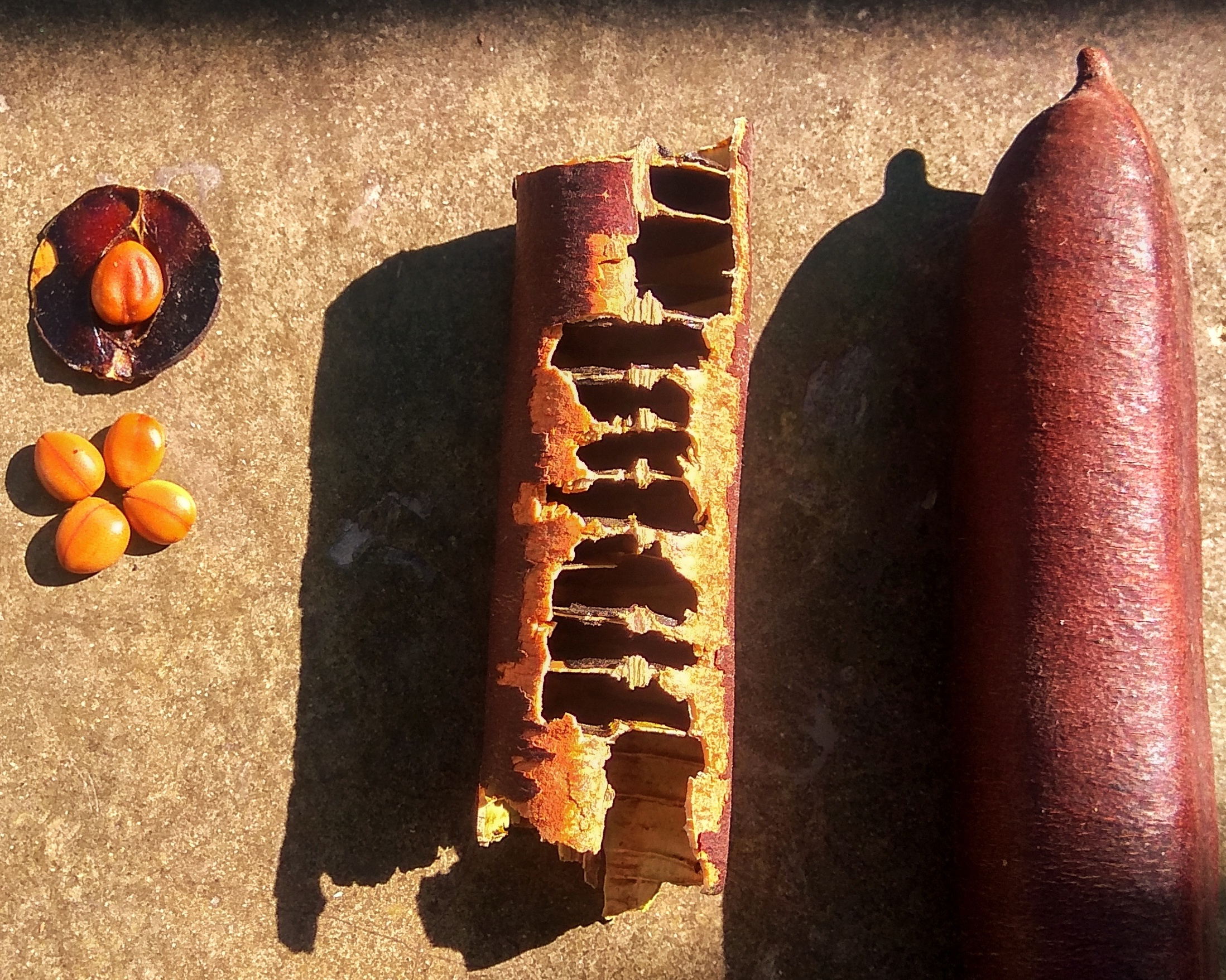
Seeds

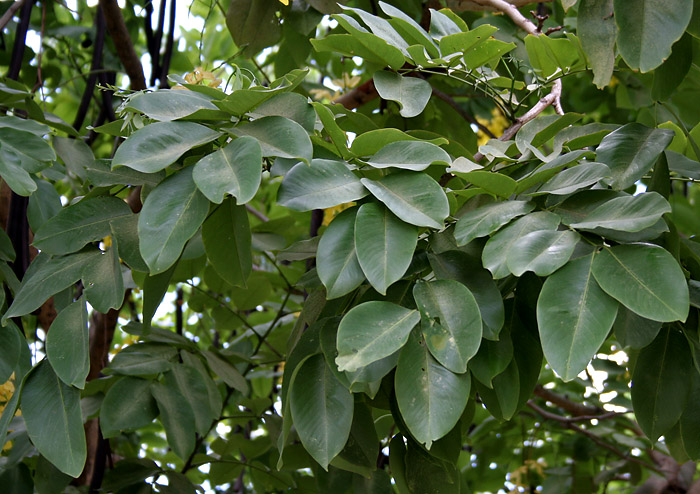
Leaves in Hyderabad, India

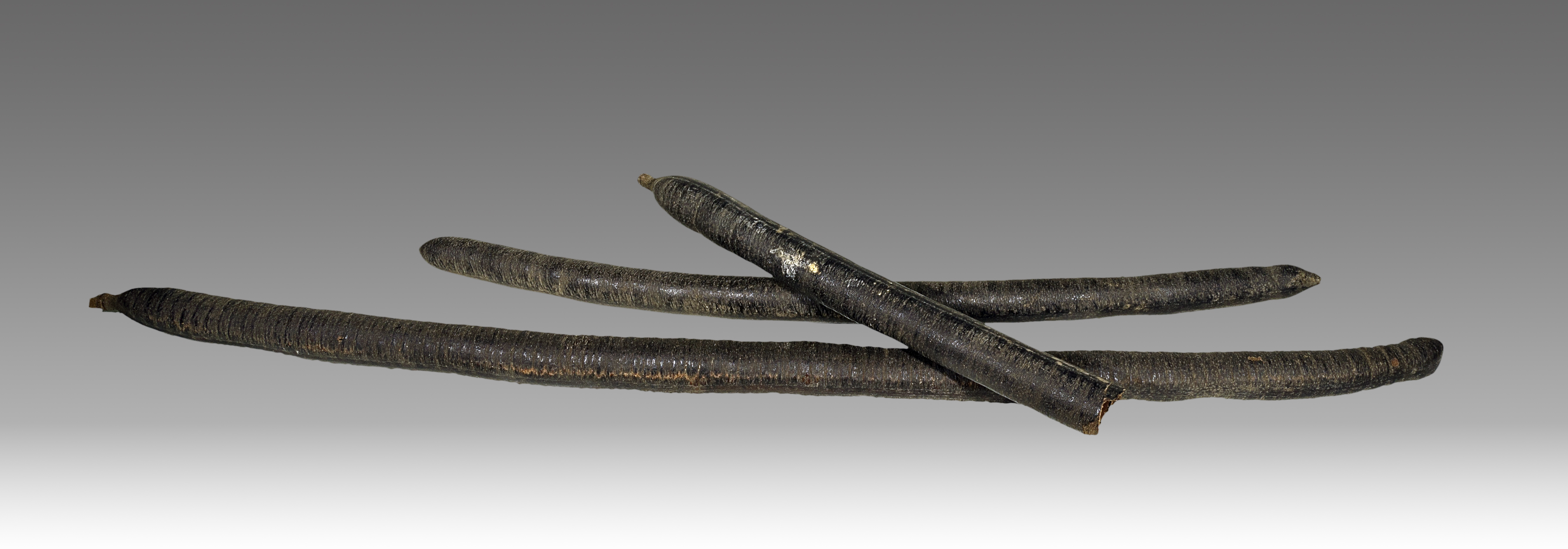
Fruit

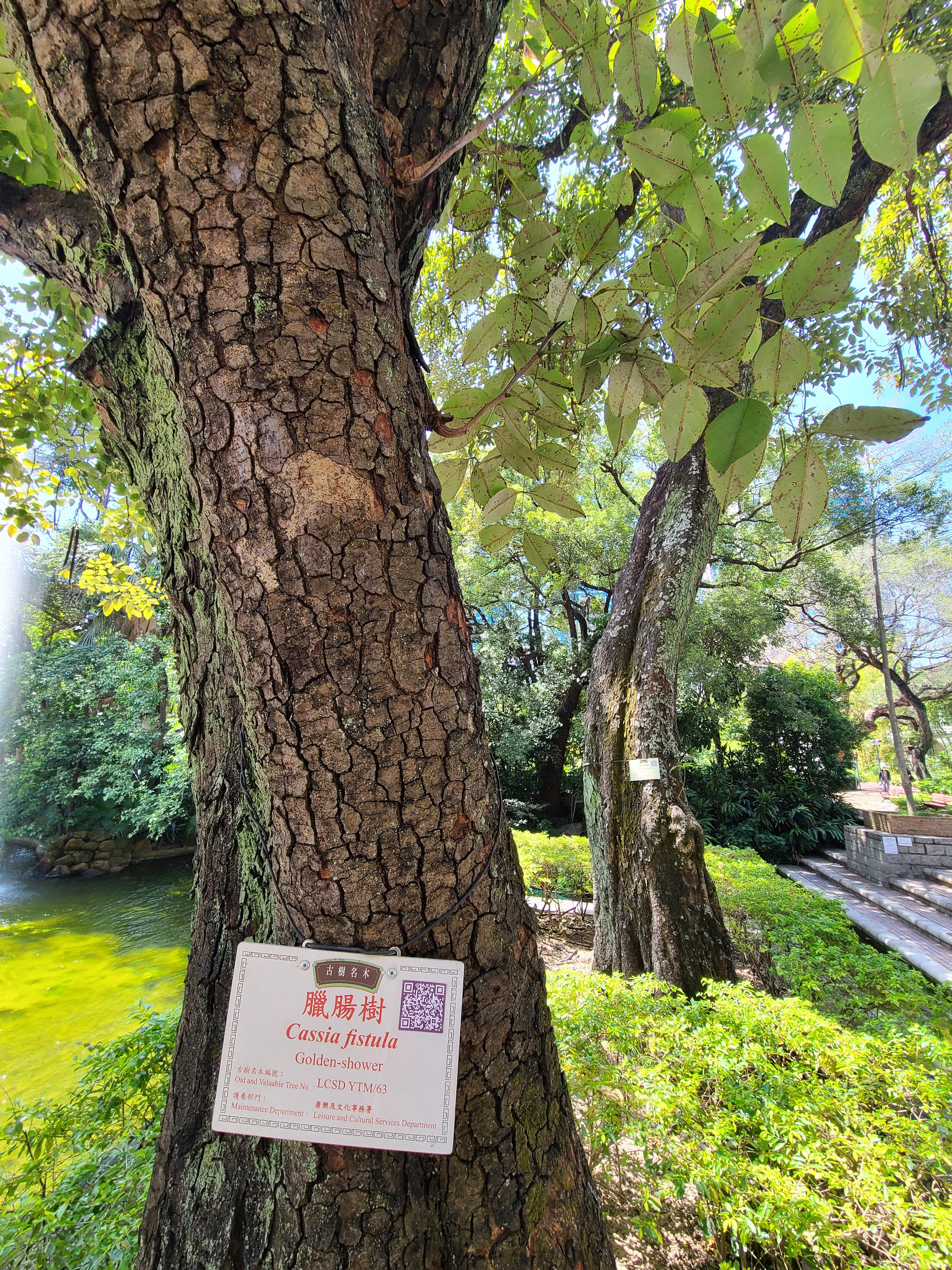
Bark in Hong Kong

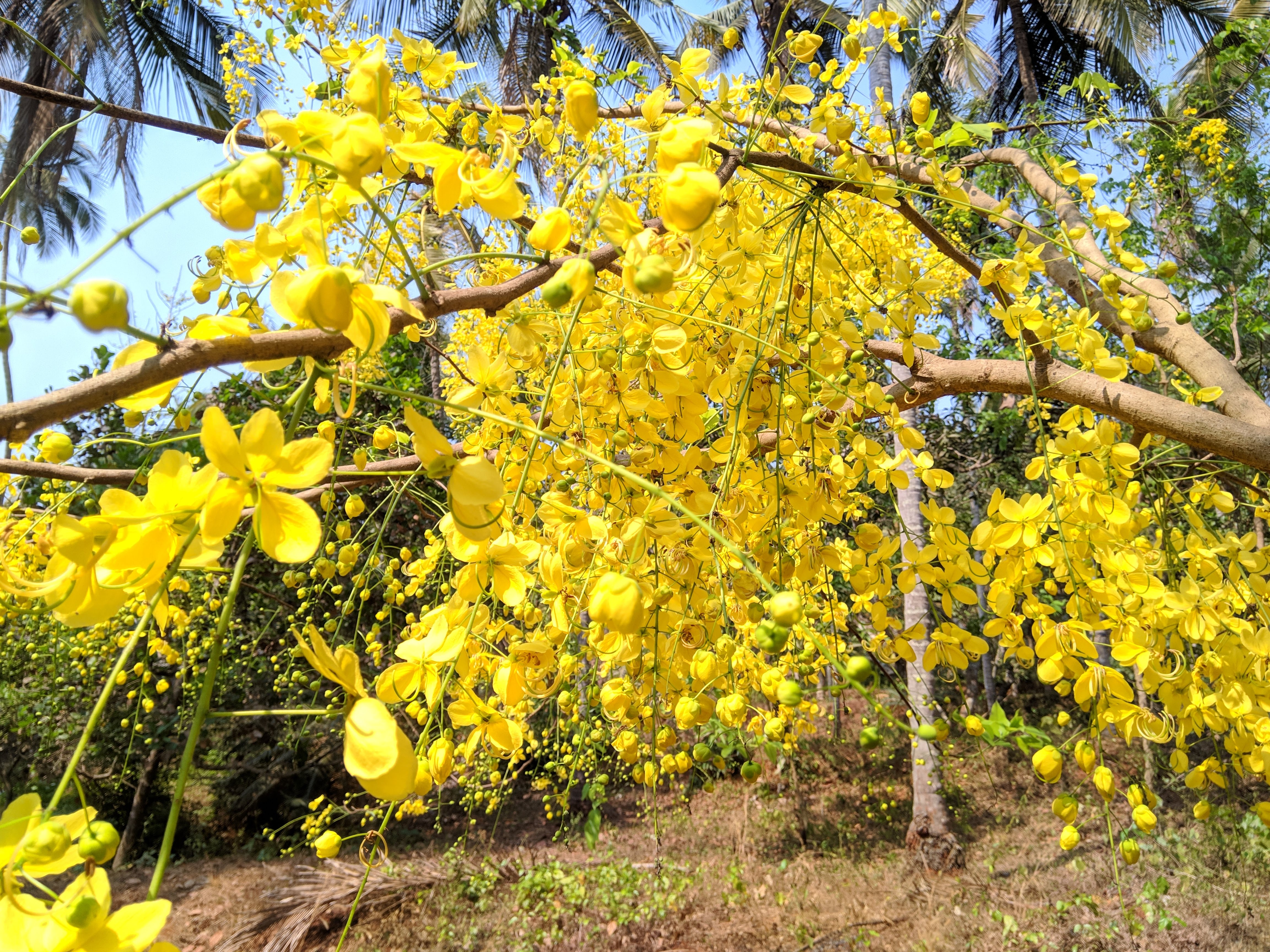
In Kerala

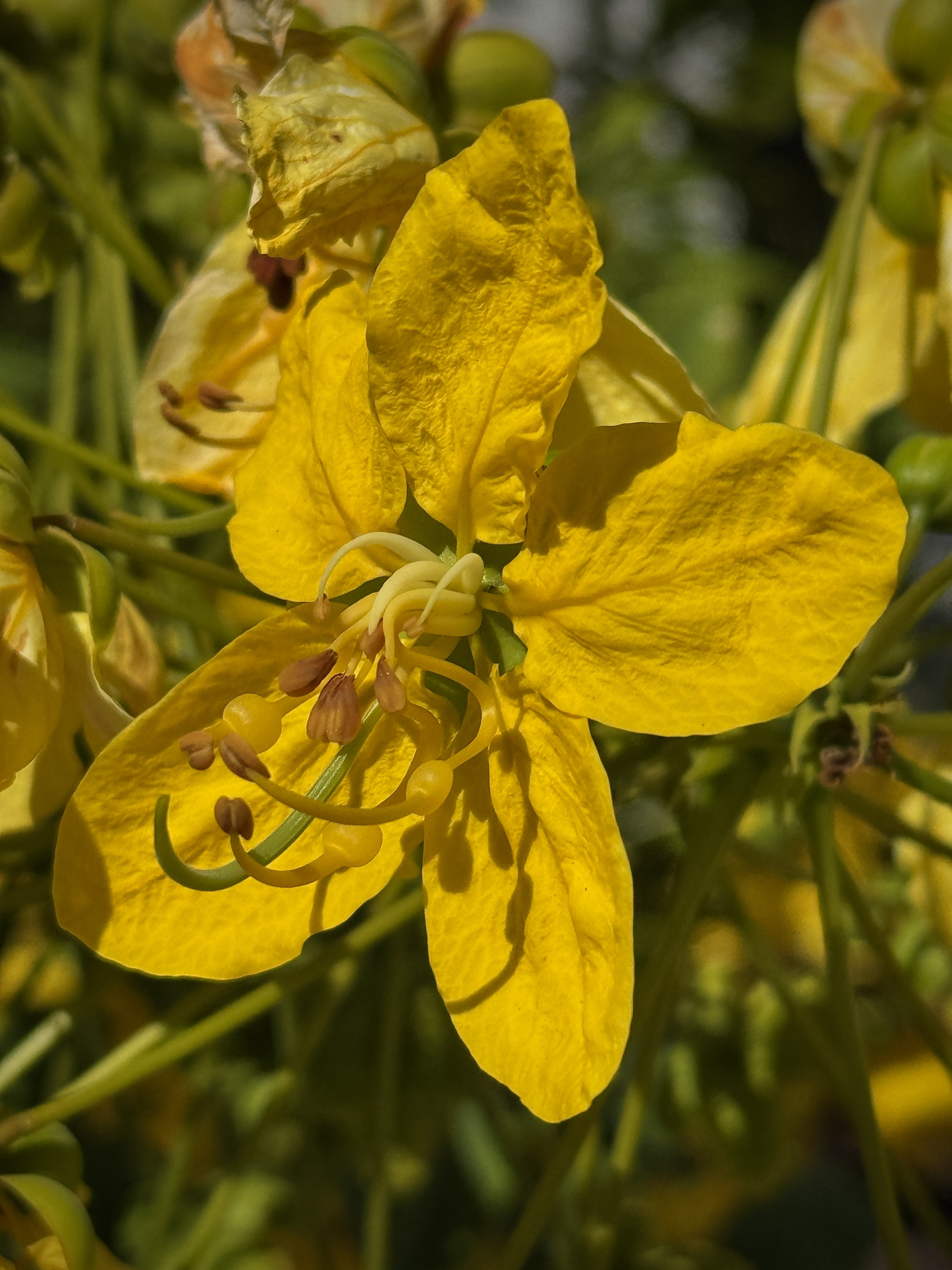
Inflorescence
