= Royal Flora Ratchaphruek 2006 =

Horticultural exposition in Thailand

EXPO 2006-2007 Chiang Mai
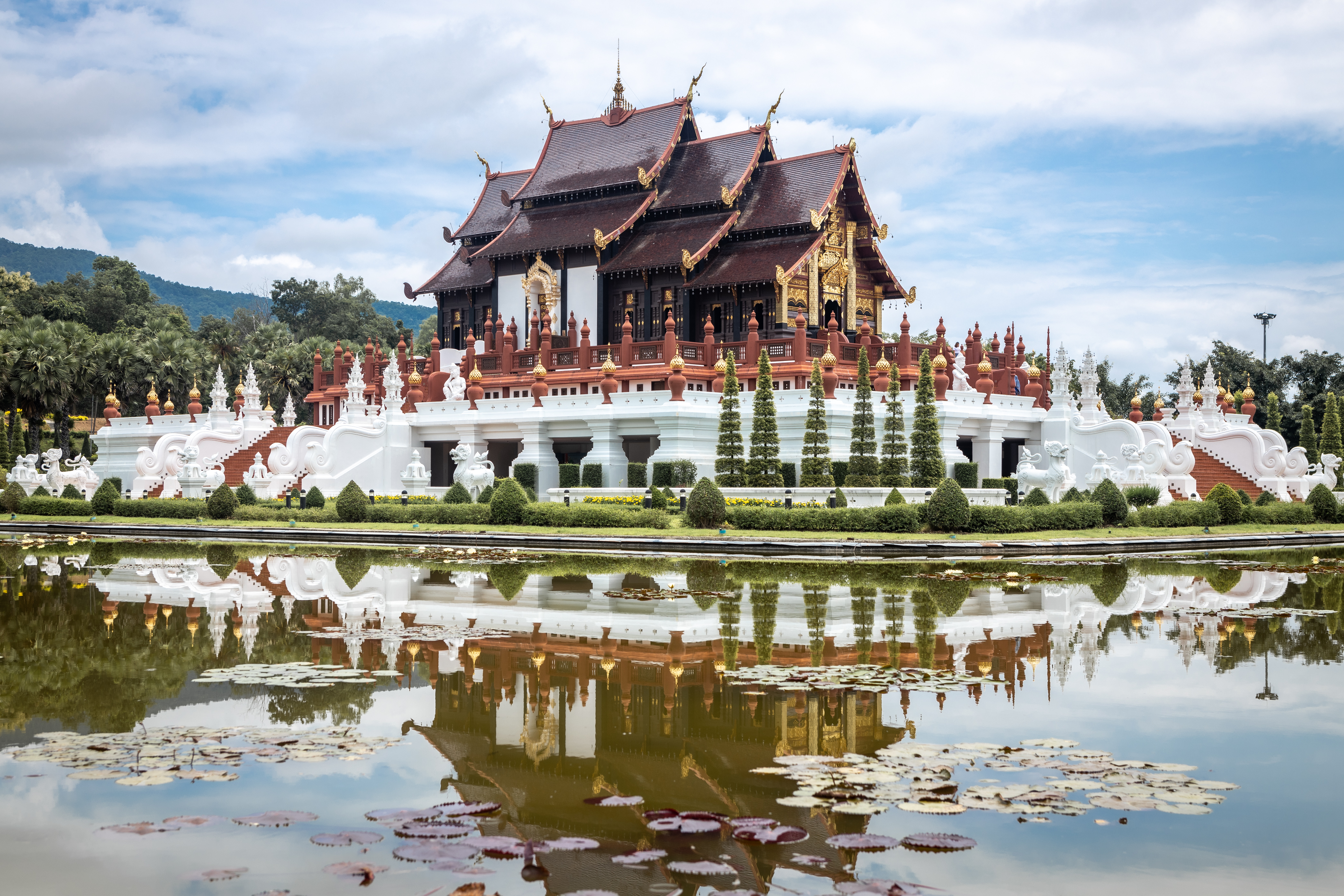
- Royal Pavilion or Ho Kum Luang

Overview
- BIE-class: Horticultural exposition
- Name: Royal Flora Ratchaphurek
- Motto: "To Express Love For Humanity"
- Area: 80 hectares (200 acres)
- Visitors: 3,848,791

Participant(s)
- Countries: 30

Location
- Country: Thailand
- City: Chiang Mai
- Venue: Royal Park Rajapruek
- Coordinates: 18°44′45.4″N 98°55′31.8″E

Timeline
- Awarded: December 1, 2005
- Opening: November 1, 2006
- Closure: January 31, 2007

Horticultural expositions
- Previous: Expo 2003 in Rostock
- Next: Expo 2012 in Venlo

Specialized expositions
- Previous: Expo '98 in Lisbon
- Next: Expo 2008 in Zaragoza

Universal expositions
- Previous: Expo 2005 in Aichi
- Next: Expo 2010 in Shanghai

The Royal Flora Ratchaphruek was an international horticultural exposition held 1 November, 2006 to 31 January, 2007 at Mae Hia, Chiang Mai Province, Thailand that drew 3,848,791 visitors. Recognised by the Bureau International des Expositions (BIE), it was one of the grand celebrations hosted by the Royal Thai Government in honor of King Bhumibol, the world's longest reigning monarch.

== Preparation ==
The ratchaphruek (Cassia fistula), or golden shower tree, is the de facto national flower of Thailand. Its yellow blossoms correspond to Monday, the birthday of Bhumibol. It is also named "Khun" or "Rajapruek".

The event was located on 80 hectares of land at the Royal Agricultural Research Center in the Mae Hia sub-district, Mueang district, Chiang Mai Province in northern Thailand. The 92 days of the expo featured 30 international gardens reflecting nations such as Japan, South Korea, Belgium, Netherlands, South Africa, and Canada. More than 2.5 million trees of 2,200 species of tropical plants and flowers were on display in this exhibition. The Association of International Horticultural Producers (AIPH), gave this expo A1 status, its highest level. Such exhibitions occur only once a year throughout the world. In addition, a host country can only hold one such exhibition once a decade.

== The festival ==
The festival included many highlights to attract tourists:

- Gardens for the king There were two features in this zone: one was international gardens, which were presented by 30 participating nations and covered 21,000 square meters; the other was corporate gardens, which covered 27,475 square meters, and were presented by both Thai state enterprises, and domestic and international major corporations.
- Ho Kham Royal Pavilion This building featured Lanna architecture, the architectural style of northern Thailand; inside, visitors saw pictures of King Bhumibol's works and his dedication.
- Thai Tropical Garden The enormous 100,000-square-meter garden showcased the diversity of tropical horticulture: fruit varieties, plants, flowers, herbs, and rare plants.
- Expo Plaza This was the focus of the exposition's fun-filled activities, amenities, and services. Visitors were able to purchase products from royal projects and authentic local products from Chiang Mai such as handicrafts, paper umbrellas, and souvenirs.
- Cultural shows A total of 45 cultural shows from various regions of Thailand were performed, including traditional music and dance. In addition, cultural performances from other nations were presented.

The Thai government had expected an average of 20,000 visitors per day, with over 100,000 visitors on a crowded day, and 3 million visitors in total to attend the Royal Flora Ratchaphruek 2006. At the exposition's conclusion, organizers claimed that the exposition had injected 27 billion baht into the regional economy.

The Thai government has proposed transforming the site of the exposition into a permanent training center. Despite some complaints of corruption and substandard facilities, organizers believed the exposition achieved its goals of promoting tourism and developing Thai horticultural industries.

The park was open to the public in 2008 with many of the past highlights still very much in evidence, including the international exhibits. It is thought that it will remain to stay open as a valued addition to things to do in Chiang Mai. The park receives around 500 visitors a day at the moment, mainly Thai.

== Gallery ==
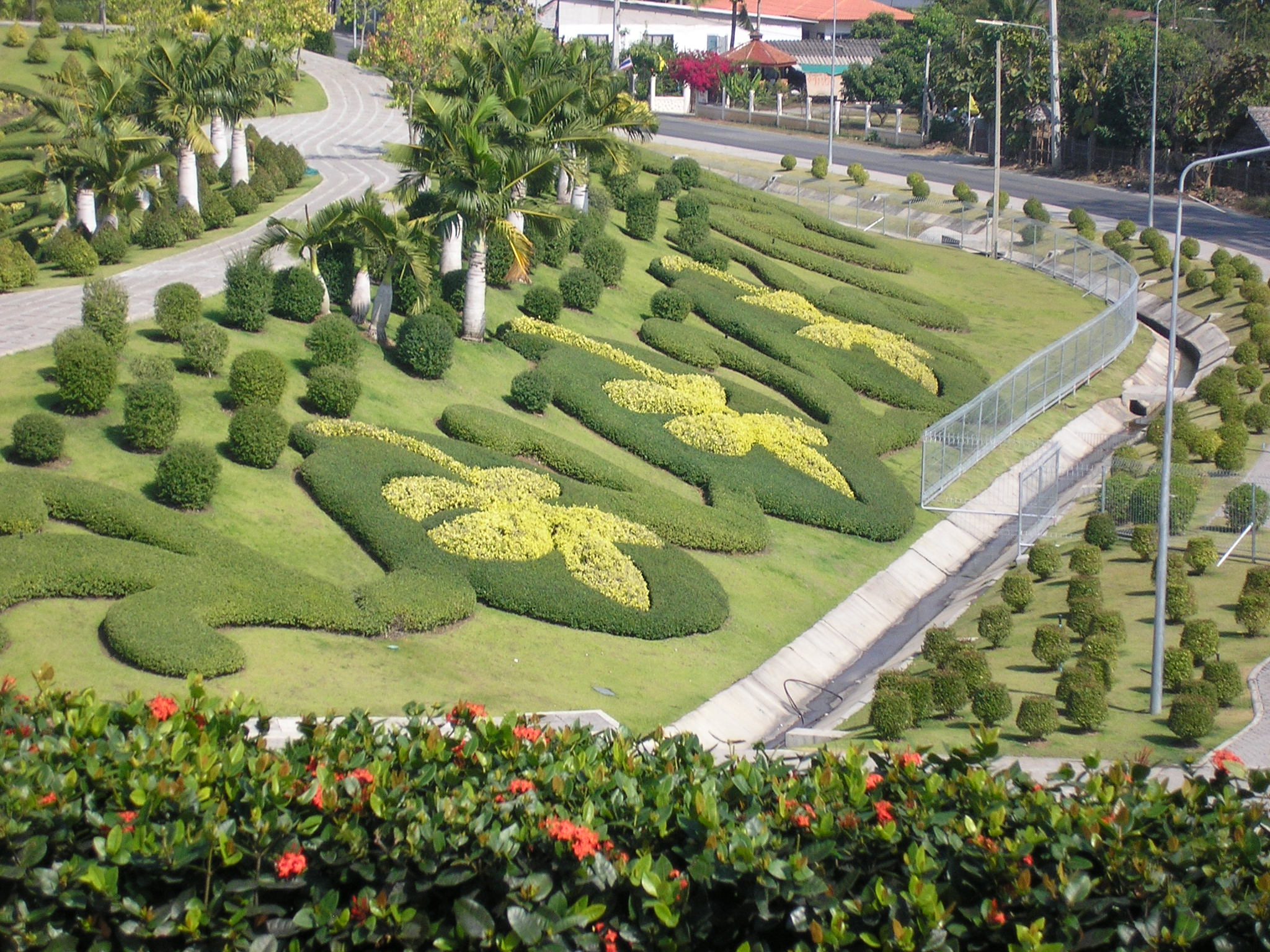
Entrance at Ratchaphruek

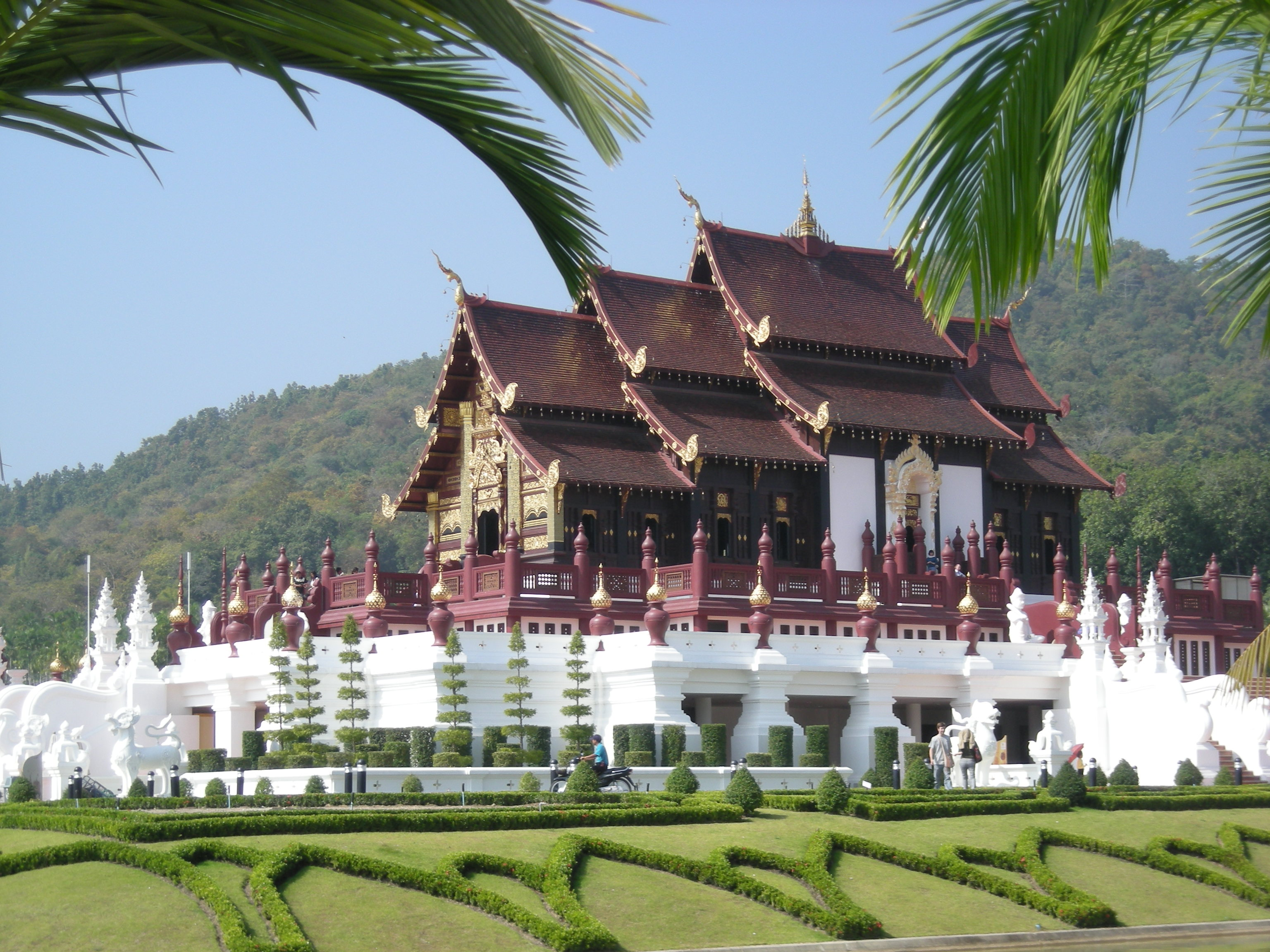
Royal Pavilion

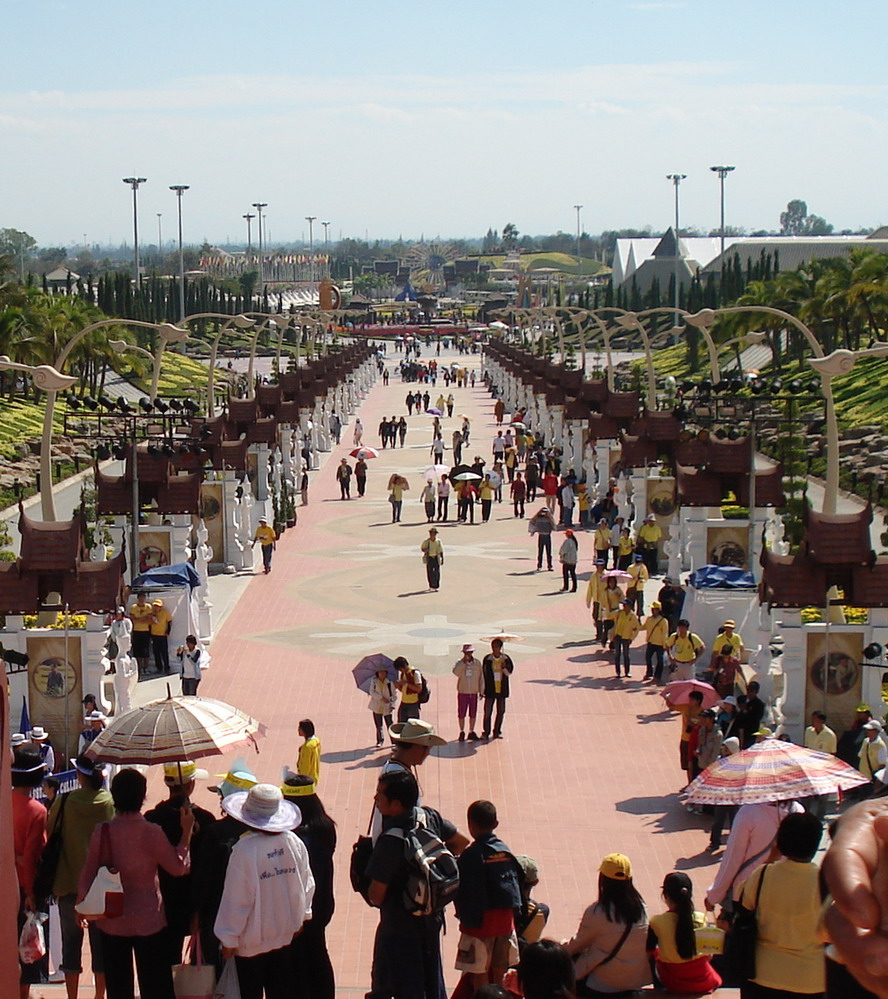
Main Street

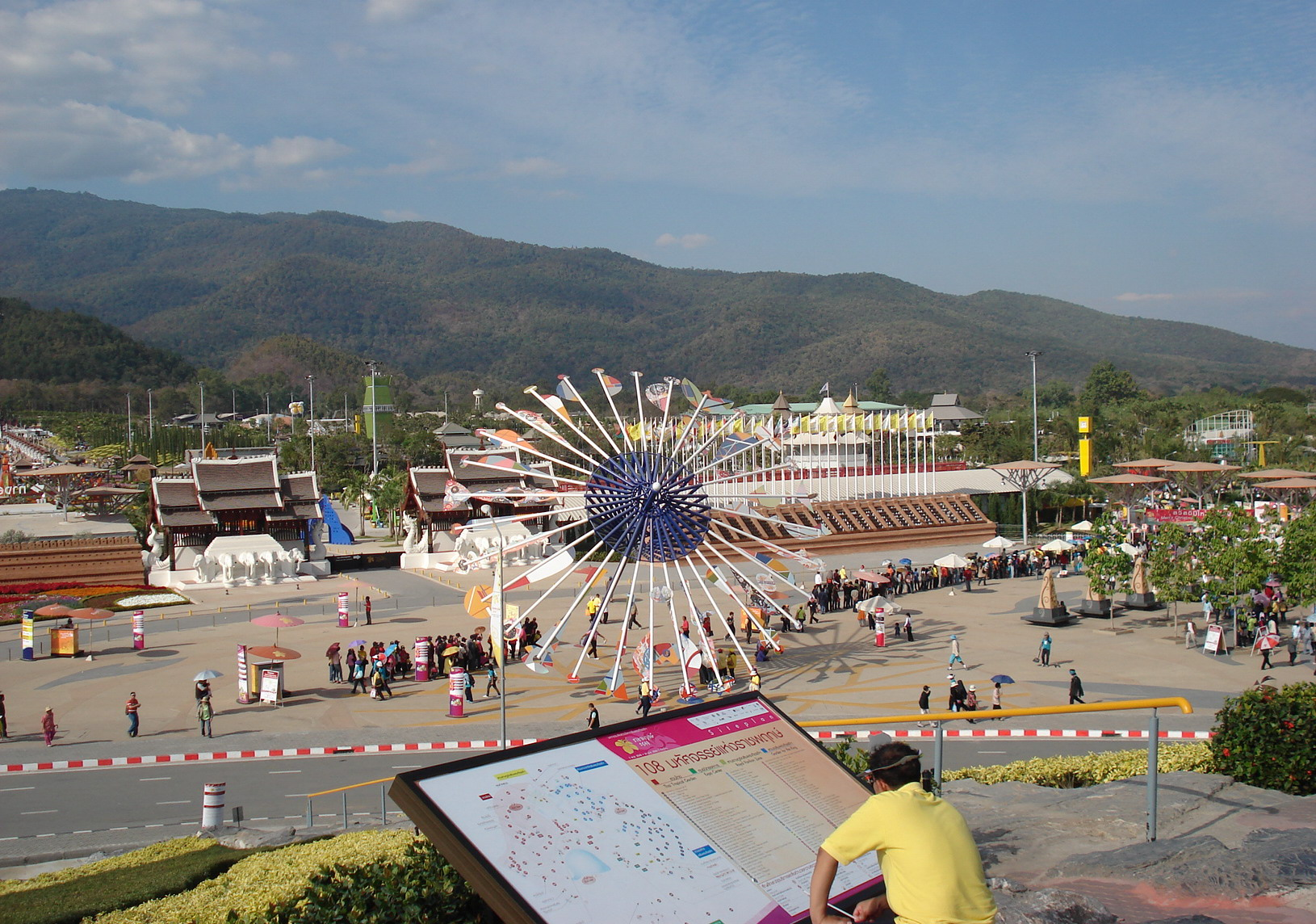
Behind gardens

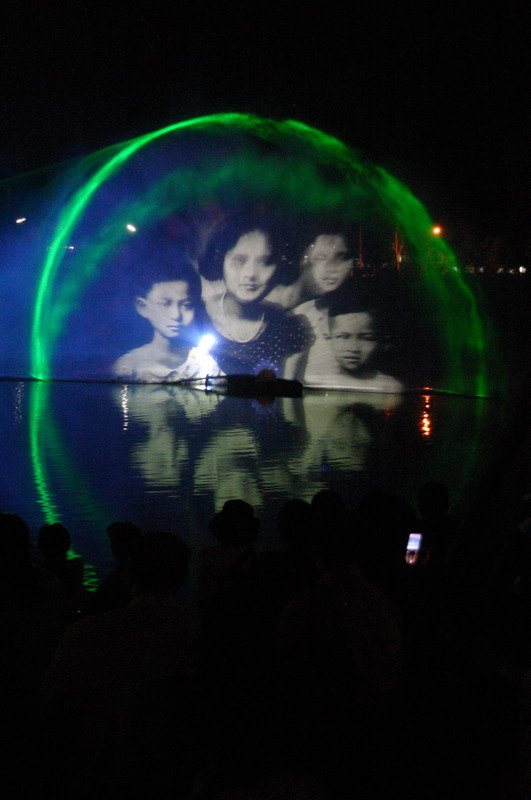
Light and Sound Royal Show

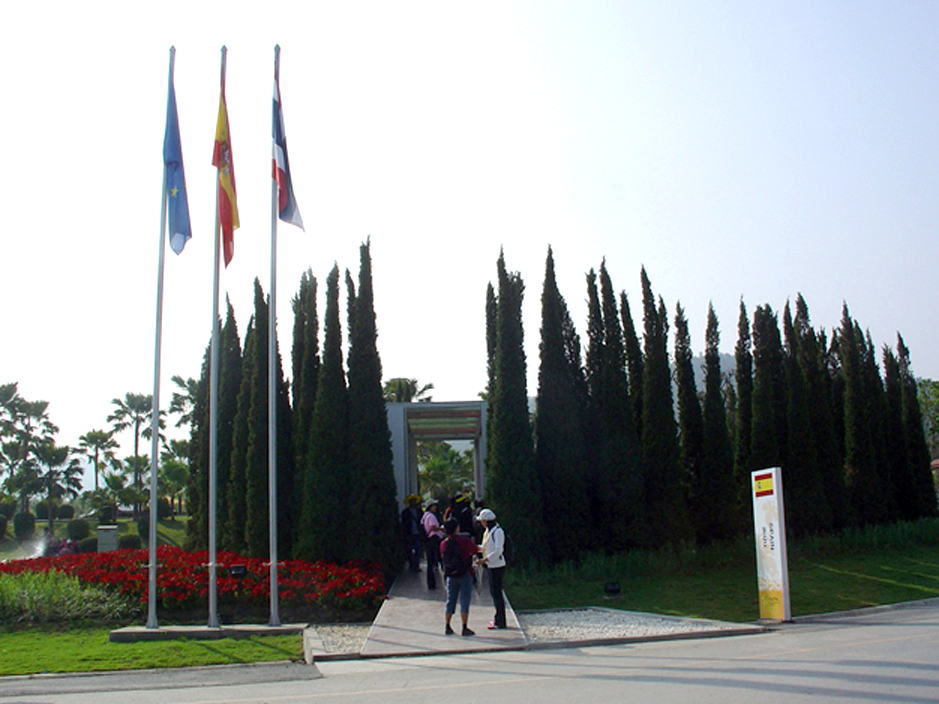
Spain pavilions

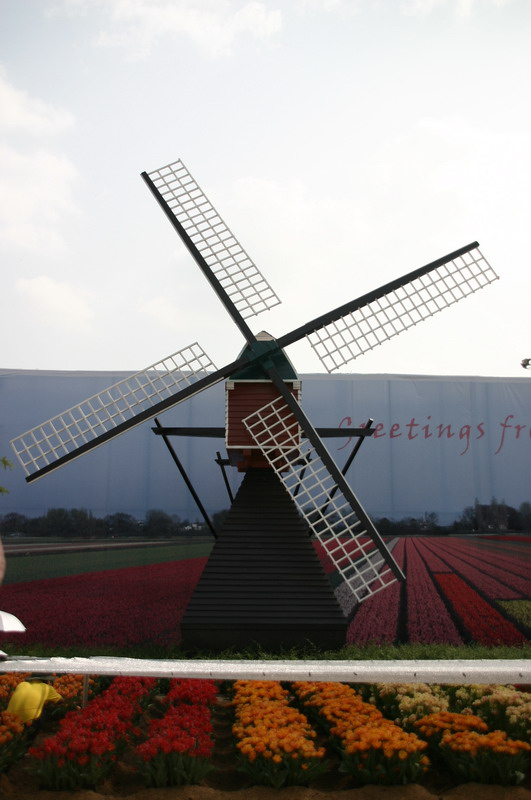
Holland garden

== See also ==
- Expo 2029 in Nakhon Ratchasima
