= Expo 2023 (Doha, Qatar) =

EXPO 2023-2024 Doha
- logo

Overview
- BIE-class: Horticultural exposition
- Name: The Horticultural Expo 2023 Doha
- Motto: Green Desert, Better Environment
- Area: 80

Location
- Country: Qatar
- City: Doha

Timeline
- Awarded: 22 November 2018
- Opening: 2 October 2023
- Closure: 28 March 2024

Horticultural expositions
- Previous: Expo 2022 in Almere
- Next: Expo 2027 in Yokohama

Specialized expositions
- Previous: Expo 2017 in Astana
- Next: Expo 2027 in Belgrade

Universal expositions
- Previous: Expo 2020 in Dubai
- Next: Expo 2025 in Osaka

Internet
- Website: www.dohaexpo2023.gov.qa

Expo 2023 was an international horticultural exhibition hosted by Doha, Qatar. The Horticultural Expo 2023 Doha was held from October 2, 2023 until March 28, 2024. Spanning 1.7 square kilometers, the event took place in Al Bidda Park, one of the biggest parks in Doha which overlooks the Persian Gulf. Originally scheduled to be held from 14 October 2021 to 17 March 2022, the event was rescheduled to 2023 due to the COVID-19 pandemic. The Bureau International des Expositions (BIE) general assembly in Paris formally recognised it on 22 November 2018 as an International Horticultural Exhibition. The expo was organized under the theme "Green Desert, Better Environment". An 80-hectare (200-acre) site was identified.

== Goals ==
The theme of EXPO 2023 Doha, Qatar was "Green Desert, Better Environment". To attain its sustainability objectives, the organizers partnered with the Gulf Organisation for Research & Development (GORD). "Encouraging, inspiring, and educating people about cutting-edge methods to lessen desertification" was the aim. The exhibition was planned to provide a global forum for professionals, non-governmental organizations, decision makers, and participants to discuss the global issue of "Desertification".

The following goals characterized Expo 2023 Doha, Qatar, in line with the Qatar National Vision 2030:

- To hold the first-ever horticultural show in a desert climate.
- To designate Qatar as the center of this concept in order to create a showcase for "The Green City" throughout the Middle East.
- Promote innovative horticulture that takes into account Qatar's soils, water, and climate.
- To highlight Expo 2023 in Doha, Qatar as a driver of foreign direct investment and commercial prospects in Qatar.
- Draw attention to the connections between sport, the environment, and people's health and well being.
- To provide creative solutions that will enable humanity to stop desertification sooner rather than later;
- To create beneficial environmental products that will serve as a legacy for future generations.

=== Qatar National Vision 2030 ===
In alignment with the Qatar National Vision 2030, a strategic blueprint designed to propel Qatar towards achieving sustainable development and becoming a more advanced society by 2030, this particular edition serves as a catalyst for transformative initiatives. It aims to foster global awareness and encourage individual engagement in order to support the goals outlined in the vision. Hosting this gathering is a project that aligns harmoniously with the concurrent endeavors of national sustainability projects. It is a collaborative initiative that seeks to promote and support the principles of sustainability on a national scale. By bringing together stakeholders from various sectors, this gathering aims to foster dialogue, exchange knowledge, and develop innovative solutions to address pressing environmental challenges. The event serves as a platform for sharing best practices, showcasing successful initiatives, and inspiring collective action towards a more sustainable future. Through its inclusive and participatory approach, this project contributes to the broader national sustainability agenda and reinforces the importance of collaborative efforts in achieving long-term environmental goals.

== Rescheduling ==
The organisers approached the BIE to move the opening to 2023, following the delay of Expo 2020 from 2020 to 2021 and a request to do so by the AIPH, and agreement from the government of Qatar. The request was in recognition of challenges facing participating countries during the COVID-19 pandemic.

The BIE's executive committee agreed this rescheduling in principle, meaning that it could be put a vote at the next general assembly on 1 December 2020.

At the general assembly it was agreed that the exposition be held between 2 October 2023 and 28 March 2024, and be called International Horticultural Expo 2023 Doha Qatar during which the country would focus on hosting the FIFA World Cup the year before.

== Participants ==
- Afghanistan
- Algeria
- Angola
- Azerbaijan
- Bangladesh
- Benin
- Bhutan
- Burkina Faso
- Burundi
- Cabo Verde
- Central African Republic
- Chad
- Comoros
- Cuba
- DR Congo
- Ecuador
- Eritrea
- Eswatini
- Ethiopia
- Gambia
- Ghana
- Guinea
- Guinea Bissau
- Haiti
- Iran
- Iraq
- Italy
- Ivory Coast
- Japan
- Jordan
- Kuwait
- Kyrgyzstan
- Lebanon
- Lesotho
- Liberia
- Libya
- Madagascar
- Malaysia
- Mali
- Mauritania
- Mexico
- Myanmar
- Nepal
- Netherlands
- Niger
- Oman
- Pakistan
- Palau
- Palestine
- Peru
- Portugal (withdrew)
- Qatar (Host)
- Rwanda
- Saudi Arabia
- Senegal
- Somalia
- South Korea
- Spain (withdrew)
- Sudan
- Switzerland
- Tajikistan
- Tanzania
- Thailand
- Togo
- Tunisia
- Turkiye
- Turkmenistan
- Uganda
- United Arab Emirates
- United Kingdom
- Uzbekistan
- Vietnam
- Yemen
