= Expo 2027 =

Planned world's fair

2027 Belgrade

Overview
- BIE-class: Specialized exposition
- Category: International Recognized Exhibition
- Name: EXPO 2027
- Motto: Play for Humanity: Sport and Music for All
- Organized by: Danilo Jerinić
- Mascot: Rastko and Milica

Location
- Country: Serbia
- City: Belgrade

Timeline
- Bidding: 28 July 2021
- Awarded: 21 June 2023
- Opening: 15 May 2027
- Closure: 15 August 2027

Specialized expositions
- Previous: Expo 2017 in Astana

Universal expositions
- Previous: Expo 2025 in Osaka
- Next: Expo 2030 in Riyadh

Horticultural expositions
- Previous: Expo 2027 in Yokohama
- Next: Expo 2029 in Nakhon Ratchasima

Internet
- Website: expobelgrade2027.org

Expo 2027 (Serbian: ЕКСПО 2027, romanized: EKSPO 2027) is the working title for a BIE-recognised specialised exposition to be held in 2027 in Belgrade, Serbia. It is scheduled to begin on 15 May and close on 15 August. This will be the first world exposition to be held in the former Yugoslavia.

== Bidding process ==
=== Candidatures ===
Five countries submitted competing candidatures to organise a Specialised Expo in either 2027 or 2028: the United States of America (in Minnesota), Thailand (in Phuket), Serbia (in Belgrade), Spain (in Málaga), and Argentina (in Bariloche).

The candidature list closed on 28 January 2022. Each candidate submitted a detailed candidature dossier by 7 June 2022, and the BIE then organised Enquiry Missions, assessing the feasibility and viability of each candidature project. Serbia was elected as the host country of Specialised Expo 2027/28 by BIE Member States, gathered in the 172nd General Assembly which took place on 21 June 2023.

==== Minnesota ====
Minnesota had previously bid for Expo 2023 with Healthy People, Healthy Planet: Wellness and Well Being for All.

The theme for this bid for 2027 was Healthy People, Healthy Planet and would have been held in Bloomington, Minnesota adjacent to the Mall of America and the Minnesota Valley National Wildlife Refuge, and close to Minneapolis-St. Paul International Airport. The expected number of visitors was 13.3 million.

Minnesota was the first to formally submit their bid on 29 July 2021. A group of BIE officials visited the site in October 2022 to hear presentations that included renderings of proposed structures designed by DLR Group for the expo. This would have been the first World Fair to be held in the Western Hemisphere since Expo 86.

==== Phuket ====
The theme for this bid for 2028 was Future of Life: Living in Harmony, Sharing Prosperity.

==== Belgrade ====
The theme of this winning bid for 2027 is Play for Humanity – Sport and Music for All.

The Minister of Finance, Siniša Mali, was the chairman for the Working Group for the preparation and submission of the bid for Expo 2027. The Expo complex is planned as a multi-functional space, which in addition to the spaces dedicated for the exhibition also contains accompanying commercial and accommodation facilities that will provide logistical support. Serbia is the only country from Southeastern Europe that applied to be the host country of the exhibition.

==== Málaga ====
The theme for this bid for 2027 which would have been called The Urban Era: towards the sustainable city intended to focus on the UN's sustainability goals. If chosen it would have been held between 5 June and 5 September 2027.

It would've taken place in the Buenavista area within the Campanillas district very near the University of Málaga and the Málaga International Airport that has a capacity for 35 million passengers every year. It was the first city to be officially interested in hosting this expo and also the only city that was officially visited by the BIE to examine the proposed terrane and learn more about the project before closing the candidatures.

Expo2027 Málaga had the support of a large part of institutions, entities, associations, federations and companies of the city.

==== San Carlos de Bariloche ====
The theme for this bid for 2027 was Nature + Technology = sustainable energy. A viable future for humanity.

=== Vote ===
A secret ballot took place to select the winner at BIE's 172nd General Assembly on 21 June 2023. The first ballot awarded 54 votes to Belgrade, Málaga were given 42 votes, Minnesota earned 19 votes and Phuket was given 16 votes, with San Carlos de Bariloche gathering only 8 (and 1 abstention). This meant that San Carlos de Bariloche was eliminated. The second ballot awarded Belgrade 69 votes, Málaga was given 48 votes, Minnesota 21 votes, with Phuket gathering only 15 (with 1 abstention), eliminating Phuket. The third ballot awarded Belgrade 74 votes and earned Málaga 53 votes, with Minnesota gathering only 23 votes (and 2 abstentions). This meant Minnesota was eliminated. In the final, fourth round ballot 81 votes were given to Belgrade and 70 to Málaga.

Expo 2027 bidding results
Applicants	Round 1	Round 2	Round 3	Round 4
Serbia – Belgrade	54	69	74	81
Spain – Málaga	42	48	53	70
United States – Minnesota	19	21	23	–
Thailand – Phuket	16	15	–	–
Argentina – Bariloche	8	–	–	–
Abstention	1	1	2	3

== Development ==
=== Organisation ===
On 5 October 2023, the Government of Serbia adopted the decision establishing EXPO 2027 d.o.o. Beograd as the company responsible for organising the exposition. By March 2026, the company was headed by Danilo Jerinić, while Jagoda Lazarević, Minister of Domestic and Foreign Trade, served as Commissioner General for Expo 2027 Belgrade and represented Serbia in relations with the Bureau International des Expositions (BIE) and international participants.

In February 2024, Serbia submitted its Recognition Dossier to the BIE. According to the BIE, the dossier set out the operational dates, legislative and financial measures, the Expo site master plan, the conditions for international participation, and legacy plans for the exposition.

=== Site and master plan ===
Expo 2027 is being developed on a 25-hectare site in Surčin, southwest of central Belgrade, near Nikola Tesla Airport and the Sava river. The exposition complex forms part of a wider urban master plan that also includes a new National Stadium with a capacity of 52,000, an aquatic centre, and the Expo Village, linked by a central landscaped promenade.

The master plan was designed by the Spanish architectural firm Fenwick Iribarren Architects, whose proposal formed the basis of Serbia's successful bid. The site is divided into three main areas: International Pavilions, the Thematic Zone, and the Corporate and Best Practice Area. Structural and facade engineering, landscape planning, and sustainability consulting are being provided by Werner Sobek AG in collaboration with Danilo Dangubic Architects and the Swiss landscape architecture firm VOGT. According to Werner Sobek, the Best Practice Area includes 45 modular timber pavilions arranged on a 9×9 metre grid and designed for disassembly after the exposition.

=== Infrastructure ===
According to the organiser, the estimated cost of Expo 2027 and its directly supporting infrastructure is €1.29 billion. This figure includes the exhibition grounds, the aquatic centre, the Zemun–Airport–Expo rail link, a river dock on the Sava, roads, utilities, and other public infrastructure.

=== Construction progress ===
By May 2024, a BIE technical visit reported that infrastructure works were already under way on the wider master-plan site, including the National Stadium. During a second BIE technical visit in February 2026, BIE Secretary General Dimitri S. Kerkentzes observed full-scale construction on the Surčin site, with the exposition scheduled to open just over 15 months later. At the second International Participants Meeting in March 2026, the organiser stated that the international pavilion units were on schedule to be delivered to participants by December 2026.

=== International participation ===
Expo 2027 is scheduled to run from 15 May to 15 August 2027 under the theme "Play for Humanity: Sport and Music for All". Current BIE material states that the exposition is expected to welcome more than 130 participating countries and more than 6 million visitors, with more than 8,000 events across the 93-day programme.

The first International Planning Meeting was held in Belgrade on 10–11 June 2025 and brought together representatives of more than 110 countries, BIE officials, and the organiser. A second International Participants Meeting was held from 10 to 12 March 2026. The BIE described it as gathering representatives of over 130 countries and international organisations, while the Serbian government said delegates from 138 countries attended. Slovakia became the first country to sign a participation contract in November 2025. Publicly announced participation agreements later included those with Russia in December 2025 and Libya in February 2026.

The exposition has been promoted with brand ambassadors including Usain Bolt and Jackie Chan.

== Controversies ==
=== Legislative framework and procurement concerns ===
In December 2023, the Serbian Parliament enacted a special law governing the organisation of EXPO 2027 (Закон о посебним поступцима ради реализације међународне специјализоване изложбе EXPO Београд 2027; colloquially referred to as the "Lex Specialis"), which exempts all EXPO-related projects from Serbia's Law on Public Procurement, as well as provisions of laws governing expropriation, urban planning, construction safety, and environmental protection. The European Commission's 2025 Serbia Progress Report stated that Serbia "continues to have the tendency to circumvent its legislation in this area through intergovernmental agreements and special laws, including for the implementation of EXPO Belgrade 2027," and noted that the law and its accompanying decree "continue to raise concerns with respect to their compliance with the EU acquis, including as regards legal redress and tender submission deadlines."

Transparency Serbia, a chapter of Transparency International, submitted a challenge to the Constitutional Court of Serbia arguing that Article 14 of the special law—which authorises the government to regulate EXPO procurement by decree—is unconstitutional, on the grounds that it is legally impossible to "more closely regulate" a procedure that the law itself does not regulate at all, and that the government's authority to adopt such a decree is therefore beyond the powers conferred by the Constitution of Serbia. The Democratic Party filed a separate constitutional challenge against an authentic interpretation of the law's provisions, arguing that authentic interpretation was being used to circumvent judicial review and effectively amend legal norms. As of mid-2025, the Constitutional Court had not ruled on either initiative.

=== Financial irregularities ===
The projected total cost of EXPO 2027 preparations has been disputed, with figures ranging between €1 billion and €18 billion depending on which associated infrastructure projects are included under the government's broader "Leap Into The Future" programme. The "Fiscal Council Republic of Serbia". warned that bond issuances totalling €1.3 billion at 7% interest would result in approximately €700 million in interest payments alone. Reported expenditure on the EXPO complex and associated projects reached €762 million during 2024 alone, and the construction cost of the new National Stadium, part of the EXPO masterplan, was reported to have exceeded its €250 million budget by more than €100 million. Observers have noted that the government has created confusion by combining EXPO 2027 infrastructure with other unrelated projects under a single programme, making it difficult to determine the actual cost of the exposition itself.

=== Safety concerns ===
The Lex Specialis permits EXPO facilities to operate without standard use permits for a period exceeding two years, relying on technical inspections conducted by the contractors themselves rather than by independent authorities. These provisions have been criticised in the context of the Novi Sad railway station canopy collapse, in which 16 people died after the canopy of a recently renovated railway station collapsed; subsequent investigations linked the disaster to failures of construction oversight and corruption in public works contracting.

=== Environmental concerns ===
In February 2025, the Serbian Academy of Sciences and Arts (SANU) issued a formal warning stating that the EXPO 2027 construction posed risks of irreversible environmental damage and threatened the integrity of Belgrade's water supply infrastructure. Despite this warning, the government subsequently introduced amendments to existing legislation to bypass environmental impact assessment requirements for EXPO-related construction.

=== Land acquisition ===
The project site was expanded from an initial 119 hectares to 813 hectares—an increase of approximately 684%—without a publicly stated justification. According to Radio Free Europe's Serbian service, land previously privatised by the state was being repurchased at prices reported to be up to 100 times the original sale price.

=== Public and political opposition ===
As of March 2025, over 100,000 citizens of Serbia had signed a petition organised by the Kreni-Promeni civic platform demanding the cancellation of EXPO 2027. Multiple opposition parties—including the People's Movement of Serbia (NPS), New Face of Serbia (NLS), the Freedom and Justice Party (SSP), and the Green–Left Front (ZLF)—formally requested that the Bureau International des Expositions (BIE) cancel the event, citing corruption risks, financial mismanagement, and the exemption of EXPO projects from public procurement law.

=== International responses ===
The European Parliament adopted a resolution in November 2025 calling on all countries participating in EXPO 2027 to take into account "serious concerns and evidence of widespread corruption linked to the ruling authorities," as well as what it described as a reported lack of compliance with basic construction standards and legal requirements in the organisation and construction of the exhibition.

The European Commission's 2025 Serbia Progress Report raised similar concerns, stating that the Lex Specialis and its accompanying decree continue to raise concerns regarding compliance with EU procurement standards, and noting limited progress in transparency for projects contracted under intergovernmental agreements.

May 2026, German opposition party Die Linke submitted "Kleine Anfrage" (minor interpellation) to the federal government, asking a total of 32 questions to the German government. These were predominantly about EXPO, mostly on procurement corruption, legal, ecological issues, but also touched upon the canopy collapse and the so-called "Mrdic laws". The German government responded to a quarter of the questions with the exact same sentence: "The Federal Government has no knowledge of this." On the other hand, related questions were grouped together to receive a single, unified answer. For example, seven questions regarding the participation of German companies in EXPO received only one response.

== Participants ==
As of 10 March 2026, there are 137 countries that have confirmed their participation at Expo 2027, with 80 confirming it in written form. Planned participation is between 120 and 140 countries. Countries which participation was made public are:

- Algeria
- Angola
- Antigua and Barbuda
- Armenia
- Austria
- Azerbaijan
- Bangladesh
- Belarus
- Belize
- Bosnia and Herzegovina
- Burkina Faso
- Burundi
- Cape Verde
- Cameroon
- Central African Republic
- Chad
- China
- Comoros
- Cuba
- Cyprus
- Czech Republic
- Djibouti
- Ecuador
- Equatorial Guinea
- Eswatini
- Ethiopia
- Fiji
- France
- Gabon
- Gambia
- Georgia
- Germany
- Ghana
- Greece
- Grenada
- Guinea
- Guinea-Bissau
- Haiti
- Hungary
- Indonesia
- Iran
- Iraq
- Israel
- Italy
- Japan
- Kazakhstan
- Kiribati
- Kyrgyzstan
- Lesotho
- Liberia
- Libya
- Madagascar
- Malawi
- Maldives
- Mali
- Federated States of Micronesia
- Monaco
- Montenegro
- Mozambique
- Nauru
- Nepal
- Niger
- North Macedonia
- Palau
- Qatar
- Russia
- Saint Lucia
- Saint Vincent and the Grenadines
- São Tomé and Príncipe
- Saudi Arabia
- Serbia (host)
- Seychelles
- Slovakia
- Solomon Islands
- Somalia
- South Africa
- South Korea
- South Sudan
- Sudan
- Suriname
- Switzerland
- Tajikistan
- Tanzania
- Togo
- Tunisia
- Turkey
- Turkmenistan
- Uganda
- United Arab Emirates
- United States
- Uzbekistan
- Vanuatu
- Venezuela
- Yemen
- Zambia
- Zimbabwe
