= Game day recycling =

Recycling program

Game day recycling is the idea that having large crowds of people in a small, concentrated space will generate a great deal of refuse and products that require recycling. A home football game at a college with a high-capacity stadium can attract up to 110,000 people. However, because colleges only play a limited number of games at home throughout each season, the game-day recycling programs are usually specialized and separated from the school's regular recycling program.

Campuses primarily implement programs to deal with the considerable amount of trash and recycling generated by fans and to ensure sustainability. Furthermore, tailgaters bring copious amounts of food and refreshments, producing the most waste during a game day. Moreover, inside the stadium, programs, concessions, beverages, and vending machine items also contribute significantly to the total waste.

== Current Campus Programs ==
=== Harvard ===
Harvard began its sustainability efforts when a panel of students and faculty began meeting in 1999 to discuss ways the campus could become more green. The "Harvard Green Campus Initiative" began in 2001, which led to a greater need for a more central office for sustainability efforts. The Harvard Office for Sustainability was established in the fall of 2008 and now oversees the game day recycling program.

Harvard's game day recycling program is supported by Harvard, the Office for Sustainability, and the President's office. On game days, Harvard provides "clearstream" bags, recycling bins, safety vests, gloves and “tailgate bags” for volunteers. The Office for Sustainability recruits employees who have environmental knowledge, produced a game day recycling video and recruits volunteers for game days and other stadium events. The President's Office encourages all the departments to cut carbon and be green, and the president attends all game days. Harvard participated in the EPA's Game Day Challenge in its first two years, 2009 and 2010. (See below).

=== University of Colorado ===
The University of Colorado established its recycling program in 1976. The recycling center works with many departments and student groups to accomplish its mission. It operates as a partnership between facilities management (run by the administration) and the student union.

Ralphie's Green Stampede was formed in 2008 to deal specifically with game day recycling. It is a zero waste and carbon reduction program that began at Folsom Field during football games and now has expanded to include the Coors Events Center and all of CU's sporting events. Its goal is to reach zero waste at the stadium. Folsom Field provides cups and food containers made from compostable materials and has “zero-waste” stations throughout the stadium. It was the first major sports stadium in the nation to run a zero-waste process.

The CU game day recycling program's accomplishments, which were outlined in its report to the EPA's GameDay Challenge include having an 80-90 percent diversion, no public trashcans, about 25 attended zero-waste stations, more than 90 percent compostable or recyclable packaging and high and broad support. The program involves its vendors for large events, encouraging them to provide packaging made with eco-friendly materials, compost their food waste, use bulk condiment dispensers, instruct their employees in proper recycling practices, and track and report their annual progress. Ralphie's Green Stampede also provided equipment, signage, and posters to encourage and facilitate recycling.

=== University of Florida ===
The University of Florida TailGator Green Team was established in 2006 to manage waste at the Ben Hill Griffin Stadium during game days. It works to collect recyclable products generated by the masses of people surrounding the stadium while tailgating. The TailGator gameday recycling program relies on volunteers to operate. In its first year, it diverted over 26,500 pounds from the landfill. Since that first year, the Green Team has collected 62.34 tons of trash, which greatly reduced the waste produced on gamedays. Along with managing waste, the TailGator Green Team works to educate students on the proper ways of recycling. The team works in areas with high student concentrations based on where tailgates and other gameday events are occurring to tell individuals how and what to recycle.

== EPA involvement ==
The EPA is a government agency whose purpose is to ensure the safety of humans and their environment. The EPA has implemented a Game Day Challenge in an effort to reduce the amount of waste accumulated during college football games. This Challenge is an initiative of the EPA's WasteWise program. WasteWise is a free partnership program that assists its collaborators in meeting their specific goals to reduce and recycle industrial and municipal solid wastes. As part of the Game Day Challenge, colleges across the country compete to determine which university can reduce, reuse and recycle the most waste. Participating colleges and universities have the opportunity to design and implement a waste reduction program for one home football game during the month of October. The schools need to measure the results by tracking and recording data on the amount of waste generated at the football game, the number of recyclables collected and the total number of people in attendance at the game. Once numbers are reported by the schools, the EPA announces the results and winners during the month of November.

The overall purpose of the Game Day Challenge is to reduce the amount of waste produced at college football games. The program hopes to increase awareness and expand participation by students, faculty, and the entire school community in waste reduction programs in an effort to make college campuses more sustainable.

=== History ===
The Game Day Challenge began in 2009 and eight schools participated. The eight schools that participated were:

1. Auburn University
2. Brigham Young University
3. Harvard University
4. North Carolina State University
5. Ohio University
6. University of Colorado
7. University of Michigan
8. West Virginia University

By the 2010 challenge, the number of participating schools greatly increased. The number rose from 8 to 88 universities competing in the Game Day Challenge. The 2010 schools are:

1. Alcorn State University
2. Appalachian State University
3. Auburn University
4. Baylor University
5. Bowling Green State University
6. Brigham Young University
7. Bucknell University
8. California Polytechnic State University
9. Central Connecticut State University
10. Central Michigan University
11. Clemson University
12. Duke University
13. Eastern Michigan University
14. Eastern Washington University
15. Fairmont State University
16. Florida A & M University
17. Georgia Institute of Technology
18. Harding University
19. Harvard University
20. Illinois State University
21. Indiana University
22. Iowa State University
23. Ithaca College
24. Kansas State University
25. Lackawanna College
26. Loras College
27. Louisiana State University
28. Marietta College
29. Marist College
30. Mesa Community College
31. Middle Tennessee State University
32. Montana State University
33. North Carolina State University
34. Northwest Missouri State University
35. Northwestern University
36. Ohio University
37. Oregon State University
38. Princeton University
39. Purdue University - ICA
40. Rice University
41. Rutgers University
42. Southern Illinois University Carbondale
43. Southern Methodist University
44. Syracuse University
45. The Florida State University
46. The Ohio State University
47. The University of Alabama
48. The University of Arkansas, Fayetteville
49. The University of Central Oklahoma
50. The University of Rhode Island
51. The University of Tulsa
52. Union College
53. University at Buffalo
54. University of California, Berkeley
55. University of California, Davis
56. University of Central Florida
57. University of Florida
58. University of Georgia
59. University of Kentucky
60. University of Maine
61. University of Maryland
62. University of Miami
63. University of Michigan
64. University of Minnesota
65. University of Mississippi
66. University of Missouri
67. University of Montana
68. University of Nebraska–Lincoln
69. University of North Carolina - Chapel Hill
70. University of North Texas
71. University of Notre Dame
72. University of Oregon
73. University of Rochester
74. University of South Florida
75. University of Tennessee - Knoxville
76. University of Tennessee at Martin
77. University of Texas
78. University of Virginia
79. University of Washington
80. Vanderbilt University
81. Virginia State University
82. Virginia Tech
83. Washington State University
84. West Virginia University
85. West Virginia Wesleyan College
86. Western Kentucky University
87. Western New England College
88. Yale University

=== Categories ===
The EPA divided the competition into five categories and awards are presented for each category:

1. Waste Generation: The Waste Generation category determines the ranks of schools by their per capita weight of waste generated. This is calculated by measuring the total waste produced, which includes trash, recyclables and compostables and dividing it by the total attendance at the game. This figure is the amount of waste that is produced per person at the game. The university with the lowest per capita waste generation wins the waste generation category.
2. Diversion Rate: The Diversion Rate category ranks schools based on their recycling rate, which is measured by comparing the amount of waste recycled to the total waste produced. The winner of this category is the school that has the largest recycling rate.
3. Greenhouse Gas Reduction: This category ranks schools based on their reductions in greenhouse gas emissions. As waste sits in municipal landfills, greenhouse gases are emitted into the atmosphere. However, when waste is recycled, these greenhouse gas emissions are reduced. The total reductions in emissions that are identified with the schools waste reduction accomplishments are calculated using the EPA's WARM factors that are programmed in the WasteWise Re-TRAC system. The greenhouse gas reductions are divided by the total game attendance, in order to get a number for the greenhouse gas emission reductions per person. The school with the highest greenhouse gas reduction rate wins.
4. Recycling: The Recycling category ranks schools by the amount of material recycled per person. The weight of recycled material including paper, plastic, glass and cardboard will be totaled and divided by the number of people in attendance at the game. The winner of this category is the school that has the highest recycling rate.
5. Organics Reduction: Organics Reduction category bases their ranking on the per capita weight of reduced organics. The overall weight of reduced organics, which incorporates compostable materials that are either donated, reused, or composted will be divided by the number of people attending the game. The winner of this category is the school with the highest organic reduction rate.

=== Results for the 2009 EPA GameDay Challenge ===
In 2009, more than 40,000 pounds of waste were reduced through the combined efforts of the eight schools. This is equal to reducing greenhouse gas emissions by more than 105 metric tons. This number is comparable to the amount of greenhouse emissions that are produced annually from the consumption of about 12,000 gallons of gasoline or equal to the annual emissions generated from about 4,400 propane cylinders used to fuel gas grills.

The University of Colorado placed first in the categories of Diversion Rate, Gross Green House Gas Reductions through Waste Reduction and Per Capita Composting. Ohio University ranked first in Per Capita Waste Generation. Harvard University took the first place rank in Per Capita Recycling.

The results from the 2010 Game Day Challenge will be posted on the EPA website on November 30, 2010.

== See also ==
- Green sport event
