= Gulf Organisation for Research and Development =

The Gulf Organisation for Research and Development (GORD) is a Research and Development (R&D) entity targeting United Nations Sustainable Development Goals (SDGs) on multiple fronts with a focus on environmental sustainability. GORD worked as the sustainability partner for the FIFA World Cup Qatar 2022. It is leading the official Qatar Chapter of the Association of Energy Engineer (AEE). Founded in 2009 by Dr. Yousef Alhorr, GORD is also chairing the GSO Technical Committee for Sustainable Buildings (TC17) in GCC Standardization Organization (GSO). The committee is chartered for developing a regional code consolidating green buildings related standards and schemes. For its initiatives aimed at accelerating climate solutions, GORD has partnered with UN agencies including, UNESCO, UNEP and UNFCCC. GORD is also the sustainability partner of the International Horticultural Expo 2023 Doha.

Headquartered in Qatar Science and Technology Park (QSTP), GORD's research activities involve RDI in areas of energy efficiency and ecofriendly building materials. Among key outcomes of GORD's research activities is the development of Synergia 7n1, which is a hybrid cooling system that is designed for enclosed and open spaces with minimal carbon footprint compared to traditional air conditioning units.

GORD is the certification body for Global Sustainability Assessment System (GSAS), which is the Gulf region's fastest growing green building rating system for new projects. By providing ecolabeling, performance testing and accreditation services, GORD is working to enhance the visibility of ecologically responsible products and services. GORD's advisory services cover areas related to sustainability and climate change. The organization also engages in knowledge dissemination and capacity building through workshops, conferences and community engagement programs.

The organization is collaborating with leading global and regional organizations including Cisco, ASHRAE, Kuwait Public Authority for Housing Welfare, and a range of leading entities in Qatar including banks to promote ESG and green finance solutions.
