= Global Sustainability Assessment System =

Architecture rating in Africa

The Global Sustainability Assessment System (GSAS) [Originally QSAS] is the first performance-based system in the Middle East and North Africa (MENA) region, developed for assessing and rating buildings and infrastructure for their sustainability impacts. In 2016, FIFA officially endorsed GSAS as the sustainability assessment system for Qatar's eight stadiums set to host the 2022 FIFA World Cup. The primary objective of GSAS is to create a sustainable built environment that minimizes ecological impact and reduces resource consumption while addressing the local needs and environmental conditions specific to the region. GSAS adopts an integrated lifecycle approach for the assessment of the built environment including design, construction and operation phases.

Developed in 2007 by the Gulf Organisation for Research and Development (GORD) in collaboration with the TC Chan Center at the University of Pennsylvania, the School of Architecture at the Georgia Tech Research Institute, and other reputed houses of expertise, GSAS announced its fourth edition in 2019. GSAS manuals are revised on a regular basis to reflect all technical changes and provide relevant information to stay conversant based on best practices, GSAS Trust experience and GSAS users feedback. With GSAS at its core, GORD has built a comprehensive continuum of sustainability that encompasses everything from assessing and rating built-environments to educating and certifying professionals.

GSAS framework is comprehensive and designed to follow an integrated life cycle approach to improve the sustainability performance of the built environment. GSAS addresses the sustainability impacts during the design, construction and operation stages of buildings and infrastructure projects. The framework addresses eight categories of macro and micro level aspects for a multidimensional focus on sustainability. These categories are Urban Connectivity; Site; Energy; Water; Materials; Indoor/Outdoor Environment; Cultural & Economic Value; and Management & Operations. Each GSAS Category is associated with a direct impact on environmental sustainability and/or human well-being and provides indicators to measure different associated aspects. These categories are then sub-divided into specific criteria that measure and define the individual issues. Categories, criteria, and measurements are defined to be performance based and quantifiable, as far as possible.
