= ISO 20121 =

International standard

ISO 20121 (full name: ISO 20121:2012, Event sustainability management systems –- Requirements with guidance for use) is a voluntary international standard for sustainable event management, created by the International Organization for Standardization.

== Background ==
Every event – from a village barbecue to a major sporting event like the Olympics – will have economic, social and environmental impacts. Water and energy resources are put under pressure, significant amounts of waste and carbon emissions can be generated. Sometimes events can put a strain on local communities. By 2005, practitioners within the events industry were becoming aware of the need for more sustainable practices.

Specifically, the Head of Sustainability at the London 2012 Olympic and Paralympic Games, David Stubbs, was looking for a way to make good on the sustainability promises made in the London Games bid.

He raised the issue with the British Standards Institution (BSI) in the UK. This led to the creation of BS 8901:2007 Specification for a sustainable event management system with guidance for use. After a period of review, the second version of BS 8901 was published in 2009.

BS 8901 was received very positively by the international event industry, and was soon being widely used. For example, COP15, the United Nations Conference on Climate Change, was certified as compliant with BS 8901 in December 2009. The Microsoft Corporation achieved certification to BS 8901 at its Microsoft Convergence® 2009 event in New Orleans, Louisiana, in March 2009.

== Development of ISO 20121 ==
Responding to this international enthusiasm for BS 8901, in May 2009 a proposal for an international sustainable event management standard was jointly submitted to the International Organization for Standardization (ISO) by BSI Group and ABNT, the Brazilian national standards body.

Delegations of experts of the national standards institutions of 25 countries developed the standard, with another 10 countries as observers. Eight stakeholder organizations from the event industry, or with a strong interest in sustainability, also participated. Members of the sustainability team of the London 2012 Olympic and Paralympic Games were among the stakeholders who provided input into the development of the standard.

Subsequently, ISO 20121:2012 Event sustainability management systems –- Requirements with guidance for use was published in June 2012.

== How ISO 20121 works ==
The standard provides a framework to help identify the potentially negative social, economic and environmental impacts of events.

== ISO 20121 and the London 2012 Olympics ==
Sebastian Coe, Chair of the London Organising Committee of the Olympic and Paralympic Games commented: "In our bid to host the Olympic and Paralympic Games in London, we pledged to hold the greenest Games of modern times and I am pleased to say we were hugely successful in doing this."

Weymouth and Portland National Sailing Academy reported that as a result of using the standard they achieved cost savings of around 15 per cent through better waste management and electricity optimization. They also enhanced their international reputation as a sports and corporate event venue, and reduced the risk of legislative breaches. Finally, they are demonstrably operating in accordance with the ‘One Planet Living’ principles of sustainable development, which as an organization they aspire to do.

Following an extensive systems assessment, Plaza Athénée Bangkok A Royal Meridien Hotel became the first “ISO 20121 Event Sustainability Management System” hotel in the world. Since the implementation of the system in 2012, the hotel has reduced electricity consumption by 9.4%, water by 5.03%, and paper by 4.9% year-on-year. Carbon footprint profiling revealed a 47.05% reduction in printer ink consumption and a 25.0% l in plastic bottle use.

== History ==
Year	Description
2012	ISO 20121 (1st Edition)

== Use in COP21 ==
ISO 20121 was used in the organization of the 2015 United Nations Climate Change Conferences (COP21) in Paris as part of its sustainability management approach. The standard supported integration of environmental, social and economic considerations into the even planning and operations, including areas such as resource management, stakeholder coordination and impact reduction.

It's application in COP21 is often cited as an example of how structured sustainability management can be used in large-scale international political events.

== See also ==
- Sustainable Event Management
- International Organization for Standardization
- BSI Group
