= Expo 2030 =

Upcoming World Expo in Riyadh, Saudi Arabia

2030 Riyadh
- Logo

Overview
- BIE-class: Universal exposition
- Category: International Registered Exhibition
- Name: Expo 2030
- Motto: Foresight for Tomorrow
- Area: 6 million m^{2}

Location
- Country: Saudi Arabia
- City: Riyadh

Timeline
- Bidding: 29 October 2021
- Awarded: 28 November 2023
- Opening: 1 October 2030
- Closure: 31 March 2031

Universal expositions
- Previous: Expo 2025 in Osaka

Specialized expositions
- Previous: Expo 2027 in Belgrade

Horticultural expositions
- Previous: Expo 2029 in Nakhon Ratchasima
- Next: Expo 2031 in Minnesota

Internet
- Website: www.expo2030riyadh.sa/en

Expo 2030 (Arabic: إكسبو 2030 الرياض) is an upcoming World Expo organized and sanctioned by the Bureau International des Expositions (BIE), which will be held in Riyadh, Saudi Arabia. It will take place for six months during the last quarter of 2030 and the first quarter of 2031, opening 1 October 2030 and closing 31 March 2031, for a total of 181 days. Riyadh will be the second Middle Eastern city to host the Expo after Dubai, United Arab Emirates in 2020.

== Theme ==
The theme for the expo is "Foresight for Tomorrow" with sub-themes of "Technology", "Planet", "Humanity", "Culture", and "Collaboration".

== Candidature process ==
On 29 April 2021, Russia was the first to submit a bid, with a submission for Moscow. This first submission launched the bidding process for this Expo by opening the candidate list. All other countries wishing to organise World Expo 2030 had until 29 October 2021 to submit their own bids, after which the project examination phase started.

On 29 October 2021, BIE confirmed five bids for the Expo 2030:

=== Candidates ===
- Busan, South Korea - The South Korean city entered its candidacy on 23 June 2021 under the theme "Transforming Our World, Navigating Toward a Better Future".
- Riyadh, Saudi Arabia - The Saudi capital entered its candidacy on 29 October 2021 under the theme "The Era of Change: Together for a Foresighted Tomorrow".
- Rome, Italy - The Italian capital entered its candidacy on 28 September 2021 under the theme "People and Territories, Together: Urban Regeneration, Inclusion and Innovation".

=== Withdrawn candidates ===
- Moscow, Russia - The Russian capital entered its candidacy on 29 April 2021 under the theme "Human Progress, Shared Vision for the World of Harmony". The bid withdrew in May 2022 following the Russian invasion of Ukraine.
- Odesa, Ukraine - The Ukrainian city entered its candidacy on 15 October 2021 under the theme "Renaissance. Technology. Future." The bid withdrew in May 2022 following the Russian invasion of Ukraine.

=== Results ===
In the final vote for hosting nation on 28 November, Riyadh, the capital of Saudi Arabia, was elected as the host city of World Expo 2030.

World Expo 2030 bidding results:
Candidates	Nation	Votes
Riyadh	Saudi Arabia	119
Busan	South Korea	29
Rome	Italy	17
None of bid		0
Abstention		17
Total		183

== Transport ==
The Expo 2030 site will be publicly accessible via a 70,000m^{2} Riyadh Metro station located on Line 4, connecting directly to the nearby King Salman International Airport. It iss expected to serve 19,000 passengers an hour during the Expo. The station will be enclosed in a dome 134m in diameter, designed after the Vachellia seyal. There also will be 44,000m^{2}s of green space, and 25% of the station will be solar powered.

== Participants ==
- Azerbaijan
- Bahrain
- France
- Gabon
- Monaco
- Oman
- Pakistan
- Saudi Arabia
- Syria
- United Kingdom
- United States
