= Expo 2029 =

Horticultural expo held in Nakhon Ratchasima province, Thailand

EXPO 2029–2030 Nakhon Ratchasima

Overview
- BIE-class: Horticultural exposition
- Name: Nakhon Ratchasima International Horticultural Expo 2029
- Motto: Nature and Greenery: Envisioning the Green Future
- Area: 109 hectares (269 acres)

Location
- Country: Thailand
- City: Nakhon Ratchasima
- Venue: Kok Nong Rangka, Khong
- Coordinates: 15°21′51.2″N 102°26′13.4″E

Timeline
- Bidding: March 2022
- Awarded: 6 March 2024
- Opening: 10 November 2029
- Closure: 28 February 2030

Horticultural expositions
- Previous: Expo 2027 in Yokohama
- Next: Expo 2031 in Minnesota

Specialized expositions
- Previous: Expo 2027 in Belgrade

Universal expositions
- Previous: Expo 2025 in Osaka
- Next: Expo 2030 in Riyadh

Korat Expo 2029, officially the Nakhon Ratchasima International Horticultural Expo 2029, is an upcoming Category A1 Horticultural Expo sanctioned by the International Association of Horticultural Producers (AIPH) and recognized by the Bureau International des Expositions (BIE). The event will be held in Khong district, Nakhon Ratchasima, Thailand. Scheduled to run for 110 days, the expo will open on 10 November 2029 and conclude on 28 February 2030.

It marks the second time Thailand has hosted a Category A1 horticultural exhibition, following the Royal Flora Ratchaphruek 2006 in Chiang Mai.

== Candidature process ==
On 16 November 2021, the Thai Cabinet approved a proposal by the Thailand Convention and Exhibition Bureau (TCEB) to officially submit bids for three major world fairs: the 2026 Category B Horticultural Expo in Udon Thani, the 2028 Specialised Expo in Phuket, and the 2029 Category A1 Horticultural Expo in Nakhon Ratchasima. Accordingly, the Ministry of Agriculture and Cooperatives (MOAC) submitted the official candidatures for the Category A1 Horticultural Expo to the International Association of Horticultural Producers (AIPH) in March 2022. At the time of submission, Nakhon Ratchasima was the sole registered candidate for the 2029 event.

Following a site inspection by AIPH officials from 12–14 September 2023, Nakhon Ratchasima was formally elected as the host city. The decision was finalized by AIPH Member States during the AIPH Spring Meeting on 6 March 2024.

== Recognition process ==
On 17 February 2026, the Thai Government formally requested recognition for the 2029 Category A1 Horticultural Expo from the Bureau International des Expositions (BIE). The official recognition dossier was submitted by Nikorndej Balankura, Ambassador of Thailand to France, to Dimitri Kerkentzes, Secretary General of the BIE. The event is scheduled to be formally recognized during the 178th BIE General Assembly, to be held in June 2026.

== See also ==
- Royal Flora Ratchaphruek 2006 in Chiang Mai
