= Sustainable event management =

Sustainable event management (also known as event greening) is event management with particular concern for environmental, economic and social issues.

Sustainability in event management incorporates socially and environmentally responsible decision-making into the planning, organisation and implementation of, and participation in, an event. It involves incorporating sustainable development principles and practices in all levels of event organisation, and aims to ensure that an event is hosted responsibly. It represents the total package of interventions at an event, and needs to be done in an integrated manner. Event greening should start at the inception of the project, and should involve all the key role players, such as clients, organisers, venues, subcontractors and suppliers.

== Sport events ==
Event greening is however not only limited to sports events, and other examples include the World Summit on Sustainable Development (WSSD), Johannesburg 2002, and UNFCCC 15th Conference of the Parties (COP15) held in Copenhagen in 2010.

== Monitoring and evaluation ==
Monitoring and evaluation is an essential component of event greening, and should be used to make continuous improvement. A detailed plan needs to be in place to ensure that information is gathered on all aspects of the event – before, during, and also after the event. This ensures that information is available to understand the effects of greening interventions (e.g. to what extent was water used, and how did water-saving measures reduce water use), as well as the potential improvements to future event-greening initiatives.

With large events it is best to ensure an independent report, which complies with international standards, such as the Global Reporting Initiative (GRI). The GRI Event Organizers Supplement provides organizations in the sector with a tailored version of GRI's Reporting Guidelines. It includes the original Guidelines, which set out the Reporting Principles, Disclosures on Management Approach and Performance Indicators for economic, environmental and social issues. The Event Organizers Supplement's capture the issues that matter most for event organizers to be reported on:

- Site selection
- Transport of attendees
- Recruiting and training of the event workforce, participants and volunteers
- Sourcing of materials, supplies and services
- Managing impacts on communities, natural environments, and local and global economies.
- Planning and managing potential legacies
- Accessibility of an event

Germany's giz gives a similar lists of the fields of activity which must be organized and monitored:

- Guest management
- Mobility (sustainable transport)
- Event venues and accommodation
- Sustainable procurement
- Catering
- Energy consumption and climate
- Waste management

The British Standard (BS 8901) has been developed specifically for the events industry with a purpose of helping the industry to operate in a more sustainable manner. The standard defines the requirements for a sustainability event management system to ensure an enduring and balanced approach to economic activity, environmental responsibility and social progress relating to events.

It requires organizations to identify and understand the effects that their activities have on the environment, on society and on the economy both within the organization and the wider economy; and put measures in place to minimize the negative effects. These standards will however be replaced by the International Standard (ISO 20121) for Sustainability Management Systems.

== See also ==
- Event management
- Greenwashing
