= Homogenized cheese =

Polish dairy product

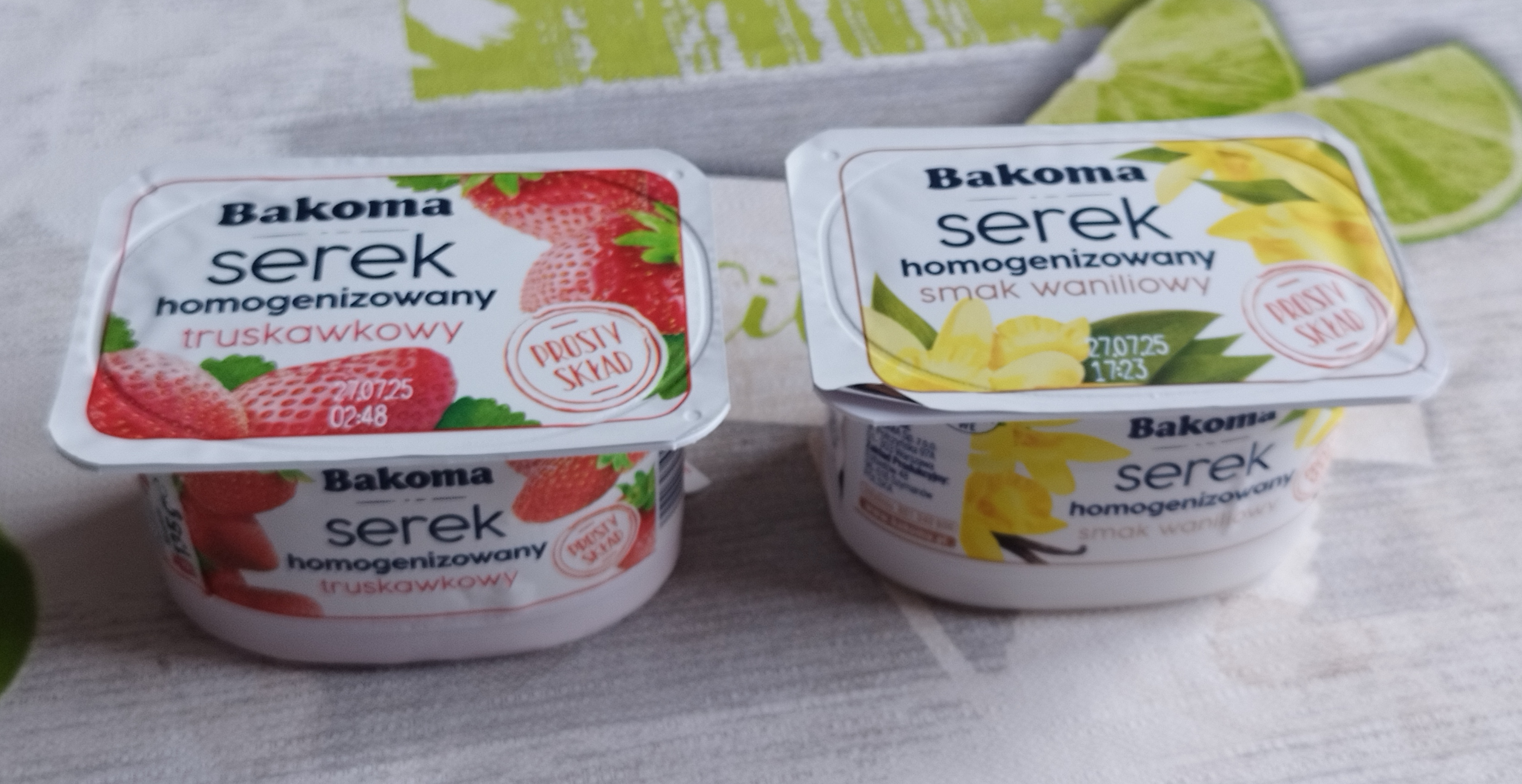
Homogenized cheeses of Bakoma company - strawberry and vanilla flavors

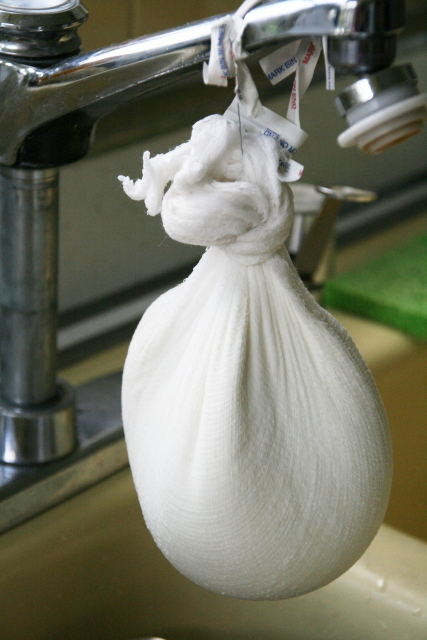
Clotted milk - basic half-product in production of homogenized cheese

Homogenized cheese (

Polish: serek homogenizowany) is a Polish dairy product created from twaróg, often with added cream. It is a non-ripened (fresh) cheese from the group of acid cheeses called twaróg. Other twaróg cheeses in the same category as homogenized cheese are: natural twaróg, cottage cheese, and cream cheese.

Twaróg is created from skimmed milk, which is then coagulated in acid-rennet fashion. The result is coagulum of curd, which is created by casein, which is then dehydrated by spinning. Then, the mix of twaróg and cream is homogenized in homogenisers, which gives the final product its uniform, smooth consistency. By adding cream, the final product receives the desired amount of fats.

Commercially sold homogenized cheeses can be divided into two groups: natural homogenized cheese (without additions) and flavored, often by fruit, chocolate or vanilla. Current-day mass-produced homogenized cheeses often contain thickeners, such as modified starch, pectin, guar gum, xanthan gum, locust bean gum, alginic acid or even gelatine.

According to a 2017 ruling by the Court of Justice of the European Union, the name "serek" (lit. 'little cheese') is to be used exclusively with products based upon animal milk, such as cheese, cream, whipped cream, butter and yogurt.

The marketing of homogenized cheeses is divided by target audience. There are homogenized cheeses produced for children, teens, and adults. Homogenized cheese can be either a snack, or an ingredient of other foods, such as cheesecake.

In Poland homogenized cheeses are produced on industrial scale by at least 15 dairy companies, such as: Mlekpol, Okręgowa Spółdzielnia Mleczarska Krasnystaw and the firm Danone.

== Nutritional value ==
A tub of homogenized cheese

Nutritional value of 100 g of typical natural homogenized cheese is this: 111 kcal, 8 g of proteins, 7 g of fats, 4 g of sugars, 0.1 g of salt. Homogenized cheese also contains phosphorus, magnesium, zinc, copper, manganese and cobalt, as well as vitamins A, B1, B2, D, E and K.
