= Sickle senna =

Sickle senna is a common name for several plants and may refer to:

- Senna obtusifolia
- Senna tora, native to Central America
