= Semen cassiae =

Semen cassiae is the apothecary's name for the seeds of two species of plant used in Traditional Chinese Medicine and may refer to:

- Senna obtusifolia
- Senna tora
