= Cassia gum =

Polysaccharide used as a food additive

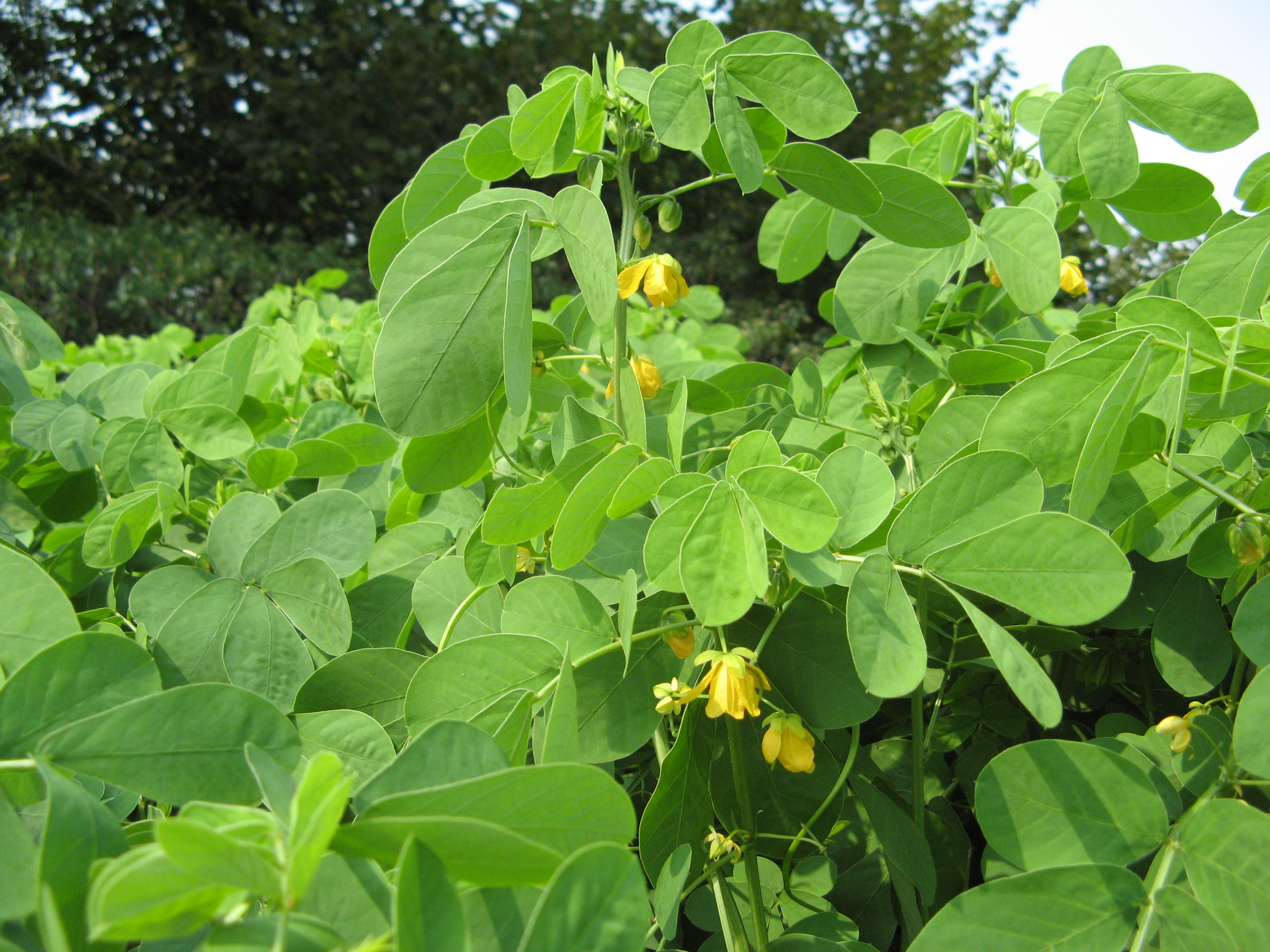
Senna obtusifolia

Cassia gum is the flour and food additives made from the endosperms of the seeds of Senna obtusifolia and Senna tora (also called Cassia obtusifolia or Cassia tora). It is composed of at least 75% polysaccharide, primarily galactomannan with a mannose:galactose ratio of 5:1, resulting in a high molecular mass of 200,000–300,000 Da.

== Approval ==
=== Japan ===
In 1995, cassia gum was added to the list of approved food additives in Japan by the Japanese Ministry of Health and Welfare.

=== United States ===
Two GRAS notices were filed to the U.S. Food and Drug Administration (FDA), one on June 23, 2000 (GRN 51), and one on November 21, 2003 (GRN 139), both of which were not evaluated due to notifier's request to cease evaluation. In June 2008, specialty firm Lubrizol Advanced Material filed a petition to the FDA proposing that food regulations be amended to provide for the use of cassia gum as a stabilizer in frozen dairy desserts. Approval in the US is still pending, with no clear indication of when it may be obtained.

=== European Union ===
In 2010, cassia gum received EU approval for human food applications.

== Uses ==
It is used as a thickener and gelling agent, and has E-number E427 in food and E499 in feed (pet food).
