= Sicklepod tea =

Beverage made using Senna seeds

Gyeolmyeongja-cha
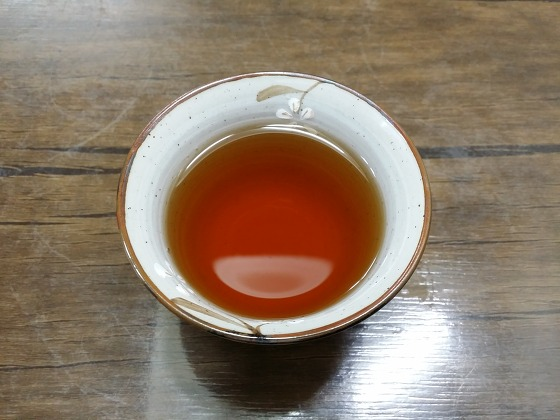
- Type: Tea
- Origin: Korea
- Ingredients: Sicklepod seeds

Korean name
- Hangul: 결명자차
- Hanja: 決明子茶
- RR: gyeolmyeongjacha
- MR: kyŏlmyŏngjach'a
- IPA: [kjʌl.mjʌŋ.dʑa.tɕʰa]

Gyeolmyeongja-cha (Korean: 결명자차; Hanja: 決明子茶) or sicklepod tea is a tea made from roasted (but not ground) seeds of Senna (formerly Cassia) spp., especially S. obtusifolia and S. tora.

== Ingredient ==
The roasted seeds of gyeolmyeongja (결명자; 決明子) are used, this being the Korean name for cassia seeds (Chinese: jué míng zǐ, Japanese: ketsumeishi), i.e., the seeds of the Cassia (Senna) genus of leguminous plants, particularly S. obtusifolia and S. tora.

One source however identifies the ingredient as a plant related to Cassia nomame, synonymous with Chamaecrista nomame.

== Preparation ==
About 20–30 grams (0.71–1.06 oz) of dried sicklepod seeds are roasted, and decocted in around 600 millilitres (21 imp fl oz; 20 US fl oz) of water. Sugar or honey is not added.

== Use ==
The name gyeolmyeongja means "the seed that brightens the eyes". Gyeolmyeongja-cha is also used as herbal medicine.

== Similar beverages ==
In Japan, the habu-cha originally referred to an infusion of roasted cassia seeds brewed from habusō or S. occidentalis, but the habu-cha now commercially sold is usually made from S. obtusifolia.

The aforementioned Chamaecrista nomame is called kawara-ketsumei (カワラケツメイ; literally 'riverbank sicklepod') in Japan, and its leaves and seeds into hot beverages called mame-cha (豆茶) or hama-cha (浜茶), especially in southern regions such as Kyushu.

Cassia seed tea is consumed not only in East Asia (China, Japan, Korea), but in Southeast Asia (Thailand, etc.) as well. In Thailand, S. ora is called chum het thai (ชุมเห็ดไทย); the roasted seeds are used as diuretic, and the seeds or leaves as purgative.

Cassia tora seeds which are roasted and ground have been noticed as ersatz coffee in India, and C. occidentali also brewed into what used to be called "negro coffee" in Africa, South America, and the West Indies. The leaves have also been used for substitute coffee in India, though unflavorful.

== See also ==
- Roasted grain beverage
