= Calycomyza =

Scientific classification
- Kingdom: Animalia
- Phylum: Arthropoda
- Class: Insecta
- Order: Diptera
- Family: Agromyzidae
- Subfamily: Phytomyzinae
- Genus: Calycomyza; Hendel, 1931

Type species
- Phytomyza artemisiae Kaltenbach, 1856

Genus of flies

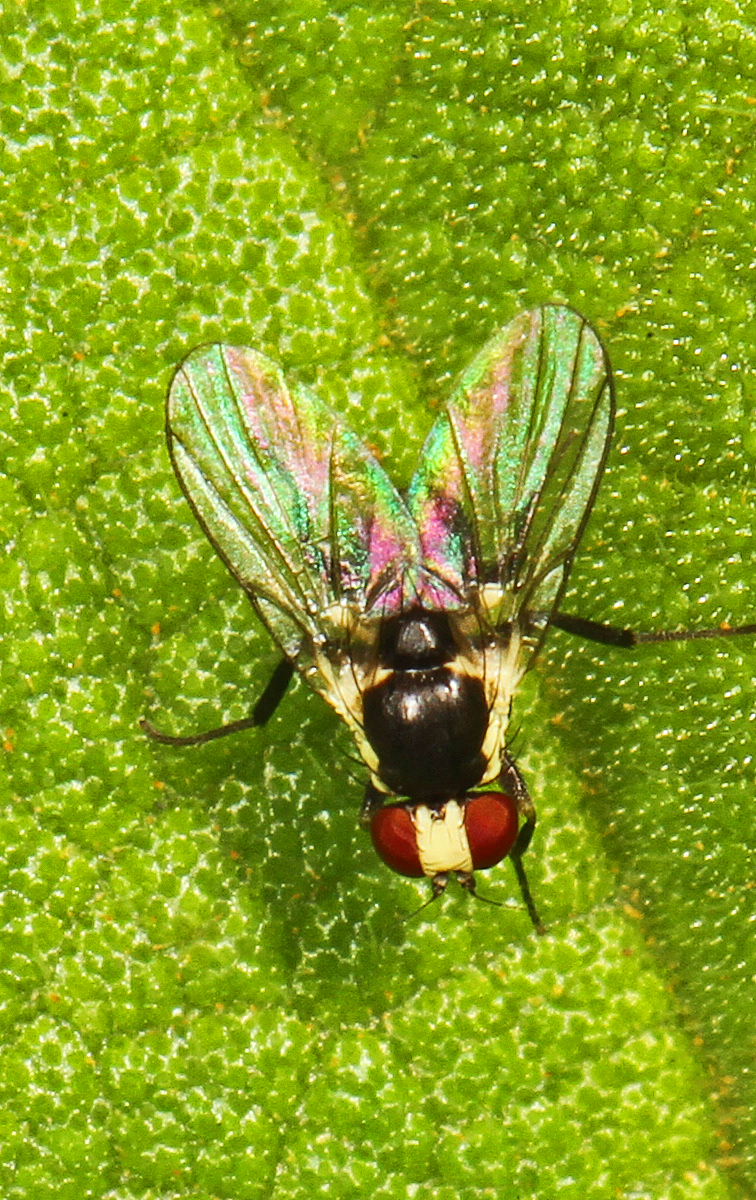

Calycomyza is a genus of flies in the family Agromyzidae.

== Species ==
- Calycomyza addita Spencer, 1983
- Calycomyza ambrosiae (Frick, 1956)
- Calycomyza arcuata Zlobin, 1996
- Calycomyza artemesivora Eiseman & Lonsdale, 2018
- Calycomyza artemisiae (Kaltenbach, 1856)
- Calycomyza avira Eiseman & Lonsdale, 2018
- Calycomyza bahamarum Spencer, 1973
- Calycomyza barbarensis Spencer, 1981
- Calycomyza bicolor Sasakawa, 1996
- Calycomyza breweri Valladares, 1981
- Calycomyza caguensis Spencer, 1973
- Calycomyza cassiae (Frost, 1936)
- Calycomyza chilena Spencer, 1982
- Calycomyza chinensis Chen & Wang, 2003
- Calycomyza colombiana Sasakawa, 1992
- Calycomyza compositana Spencer, 1973
- Calycomyza crotalarivora (Spencer, 1963)
- Calycomyza cruciata Valladares, 1992
- Calycomyza cuspidata Sasakawa, 1992
- Calycomyza cynoglossi (Frick, 1956)
- Calycomyza devia Spencer, 1973
- Calycomyza dominicensis Spencer, 1973
- Calycomyza dryas Moneiro & Esposito, 2017
- Calycomyza durantae Spencer, 1973
- Calycomyza ecliptae (Spencer, 1963)
- Calycomyza egregia (Spencer, 1963)
- Calycomyza enceliae Spencer, 1981
- Calycomyza eupatoriphaga Eiseman & Lonsdale, 2018
- Calycomyza eupatorivora Spencer, 1973
- Calycomyza exquisita (Spencer, 1963)
- Calycomyza flavinotum (Frick, 1956)
- Calycomyza flavomaculata (Spencer, 1960)
- Calycomyza flavoscutellata Sasakawa, 2013
- Calycomyza frickiana Spencer, 1986
- Calycomyza genebrensis Esposito & Prado, 1993
- Calycomyza gigantea (Frick, 1956)
- Calycomyza grenadensis Zlobin, 1996
- Calycomyza humeralis (Roser, 1840)
- Calycomyza hyptidis Spencer, 1966
- Calycomyza hyptisicola Spencer, 1973
- Calycomyza illustris Spencer, 1973
- Calycomyza insolita Martinez, 1992
- Calycomyza ipomaeae (Frost, 1931)
- Calycomyza ipomoeaphaga Martinez, 1992
- Calycomyza ipomoensis Esposito, 1994
- Calycomyza irreperta (Spencer, 1963)
- Calycomyza irwini Spencer, 1981
- Calycomyza jamaicana Zlobin, 1996
- Calycomyza jucunda (Wulp, 1867)
- Calycomyza jucundacea (Blanchard, 1954)
- Calycomyza lantanae (Frick, 1956)
- Calycomyza longicauda (Blanchard, 1954)
- Calycomyza majuscula (Frick, 1956)
- Calycomyza malvae (Burgess, 1880)
- Calycomyza melantherae Spencer, 1966
- Calycomyza menthae Spencer, 1969
- Calycomyza michiganensis Steyskal, 1972
- Calycomyza mikaniae Spencer, 1973
- Calycomyza minor Spencer, 1973
- Calycomyza mystica Martinez, 1992
- Calycomyza novascotiensis Spencer, 1969
- Calycomyza obscura Spencer, 1973
- Calycomyza opaca Zlobin, 1996
- Calycomyza orientalis Spencer, 1986
- Calycomyza palmaris Spencer, 1973
- Calycomyza parallela Sasakawa, 2005
- Calycomyza parilis Spencer, 1973
- Calycomyza perplexa Martinez, 1992
- Calycomyza platyptera (Thomson, 1869)
- Calycomyza polygonicola Sasakawa, 1998
- Calycomyza promissa (Frick, 1956)
- Calycomyza pseudotriumfettae Etienne & Martinez, 2002
- Calycomyza punctata Sasakawa, 1992
- Calycomyza richardsi (Spencer, 1963)
- Calycomyza rolandrae Moneiro & Esposito, 2017
- Calycomyza servilis Spencer, 1973
- Calycomyza sidae Spencer, 1973
- Calycomyza solidaginis (Kaltenbach, 1869)
- Calycomyza sonchi Spencer, 1969
- Calycomyza steviae Spencer, 1973
- Calycomyza subapproximata (Sasakawa, 1955)
- Calycomyza triumfettae Etienne, 1997
- Calycomyza turbida Sasakawa, 1994
- Calycomyza unicampensis Esposito & Prado, 1993
- Calycomyza urania Martinez, 1992
- Calycomyza vallicola Sasakawa, 1992
- Calycomyza verbenae (Hering, 1951)
- Calycomyza verbenivora (Spencer, 1963)
- Calycomyza verbesinae (Spencer, 1963)
- Calycomyza vogelmanni Eiseman & Lonsdale, 2018
- Calycomyza wedeliae Korytkowski, 2014
- Calycomyza yepezi Spencer, 1973
