= Calycomyza cynoglossi =

Scientific classification
- Kingdom: Animalia
- Phylum: Arthropoda
- Class: Insecta
- Order: Diptera
- Family: Agromyzidae
- Subfamily: Phytomyzinae
- Genus: Calycomyza
- Species: C. cynoglossi

Binomial name
- Calycomyza cynoglossi (Frick, 1956)

Synonyms
- Phytobia cynoglossi Frick, 1956

Species of fly

Calycomyza cynoglossi is a species of fly in the family Agromyzidae.

== Distribution ==
Indiana.
