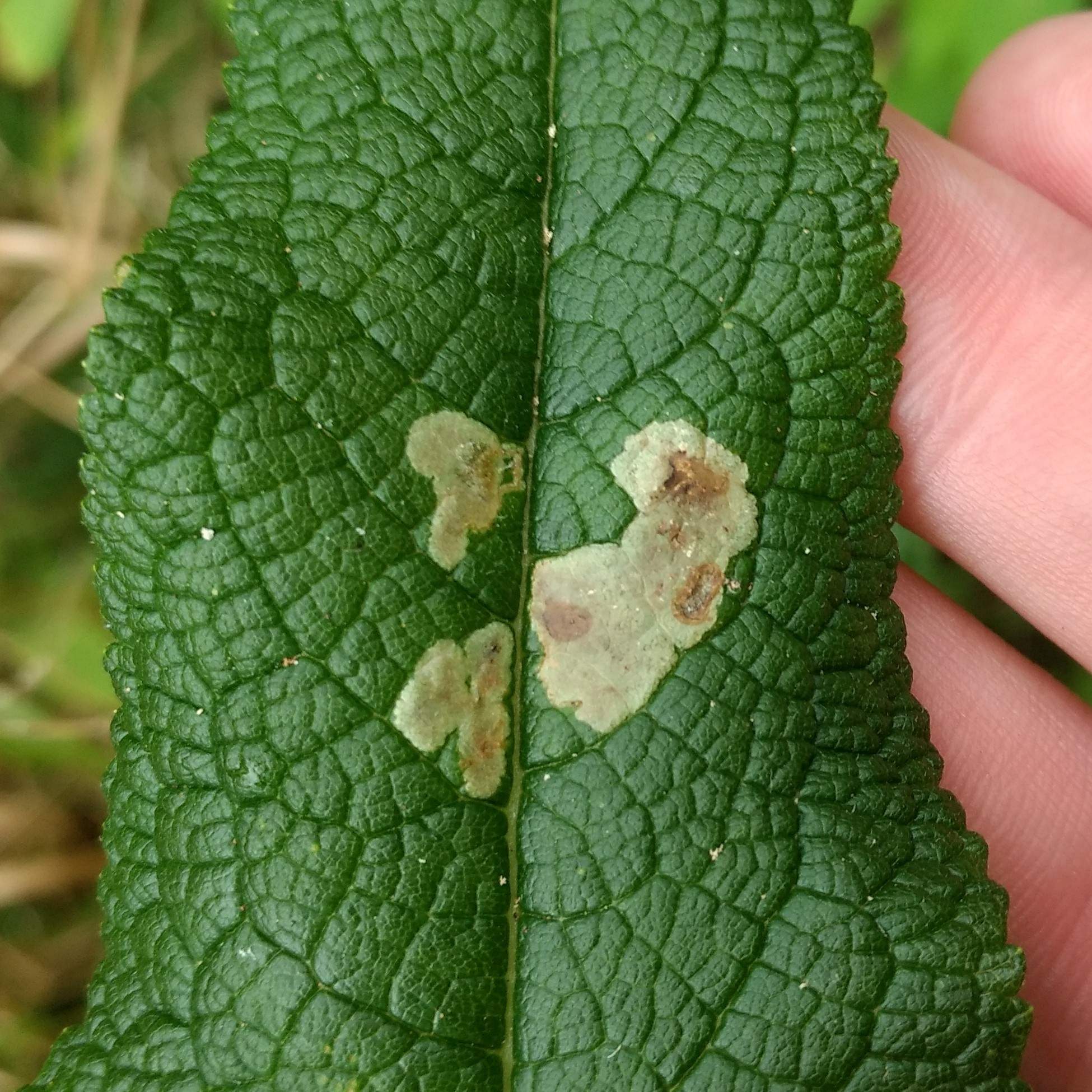
- Blotch mine on Eupatorium perfoliatum

Scientific classification
- Kingdom: Animalia
- Phylum: Arthropoda
- Class: Insecta
- Order: Diptera
- Family: Agromyzidae
- Subfamily: Phytomyzinae
- Genus: Calycomyza
- Species: C. flavinotum

Binomial name
- Calycomyza flavinotum (Frick, 1956)

Synonyms
- Phytobia flavinotum Frick, 1956

= Calycomyza flavinotum =

Species of fly

Calycomyza flavinotum is a species of fly in the family Agromyzidae. It creates whitish blotch-shaped mines on the leaves of Ageratina altissima, Arctium minus (lesser burdock), Eupatorium spp., Eutrochium maculatum (spotted Joe Pye weed), and Eutrochium purpureum (purple Joe Pye weed), all flowering plants in the sunflower family.

== Distribution ==
United States, Jamaica, Venezuela, Brazil.
