= Calycomyza ipomaeae =

Scientific classification
- Kingdom: Animalia
- Phylum: Arthropoda
- Class: Insecta
- Order: Diptera
- Family: Agromyzidae
- Subfamily: Phytomyzinae
- Genus: Calycomyza
- Species: C. ipomaeae

Binomial name
- Calycomyza ipomaeae (Frost, 1931)

Synonyms
- Agromyza ipomaeae Frost, 1931

Species of fly

Calycomyza ipomaeae is a species of fly in the family Agromyzidae.

== Distribution ==
Canada, United States, West Indies, Brazil.
