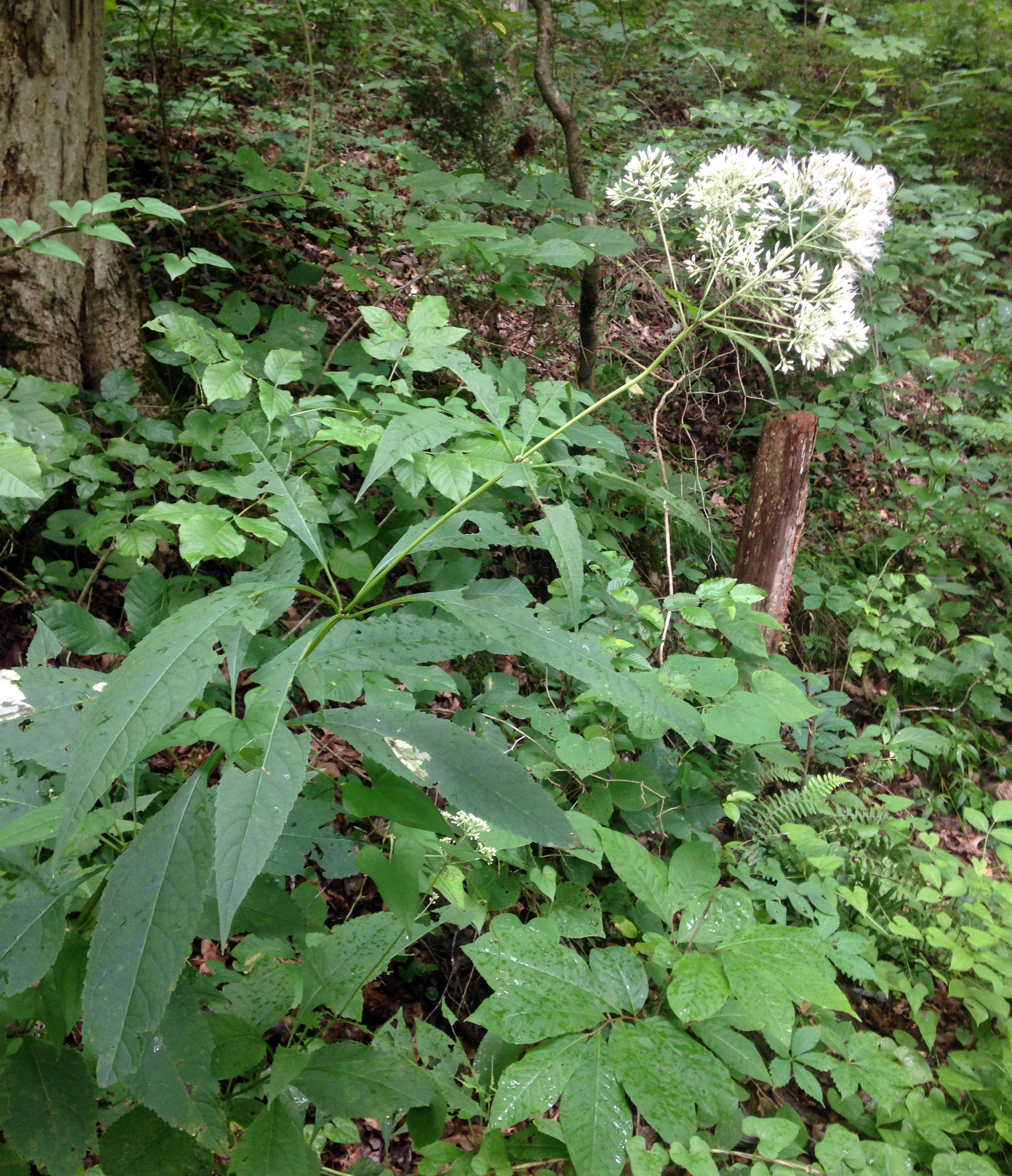

Conservation status
- Secure (NatureServe)

Scientific classification
- Kingdom: Plantae
- Clade: Tracheophytes
- Clade: Angiosperms
- Clade: Eudicots
- Clade: Asterids
- Order: Asterales
- Family: Asteraceae
- Genus: Eutrochium
- Species: E. purpureum

Binomial name
- Eutrochium purpureum (L.) E.E. Lamont

Synonyms
- Eupatorium purpureum L.; Eupatorium falcatum Michx.; Cunigunda purpurea (L.) Lunell; Eupatoriadelphus purpureus (L.) R.M. King & H. Rob.

= Eutrochium purpureum =

Species of flowering plant

Eutrochium purpureum, commonly known as sweet Joe Pye weed, sweet-scented Joe Pye weed or purple Joe Pye weed, is an herbaceous perennial plant in the family Asteraceae. It is native to eastern and central North America, from Ontario east to New Hampshire and south as far as Florida, Louisiana, and Oklahoma.

== Description ==
Eutrochium purpureum is a clump-forming herb that grows to 1.5–2.4 meters (4.9–7.9 ft) tall and about 1.2 meters (3.9 feet) wide. Plants are found in full sun to part shade in mesic to wet soils. Stems are upright, thick, round, and purple, with whorls of leaves at each node. As the plant begins to bloom the stems often bend downward under the weight of the flowers. The leaves grow to 30 cm (12 in) long and have a somewhat wrinkled texture. The purplish flowers are produced in large loose, convex shaped compound corymbiform arrays. Plants bloom mid to late summer and attract much activity from insects that feed on the nectar produced by the flowers.

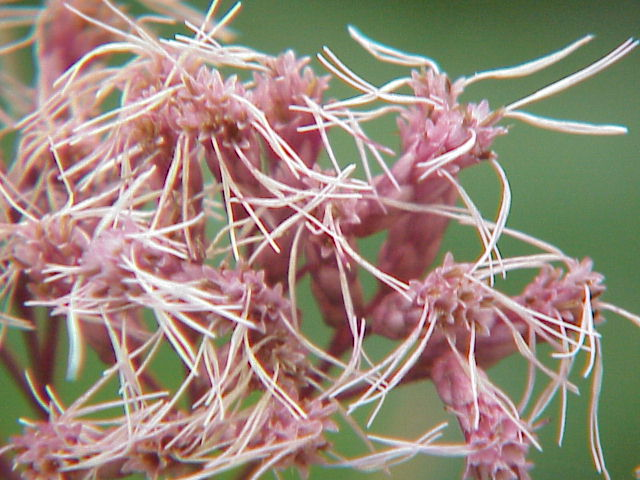
Close-up of the flowers

== Taxonomy ==
Eutrochium purpureum shows a high amount of variability, and up to two or three varieties are currently recognized by current botanical authorities. They differ based in leaf shape, leaf pubescence, and achene glandularity. The precise delineation of these varieties is difficult due to integration between them. The commonly recognized varieties are:

- Eutrochium purpureum var. carolinianum – Southeastern Piedmont
- Eutrochium purpureum var. holzingeri – Midwestern U.S.
- Eutrochium purpureum var. purpureum – Widespread in eastern North America

This species hybridizes readily with other species of Eutrochium and where this species and those species overlap in distribution the resulting plants can be difficult to resolve to a specific taxon.

== Ecology ==
Many species of butterflies, moths, bees, and flies visit the flowers.

It is larval host to the eupatorium borer moth (Carmenta bassiformis), the red groundling moth (Perigea xanthioides), the ruby tiger moth (Phragmatobia fuliginosa), and the three-lined flower moth (Schinia trifascia).

The larvae of Calycomyza flavinotum, a leaf miner fly, create blotch-shaped mines on the leaves.

== Cultivation ==
Like other Joe Pye weed (Eutrochium) species, Eutrochium purpureum is cultivated as an ornamental landscape plant, and has escaped from cultivation in parts of New Zealand. E. purpureum and E. maculatum (spotted Joe Pye weed) are sometimes confused with each other or treated interchangeably in the gardening world due to their similar appearance.
