= Kawal (food) =

Sudanese food using fermented leaves

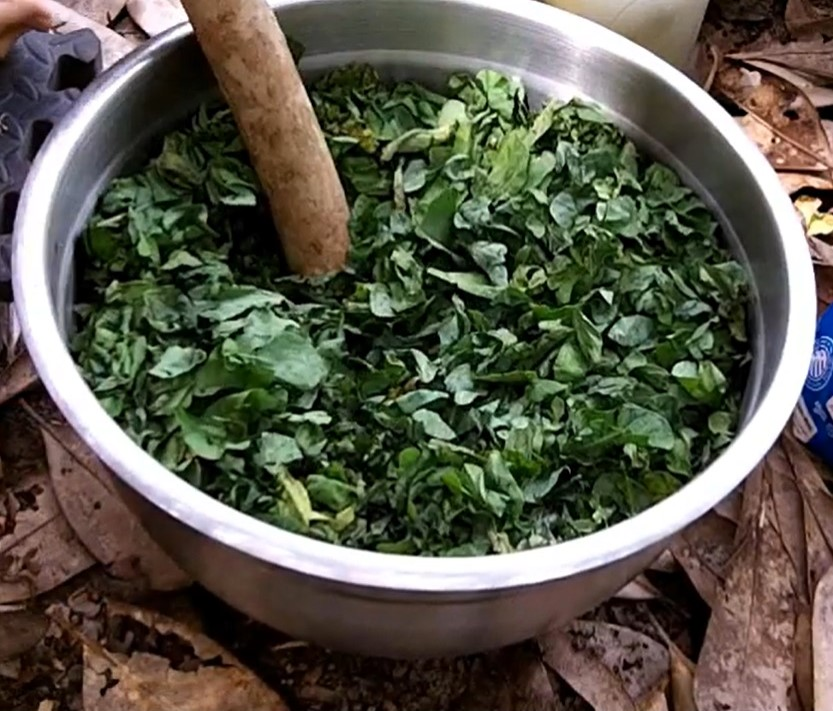
Obtusifolia being pounded

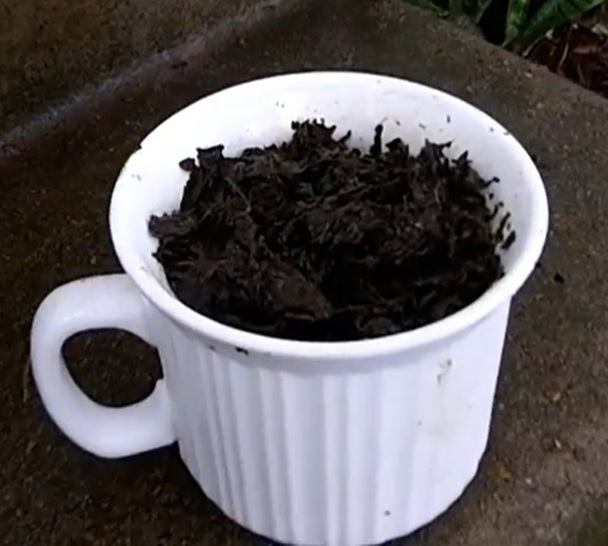
After 2-3 months fermentation

Kawal being prepared in the Southern United States in 2019

Kawal (Arabic: الكول) is food made of fermented leaves used as a meat substitute indigenous to western Sudan, in particular the Kordofan and Darfur provinces, and eastern Chad. In urban areas, it is used as a condiment, similarly to black pepper. It is also used by low-income families as a primary protein source, substituting or extending meat or fish in stews and sauces. It is created from the fermented leaves of Cassia obtusifolia, a toxic wild legume also known as the kawal plant.

It has a pungent odor which persists on the hands; it is said that "when you eat [kawal] with your right hand, you smell it on your left." For this reason, the elite of Sudan consider it a low-status food. In spite of this, kawal has spread across Sudan, possibly due to the plant's ability to grow vigorously in a variety of environments.

Similar fermented meat substitutes found in this region include furundu, which is made from the seeds of Hibiscus sabdariffa, and sigda, which is made with sesame seed cakes.

== Preparation ==
To prepare kawal, C. obtusifolia leaves are harvested during the plant's fruiting and flowering stage, which corresponds to the rainy season of western Sudan. The leaves are then cleaned and pounded into a paste, which is packed inside a zeer. This paste must then be covered with fresh sorghum leaves and weighed down with clean stones. The zeer is then sealed with mud. Every three days, the paste is mixed, then re-covered and the jar resealed. After 15 days, the paste is removed, formed into balls, and sun-dried for five days. The balls of mature kawal can be stored and used as needed.

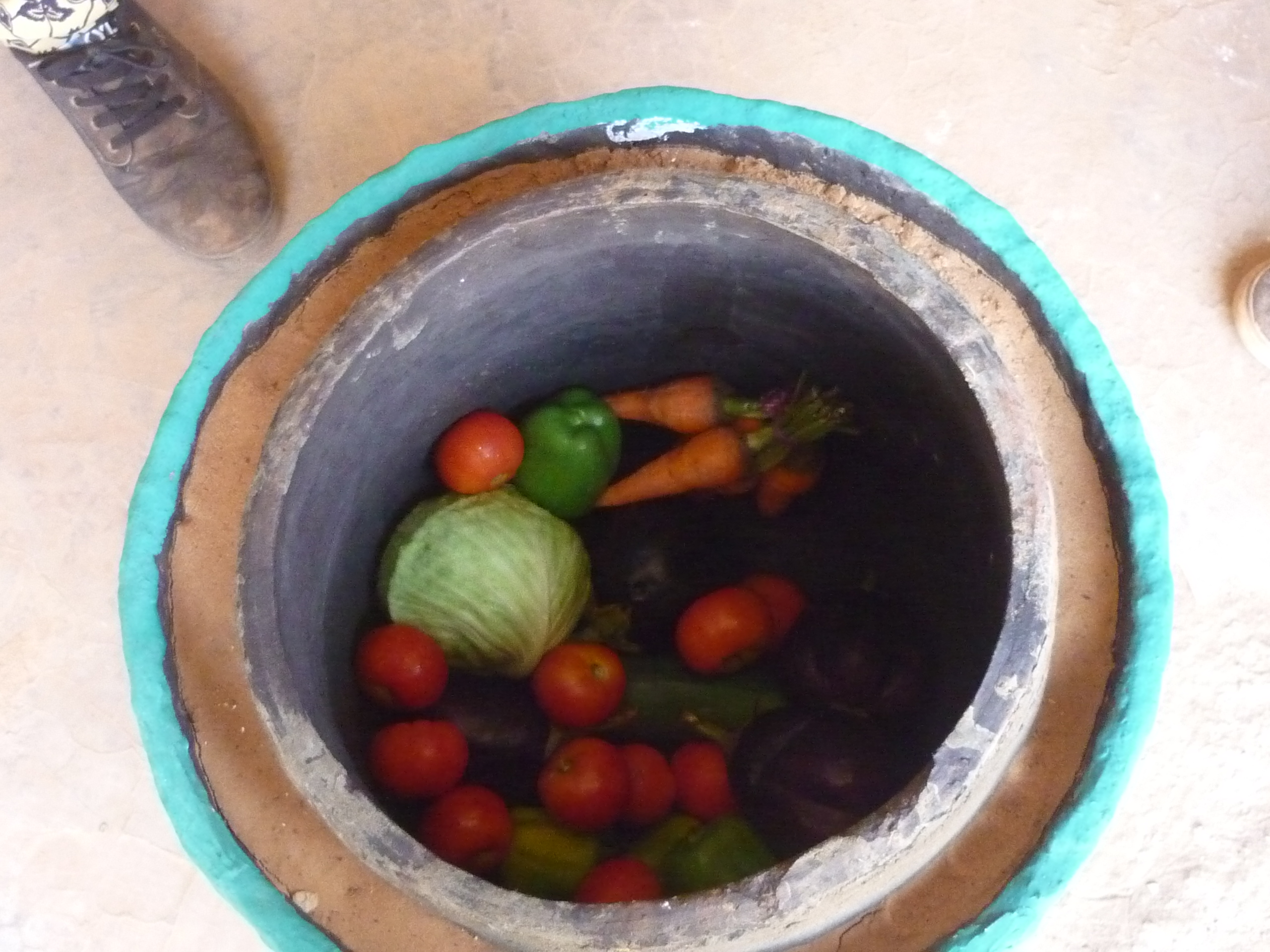
A zeer, filled with vegetables (not kawal)

Like furundu and sigda, kawal serves as a flavoring in Sudanese foods typically flavored with meat. Specifically, its unique odor is similar to the most common type of meat used in this region, sun-dried strips of jerky called shermute. This is as opposed to fermented foods like rob-heb, made with fermented watermelon seeds, and rob-ful, made with fermented peanuts, which serve as substitutes for stews flavored with soured milk such as mulah-rob, a soured milk and lamb stew.

A common preparation of kawal is as a substitute for powdered shermute in a stew of onions, dried okra powder, oil, salt, and pepper, accompanied with a sorghum porridge. Among the Fur people, kawal is known as a nutritious food comparable to meat. The Nuba people makes soup with kawal and bone broth. In cities where meat can be found more easily, powdered kawal is used as a condiment similar to black pepper.

== Nutrition ==
Kawal is approximately 20 percent protein by weight. It has a high content of potassium and calcium.

== Research ==
There has been research into kawal's potential as an accessible protein source in areas with protein shortages. The microbiota involved in its fermentation have also been analyzed and quantified.

== See also ==
- List of condiments
