= Galactomannan =

Class of plant and fungal polysaccharides consisting of mannose and galactose monomers

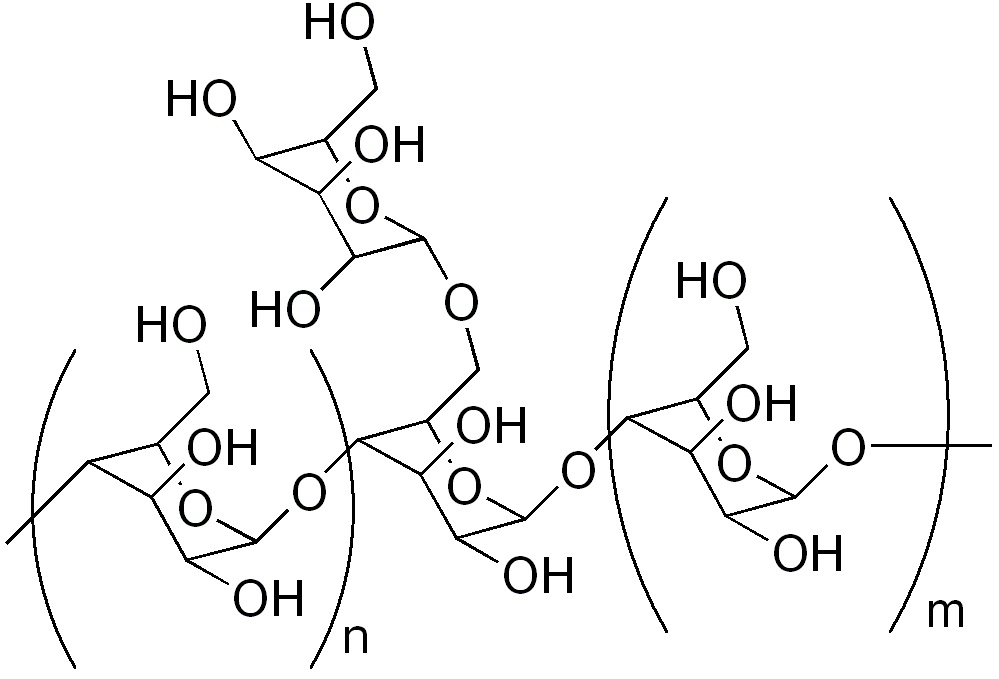
A segment of galactomannan showing mannose backbone (below) with a branching galactose unit (top)

Galactomannans are polysaccharides consisting of a mannose backbone with galactose side groups, more specifically, a (1-4)-linked beta-D-mannopyranose backbone with branchpoints from their 6-positions linked to alpha-D-galactose, (i.e. 1-6-linked alpha-D-galactopyranose).

In order of increasing number of mannose-to-galactose ratio:

- fenugreek gum, mannose:galactose ~1:1
- guar gum, mannose:galactose ~2:1
- tara gum, mannose:galactose ~3:1
- locust bean gum or carob gum, mannose:galactose ~4:1
- cassia gum, mannose:galactose ~5:1

Galactomannans are often used in food products to increase the viscosity of the water phase.

Guar gum has been used to add viscosity to artificial tears, but is not as stable as carboxymethylcellulose.

== Food use ==
Galactomannans are used in foods as stabilisers. Guar and locust bean gum (LBG) are commonly used in ice cream to improve texture and reduce ice cream meltdown. LBG is also used extensively in cream cheese, fruit preparations and salad dressings. Tara gum is seeing growing acceptability as a food ingredient but is still used to a much lesser extent than guar or LBG. Guar has the highest usage in foods, largely due to its low and stable price.

== Clinical use ==
As galactomannan is a component of the cell wall of the mold Aspergillus and it is released during hyphal growth, detection of galactomannan in blood or bronchoalveolar lavage (BAL) fluid is used to diagnose invasive aspergillosis infections in humans. This is performed with monoclonal antibodies in a double-sandwich ELISA; this assay from Bio-Rad Laboratories was approved by the FDA in 2003 and is of moderate accuracy. The assay is most useful in patients who have had hemopoietic cell transplants (stem cell transplants). False positive Aspergillus Galactomannan test have been found in patients on intravenous treatment with some antibiotics or fluids containing gluconate or citric acid such as some transfusion platelets, parenteral nutrition or PlasmaLyte.
