= Calycomyza enceliae =

Scientific classification
- Kingdom: Animalia
- Phylum: Arthropoda
- Class: Insecta
- Order: Diptera
- Family: Agromyzidae
- Subfamily: Phytomyzinae
- Genus: Calycomyza
- Species: C. enceliae

Binomial name
- Calycomyza enceliae Spencer, 1981

Species of fly

Calycomyza enceliae is a species of fly in the family Agromyzidae.

== Distribution ==
California.
