= Calycomyza lantanae =

Scientific classification
- Kingdom: Animalia
- Phylum: Arthropoda
- Class: Insecta
- Order: Diptera
- Family: Agromyzidae
- Subfamily: Phytomyzinae
- Genus: Calycomyza
- Species: C. lantanae

Binomial name
- Calycomyza lantanae (Frick, 1956)

Synonyms
- Phytobia lantanae Frick, 1956

Species of fly

Calycomyza lantanae is a species of fly in the family Agromyzidae.

== Distribution ==
United States, Mexico, Puerto Rico, Grenada, Trinidad, Venezuela, Australia, Papua New Guinea, Malaysia.

== Hosts ==
Lantana camara.
