= Calycomyza artemisiae =

Scientific classification
- Kingdom: Animalia
- Phylum: Arthropoda
- Class: Insecta
- Order: Diptera
- Family: Agromyzidae
- Subfamily: Phytomyzinae
- Genus: Calycomyza
- Species: C. artemisiae

Binomial name
- Calycomyza artemisiae (Kaltenbach, 1856)

Synonyms
- Agromyza atripes Zetterstedt, 1860; Calycomyza marcida Spencer, 1969; Phytomyza artemisiae Kaltenbach, 1856

Species of fly

Calycomyza artemisiae is a species of fly in the family Agromyzidae.

== Distribution ==
Europe, Canada, Guatemala, Colombia.

== Host ==
Artemisia vulgaris.
