= Calycomyza humeralis =

Scientific classification
- Kingdom: Animalia
- Phylum: Arthropoda
- Class: Insecta
- Order: Diptera
- Family: Agromyzidae
- Subfamily: Phytomyzinae
- Genus: Calycomyza
- Species: C. humeralis

Binomial name
- Calycomyza humeralis (Roser, 1840)

Synonyms
- Agromyza atripes Brischke, 1881; Agromyza bellidis Kaltenbach, 1874; Agromyza humeralis Roser, 1840

Species of fly

Calycomyza humeralis, the aster leafminer, is a species of fly in the family Agromyzidae.

== Distribution ==
Canada, United States, Europe, Hawaii, Japan, Africa, India, Australia, Fiji, Jamaica, Brazil, Argentina.
