= Calycomyza promissa =

Scientific classification
- Kingdom: Animalia
- Phylum: Arthropoda
- Clade: Pancrustacea
- Class: Insecta
- Order: Diptera
- Family: Agromyzidae
- Subfamily: Phytomyzinae
- Genus: Calycomyza
- Species: C. promissa

Binomial name
- Calycomyza promissa (Frick, 1956)

Synonyms
- Phytobia promissa Frick, 1956

Species of fly

Calycomyza promissa, Randalls Island, New York, NY, USA

Calycomyza promissa is a species of fly in the family Agromyzidae.

== Distribution ==
Canada, United States.

== Hosts ==
Symphyotrichum ascendens, Symphyotrichum chilense, Symphyotrichum drummondii, Symphyotrichum ericoides, Symphyotrichum lateriflorum, Symphyotrichum oolentangiense, Symphyotrichum pilosum, Symphyotrichum praealtum, Symphyotrichum puniceum.
