= Calycomyza frickiana =

Scientific classification
- Kingdom: Animalia
- Phylum: Arthropoda
- Class: Insecta
- Order: Diptera
- Family: Agromyzidae
- Subfamily: Phytomyzinae
- Genus: Calycomyza
- Species: C. frickiana

Binomial name
- Calycomyza frickiana Spencer, 1986

Species of fly

Calycomyza frickiana is a species of fly in the family Agromyzidae.

== Distribution ==
United States.
