= Calycomyza verbenae =

Scientific classification
- Kingdom: Animalia
- Phylum: Arthropoda
- Class: Insecta
- Order: Diptera
- Family: Agromyzidae
- Subfamily: Phytomyzinae
- Genus: Calycomyza
- Species: C. verbenae

Binomial name
- Calycomyza verbenae (Hering, 1951)

Synonyms
- Dizygomyza verbenae Hering, 1951

Species of fly

Calycomyza verbenae is a species of fly in the family Agromyzidae.

== Distribution ==
United States.

== Hosts ==
Glandularia bipinnatifida, Verbena brasiliensis, Verbena neomexicana, Verbena urticifolia.
