= Calycomyza platyptera =

Scientific classification
- Kingdom: Animalia
- Phylum: Arthropoda
- Class: Insecta
- Order: Diptera
- Family: Agromyzidae
- Subfamily: Phytomyzinae
- Genus: Calycomyza
- Species: C. platyptera

Binomial name
- Calycomyza platyptera (Thomson, 1869)

Synonyms
- Agromyza platyptera Thomson, 1869

Species of fly

Calycomyza platyptera is a species of fly in the family Agromyzidae.

== Distribution ==
United States, West Indies.
