= Calycomyza colombiana =

Scientific classification
- Kingdom: Animalia
- Phylum: Arthropoda
- Class: Insecta
- Order: Diptera
- Family: Agromyzidae
- Subfamily: Phytomyzinae
- Genus: Calycomyza
- Species: C. colombiana

Binomial name
- Calycomyza colombiana Sasakawa, 1992

Species of fly

Calycomyza colombiana is a species of fly in the family Agromyzidae.

== Distribution ==
Colombia.
