= Calycomyza menthae =

Scientific classification
- Kingdom: Animalia
- Phylum: Arthropoda
- Class: Insecta
- Order: Diptera
- Family: Agromyzidae
- Subfamily: Phytomyzinae
- Genus: Calycomyza
- Species: C. menthae

Binomial name
- Calycomyza menthae Spencer, 1969

Species of fly

Calycomyza menthae is a species of fly in the family Agromyzidae.

== Distribution ==
Canada, United States.

== Hosts ==
Hedeoma hispida, Lycopus uniflorus, Mentha arvensis, Monarda didyma, Monarda fistulosa.
