= Locust bean gum =

Vegetable gum from the carob bean Ceratonia siliqua

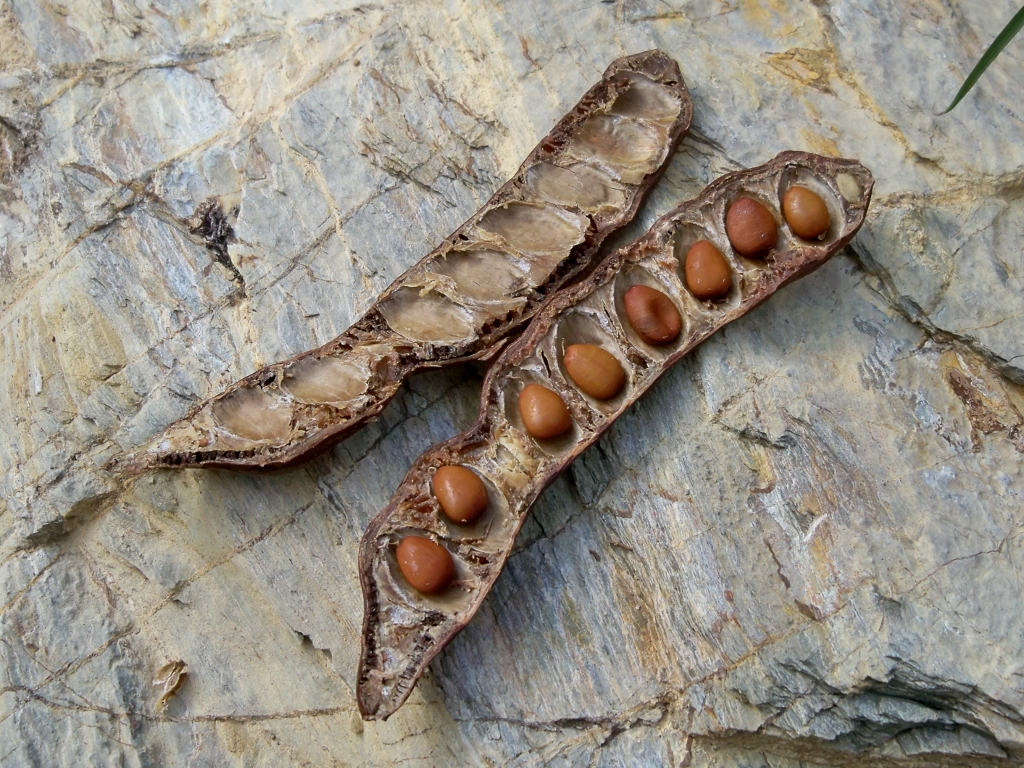
- Locust beans in a pod

Names
- Other names Carob gum; Carob bean gum; Carobin

Identifiers
CAS Number	9000-40-2
ECHA InfoCard	100.029.571
EC Number	232-541-5
E number	E410 (thickeners, ...)
UNII	V4716MY704
CompTox Dashboard (EPA)	DTXSID5020780
- Except where otherwise noted, data are given for materials in their standard state (at 25 °C [77 °F], 100 kPa). Infobox references

Locust bean gum (LBG, carob gum, carob bean gum, carobin, E410) is a galactomannan vegetable gum extracted from the seeds of the carob tree (Ceratonia siliqua) and used as a thickening agent (gelling agent) in food technology.

== Production ==
Locust bean gum is extracted from the seeds of the carob tree, which is native to the Mediterranean region. In 2016, nearly 75% of global production came from Portugal, Italy, Spain and Morocco. The seeds are contained within long pods that grow on the tree. First, the pods are kibbled to separate the seed from the pulp. Then, the seeds have their skins removed by an acid or heat treatment. Acid treatment yields a lighter coloured gum than heat treatment;^{:222} the deskinned seed is then split and gently milled. This causes the brittle germ to break up while not affecting the more robust endosperm. The two are separated by sieving. The separated endosperm can then be milled by a roller operation to produce the final locust bean gum powder. Alternatively, the gum can be extracted from the seeds with water, precipitated with alcohol, filtered, dried and milled, to give a very pure "clarified" locust bean gum.^{:223}

== Chemistry ==
Locust bean gum occurs as a white to yellow-white powder. It consists chiefly of high-molecular-weight hydrocolloidal polysaccharides, composed of galactose and mannose units combined through glycosidic linkages, which may be described chemically as galactomannan. It is dispersible in either hot or cold water, forming a sol having a pH between 5.4 and 7.0, which may be converted to a gel by the addition of small amounts of sodium borate. Locust bean gum is composed of a straight backbone chain of D-mannopyranose units with a side-branching unit of D-galactopyranose having an average of one D-galactopyranose unit branch on every fourth D-mannopyranose unit.

== Food science ==
The bean, when made into powder, is sweet—with a flavor similar to chocolate—and is used to sweeten foods and as a chocolate substitute. Carob powder is produced from the fruit pod after removal of seeds, while the gum is produced from the seeds themselves. It is also used in pet foods and inedible products such as mining products, paper making, and to thicken textiles. It is used in cosmetics and to enhance the flavor of cigarettes. Shoe polish and insecticides also have locust bean gum powder as an additive. It is soluble in hot water.

== See also ==
- Carageenan
- Guar gum
