= Guar gum =

Vegetable gum from the guar bean, Cyamopsis tetragonoloba

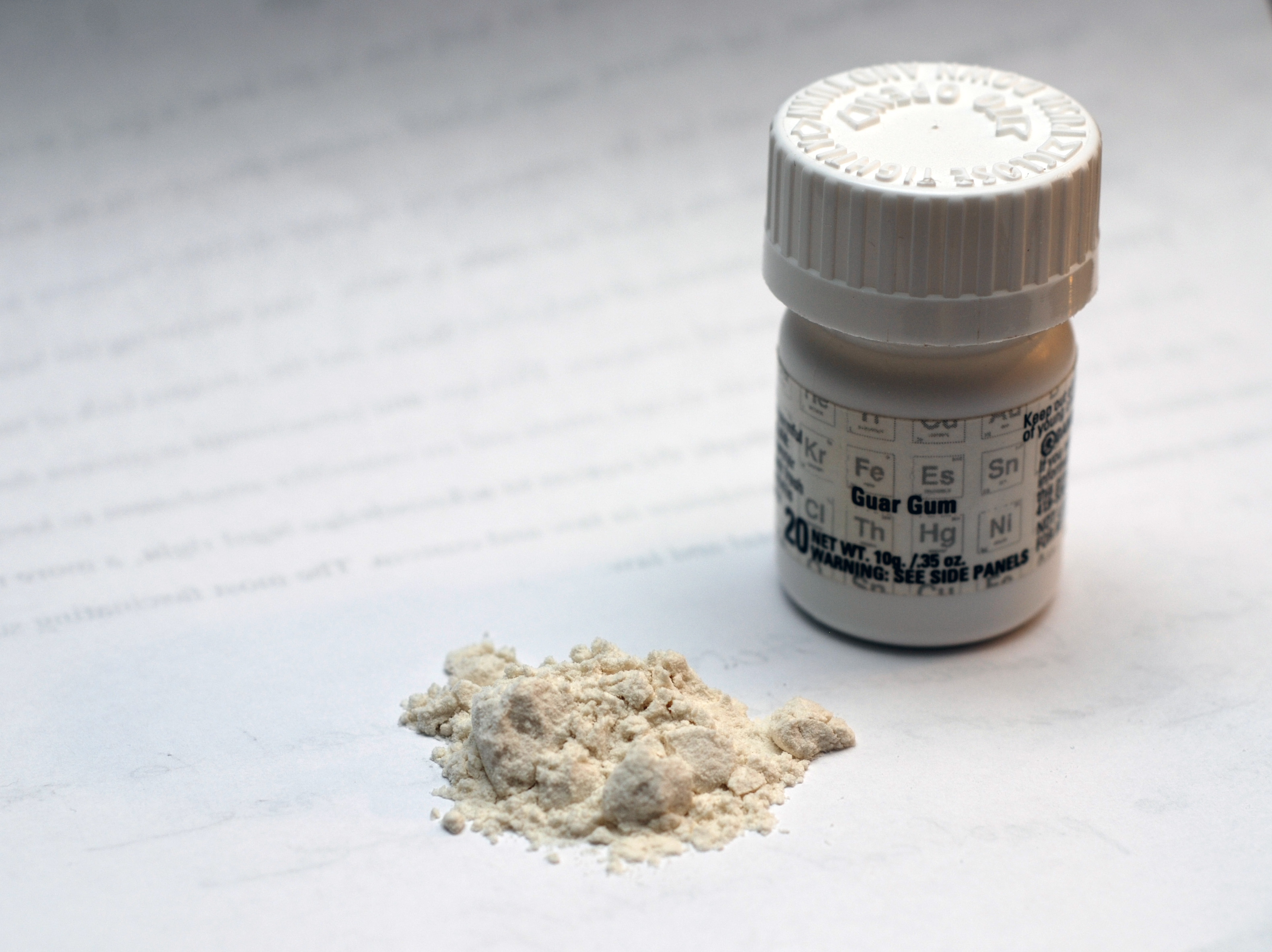

Identifiers
CAS Number	9000-30-0
ChemSpider	none
ECHA InfoCard	100.029.567
E number	E412 (thickeners, ...)
UNII	E89I1637KE
CompTox Dashboard (EPA)	DTXSID3020675

Properties
Density	0.8-1.0 g/mL at 25 °C
Acidity (pK_{a})	5-7

Pharmacology
ATC code	A10BX01 (WHO)

Hazards
Safety data sheet (SDS)	MSDS
- Except where otherwise noted, data are given for materials in their standard state (at 25 °C [77 °F], 100 kPa). verify (what is ?) Infobox references

Guar gum, also called guaran, is a galactomannan polysaccharide extracted from guar beans that has thickening and stabilizing properties useful in food, feed, and industrial applications. The guar seeds are mechanically dehusked, hydrated, milled and screened according to application. It is typically produced as a free-flowing, off-white powder.

== Production and trade ==
The guar bean is principally grown in India, Pakistan, the United States, Australia and Africa. India is the largest producer, accounting for nearly 80% of world production. In India, Rajasthan, Gujarat, and Haryana are the main producing regions. The US has produced 4,600 to 14,000 tonnes of guar over the last 5 years. Texas acreage since 1999 has fluctuated from about 7,000 to 50,000 acres. The world production for guar gum and its derivatives is about 1.0 million tonnes. Non-food guar gum accounts for about 40% of the total demand.

== Properties ==
=== Chemical composition ===
Guar gum is a galactomannan polysaccharide whose backbone structure consists of a linear chain of mannose with short lateral-branches of galactose.

Chemically, guar gum is an exo-polysaccharide composed of the sugars galactose and mannose. The backbone is a linear chain of β 1,4-linked mannose residues to which galactose residues are 1,6-linked at every second mannose, forming short side-branches. Guar gum has the ability to withstand temperatures of 80 °C (176 °F) for five minutes.

=== Solubility and viscosity ===
Guar gum is more soluble than locust bean gum due to its extra galactose branch points. Unlike locust bean gum, it is not self-gelling. Either borax or calcium can cross-link guar gum, causing it to gel. In water, it is nonionic and hydrocolloidal. It is not affected by ionic strength or pH, but will degrade at extreme pH and temperature (e.g., pH 3 at 50 °C). It remains stable in solution over pH range 5–7. Strong acids cause hydrolysis, and loss of viscosity and alkalis in strong concentration also tend to reduce viscosity. It is insoluble in most hydrocarbon solvents. The viscosity attained is dependent on time, temperature, concentration, pH, rate of agitation and particle size of the powdered gum used. The lower the temperature, the lower the rate at which viscosity increases, and the lower the final viscosity. Above 80 °C, the final viscosity is slightly reduced. Finer guar powders swell more rapidly than larger particle size coarse powdered gum.

Guar gum shows a clear low shear plateau on the flow curve and is strongly shear-thinning. The rheology of guar gum is typical for a random coil polymer. It does not show the very high low shear plateau viscosities seen with more rigid polymer chains such as xanthan gum. It is very thixotropic above 1% concentration, but below 0.3%, the thixotropy is slight. Guar gum shows viscosity synergy with xanthan gum. Guar gum and micellar casein mixtures can be slightly thixotropic if a biphase system forms.

=== Thickening ===
One use of guar gum is as a thickening agent in foods and medicines for humans and animals. Because it is gluten-free, it is used as an additive to replace wheat flour in baked goods.^{:41} It has been shown to reduce serum cholesterol and lower blood glucose levels.

Guar gum is also economical because it has almost eight times the water-thickening ability of other agents (e.g., cornstarch) and only a small quantity is needed for producing sufficient viscosity. Because less is required, costs are reduced.

In addition to guar gum's effects on viscosity, its high ability to flow, or deform, gives it favorable rheological properties. It forms gels that can be broken down after use when cross-linked with boron. It is used in various multi-phase formulations for hydraulic fracturing, in some as an emulsifier because it helps prevent oil droplets from coalescing, and in others as a stabilizer to help prevent solid particles from settling and/or separating.

Fracking entails the pumping of sand-laden fluids into an oil or natural gas reservoir at high pressure and flow rate. This cracks the reservoir rock and then props the cracks open. Water alone is too thin to be effective at carrying proppant sand, so guar gum is one of the ingredients added to thicken the slurry mixture and improve its ability to carry proppant. There are several properties which are important 1. Thixotropic: the fluid should be thixotropic, meaning it should gel within a few hours. 2. Gelling and de-gelling: The desired viscosity changes over the course of a few hours. When the fracking slurry is mixed, it needs to be thin enough to make it easier to pump. Then as it flows down the pipe, the fluid needs to gel to support the proppant and flush it deep into the fractures. After that process, the gel has to break down so that it is possible to recover the fracking fluid but leave the proppant behind. This requires a chemical process which produces then breaks the gel cross-linking at a predictable rate. Guar+boron+proprietary chemicals can accomplish both of these goals at once.

=== Ice crystal growth ===
Guar gum retards ice crystal growth by slowing mass transfer across the solid/liquid interface. It shows good stability during freeze-thaw cycles. Thus, it is used in egg-free ice cream. Guar gum has synergistic effects with locust bean gum and sodium alginate. May be synergistic with xanthan: together with xanthan gum, it produces a thicker product (0.5% guar gum / 0.35% xanthan gum), which is used in applications such as soups, which do not require clear results.

Guar gum is a hydrocolloid, hence is useful for making thick pastes without forming a gel, and for keeping water bound in a sauce or emulsion. Guar gum can be used for thickening cold and hot liquids, to make hot gels, light foams and as an emulsion stabilizer. Guar gum can be used for cottage cheeses, curds, yoghurt, sauces, soups and frozen desserts. Guar gum is also a good source of fiber, with 80% soluble dietary fiber on a dry weight basis.

=== Grading ===
Guar gum is analysed for

Test	Test Method	Test	Test method
Colour	TP/09	Acid-insoluble residue	TP/115
Viscosity	TP/10/04	Fat content	TP/18
Granulation (mesh)	TP/21	Ash content	TP/12
Moisture, pH	TP/1 and TP/29	Gum content	TP/03
Protein	TP/05	Heavy metals	TP/13
Insolubles Ash	TP/11	Filterability	TP/20A

Guar gum powder standards are:

- HS-Code- 130 232 30
- CAS No.- 9000-30-0
- EEC No.- E 412
- BT No.- 1302 3290
- EINECS No. - 232-536-8
- Imco Code- Harmless

== Manufacturing process ==
Depending upon the requirement of end product, various processing techniques are used. The commercial production of guar gum normally uses roasting, differential attrition, sieving, and polishing. Food-grade guar gum is manufactured in stages. Guar split selection is important in this process. The split is screened to clean it and then soaked to pre-hydrate it in a double-cone mixer. The prehydrating stage is very important because it determines the rate of hydration of the final product. The soaked splits, which have reasonably high moisture content, are passed through a flaker. The flaked guar split is ground and then dried. The powder is screened through rotary screens to deliver the required particle size. Oversize particles are either recycled to main ultra fine or reground in a separate regrind plant, according to the viscosity requirement.

This stage helps to reduce the load at the grinder. The soaked splits are difficult to grind. Direct grinding of those generates more heat in the grinder, which is not desired in the process, as it reduces the hydration of the product. Through the heating, grinding, and polishing process, the husk is separated from the endosperm halves and the refined guar split is obtained. Through the further grinding process, the refined guar split is then treated and converted into powder. The split manufacturing process yields husk and germ called "guar meal", widely sold in the international market as cattle feed. It is high in protein and contains oil and albuminoids, about 50% in germ and about 25% in husks. The quality of the food-grade guar gum powder is defined from its particle size, rate of hydration, and microbial content.

Manufacturers define different grades and qualities of guar gum by the particle size, the viscosity generated with a given concentration, and the rate at which that viscosity develops. Coarse-mesh guar gums will typically, but not always, develop viscosity more slowly. They may achieve a reasonably high viscosity, but will take longer to achieve. On the other hand, they will disperse better than fine-mesh, all conditions being equal. A finer mesh, such as a 200 mesh, requires more effort to dissolve. Modified forms of guar gum are available commercially, including enzyme-modified, cationic and hydropropyl guar.

== Industrial applications ==
- Textile industry – sizing, finishing and printing
- Paper industry – improved sheet formation, folding and denser surface for printing
- Explosives industry – as waterproofing agent mixed with ammonium nitrate, nitroglycerin, etc.
- Pharmaceutical industry – as binder or as disintegrator in tablets; main ingredient in some bulk-forming laxatives
- Cosmetics and toiletries industries – thickener in toothpastes, conditioner in shampoos (usually in a chemically modified version)
- Hydraulic fracturing – Shale oil and gas extraction industries consumes about 90% of guar gum produced from India and Pakistan.

Fracturing fluids normally consist of many additives that serve two main purposes, firstly to enhance fracture creation and proppant carrying capability and secondly to minimize formation damage. Viscosifiers, such as polymers and crosslinking agents, temperature stabilizers, pH control agents, and fluid loss control materials are among the additives that assist fracture creation. Formation damage is minimized by incorporating breakers, biocides, and surfactants. More appropriate gelling agents are linear polysaccharides, such as guar gum, cellulose, and their derivatives.

Guar gums are preferred as thickeners for enhanced oil recovery (EOR). Guar gum and its derivatives account for most of the gelled fracturing fluids. Guar is more water-soluble than other gums, and it is also a better emulsifier, because it has more galactose branch points. Guar gum shows high low-shear viscosity, but it is strongly shear-thinning. Being non-ionic, it is not affected by ionic strength or pH but will degrade at low pH at moderate temperature (pH 3 at 50 °C). Guar's derivatives demonstrate stability in high temperature and pH environments. Guar use allows for achieving exceptionally high viscosities, which improves the ability of the fracturing liquid to transport proppant. Guar hydrates fairly rapidly in cold water to give highly viscous pseudoplastic solutions of, generally, greater low-shear viscosity than other hydrocolloids. The colloidal solids present in guar make fluids more efficient by creating less filter cake. Proppant pack conductivity is maintained by utilizing a fluid that has excellent fluid loss control, such as the colloidal solids present in guar gum.

Guar has up to eight times the thickening power of starch. Derivatization of guar gum leads to subtle changes in properties, such as decreased hydrogen bonding, increased solubility in water-alcohol mixture, and improved electrolyte compatibility. These changes in properties result in increased use in different fields, like textile printing, explosives, and oil-water fracturing applications.

=== Crosslinking guar ===
Guar molecules have a tendency to aggregate during the hydraulic fracturing process, mainly due to intermolecular hydrogen bonding. These aggregates are detrimental to oil recovery because they clog the fractures, restricting the flow of oil. Cross-linking guar polymer chains prevents aggregation by forming metal–hydroxyl complexes. The first crosslinked guar gels were developed in the late 1960s. Several metal additives have been used for crosslinking; among them are chromium, aluminium, antimony, zirconium, and the more commonly used boron. Boron, in the form of B(OH)4, reacts with the hydroxyl groups on the polymer in a two-step process to link two polymer strands together to form bis-diol complexes.

1:1 1,2 diol complex and a 1:1 1,3 diol complex, place the negatively charged borate ion onto the polymer chain as a pendant group. Boric acid itself does not apparently complex to the polymer so that all bound boron is negatively charged. The primary form of crosslinking may be due to ionic association between the anionic borate complex and adsorbed cations on the second polymer chain . The development of cross-linked gels was a major advance in fracturing fluid technology. Viscosity is enhanced by tying together the low molecular weight strands, effectively yielding higher molecular weight strands and a rigid structure. Cross-linking agents are added to linear polysaccharide slurries to provide higher proppant transport performance, relative to linear gels.

Lower concentrations of guar gelling agents are needed when linear guar chains are cross-linked. It has been determined that reduced guar concentrations provide better and more complete breaks in a fracture. The breakdown of cross-linked guar gel after the fracturing process restores formation permeability and allows increased production flow of petroleum products.

- Mining
- Hydroseeding – formation of seed-bearing "guar tack"
- Medical institutions, especially nursing homes - used to thicken liquids and foods for patients with dysphagia
- Fire retardant industry – as a thickener in Phos-Chek
- Nanoparticles industry – to produce silver or gold nanoparticles, or develop innovative medicine delivery mechanisms for drugs in pharmaceutical industry
- Slime (toy), based on guar gum crosslinked with sodium tetraborate

== Food applications ==
The largest market for guar gum is in the food industry. In the US, differing percentages are set for its allowable concentration in various food applications. In Europe, guar gum has EU food additive code E412. Xanthan gum and guar gum are the most frequently used gums in gluten-free recipes and gluten-free products.

Applications include:

- In baked goods, it increases dough yield, gives greater resiliency, and improves texture and shelf life; in pastry fillings, it prevents "weeping" (syneresis) of the water in the filling, keeping the pastry crust crisp. It is primarily used in hypoallergenic recipes that use different types of whole-grain flours. Because the consistency of these flours allows the escape of gas released by leavening, guar gum is needed to improve the thickness of these flours, allowing them to rise as a normal flour would.
- In dairy products, it thickens milk, yogurt, kefir, and liquid cheese products, and helps maintain homogeneity and texture of ice creams and sherbets. It is used for similar purposes in plant milks.
- For meat, it functions as a binder.
- In condiments, it improves the stability and appearance of salad dressings, barbecue sauces, relishes, ketchups and others.
- In canned soup, it is used as a thickener and stabilizer.
- It is also used in dry soups, instant oatmeal, sweet desserts, canned fish in sauce, frozen food items, and animal feed.
- The FDA has banned guar gum as a weight loss pill due to reports of the substance swelling and obstructing the intestines and esophagus.
- Cattle feed, as it increases milk production and the milk's fat content.

== Nutritional and medicinal effects ==
Guar gum, as a water-soluble fiber, acts as a bulk-forming laxative. Several studies have found it decreases cholesterol levels. These decreases are thought to be a function of its high soluble fiber content.

Moreover, its low digestibility lends its use in recipes as a filler, which can help to provide satiety or slow the digestion of a meal, thus lowering the glycemic index of that meal. In the late 1980s, guar gum was used and heavily promoted in several weight-loss drugs. The US Food and Drug Administration eventually recalled these due to reports of esophageal blockage from insufficient fluid intake, after one brand alone caused at least 10 users to be hospitalized, and a death. For this reason, guar gum is no longer approved for use in over-the-counter weight loss drugs in the United States, although this restriction does not apply to supplements. Moreover, a meta-analysis found guar gum supplements were not effective in reducing body weight.

Guar-based compounds, such as hydroxypropyl guar, have been used in artificial tears to treat dry eye.

=== Allergies ===
Some studies have found an allergic sensitivity to guar gum developed in a few individuals working in an industrial environment where airborne concentrations of the substance were present. In those affected by the inhalation of the airborne particles, common adverse reactions were occupational rhinitis and asthma.

=== Dioxin contamination ===
In July 2007, the European Commission issued a health warning to its member states after high levels of dioxins were detected in guar gum, which was used as a thickener in small quantities in meat, dairy, dessert and delicatessen products. The source was traced to guar gum from India that was contaminated with pentachlorophenol (PCP), a pesticide no longer in use. PCP contains dioxins, which damage the human immune system.
