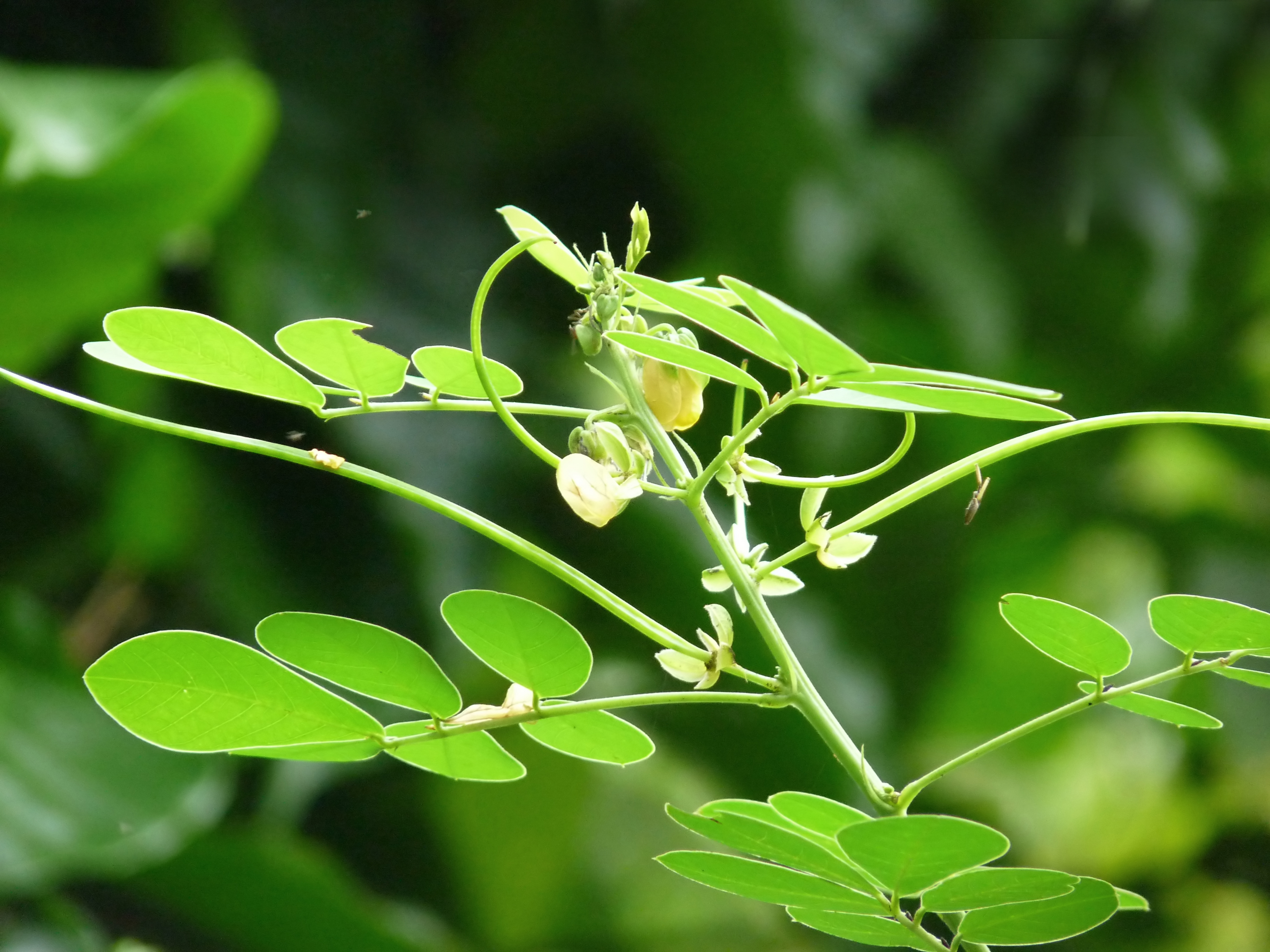

Conservation status
- Least Concern (IUCN 3.1)

- Secure (NatureServe)

Scientific classification
- Kingdom: Plantae
- Clade: Tracheophytes
- Clade: Angiosperms
- Clade: Eudicots
- Clade: Rosids
- Order: Fabales
- Family: Fabaceae
- Subfamily: Caesalpinioideae
- Genus: Senna
- Species: S. obtusifolia

Binomial name
- Senna obtusifolia (L.) H.S.Irwin & Barneby

Synonyms
- Cassia obtusifolia L.; Cassia tora var. obtusifolia (L.) Haines; Emelista obtusifolia (L.) Raf.; Senna tora var. obtusifolia (L.) X.Y.Zhu; Cassia rogeonii Ghesq.; Cassia tora var. humilis Pers.; Cassia toroides Raf.; Senna toroides Roxb.

= Senna obtusifolia =

Species of legume

Senna obtusifolia, known by common names including Chinese senna, American sicklepod and sicklepod, is a plant in the genus Senna, sometimes separated in the monotypic genus Diallobus. It grows wild in North, Central, and South America, Asia, Africa, and Oceania, and is considered a particularly problematic weed in many places. It has a long-standing history of confusion with Senna tora and that taxon in many sources actually refers to the present species.

In the traditional medicine of Eastern Asia, the seeds are called jué míng zǐ in Chinese (simplified: 决明子; traditional: 決明子), gyeolmyeongja in Korean, and ketsumeishi in Japanese.

The green leaves of the plant are fermented to produce a high-protein food product called kawal which is eaten by many people in Sudan as a meat substitute. Its leaves, seeds, and root are also used in folk medicine, primarily in Asia. It is believed to possess a laxative effect, as well as to be beneficial for the eyes. As a folk remedy, the seeds are often roasted, then boiled in water to produce sicklepod tea. The plant's seeds are a commercial source of cassia gum, a food additive usually used as a thickener and named for the Chinese Senna's former placement in the genus Cassia. Roasted and ground, the seeds have also been used as a substitute for coffee. In vitro cultures of S. obtusifolia such as hairy roots may be a source of valuable secondary metabolites with medical applications.

== Taxonomy and naming ==
This species was first formally described in 1753 by Carl Linnaeus who gave it the name Cassia obtusifolia in Species Plantarum. In 1979, Howard Samuel Irwin and Rupert Charles Barneby transferred the species to the genus Senna as S. obtusifolia in the Memoirs of the New York Botanical Garden. The specific epithet (obtusifolia) means "blunt-leaved".

S. obtusifolia is known by a number of common names. Apart from "sicklepod", sickle-pod senna, rarely "Chinese senna" or even "American sicklepod", it is also called arsenic weed, foetid cassia, or wild senna.

It is also known locally by common names such as "coffee weed" (coffeeweed) or "java bean" (in Australia) or "coffee pod" (in the American South or West), although the terms "coffee weed" or "coffee pod" are ambiguous as they also apply to S. tora. It may be called by the Hindi name "chakunda" in India, but this is also one of the names for S. tora.

Names in its native range are also:

- Chinese: pinyin: jué míng (simplified Chinese: 决明; traditional Chinese: 決明), though this could apply to S. tora or loosely to the Senna genus generally.
- Japanese: ebisu-gusa ("Ebisu grass": エビスグサ; 胡草; 恵比須草)
- Korean: gyeolmyeongja (Korean: 결명자; Hanja: 決明子)
- Vietnamese: thảo quyết minh (from chữ Hán: 草決明)
- Portuguese: fedegoso (also used for Senna macranthera and others)
- Hindi: chirauta chokad
- Sanskrit: चक्रमर्द (cakramarda), प्रापुनाट (prāpunāṭa), or प्रपुन्नाड (prapunnāḍa).

== Distribution and habitat ==
Senna obtusifolia naturally occurs in tropical and subtropical regions of the Americas, but has been introduced to Africa, parts of Europe, the Middle East, the Indian subcontinent, parts of Southeast Asia, New Guinea and parts of Australia. Its nativity in the North America disputed, but it is usually considered to be native to the Southeastern United States, while others also consider it to be native to the eastern and central U.S. north to New York. However, the earliest records in North America date to the early to mid 1800s. In its natural environment, it grows on the shores of lakes and rivers, but is also a weed of pastures and roadsides at altitudes up to 1,100 m (3,600 ft).

== Ecology ==
Senna obtusifolia is non-nodulating and does not have a symbiotic association with soil bacteria, unlike other members of the family Fabaceae. Senna obtusifolia is usually self pollinated as many flowers being fertilized before opening, though the flowers are heavily visited by bees. Senna obtusifolia has one (in Caribbean and North American forms) to two (in South American forms) extrafloral nectaries on the upper surface of the rachis that usually attract ants, but occasionally attracts wasps, flies and small bees. It serves as a host plant for several Lepidoptera and other insects including Eurema lisa, Eurema nicippe, Phoebis sennae cubule and Calycomyza malvae. Northern bobwhite and greater prairie chickens are known to feed on the seeds. Mammalian herbivory is rare due to the foliage's foul taste and toxicity, which is known to poison livestock.

== Traditional Eastern medicine ==
The materia medica name for the seeds in Chinese is jué míng zǐ (simplified: 决明子; traditional: 決明子). The medicinal seeds are also known by the equivalent Korean name gyeolmyeongja (결명자; 決明子) in traditional Korean medicine, and by the Japanese name ketsumei-shi (ケツメイシ, 決明子) in kampō medicine.

The jue ming zi is used widely in Asia, including Southeast Asian countries such as Thailand, and its herbal sicklepod tea is drunk instead of regular tea as a preventative for hypertension. It is also purported to have the ability to clear the eye. In Korea also, medicinal gyeolmyeongja is usually prepared as tea (gyeolmyeongja-cha, "sickle pod tea").

Senna tora (Cassia tora) is used similarly, and though distinguished in the Chinese market as the "little/lesser" variety or shao jue ming 小決明) the Japanese government's [pharmacopoeia] (Nihon yakkyokuhō) officially acknowledges both S. obtusifolia and S. tora to be commerced as ketsumeishi.

The Japanese beverage habu-cha (ハブ茶), as the name suggests, was originally brewed from the seeds of the habusō or S. occidentalis, but currently marketed habu-cha uses S. obtusifolia as substitute, since it is a higher-yielding crop.

== Western medicine ==
The antimicrobial activity of leaf extracts of Senna obtusifolia have been studied.

== Meat substitute ==
Kawal, a protein-rich meat substitute eaten in Sudan, is produced by crushing the leaves of the plant into a paste which is then traditionally fermented in an earthenware jar, buried in a cool place. The jar is dug up every three days and the contents mixed. After two weeks, the paste is removed and rolled into balls which are left to dry in the sun. They are usually cooked in stews with onions and okra.

== Toxicity in cattle, sheep and goats ==
Ingested in larger quantities, Senna obtusifolia is toxic to cattle, sheep and goats. It is not readily palatable due to its bitter taste but may be consumed by livestock when other pasture forage is lacking. The main clinical signs are diarrhea, reluctance to move, muscular weakness and recumbency. Brown urine may be observed due to the presence of myoglobin from muscle breakdown. Macroscopic necropsy findings consist of pale discoloration of skeletal muscles. Microscopically, affected cattle show degeneration and necrosis of the skeletal and occasionally cardiac muscles. Some animals may develop centrilobular hepatic necrosis. Seasonal variation in toxicity of the plant has been reported.

== See also ==
- Sicklepod tea
- Chamaecrista nomame - Chamaecrista sp. (Japanese: kawaraketsumei lit. 'riverside sicklepod')

== Bibliography ==
- International Legume Database & Information Service (ILDIS) (2005): Genera Cassia and Senna. Version 10.01, November 2005. Retrieved 2007-12-17.
- "Senna obtusifolia". Germplasm Resources Information Network. Agricultural Research Service, United States Department of Agriculture.
