= Calycomyza malvae =

Scientific classification
- Kingdom: Animalia
- Phylum: Arthropoda
- Class: Insecta
- Order: Diptera
- Family: Agromyzidae
- Subfamily: Phytomyzinae
- Genus: Calycomyza
- Species: C. malvae

Binomial name
- Calycomyza malvae (Burgess, 1880)

Synonyms
- Calycomyza althaeae Spencer, 1969; Oscinis malvae Burgess, 1880

Species of fly

Calycomyza malvae is a species of fly in the family Agromyzidae.

== Distribution ==
United States, West Indies, Brazil.

== Host ==
Malva sylvestris.
