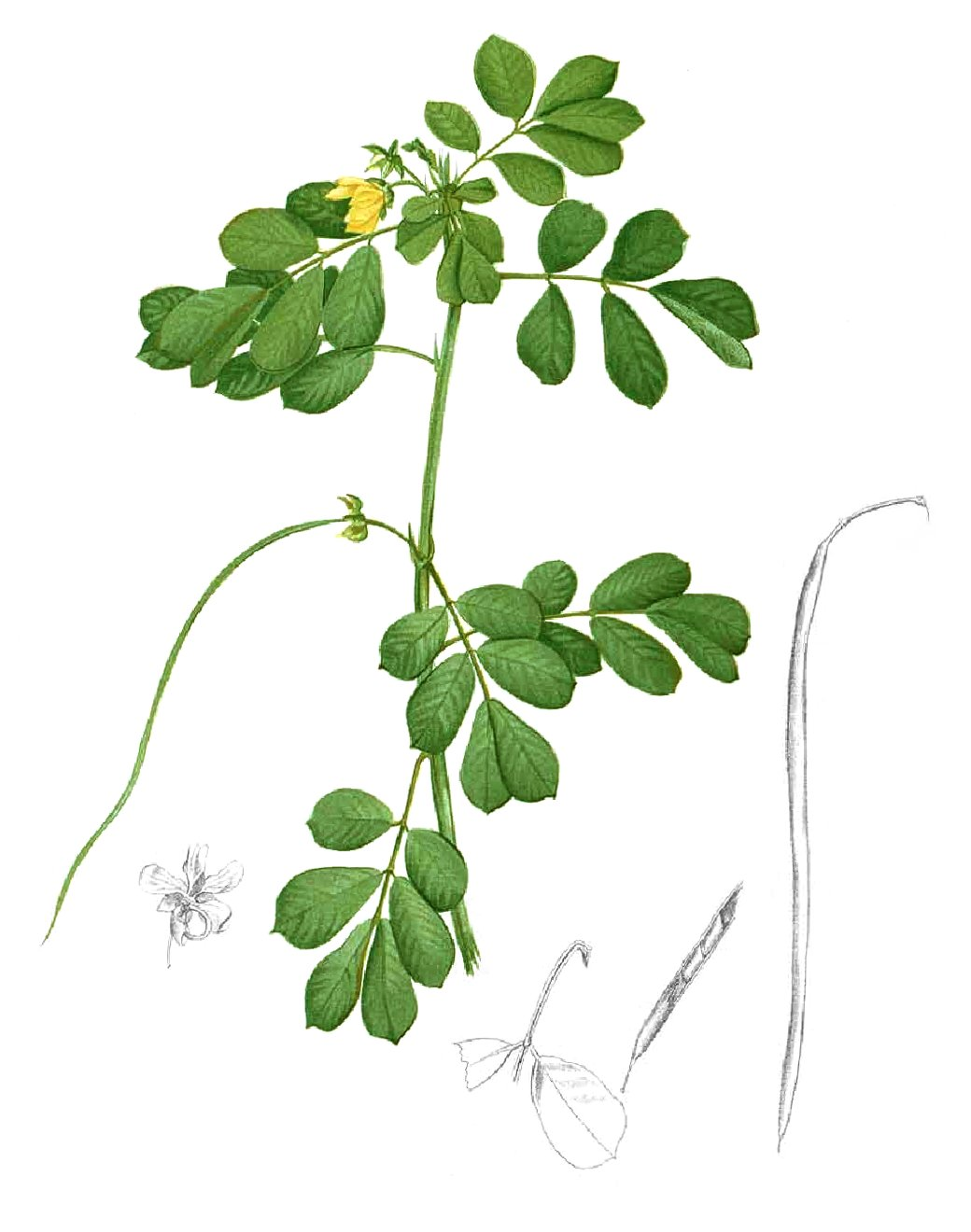

Scientific classification
- Kingdom: Plantae
- Clade: Tracheophytes
- Clade: Angiosperms
- Clade: Eudicots
- Clade: Rosids
- Order: Fabales
- Family: Fabaceae
- Subfamily: Caesalpinioideae
- Genus: Senna
- Species: S. tora

Binomial name
- Senna tora (L.) Roxb.

Synonyms
- Numerous, see text

= Senna tora =

Species of flowering plant

This page is about the Cassia tora described by Linnaeus. Later authors usually applied the taxon to Senna obtusifolia.

Senna tora (originally described by Linnaeus as Cassia tora) is a plant species in the family Fabaceae and the subfamily Caesalpinioideae. Its name is derived from its Sinhala name tora (තෝර). It grows wild in most of the tropics and is considered a weed in many places. Its native range is in Central America. Its most common English name is sickle senna or sickle wild sensitive-plant. Other common names include sickle pod, tora, coffee pod and foetid cassia. It is often confused with Chinese senna or sickle pod, Senna obtusifolia.

== Synonyms ==
The taxonomic history of this plant is extremely confused, even by the standards of Senna and Cassia. S. tora and S. obtusifolia were for long and are often still held to be—and may eventually be verified as—a single species. Hence, taxa referring to either species were indiscriminately applied to both.

- Cassia boreensis Miq.
- Cassia borneensis Miq.
- Cassia gallinaria Collad.
- Cassia numilis Collad.

Apparently a misprint for Cassia humilis, which would have been applied to this species in error as it is properly a synonym of Senna obtusifolia and Chamaecrista kunthiana, depending on the author.

- Cassia tora L.

As discussed above, the Cassia tora of other authors refers to Senna obtusifolia

- Cassia tora L. var. borneensis (Miq.) Miq.

Cassia tora L. var. b, var. humilis, and var. obtusifolia all refer to Senna obtusifolia

- Emelista tora Britton & Rose

== Habitat ==
It is considered invasive in New-Caledonia.

== Gallery ==
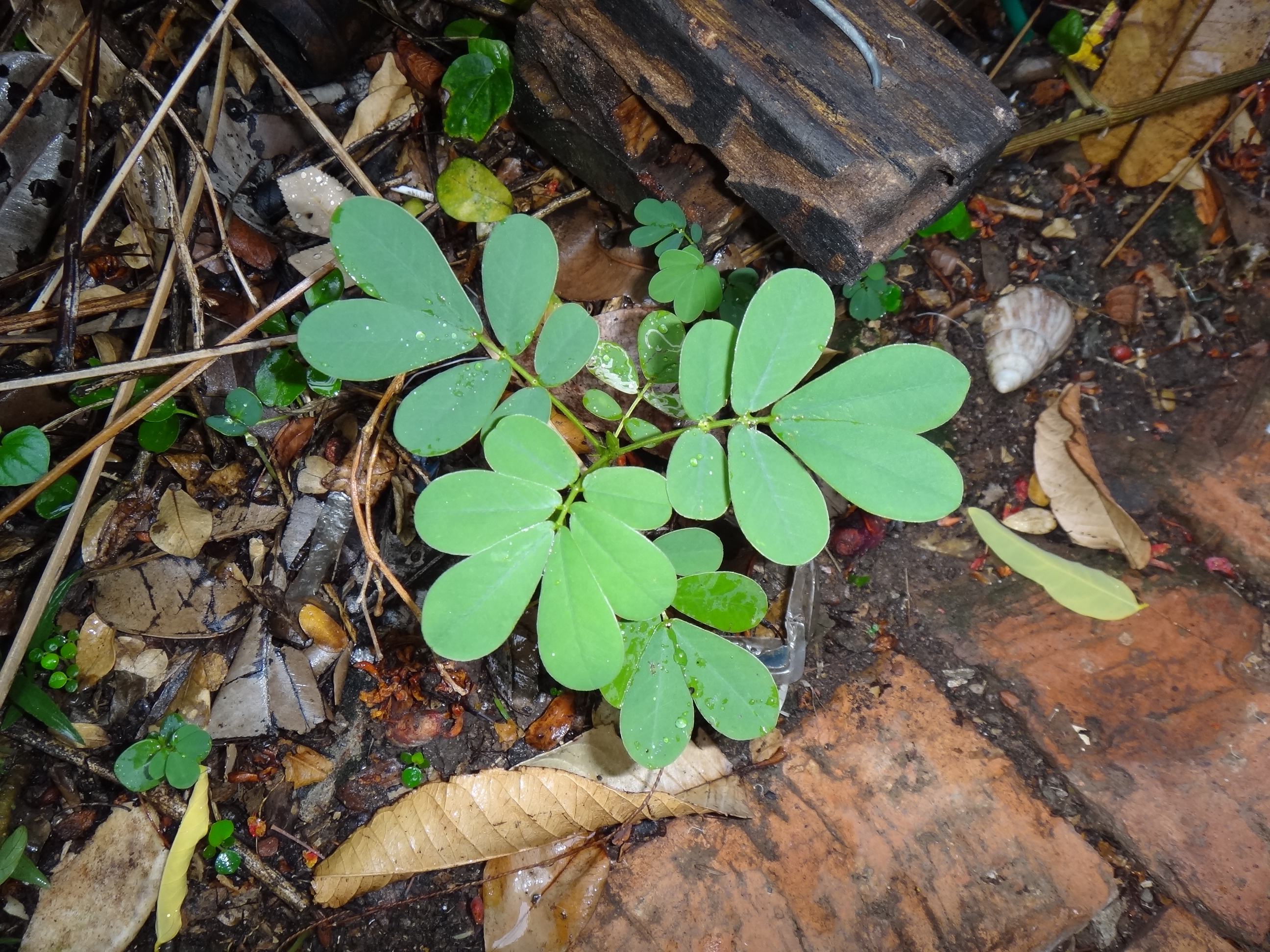
Growing plant, about two weeks old

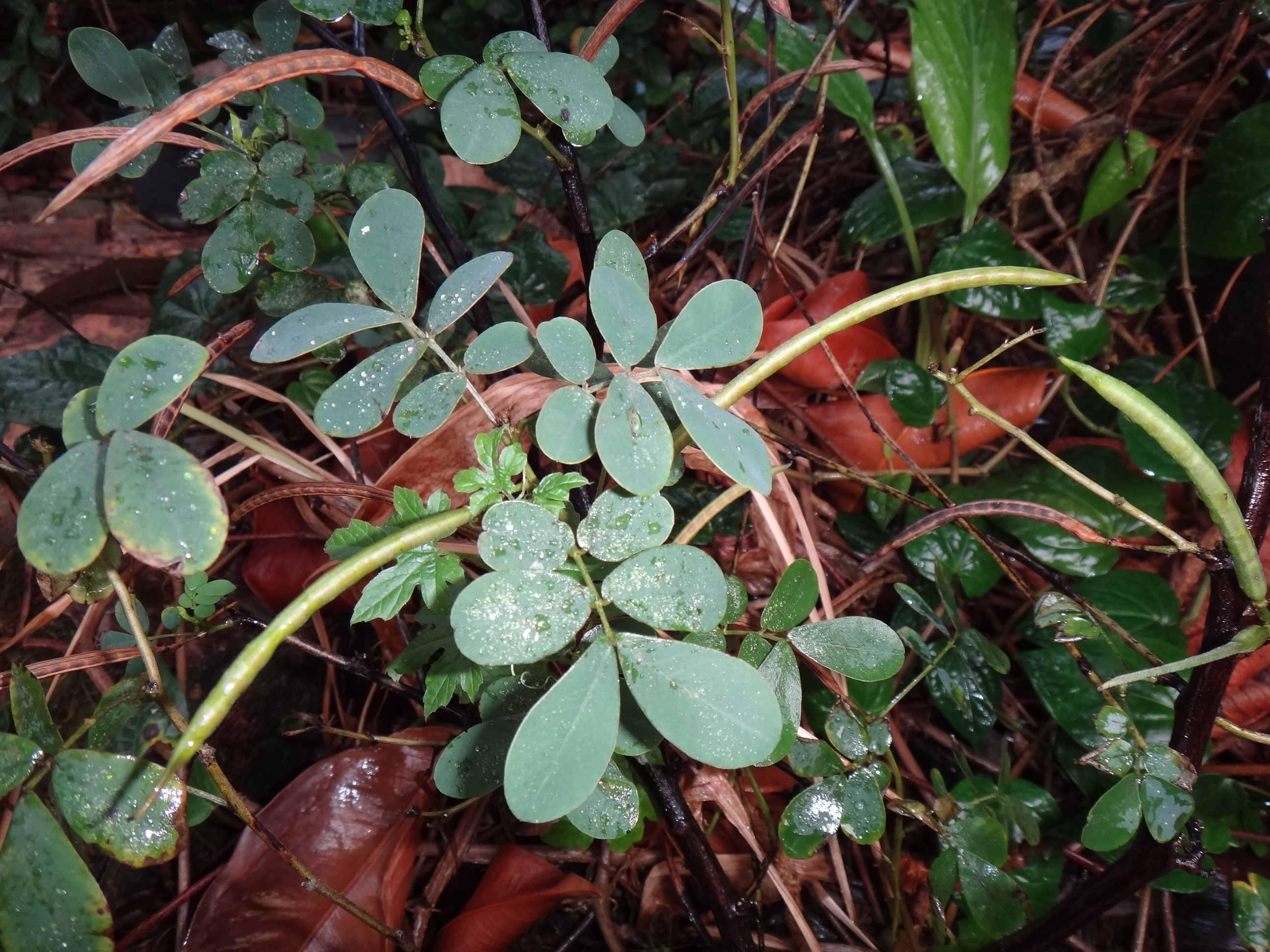
Old branch with seeds

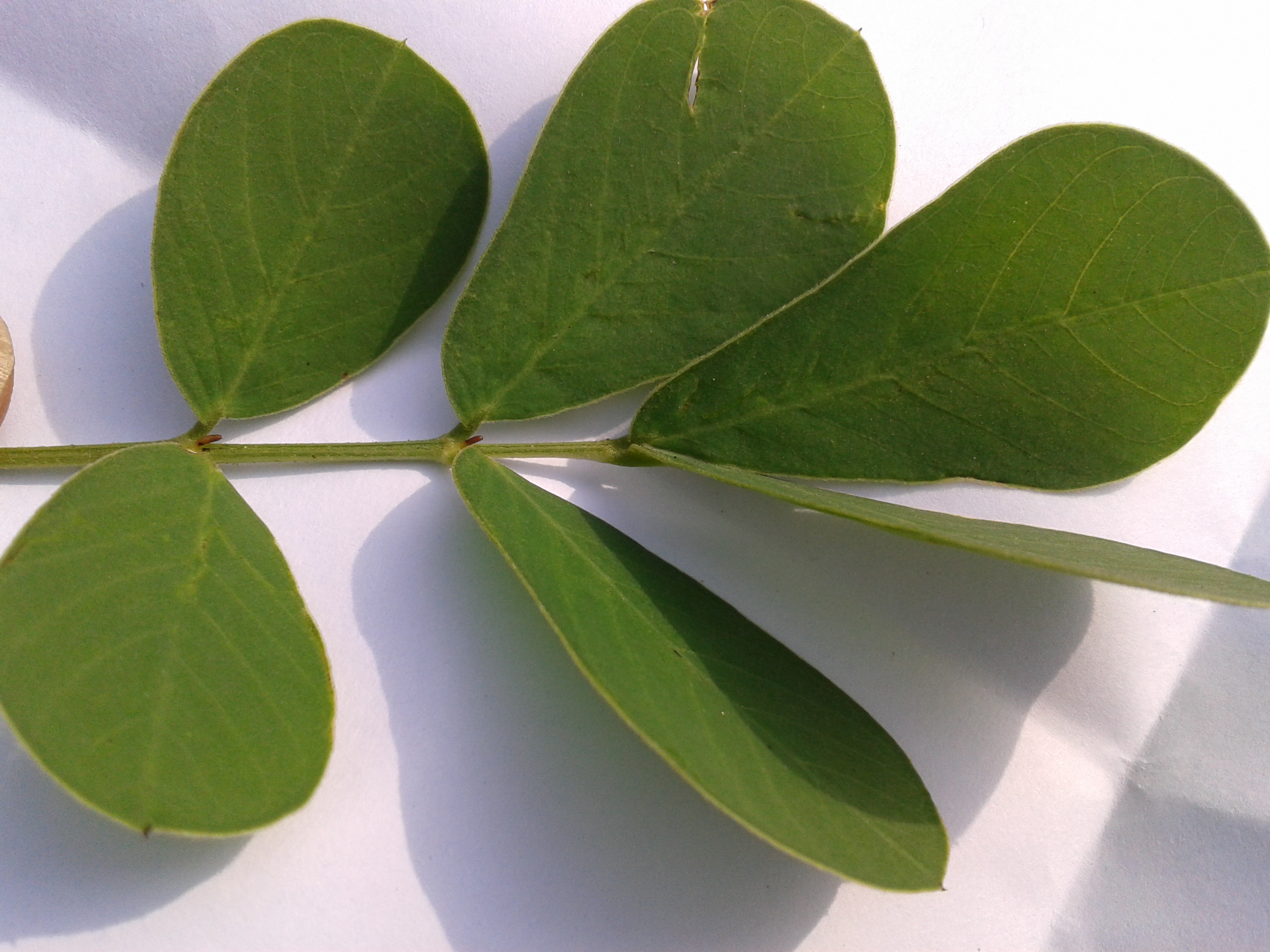
Cassia tora

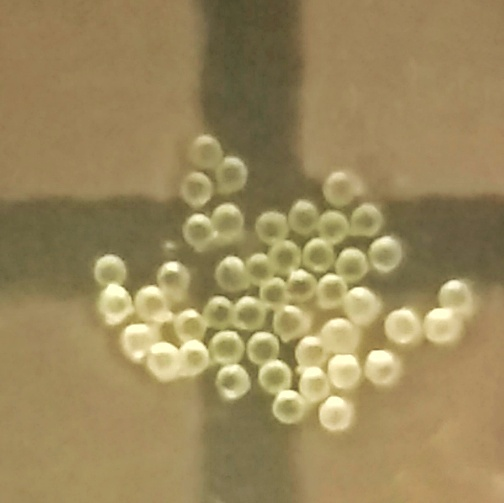
Pollen of Senna tora

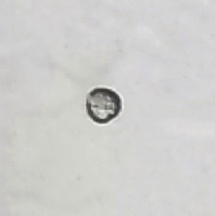
Pollen of Senna tora

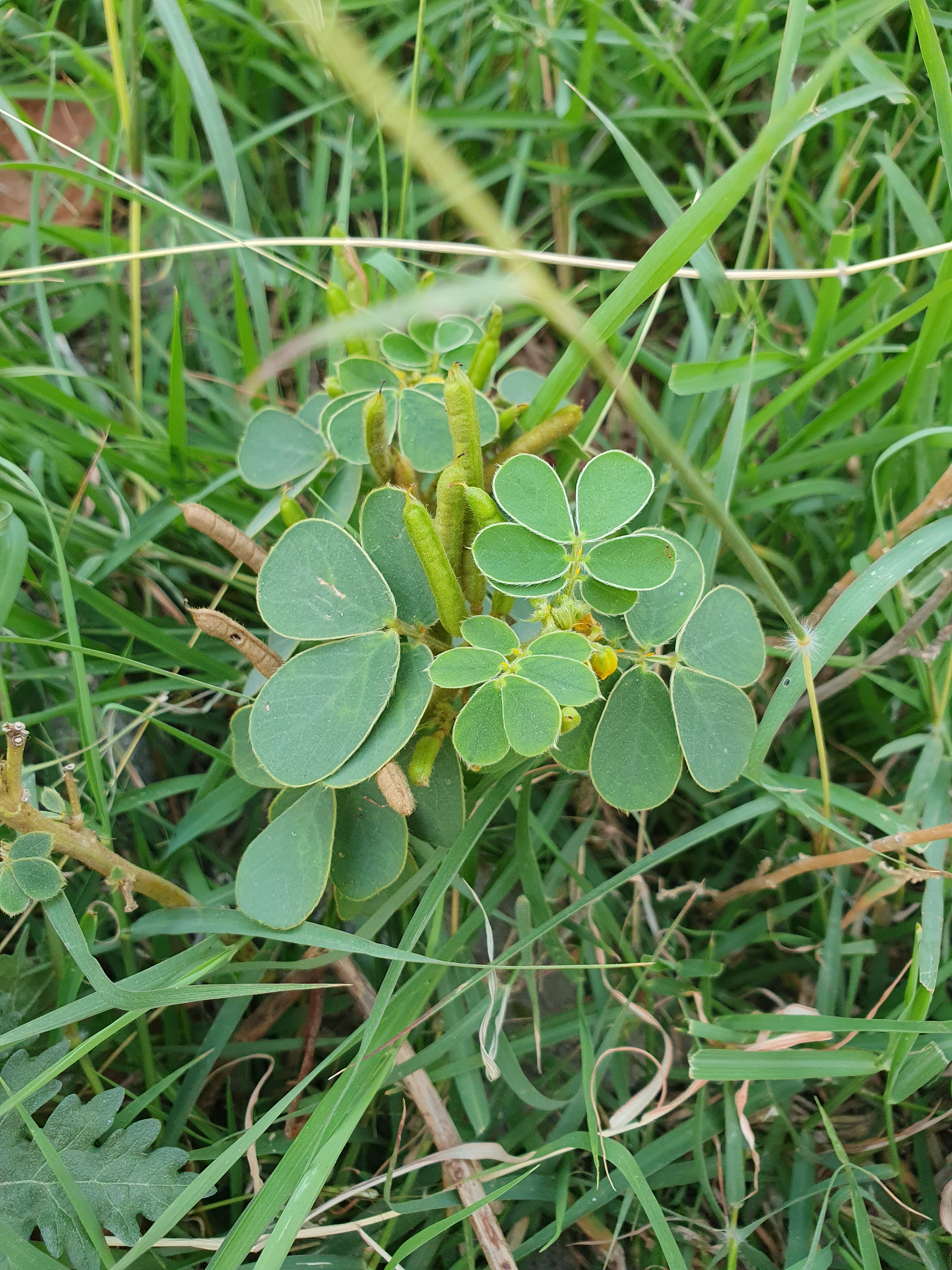
Young Senna tora plant
