= 2007–08 ULEB Cup Final =

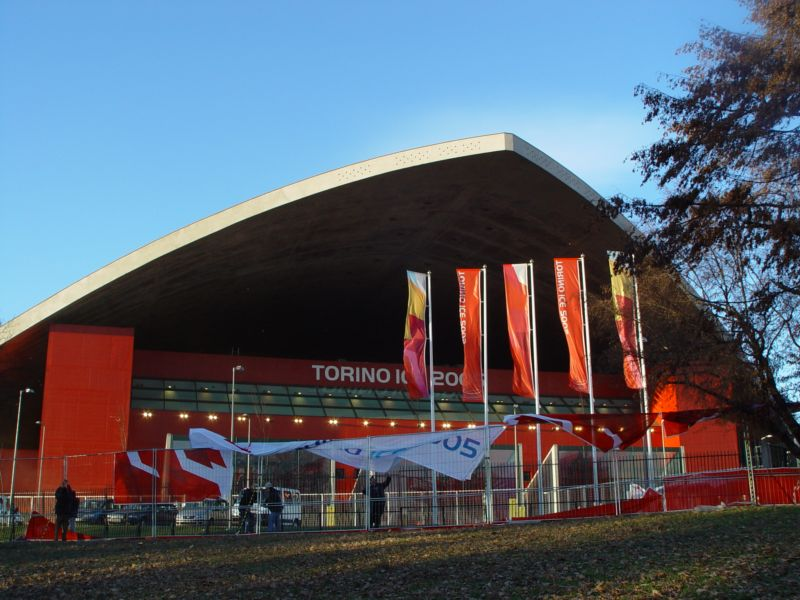
Torino Palavela

2007–08 ULEB Cup final was the championship game of 2007–08 ULEB Cup played at the Torino Palavela in Turin, Italy. The final was won by DKV Joventut who beat Akasvayu Girona 79–54. It was the first time in ULEB Cup that two clubs from the same country competed in the final.

== Final ==
April 13
18:30

(Report)

Akasvayu Girona (Spain)	54–**79**	**(Spain) DKV Joventut**
Scoring by quarter: **21**-16, 6-**18**, 10-**24**, 17-**21**
Pts: Ivan Radenović 20; Rebs: Marc Gasol 10; Asts: Víctor Sada 5		Pts: Desmond Mallet 26; Rebs: Luboš Bartoň 8 Asts: Pau Ribas 3

Palavela, Turin
Attendance: 5,060
Referees: Facchini (ITA), Belosevic (SRB), Viator (FRA)

=== Game Stats ===
Game Stats, Final
(Spain) Akasvayu Girona

#	Player	Min played	Points				Rebounds			Other Statistics			Blocks		Fouls	
#	Player	Min played	FT	2FG	3FG	TOT	Off	Def	TOT	Assists	Steals	Turnovers	Fv	Ag	Cm	Rv
5	**(Serbia) Branko Cvetković**	20:49	-	0/1	1/5	**3**	-	2	**2**	-	-	3		1	2	1
8	**(Spain) Víctor Sada**	34:48	-	0/1	1/6	**3**	-	3	**3**	5	-	3	-	1	1	2
10	**(United States) Ariel McDonald**	34:09	2/2	3/4	1/7	**11**	-	1	**1**	3	-	3	-	1	-	2
11	(Lithuania) Tomas Nagys	DNP														
15	(United States) Erik Daniels	16:35	-	0/2	2/4	**6**	1	3	**4**	-	-	2	-	-	3	-
18	(Spain) Román Montañez	03:34	-	-	-	-	-	1	**1**	-	-	-	-	-	1	-
19	(Spain) Fernando San Emeterio	21:28	-	1/2	0/3	**2**	1	1	**2**	-	1	2	-	-	3	1
32	(United States) Maurice Whitfield	05:12	-	-	-	-	-	-	-	-	-	-	-	-	3	1
33	**(Spain) Marc Gasol**	34:44	5/6	2/5	0/1	**9**	5	5	**10**	3	2	4	1	2	2	4
44	(United States) Darryl Middleton	DNP														
55	**(Serbia) Ivan Radenović**	28:41	4/5	5/8	2/3	**20**	1	1	**2**	-	2	1	-	1	2	6
	**TEAM**	200:00	11/13	11/23	7/29	**54**	10	17	**17**	11	5	18	1	6	17	17

Notes: # - Player number; Min played - Minutes played; Points - FT: Free Throws, 2FG: 2-point Field Goals, 3FG: 3-point Field Goals, TOT: Total points; Rebounds - Off: Offensive, Def: Defensive, TOT: Total rebounds; Blocks - Fv: In Favor, Ag: Against; Fouls - Cm: Committed, Rv: Received; Players in bold were in starters

Game Stats, Final
(Spain) DKV Joventut

#	Player	Min played	Points				Rebounds			Other Statistics			Blocks		Fouls	
#	Player	Min played	FT	2FG	3FG	TOT	Off	Def	TOT	Assists	Steals	Turnovers	Fv	Ag	Cm	Rv
00	**(United States) Desmond Mallet**	20:59	2/2	3/3	6/8	**26**	-	1	**1**	-	-	-	-	-	-	1
4	(Spain) Pau Ribas	21:00	-	1/2	0/2	**2**	-	-	-	3	-	3	-	-	3	-
5	(Spain) Rudy Fernández	26:37	4/4	3/5	1/4	**13**	3	4	**7**	2	3	2	1	-	2	5
9	**(Spain) Ricky Rubio**	20:16	-	1/3	0/3	**2**	-	-	-	-	3	1	-	1	2	2
11	(Czech Republic) Luboš Bartoň	25:01	-	1/1	2/4	**8**	6	2	**8**	1	4	-	1	-	3	2
12	(Spain) Josep Franch	01:14	-	-	0/1	-	-	-	-	-	-	-	-	-	-	-
14	**(Germany) Jan-Hendrik Jagla**	16:52	0/1	4/4	0/5	**8**	1	2	**3**	1	-	1	-	-	2	1
15	(Serbia) Petar Popović	09:53	-	3/5	-	**6**	-	1	**1**	1	-	-	-	-	1	-
16	**(Spain) Eduardo Hernández**	04:24	-	-	-	-	1	-	**1**	-	-	-	-	-	-	-
18	**(Spain) Ferran Laviña**	25:50	2/2	1/1	0/4	**4**	1	4	**5**	1	2	1	-	-	1	3
19	(Spain) Pere Tomàs	02:11	-	-	-	-	-	-	-	-	-	-	-	-	-	-
22	(France) Jérôme Moïso	25:43	2/4	4/8	-	**10**	2	5	**7**	-	1	-	4	-	3	3
	**TEAM**	200:00	10/13	21/32	9/31	**79**	14	19	**33**	9	13	8	6	1	17	17

Notes: # - Player number; Min played - Minutes played; Points - FT: Free Throws, 2FG: 2-point Field Goals, 3FG: 3-point Field Goals, TOT: Total points; Rebounds - Off: Offensive, Def: Defensive, TOT: Total rebounds; Blocks - Fv: In Favor, Ag: Against; Fouls - Cm: Committed, Rv: Received; Players in bold were in starters
