= 2008 ULEB Cup Final Eight =

Main favourite for ULEB Cup trophy - Dynamo Moscow

ULEB Cup 2007–08 Final Eight was the final round of 2007–08 ULEB Cup, and there were eight teams, which won their matches in Sixteenth Finals and Eighth finals. The Final Eight was held in Turin, Italy, at the Torino Palavela arena. The matches were played from 10 to 13 April.

== Accommodation ==
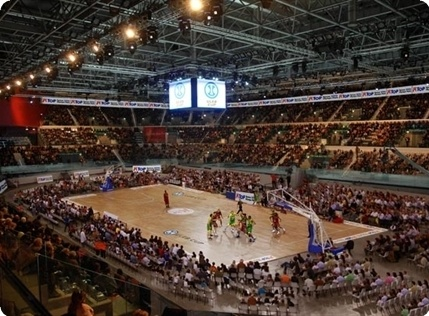
Torino Palavela now

=== Arena ===
The arena, which hosted the Final Eight, is Torino Palavela in Turin. It is used also for figure skating and ice hockey. For basketball the seating capacity of the arena is 9,200.

== Competition ==
=== Bracket ===
Quarterfinals
11 April
(Russia) Dynamo Moscow	78
(Poland) Turów Zgorzelec	63
11 April
(Spain) Akasvayu Girona	75
(Russia) UNICS	66
10 April
(Spain) DKV Joventut	77
(Spain) Pamesa Valencia	67
10 April
(Turkey) Beşiktaş Cola Turka	60
(Turkey) Galatasaray Café Crown	61

Semifinals
12 April
(Russia) Dynamo Moscow	78
(Spain) Akasvayu Girona	81
12 April
(Spain) DKV Joventut	90
(Turkey) Galatasaray Café Crown	83

Final
13 April
(Spain) Akasvayu Girona	54
(Spain) DKV Joventut	79
Third place game
13 April
(Russia) Dynamo Moscow	84
(Turkey) Galatasaray Café Crown	67

=== Results ===
==== Quarterfinals ====
10 April
18:30

(Report)

Beşiktaş Cola Turka (Turkey)	60–61	(Turkey) Galatasaray Cafe Crown
Scoring by quarter: 11-19, 13-16, 18-14, 18-12
Pts: Predrag Drobnjak 17; Rebs: Kaya Peker 7 Asts: Sandro Nicević 3		Pts: Robert Hite 22; Rebs: Charles Gaines 10; Asts: Dee Brown 3

Palavela, Turin
Attendance: 4,000
Referees: Garcia Ortiz (ESP), Jovcic (SRB), Jasevicius (LTU)

10 April
21:00

(Report)

DKV Joventut (Spain)	77–67	(Spain) Pamesa Valencia
Scoring by quarter: 25-16, 19-10, 17-11, 16-30
Pts: Demond Mallet 16; Rebs: Ricky Rubio 7 Asts: Rudy Fernández 5		Pts: Shammond Williams 25; Rebs: Shammond Williams 6 Asts: Williams, Milojević 3

Palavela, Turin
Attendance: 4,500
Referees: Cicoria (ITA), Belosevic (SRB), Viator (FRA)

11 April
18:30

(Report)

Dynamo Moscow (Russia)	78–63	(Poland) Turów Zgorzelec
Scoring by quarter: 25-17, 18-24, 18-11, 17-14
Pts: Henry Domercant 22; Rebs: Antonis Fotsis 6 Asts: Samoilenko, Vujanić 3		Pts: David Logan 19; Rebs: David Logan 7 Asts: Andres Rodriguez 4

Palavela, Turin
Attendance: 4,790
Referees: Pukl (SLO), Christodoulou (GRE), Perez Pizarro (ESP)

11 April
21:00

(Report)

Akasvayu Girona (Spain)	75–66	(Russia) UNICS Kazan
Scoring by quarter: 25-24, 11-12, 23-14, 16-16
Pts: McDonald, Gasol 19; Rebs: Víctor Sada 6 Asts: Víctor Sada 8		Pts: Chikalkin, Savanović 12; Rebs: Tariq Kirksay 7 Asts: Tariq Kirksay 4

Palavela, Turin
Attendance: 4,790
Referees: Facchini (ITA), Rocha (POR), Lefwerth (SWE)

==== Semifinals ====
12 April
18:30

(Report)

DKV Joventut (Spain)	90–83	(Turkey) Galatasaray Cafe Crown
Scoring by quarter: 27-17, 20-20, 21-23, 22-23
Pts: Rudy Fernández 27; Rebs: Jérôme Moïso 9 Asts: Ricky Rubio 5		Pts: Robert Hite 28; Rebs: Chris Owens 12; Asts: Owens, Brown 4

Palavela, Turin
Attendance: 5,060
Referees: Facchini (ITA), Pukl (SLO), Rocha (POR)

12 April
21:00

(Report)

Dynamo Moscow (Russia)	78–81	(Spain) Akasvayu Girona
Scoring by quarter: 20-23, 15-15, 14-26, 29-17
Pts: Henry Domercant 20; Rebs: Robertas Javtokas 10; Asts: Miloš Vujanić 6		Pts: Ivan Radenović 20; Rebs: Daniels, Radenović 7 Asts: Víctor Sada 7

Palavela, Turin
Attendance: 5,060
Referees: Cicoria (ITA), Jovcic (SRB), Jasevicius (LTU)

==== Third Place ====
13 April
15:30

(Report)

Dynamo Moscow (Russia)	84–67	(Turkey) Galatasaray Cafe Crown
Scoring by quarter: 26-8, 18-23, 13-17, 27-19
Pts: Sergei Monia 17; Rebs: Robertas Javtokas 9 Asts: Sergei Bykov 4		Pts: Erdem Türetken 16; Rebs: Gaines 8 Asts: Kaya, Erden 4

Palavela, Turin
Attendance: 5,060
Referees: Garcia Ortiz (ESP), Christodoulou (GRE), Perez Pizarro (ESP)

==== Final ====
13 April
18:30

(Report)

Akasvayu Girona (Spain)	54–79	(Spain) DKV Joventut
Scoring by quarter: 21-16, 6-18, 10-24, 17-21
Pts: Ivan Radenović 20; Rebs: Marc Gasol 10; Asts: Víctor Sada 5		Pts: Demond Mallet 26; Rebs: Luboš Bartoň 8 Asts: Pau Ribas 3

Palavela, Turin
Attendance: 5,060
Referees: Facchini (ITA), Belosevic (SRB), Viator (FRA)

Girona	Joventut
