= Franco Levi =

Italian engineer (1914–2009)

Franco Levi (September 20, 1914 in Turin – January 10, 2009) was an Italian engineer. He is known for his involvement in drafting the first Eurocode as a leading member of European regulatory bodies, and was a prominent academic involved in structural engineering research.

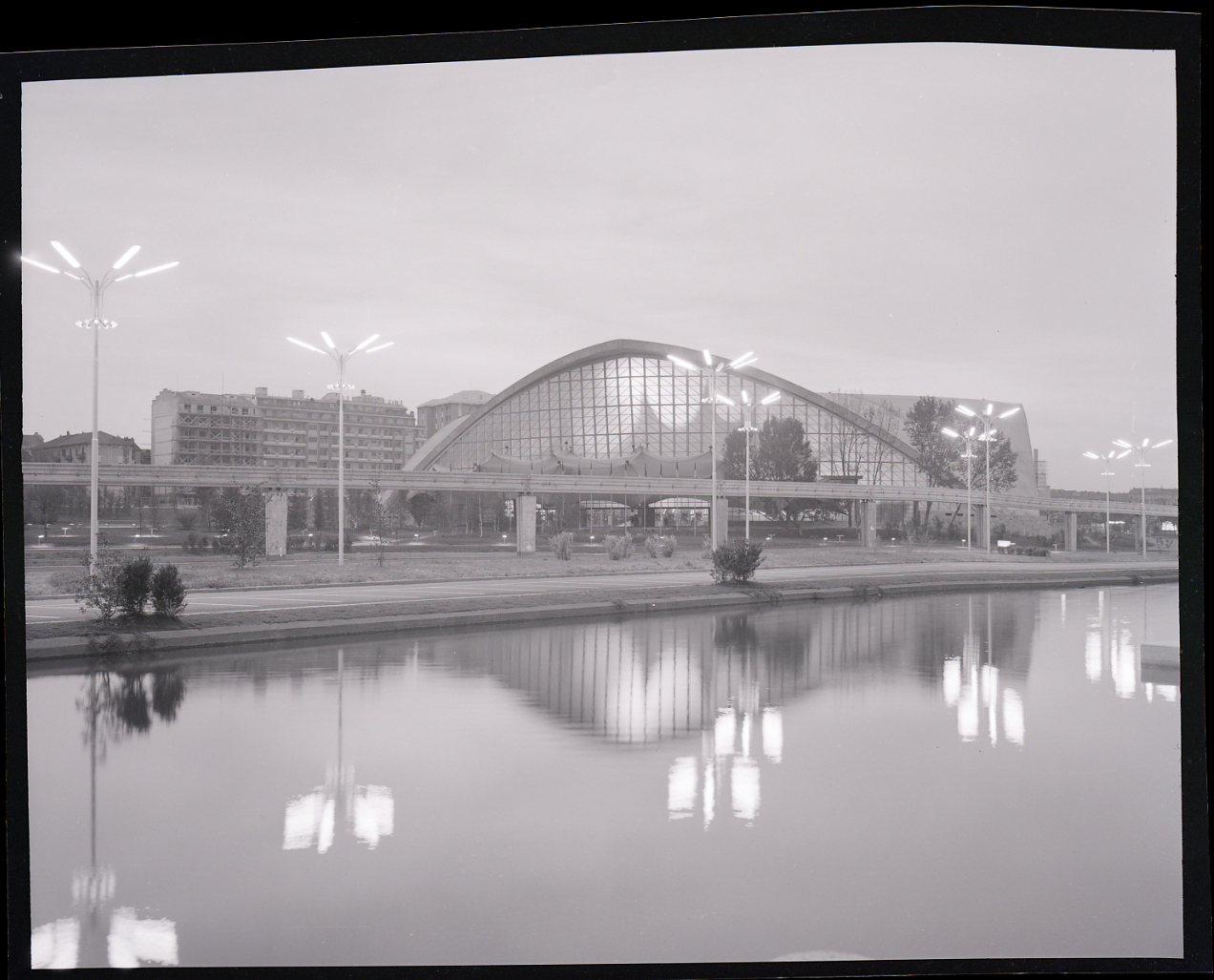
Palazzo a Vela, Turin (with Annibale Rigotti). Photo by Paolo Monti, 1961.

== Education ==
Levi received his degree in Engineering from the Ecole Centrale in Paris and from the Polytechnic University of Turin in the years 1936 and 1937. Already assistant to Professor Gustavo Colonnetti in Turin, in 1938 he had to go into exile to France and later on to Switzerland due to the anti-Semitic laws.

== Career ==
=== Research in Turin ===
Back in Italy in 1945, he was able to resume his research at the Polytechnic University of Turin. This work was covering the most recent topics of structural mechanics and engineering, and he published papers and books on the theory of states of coaction, on plastic theory, and on the time-dependent behaviour of concrete structures, with particular regard to creep effects. He designed the Torino Palavela.

His attention was attracted by the need of a quick transfer of scientific advancement to the practical design and construction of structures. The opportunity for that action was the development of the new technique of pre-stressed concrete, in which he was scientifically involved since 1938, during his first research period. After the war, since 1945 to 1961, as Director of the CNR Consiglio Nazionale delle Ricerche (Italian National Research Council) in Turin, Franco Levi had an essential role in the international discussion on the theoretical and practical aspects of this innovative technique and on the establishment of design rules to be internationally agreed.

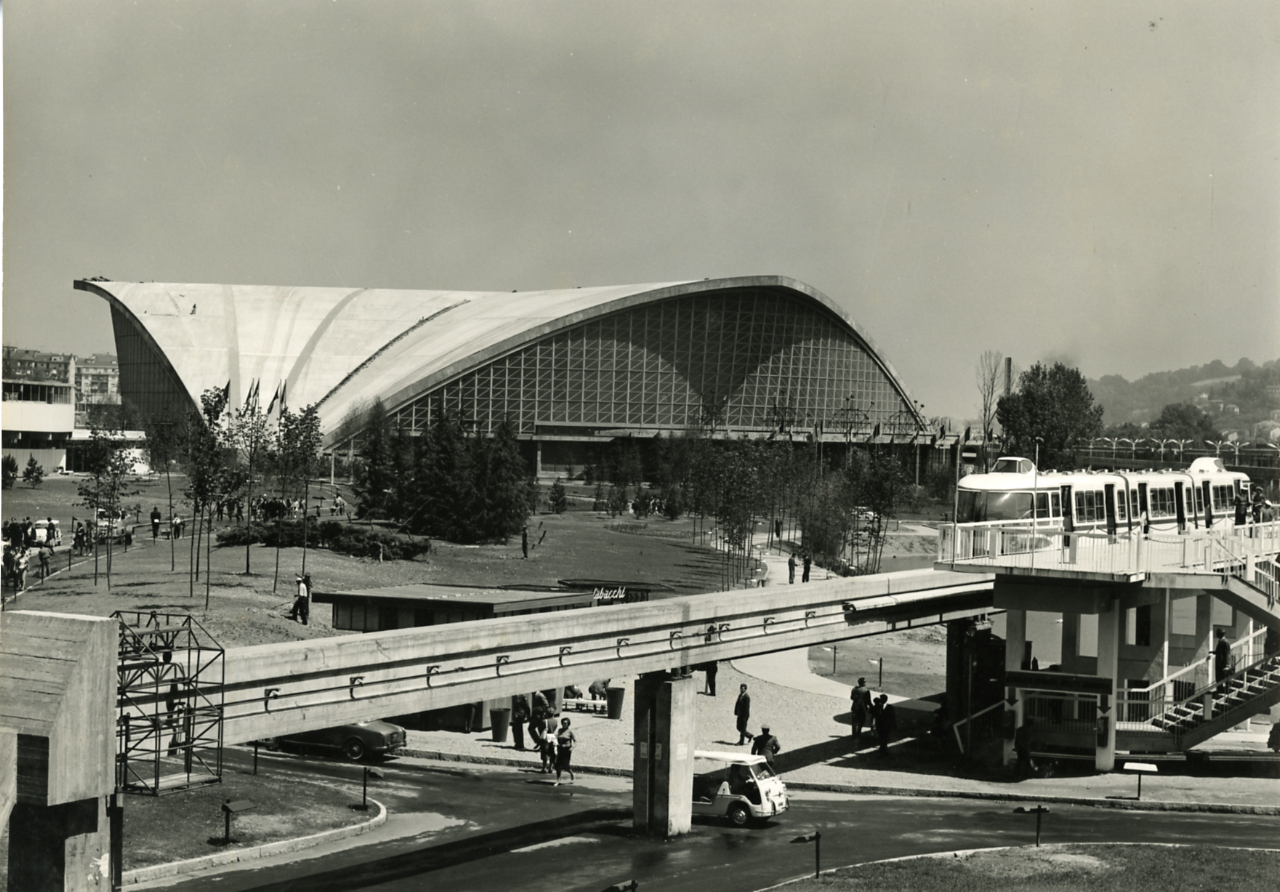
Panoramic view of Expo 61 with Palazzo a Vela in 1961, photographed by Paolo Monti.

=== Material innovation ===
The innovation of prestressed concrete, together with the new approaches of plastic design and of probabilistic safety criteria induced the most advanced specialists of structural design and analysis to install in 1953 a new committee (Comité Européen du Béton – CEB) having the objective of a coordination and synthesis of research and of the creation and international harmonization of the principles and rules for the conception, calculation, construction, and maintenance of concrete structures according to the new approaches.

=== Involvement in European scientific organisations ===
Franco Levi was appointed President of CEB from 1957 and maintained this position until 1968, leading this organization to the publication of the first and the second set of CEB Recommendations.

Between 1966 and 1970 he was also President of the ”Fédération Internationale de la Précontrainte – FIP”, which had the role of promoting the innovative technique in the practical field. In 1979 the European Community considered the work of CEB ripe to become the basis for the first Eurocode; Franco Levi was appointed Chairman of the Drafting Committee for Eurocode 2 (Concrete Structures). Eurocode 2 was printed by CEC in the famous Luxemburg edition 1988, together with EC1, EC3, EC6, EC8. Franco Levi had an essential role in the coordination of the drafting of such 5 Eurocodes based on the same criteria of the “Limit States” and on what was called the “Semiprobabilistic approach”. This format still remains the format of the subsequent set of Eurocodes issued by CEN TC 250 (Structural Eurocodes).

In the same time he was Professor of Structural Analysis at the University of Venice and at the Polytechnic University of Turin and Director of the Department of Structural Engineering and Soil Mechanics until 1989, when he became Emeritus.

== Recognition ==
In 1986 he became Full Member of the Academy of Sciences of Turin. He received honours from the Universities of Liège, Waterloo, Venice, the American Concrete Institute, AICAP, and the Trasenster, Freyssinet, Mörsch, Caquot, Torroja Medals, as well as the Golden Medal of the Italian Government.
