= GEW =

GEW may refer to:

- Education and Science Workers' Union (Germany) (German: Gewerkschaft Erziehung und Wissenschaft)
- Gera language of Nigeria
- Abbreviation of Gewehr (German for a long-barrelled firearm), in the names for various firearms
- GEW Energy Dome, a sports arena in Cologne, Germany
