= 2002–03 ULEB Cup Top 16 =

== Eighth-final 1 ==
| | Home team | Score | Away team | Venue | Attendance | Date |
|---|---|---|---|---|---|---|
| Game 1 | Spirou Charleroi (Belgium) | 64–56 | (Spain) DKV Joventut | Spiroudome, Charleroi | 5000 | February 4, 2003 |
| Game 2 | DKV Joventut (Spain) | 73–57 | (Belgium) Spirou Charleroi | Pabellon Municipal, Badalona | 7869 | February 11, 2003 |

== Eighth-final 2 ==
| | Home team | Score | Away team | Venue | Attendance | Date |
|---|---|---|---|---|---|---|
| Game 1 | Generali Group Trieste (Italy) | 73–91 | (Serbia and Montenegro) FMP Zeleznik | PalaTrieste, Trieste | 1000 | February 4, 2003 |
| Game 2 | FMP Zeleznik (Serbia and Montenegro) | 81–86 | (Italy) Generali Group Trieste | Železnik Hall, Belgrade | 1500 | February 11, 2003 |

== Eighth-final 3 ==
| | Home team | Score | Away team | Venue | Attendance | Date |
|---|---|---|---|---|---|---|
| Game 1 | Ural Great Perm (Russia) | 84–79 | (Spain) Caprabo Lleida | Molot Sport, Perm | 7000 | February 4, 2003 |
| Game 2 | Caprabo Lleida (Spain) | 86–69 | (Russia) Ural Great Perm | Pavello Barris Nord, Lleida | 4600 | February 11, 2003 |

== Eighth-final 4 ==
| | Home team | Score | Away team | Venue | Attendance | Date |
|---|---|---|---|---|---|---|
| Game 1 | Pivovarna Laško (Slovenia) | 78–79 | (Slovenia) Krka Novo Mesto | Tri Lilije Hall, Laško | 500 | February 4, 2003 |
| Game 2 | Krka Novo Mesto (Slovenia) | 76–69 | (Slovenia) Pivovarna Laško | Leon Štukelj Hall, Novo Mesto | 2000 | February 11, 2003 |

== Eighth-final 5 ==
| | Home team | Score | Away team | Venue | Attendance | Date |
|---|---|---|---|---|---|---|
| Game 1 | RheinEnergie Cologne (Germany) | 72–76 | (Spain) Pamesa Valencia | GEW Energy Dome, Köln | 2400 | February 4, 2003 |
| Game 2 | Pamesa Valencia (Spain) | 93–84 | (Germany) RheinEnergie Cologne | Fuente San Luis, Valencia | 7300 | February 11, 2003 |

== Eighth-final 6 ==
| | Home team | Score | Away team | Venue | Attendance | Date |
|---|---|---|---|---|---|---|
| Game 1 | KK Zadar (Croatia) | 94–71 | (France) Gravelines Dunkerque | Jazine Basketball Hall, Zadar | 2500 | February 4, 2003 |
| Game 2 | Gravelines Dunkerque (France) | 78–64 | (Croatia) KK Zadar | Sportica, Gravelines | 2800 | February 11, 2003 |

== Eighth-final 7 ==
| | Home team | Score | Away team | Venue | Attendance | Date |
|---|---|---|---|---|---|---|
| Game 1 | Eurocellulari Roseto (Italy) | 80–72 | (Spain) Adecco Estudiantes | Palazzo Dello Sport, Roseto | 1500 | February 4, 2003 |
| Game 2 | Adecco Estudiantes (Spain) | 84–68 | (Italy) Eurocellulari Roseto | Palacio Vistalegre, Madrid | 8500 | February 11, 2003 |

== Eighth-final 8 ==
| | Home team | Score | Away team | Venue | Attendance | Date |
|---|---|---|---|---|---|---|
| Game 1 | Snadeiro Udine (Italy) | 83–77 | (Italy) Metis Varese | Palasport Primo Carnera, Udine | 1550 | February 4, 2003 |
| Game 1 | Metis Varese (Italy) | 73–59 | (Italy) Snadeiro Udine | Palasport Lino Orldrini, Varese | 3994 | February 11, 2003 |
