= IVA 65 =

Transportation exhibition held in Munich

1965 Munich
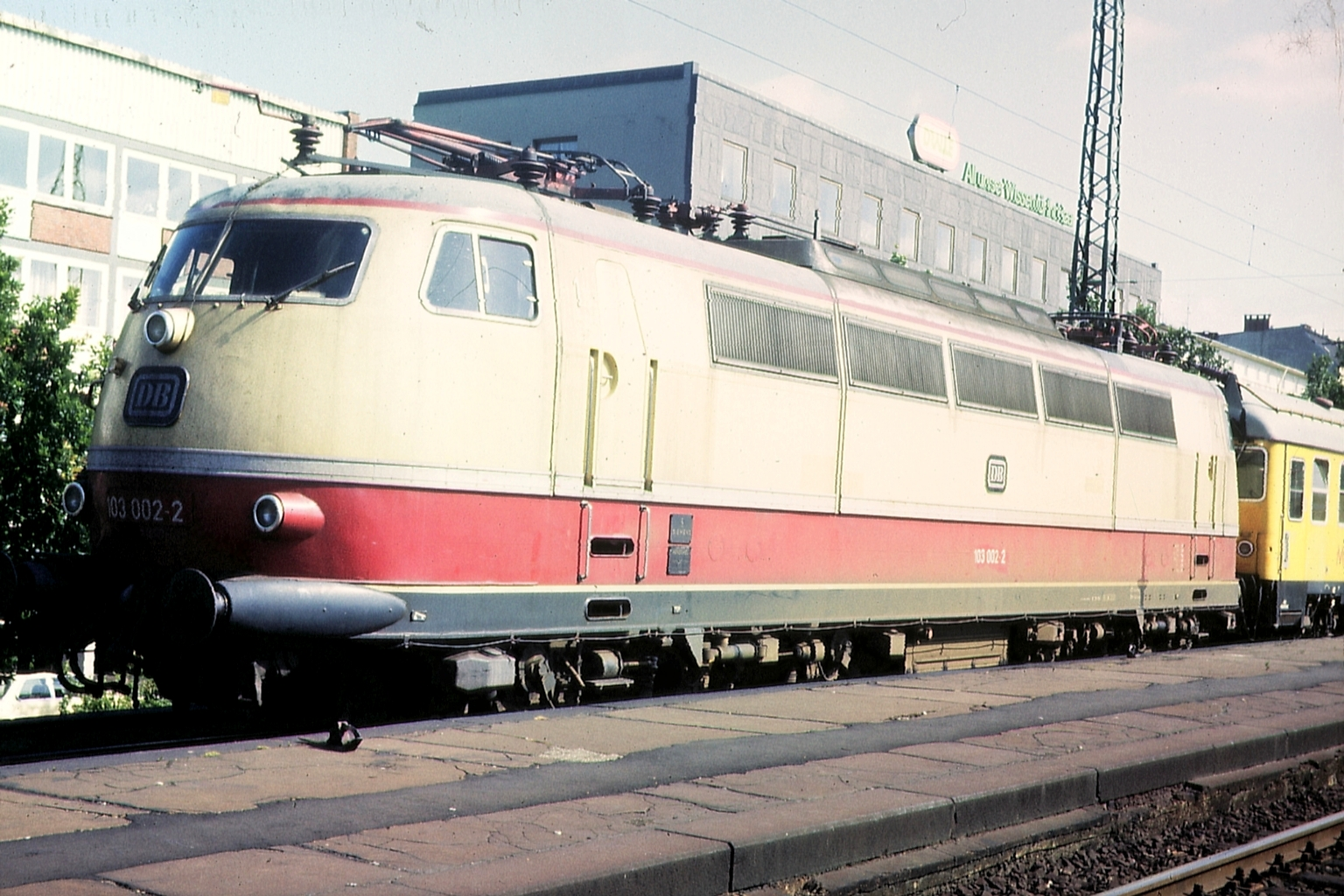
- The E 03 high speed locomotive

Overview
- BIE-class: Specialized exposition
- Name: Internationale Verkehrsausstellung 65
- Area: 50 hectares (120 acres)
- Visitors: 2,5 mln

Participant(s)
- Countries: 31

Location
- Country: West Germany
- City: Munich
- Venue: Bavaria park
- Coordinates: 48°07′42″N 11°32′37″E

Timeline
- Awarded: November 13, 1962
- Opening: June 25, 1965
- Closure: October 3, 1965

Specialized expositions
- Previous: Expo 61 in Turin
- Next: HemisFair '68 in San Antonio

Universal expositions
- Previous: Century 21 Exposition in Seattle
- Next: Expo 67 in Montreal

The IVA 65, (full name Internationale Verkehrsausstellung 65) was a world's transportation exhibition held in Munich in 1965. It was the 16th specialized exhibition recognized by the Bureau International des Expositions (BIE).

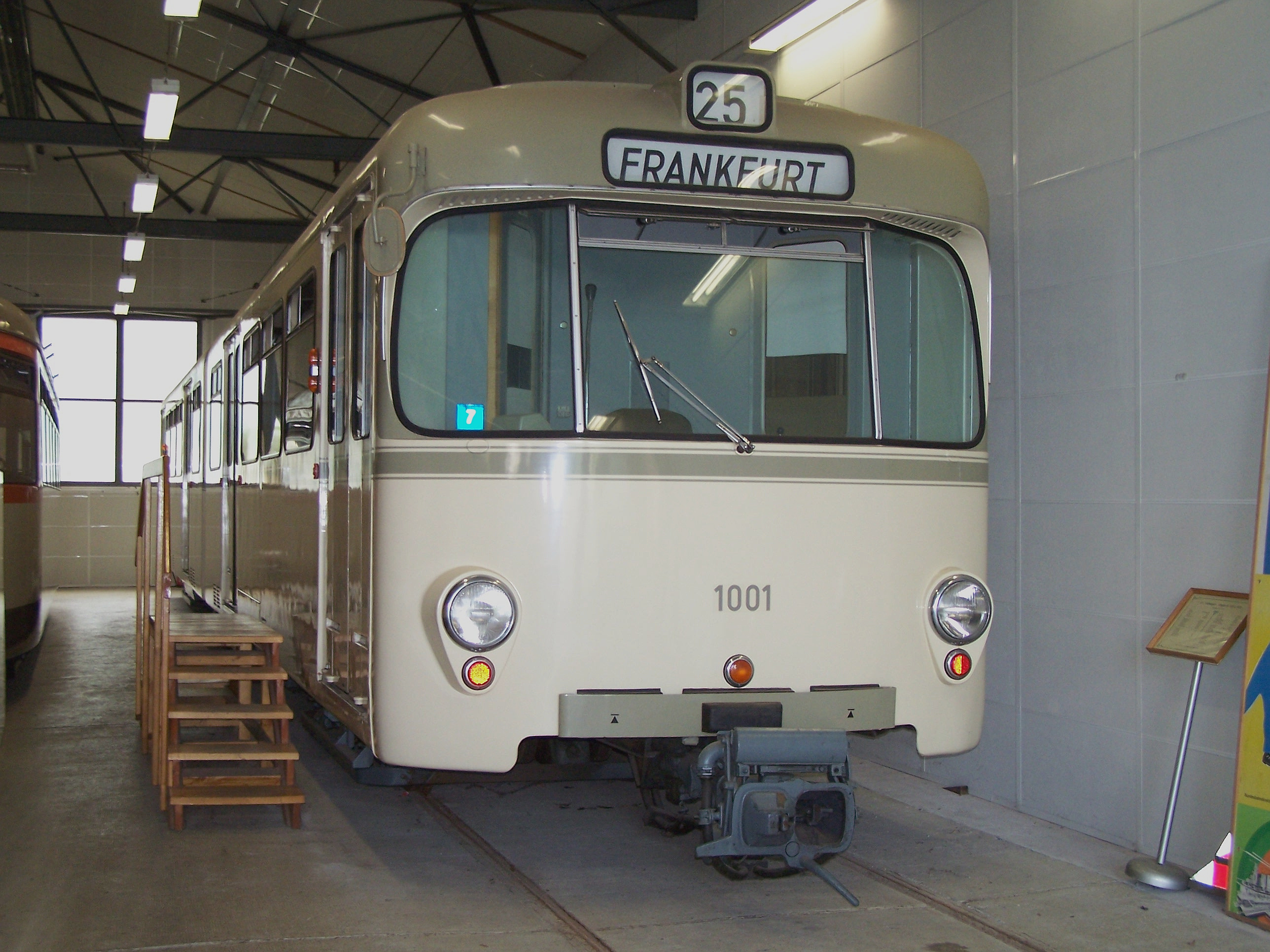
Frankfurt am Main Underground prototype

The IVA 65 was the international follow up from the Deutsche Verkehrsausstellung (German transportation fairs) held between 1924 and 1953 in Germany. The focus always had been the German rail traffic and Germany presented the prototypes of the Frankfurt underground rolling stock and the high speed locomotive class E03. The E03 hauled the trains from the Augsburg - Munich service with a scheduled 200 km/h during the exhibition. Besides the railtraffic, navigation, aerospace and roadtraffic got their share in the Bavariapark. The IVA was repeated twice until German reunification. After 1996 the InnoTrans has been held every two years, because of its commercial character these exhibitions have not been recognized by the BIE.

== See also ==
Internationale Verkehrsausstellung
