= LEB Oro Final Four MVP =

The Liga Espanola Baloncesto Oro (LEB Oro) Final Four MVP is an annual basketball award of the LEB Oro. It is awarded to the best player of the entire Finals series.

== Winners ==
Season	Position	Final Four MVP	Club	Ref.
2016–17	C	(Serbia) Goran Huskić	(Spain) San Pablo Inmobiliaria Burgos	
2017–18	PF	(Spain) Jordi Trias	(Spain) Bàsquet Manresa	
2018–19	PG	(Austria) Thomas Schreiner	(Spain) RETAbet Bilbao Basket	
2019–20	Not awarded			
2020–21	SG	(United States) Adam Sollazo	(Spain) Río Breogán	
2021–22	C	(Spain) Marc Gasol	(Spain) Bàsquet Girona	
