= Expo 61 =

1911 world's fair in Italy

1961 Turin
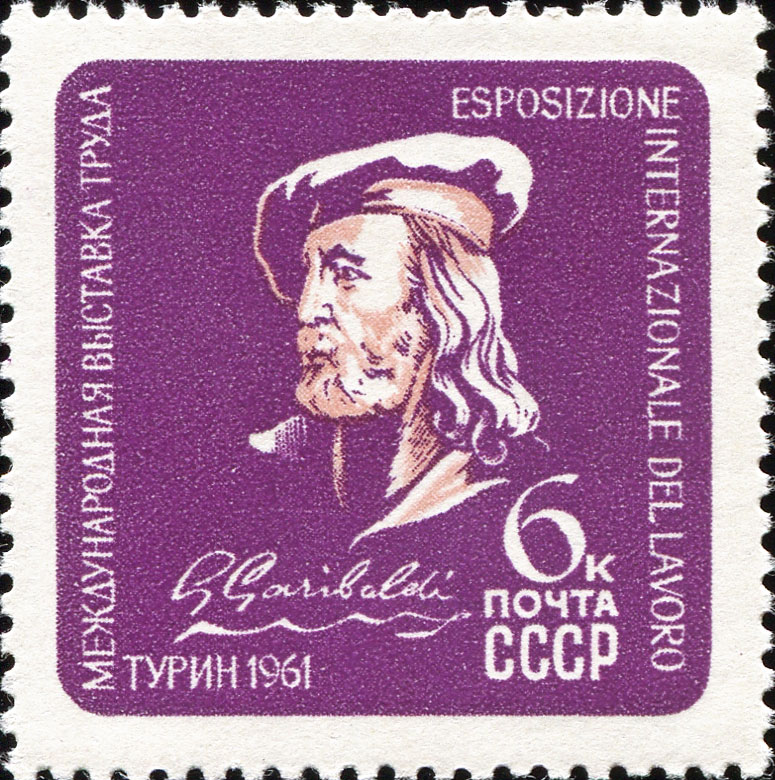
- 1961 Soviet Union stamp marking Expo 61 and depicting Giuseppe Garibaldi

Overview
- BIE-class: Specialized exposition
- Name: Esposizione Internazionale del Lavoro 1961
- Building(s): Palazzo del Lavoro

Location
- Country: Italy
- City: Turin
- Venue: Corso Unità d'Italia
- Coordinates: 45°01′20″N 07°40′18″E

Timeline
- Awarded: 5 May 1959
- Opening: 1 May 1961
- Closure: 31 October 1961

Specialized expositions
- Previous: Interbau in Berlin
- Next: IVA 65 in Munich

Universal expositions
- Previous: Expo 58 in Brussels
- Next: Century 21 Exposition in Seattle

Expo 61 was the international labour exhibition held in 1961 in the Italian City of Turin. It was the 15th specialized exposition recognized by the Bureau International des Expositions (BIE). Italy used the opportunity to expand the event with an exposition celebrating the centennial of Italian unity. The result is that the exhibition is widely remembered as Italia '61.

== The labour exhibition ==
The international part of the Expo 61 was held in the purpose-built Palazzo del Lavoro (Labour Palace) designed by the Italian architect Pier Luigi Nervi. The roof is supported by 16 pillars each 25 meters high, each supporting a 38 x 38 meter concrete element. Glass panels between the concrete elements allow daylight into the 25.000 m^{2} hall. The walls are made of glass panels supported by a metal frame at the outside of the building.

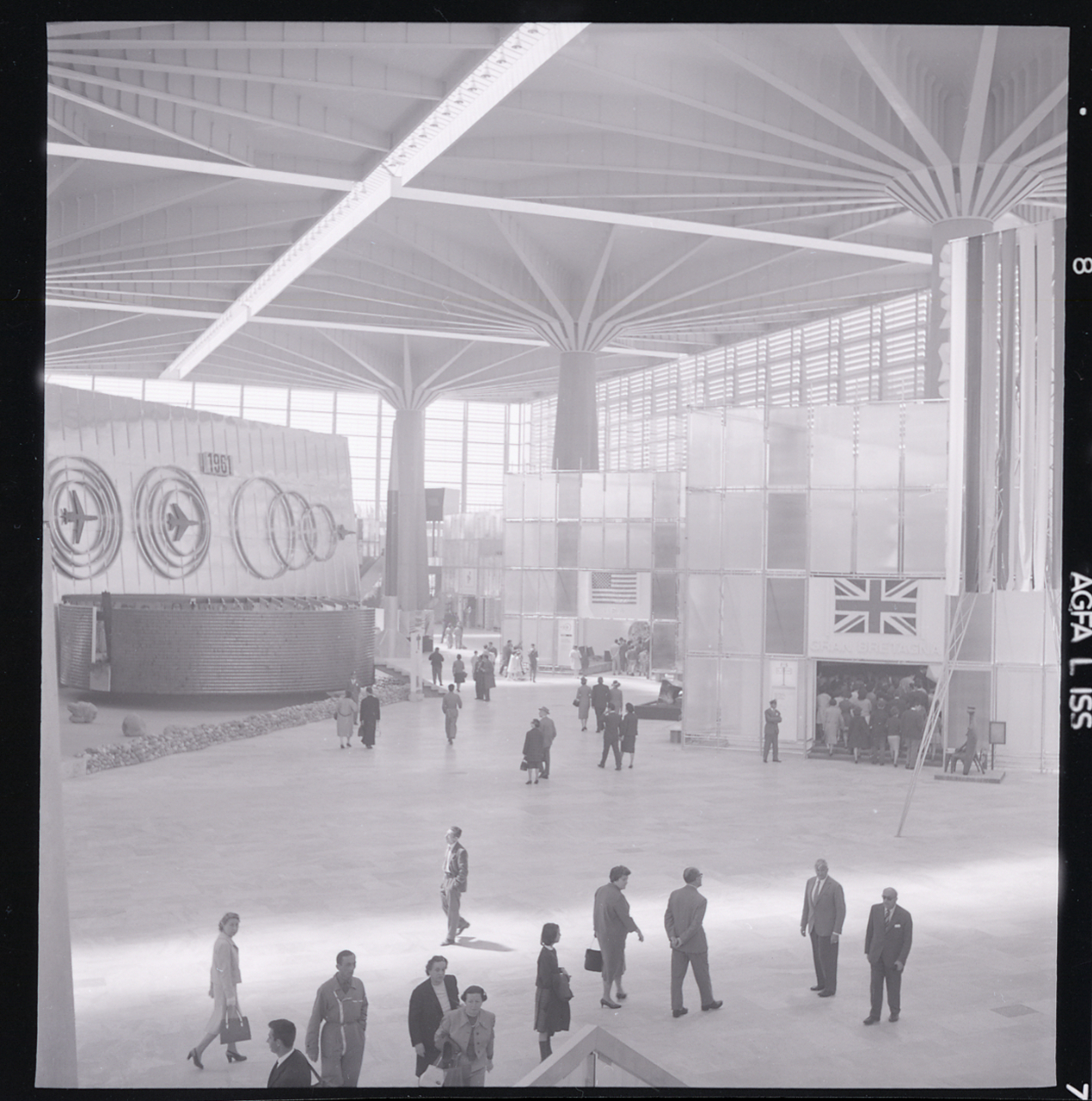

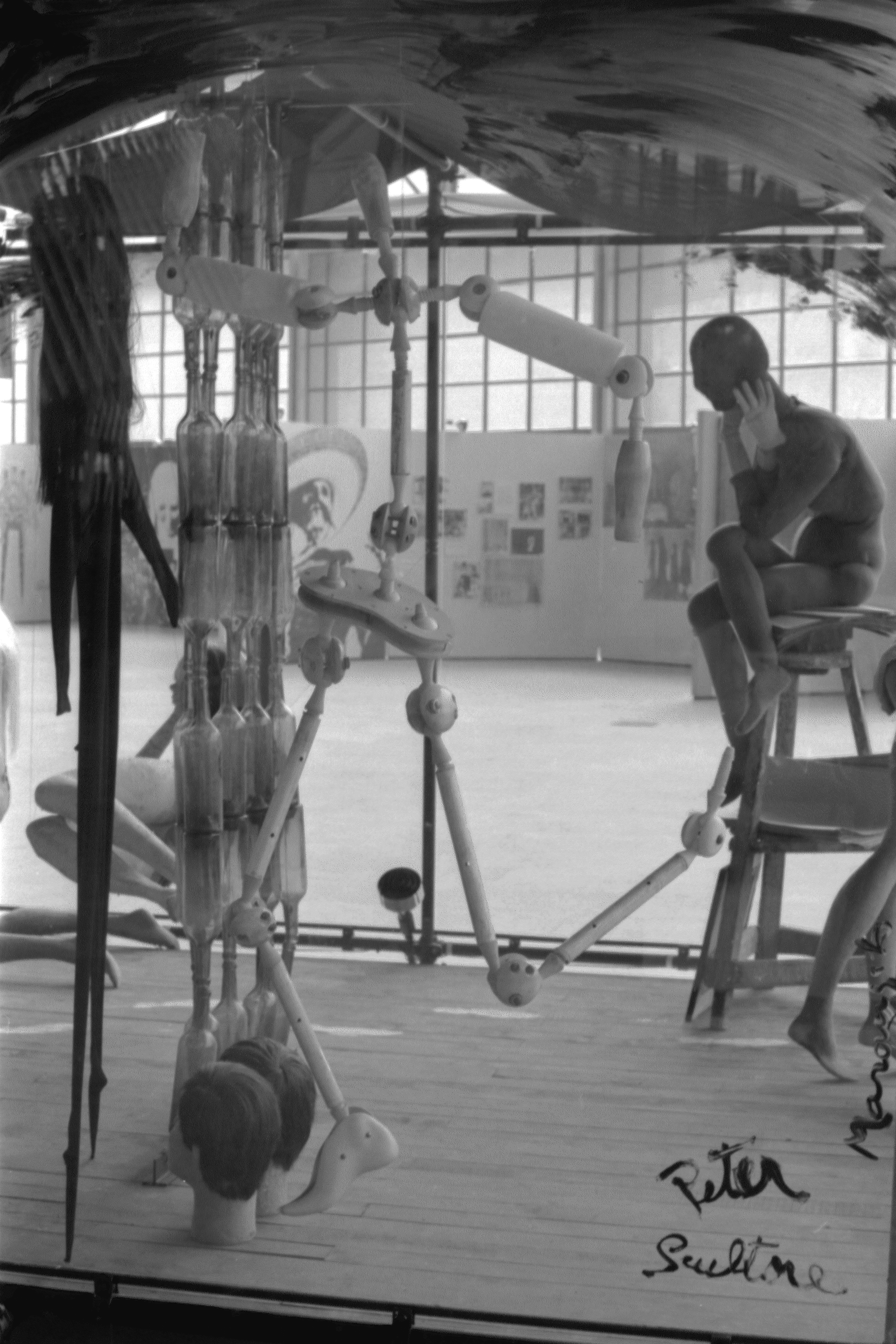

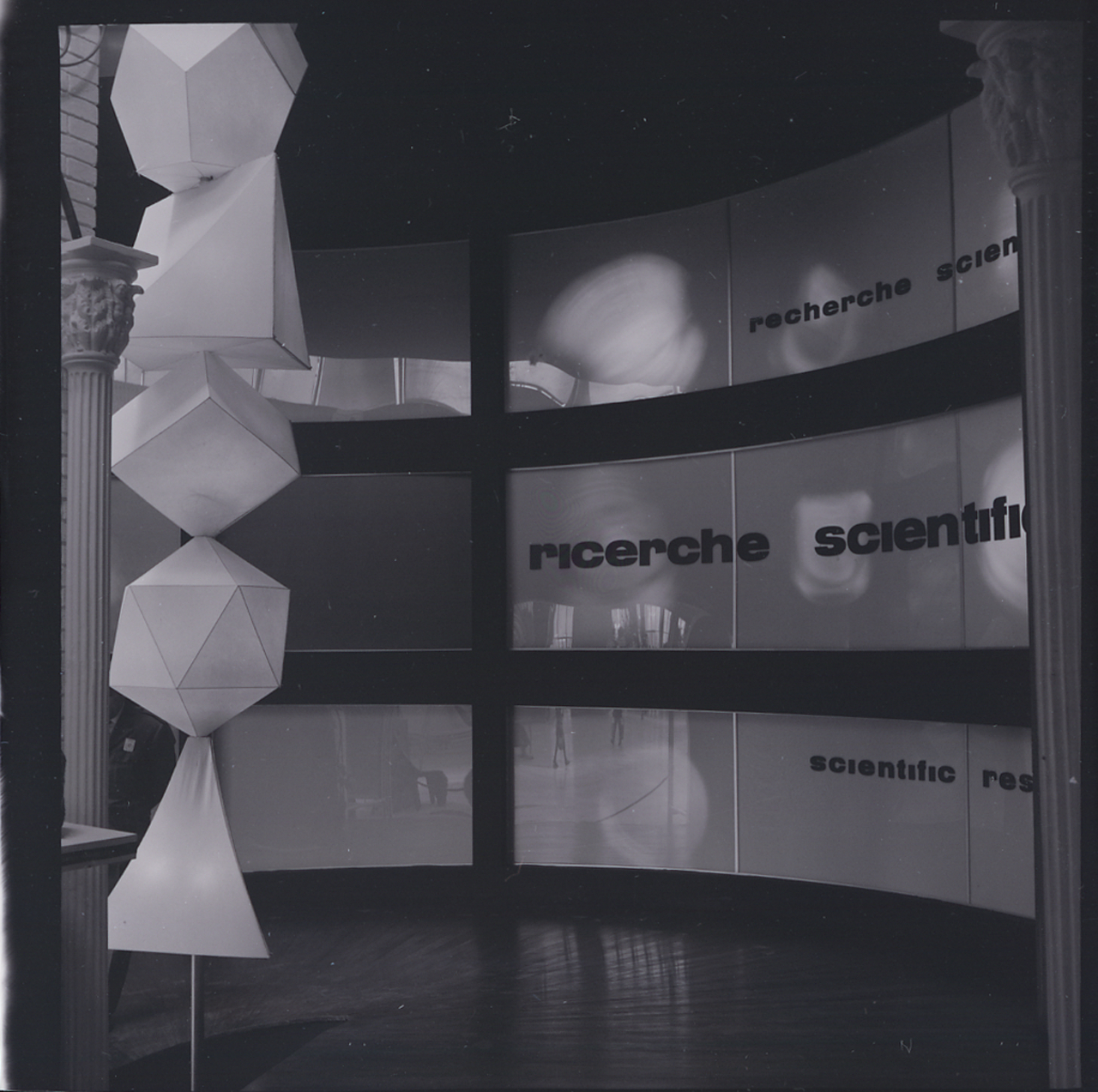

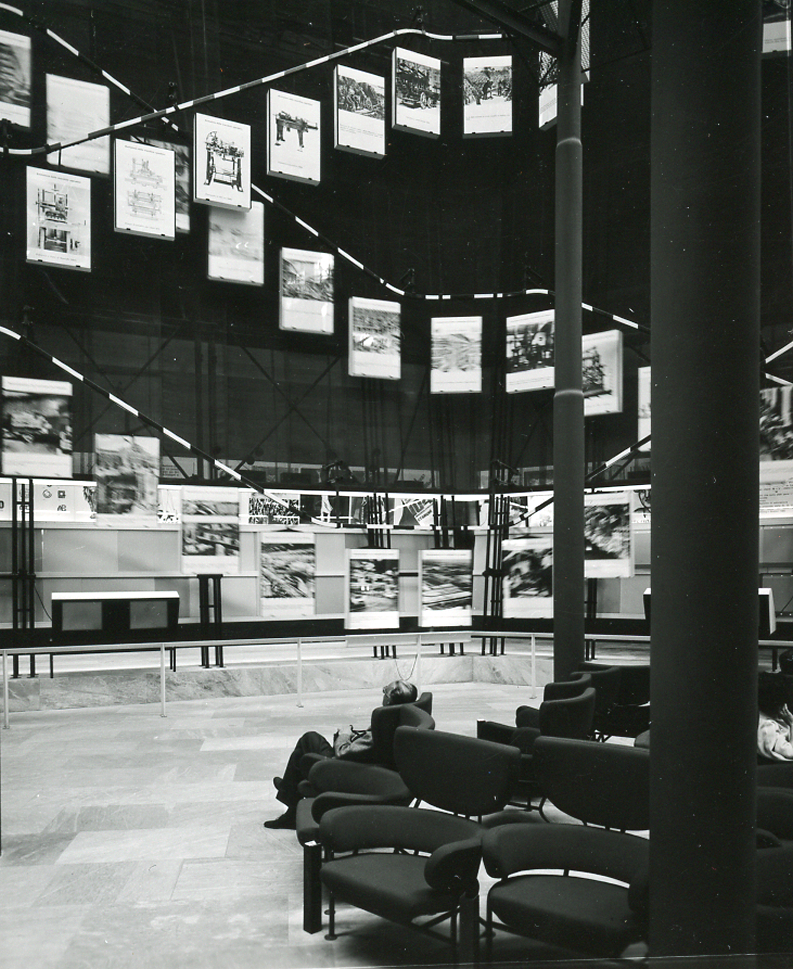

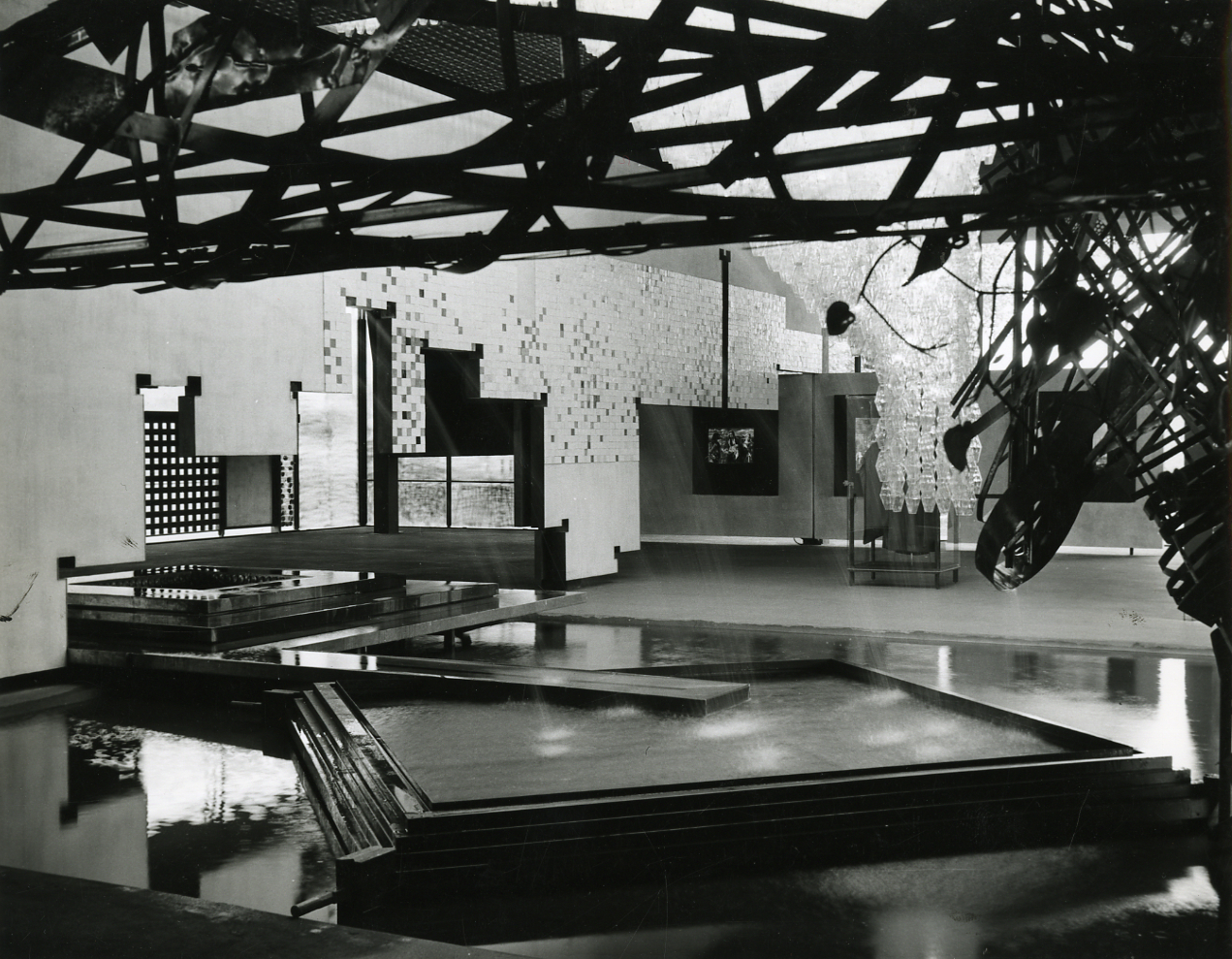

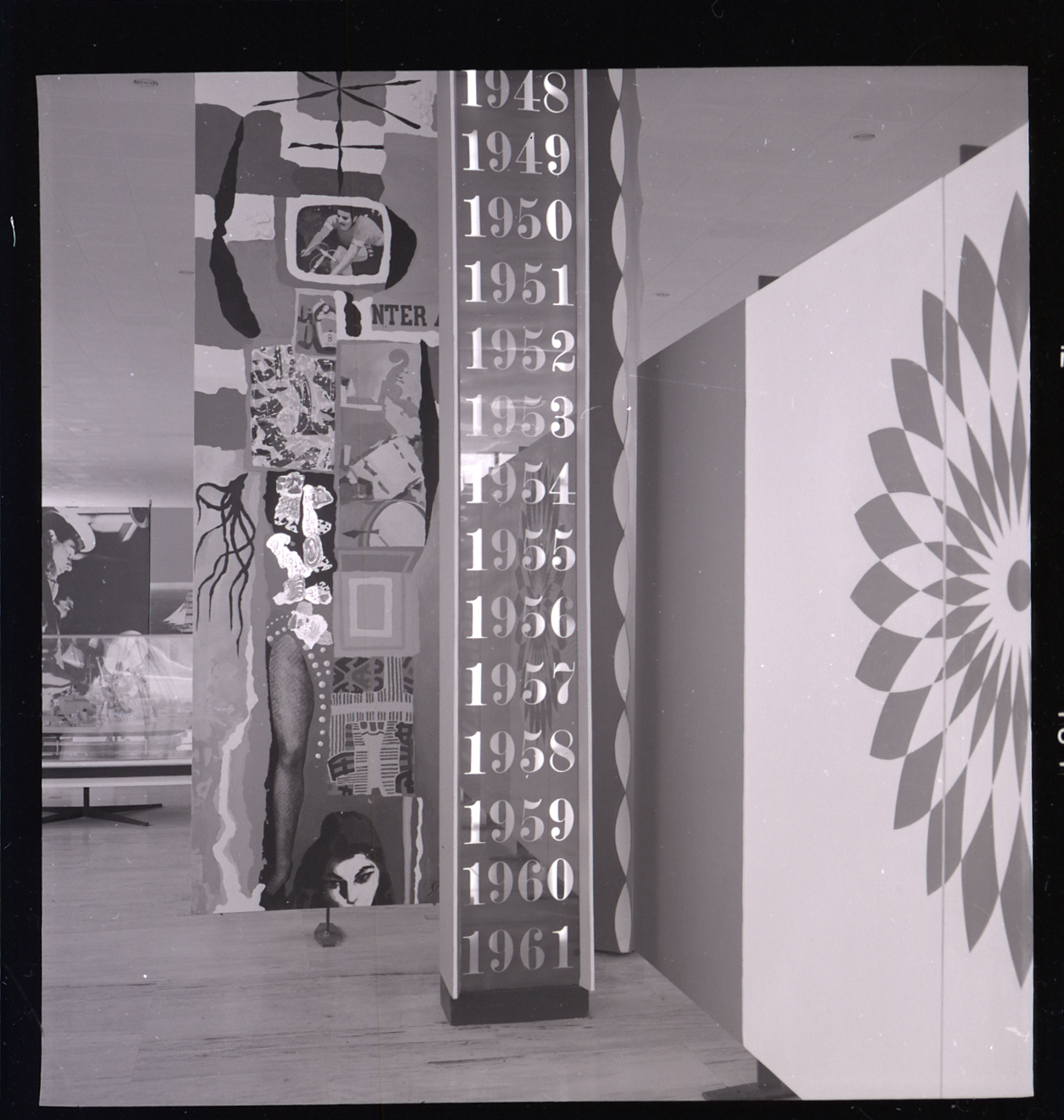

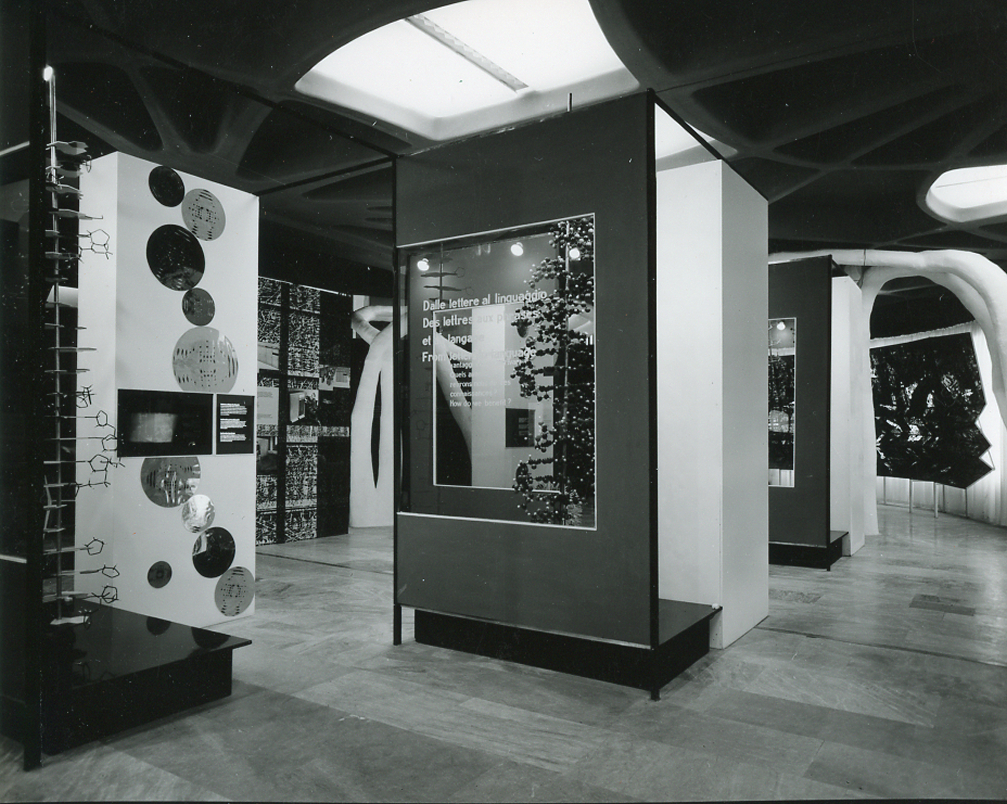

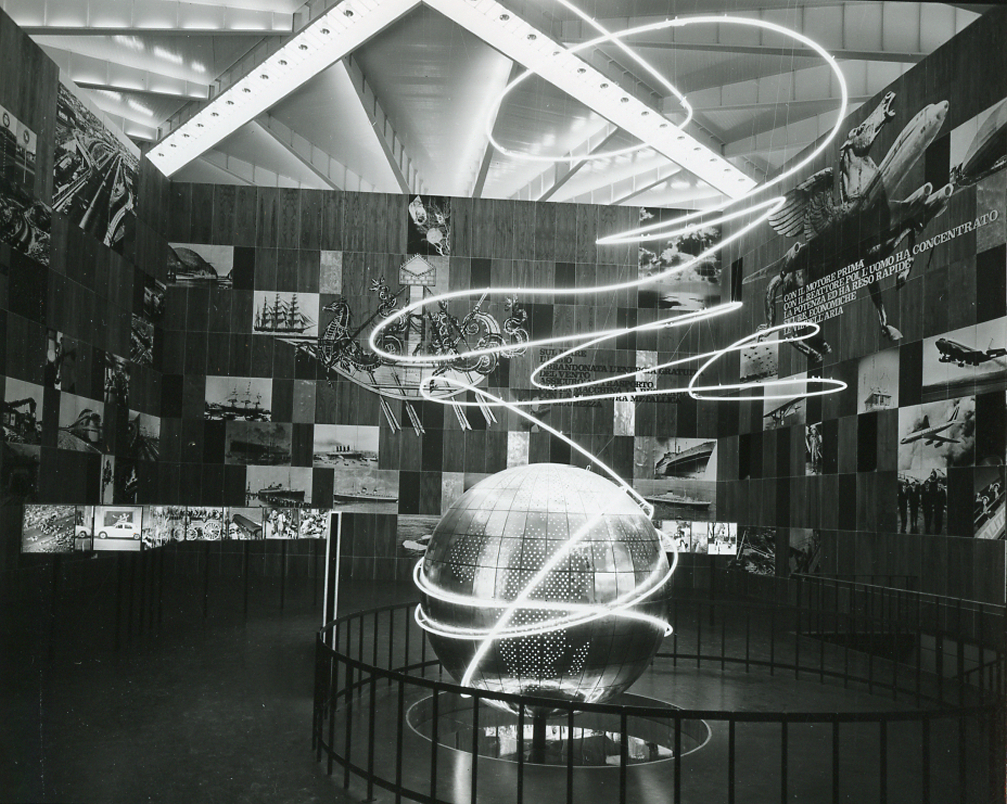

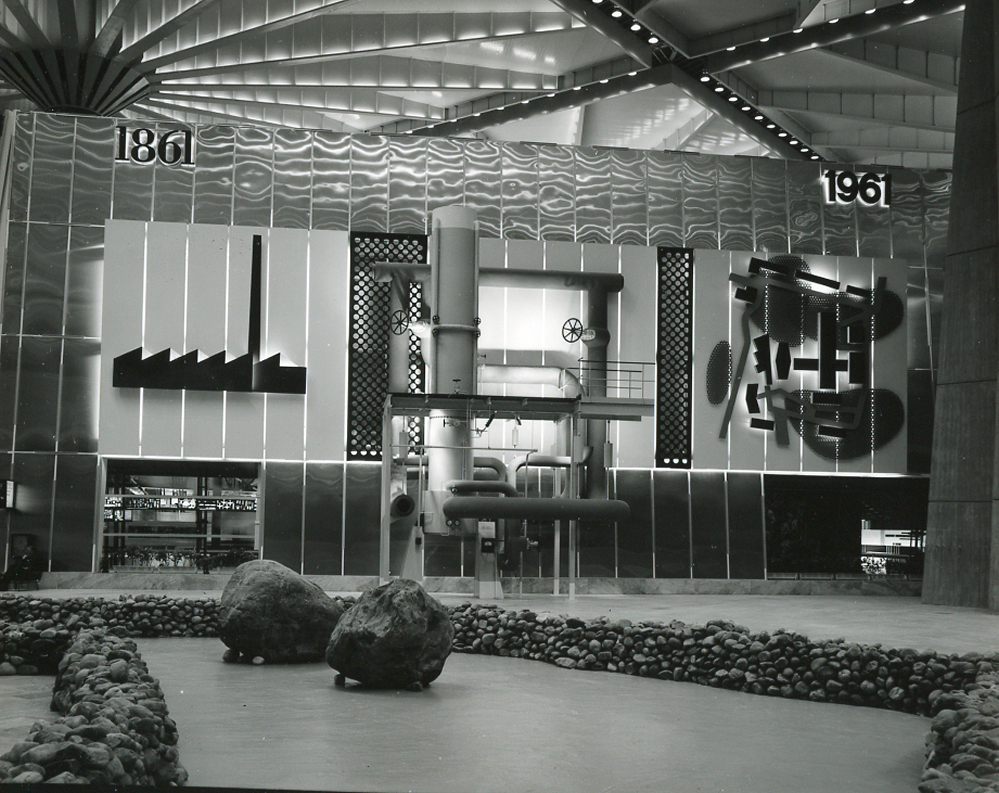

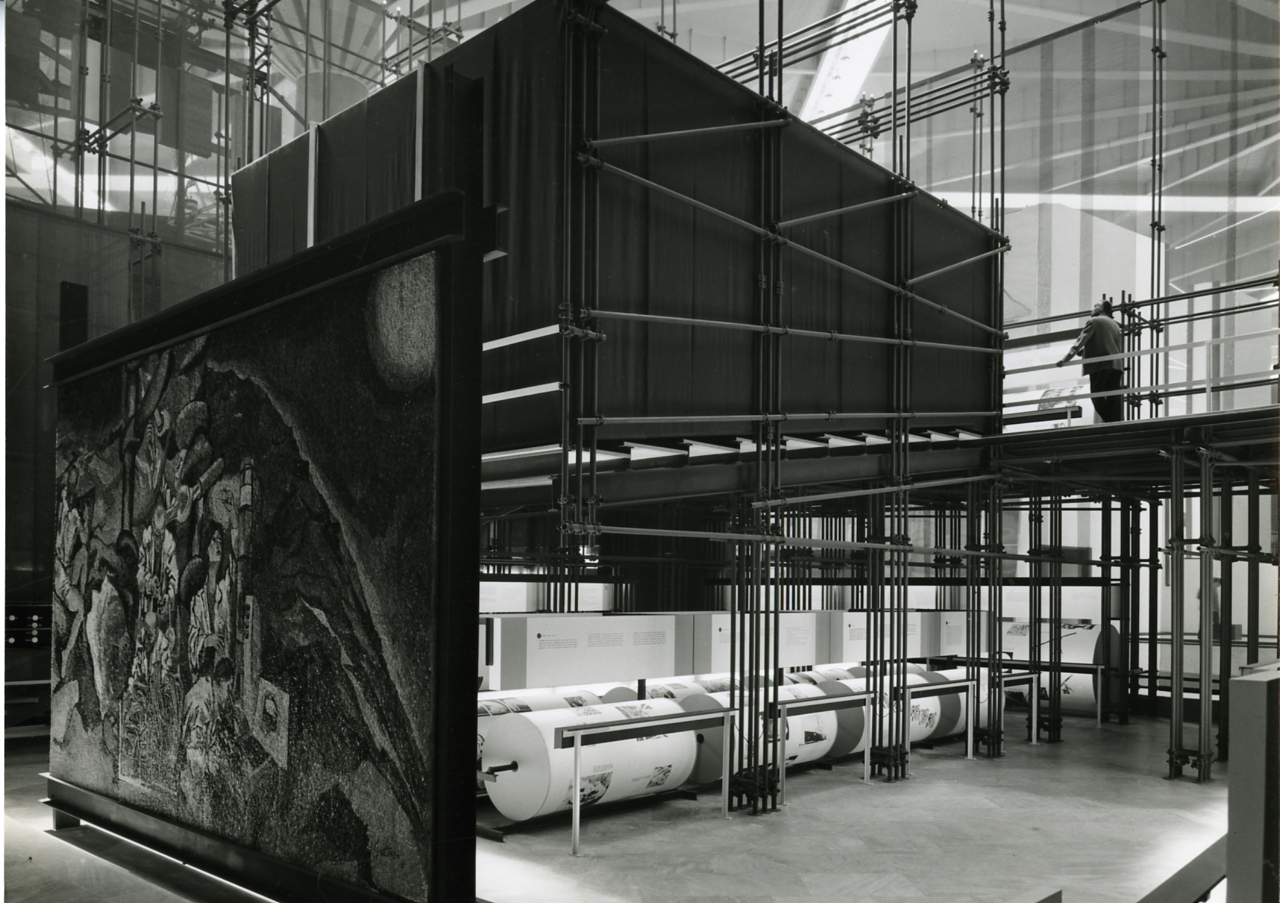

== Italia '61 ==
The Italian part of the Expo 61 was located between the Palazzo del Lavoro and the car museum, two kilometers north. The Italian provinces were represented with pavilions along the river Po at the east side of the Corso Unità d'Italia (Lane of Italian Unity). At the west side an event centre, the Palavela, was built. During the 2006 Winter Olympics this hall was used as venue for figure skating and short-track. Visitors could use a monorail for an 1800m ride between the northern entrance at the car museum and the Palazzo del Lavoro at the south side of the exposition. An aerial cableway provided access to the Parco Europa, a viewpoint at the other side of the Po.

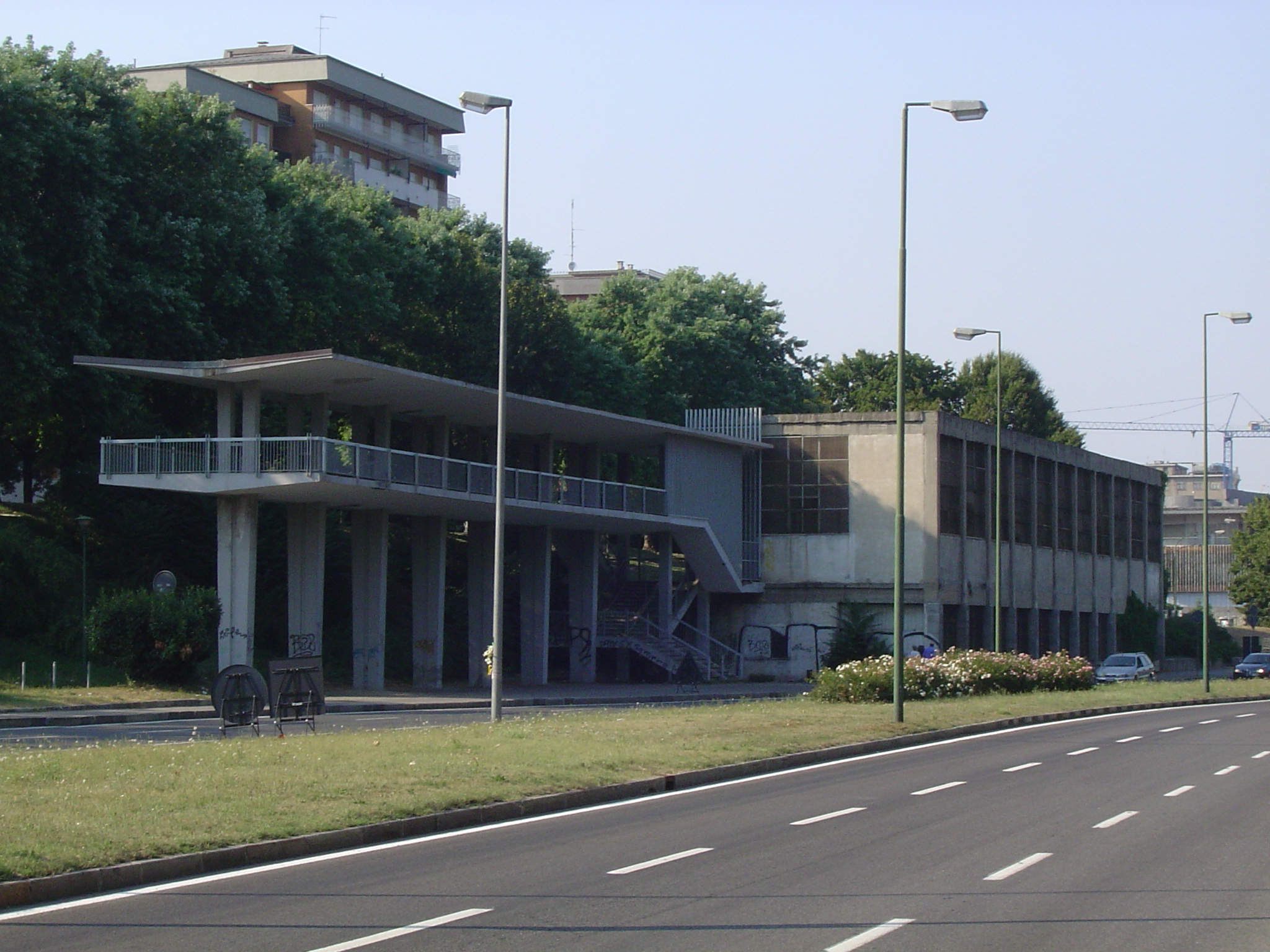
The northerly monorail station

== See also ==
- Prima Esposizione Internazionale d'Arte Decorativa Moderna (1902)
- Turin International (1911)
- The International Expo of Sport (1955)
- Italia '61-Regione Piemonte (Turin Metro)
- List of world's fairs
