= Román Montañez =

Spanish basketball player

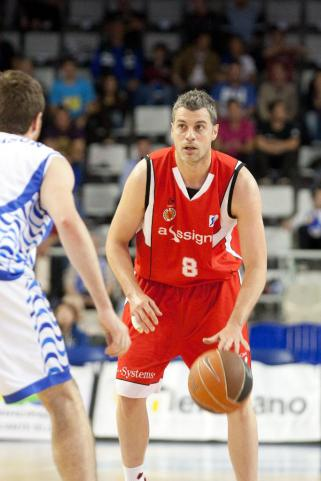
- Montañez playing for Manresa

Personal information
- Born: February 18, 1979 (age 47) Sant Joan de Vilatorrada, Spain
- Listed height: 1.93 m (6 ft 4 in)

Career information
- Playing career: 1995–2017
- Position: Shooting guard
- Number: 8

Career history
- 1995–1997: Bàsquet Manresa B
- 1997–1998: Lleida Bàsquet
- 1998–2000: Bàsquet Manresa
- 2000–2005: Valladolid
- 2005–2007: Bilbao Basket
- 2007–2008: Girona
- 2008–2012: Bàsquet Manresa
- 2012: Andorra
- 2012–2013: Valladolid
- 2013–2014: Fuenlabrada
- 2014–2015: Valladolid
- 2015–2017: Bàsquet Manresa

Román Montañez is a Spanish former professional basketball player. Playing for several Liga ACB clubs during his career, Montañez played for Bàsquet Manresa during several separate spells, helping the Catalans win their first and only championship in the 1997-98 ACB season. Montañez retired from professional basketball in 2017, acting as team captain in his last seasons with Manresa. After his playing career ended, Montañez continued at Manresa, acting as the team's general manager between 2017 and 2020.

== Trophies ==
=== With Bàsquet Manresa ===
- Liga ACB: (1)
  - 1998

=== With CB Girona ===
- FIBA Eurocup: (1)
  - 2007
