= 2007–08 ULEB Cup =

- League: ULEB Cup
- Sport: Men's basketball
- Top scorer: (Austria) De'Teri Mayes (Allianz Swans Gmunden)

Finals
- Champions: (Spain) DKV Joventut (1st title)
- Runners-up: (Spain) Akasvayu Girona
- Finals MVP: (Spain) Rudy Fernández

ULEB Cup seasons
- ← 2006–07 2008–09 →

The 2007–08 ULEB Cup was the sixth season of the second-tier level European professional club basketball competition, the EuroCup, which is organized by Euroleague Basketball S.L. It was also the last season for the competition under the name of ULEB Cup. The EuroCup is the European-wide league level that is one tier below the EuroLeague level. On July 2, 2008, EuroLeague Basketball S.L. and FIBA Europe announced that the competition would be renamed to the Eurocup, starting with the 2008–09 season.

For the first time, 54 teams competed. The Final Eight was held from April 10, to April 13, in Turin, Italy, in the Palavela arena. The trophy was won by the Spanish club DKV Joventut, with the other finalist being another Spanish team, Akasvayu Girona. Dynamo Moscow took third place.

== Teams of the 2007–08 ULEB Cup ==
Country	Teams	Clubs (ranking in national league)				
France	5	Nancy (2nd)	ASVEL (3rd)	Élan Chalon (4th)	Strasbourg (5th)	Pau-Orthez (9th)
Germany	5	Artland Dragons (2nd)	EnBW Ludwigsburg (3rd)	Köln 99ers (4th)	Alba Berlin (5th)	Deutsche Bank Skyliners (13th)
Russia	4	UNICS (2nd)	Khimki (3rd)	Dynamo Moscow (4th)	Triumph Lyubertsy (6th)	
Spain	4	DKV Joventut (4th)	Akasvayu Girona (5th)	Kalise Gran Canaria (6th)	Pamesa Valencia (7th)	
Belgium	3	Telindus Oostende (1st)	Spirou (3rd)	Antwerp Giants (4th)		
Poland	3	Turów Zgorzelec (2nd)	ASCO Śląsk Wrocław (3rd)	Anwil Włocławek (4th)		
Serbia	3	Crvena zvezda (2nd)	Hemofarm (3rd)	FMP (4th)		
Turkey	3	Türk Telekom (3rd)	Galatasaray Café Crown (4th)	Beşiktaş Cola Turka (5th)		
Greece	2	Panionios Forthnet (4th)	Panellinios (5th)			
Israel	2	Hapoel Jerusalem (2nd)	Hapoel Galil Elyon (4th)			
Italy	2	Benetton Treviso (11th)	Beghelli Fortitudo Bologna (13th)			
Latvia	2	ASK Riga (1st)	Ventspils (2nd)			
Netherlands	2	EiffelTowers EBBC (1st)	Hanzevast Capitals (5th)			
Ukraine	2	Azovmash (1st)	Kyiv (2nd)			
Austria	1	Allianz Swans Gmunden (1st)				
(Bosnia and Herzegovina) Bosnia & Herzegovina	1	Bosna (2nd)				
Bulgaria	1	Lukoil Academic (1st)				
Croatia	1	Zadar (2nd)				
Czech Republic	1	ČEZ Nymburk (1st)				
Estonia	1	Kalev/Cramo (2nd)				
Lithuania	1	Šiauliai (3rd)				
Montenegro	1	Budućnost (1st)				
Portugal	1	Ovarense Aerosoles (1st)				
Romania	1	Asesoft Ploiești (1st)				
Switzerland	1	Benetton Fribourg (1st)				
United Kingdom	1	Guildford Heat (3rd)				

=== Teams details ===
Team	Location	Arena
ASVEL	Villeurbanne, France	L'Astroballe
Akasvayu Girona	Girona, Spain	Palau Girona-Fontajau
Alba Berlin	Berlin, Germany	Max-Schmeling-Halle
Antwerp Giants	Antwerp, Belgium	Lotto Arena
Anwil Włocławek	Włocławek, Poland	Hala Mistrzow
Artland Dragons	Quakenbrück, Germany	Artland Arena
ASCO Śląsk Wrocław	Wrocław, Poland	Hala Orbita
ASK Riga	Riga, Latvia	Arena Riga
Azovmash	Mariupol, Ukraine	Azovmash Arena
Kalev/Cramo	Tallinn, Estonia	Saku Suurhall
Kyiv	Kyiv, Ukraine	Palace of Sports
Benetton Fribourg	Fribourg, Switzerland	Sainte-Croix
Benetton Treviso	Treviso, Italy	Palaverde
Beşiktaş	Istanbul, Turkey	BJK Akatlar Arena
Ventspils	Ventspils, Latvia	Ventspils Nafta Hall
ČEZ Nymburk	Nymburk, Czech Republic	ČEZ Arena
Asesoft	Ploieşti, Romania	Sala Sporturilor Olimpia
Deutsche Bank Skyliners	Frankfurt, Germany	Ballsporthalle
DKV Joventut	Badalona, Spain	Pavelló Olímpic de Badalona
Dynamo Moscow	Moscow, Russia	Krylatskoe Sport Palace
EiffelTowers Den Bosch	Den Bosch, Netherlands	Maaspoort Sports end Events
Élan Chalon	Chalon-sur-Saône, France	Le Colisée
Beghelli Fortitudo Bologna	Bologna, Italy	PalaDozza
Kalise Gran Canaria	Las Palmas, Spain	Centro Insular
Galatasaray Café Crown	Istanbul, Turkey	Ayhan Şahenk Spor Salonu
Guildford Heat	Guildford, United Kingdom	The Spectrum
Hanzevast Capitals	Groningen, Netherlands	Martini Plaza
Hapoel Galil Elyon	Kfar Blum, Israel	Heichal ha Pais
Hapoel Jerusalem	Jerusalem, Israel	Malha Arena
Khimki	Khimki, Russia	Novator Palace of Sports
Bosna	Sarajevo, Bosnia and Herzegovina	Mirza Delibašić Arena
Budućnost	Podgorica, Montenegro	Morača Sports Center
FMP	Belgrade, Serbia	Železnik Hall
Hemofarm	Vršac, Serbia	Millennium Center
Köln 99ers	Cologne, Germany	GEW Energy Dome
Ludwigsburg	Ludwigsburg, Germany	Rundsporthalle
Lukoil Academic	Sofia, Bulgaria	Universiada Hall
Ovarense	Ovar, Portugal	Arena Dolce Vita
Pamesa Valencia	Valencia, Spain	Fuente San Luis
Panellinios	Kypseli, Greece	Panellinios Indoor Hall
Panionios Forthnet	Athens, Greece	Helliniko Indoor Arena
Pau-Orthez	Pau, France	Palais des Sports
Turów Zgorzelec	Zgorzelec, Poland	Centrum Sportowe
Crvena Zvezda	Belgrade, Serbia	Pionir Hall
Šiauliai	Šiauliai, Lithuania	Šiaulių Arena
Nancy	Nancy, France	Jean Weille Palais
Spirou Charleroi	Charleroi, Belgium	SpirouDome
Strasbourg	Strasbourg, France	Rhénus Sport
Allianz Swans Gmunden	Gmunden, Austria	Volksbank-Arena
Telindus Oostende	Ostend, Belgium	Sleuyter Arena
Triumph Lyubertsy	Lyubertsy, Russia	SH Triumph
Türk Telekom	Ankara, Turkey	Ankara Sport Hall
UNICS	Kazan, Russia	Basket Hall Arena
Zadar	Zadar, Croatia	Jazine Basketball Hall

== Format ==
For the first time in its short history, this season's ULEB Cup featured a total of 54 teams, divided into 9 groups of 6 teams. The round-robin group stage was followed by knock-out stages, until the last 8 remaining teams met in the competition's first ever Final Eight tournament. Just as in the previous season, the official broadcast partner of the ULEB Cup was Eurosport. The regular season began in November 2007.

=== Regular season ===
All 54 teams in 9 groups (in each group 6 teams) played a round-robin competition (home and away). 3 teams from each group advanced to the Knockout stage (Sixteenth-finals). The 5 teams with the best results advanced, as did the fourth place in the group also advanced to the Playoff.

=== Top 32 ===
A draw was held to determine the eighth-finals match-ups. Each round was played as two games (home and away) to advance to the next stage. The winners were determined by points difference. Draws in the first games were possible. Example: UNICS 86, Real 80, first game. Real 99, UNICS 80, second game. Points difference, UNICS 166-179, Real win.

=== Top 16 ===
The winners from the Sixteen-finals advanced to the eighth finals. The games were played as two games (home and away). The winners were determined by points difference.

=== Final eight ===
The winners of the eighth finals played the Final Eight. It was held from April 10 to April 13.

== Regular season ==
Key to colors
Top three places in each group, plus highest-ranked fourth-place team, advance to Top 32

=== Group A ===
	Team	Pld	W	L	PF	PA	Diff
1.	(Spain) DKV Joventut	10	9	1	913	675	238
2.	(Turkey) Türk Telekom	10	9	1	920	831	89
3.	(Bosnia and Herzegovina) Bosna	10	4	6	860	880	-20
4.	(Lithuania) Šiauliai	10	4	6	781	826	-45
5.	(Germany) Alba Berlin	10	4	6	790	815	-25
6.	(England) Guildford Heat	10	0	10	689	926	-237

=== Group B ===
	Team	Pld	W	L	PF	PA	Diff
1.	(Turkey) Beşiktaş Cola Turka	10	10	0	823	704	119
2.	(Latvia) Ventspils	10	6	4	829	765	64
3.	(Germany) Köln 99ers	10	6	4	792	808	-16
4.	(France) Élan Chalon	10	5	5	807	795	12
5.	(Serbia) FMP	10	3	7	752	779	-27
6.	(Portugal) Ovarense Aerosoles	10	0	10	760	912	-152

=== Group C ===
	Team	Pld	W	L	PF	PA	Diff
1.	(Spain) Akasvayu Girona	10	7	3	846	747	99
2.	(Turkey) Galatasaray Café Crown	10	7	3	805	725	80
3.	(Serbia) Hemofarm	10	6	4	822	813	9
4.	(Romania) Asesoft Ploiești	10	4	6	758	763	-5
5.	(Belgium) Spirou	10	4	6	718	747	-29
6.	(Netherlands) Hanzevast Capitals	10	2	8	761	915	-154

=== Group D ===
	Team	Pld	W	L	PF	PA	Diff
1.	(Spain) Pamesa Valencia	10	8	2	798	730	68
2.	(Russia) Khimki	10	8	2	849	790	59
3.	(Ukraine) Azovmash	10	6	4	791	796	-5
4.	(France) Nancy	10	4	6	796	794	2
5.	(Poland) Anwil Włocławek	10	4	6	751	783	-32
6.	(Germany) Deutsche Bank Skyliners	10	0	10	700	792	-92

=== Group E ===
	Team	Pld	W	L	PF	PA	Diff
1.	(Russia) Triumph Lyubertsy	10	8	2	792	686	106
2.	(Montenegro) Budućnost	10	7	3	781	709	72
3.	(Austria) Allianz Swans Gmunden	10	5	5	748	763	-15
4.	(Belgium) Antwerp Giants	10	4	6	754	791	-37
5.	(Israel) Hapoel Galil Elyon	10	3	7	784	839	-55
6.	(Switzerland) Benetton Fribourg	10	3	7	737	808	-71

=== Group F ===
	Team	Pld	W	L	PF	PA	Diff
1.	(Russia) Dynamo Moscow	10	8	2	913	809	104
2.	(Belgium) Telindus Oostende	10	6	4	814	799	15
3.	(Serbia) Crvena zvezda	10	6	4	839	848	-9
4.	(Czech Republic) ČEZ Nymburk	10	5	5	825	802	23
5.	(Italy) Beghelli Fortitudo Bologna	10	4	6	745	759	-14
6.	(Greece) Panellinios	10	1	9	722	841	-119

=== Group G ===
	Team	Pld	W	L	PF	PA	Diff
1.	(Spain) Kalise Gran Canaria	10	8	2	820	752	68
2.	(France) ASVEL	10	6	4	864	809	55
3.	(Greece) Panionios Forthnet	10	5	5	822	818	4
4.	(Poland) ASCO Śląsk Wrocław	10	5	5	785	760	25
5.	(Germany) EnBW Ludwigsburg	10	3	7	811	852	-41
6.	(Estonia) Kalev/Cramo	10	3	7	727	838	-111

=== Group H ===
	Team	Pld	W	L	PF	PA	Diff
1.	(Italy) Benetton Treviso	10	7	3	833	762	71
2.	(Ukraine) Kyiv	10	7	3	802	735	67
3.	(Bulgaria) Lukoil Academic	10	6	4	886	811	75
4.	(Germany) Artland Dragons	10	5	5	723	793	-70
5.	(Latvia) ASK Riga	10	3	7	723	728	-5
6.	(France) Pau-Orthez	10	2	8	692	830	-138

=== Group I ===
	Team	Pld	W	L	PF	PA	Diff
1.	(Poland) Turów Zgorzelec	10	8	2	743	695	48
2.	(Croatia) Zadar	10	6	4	850	761	89
3.	(Russia) UNICS	10	5	5	799	732	67
4.	(Israel) Hapoel Jerusalem	10	5	5	820	856	-36
5.	(Netherlands) EiffelTowers EBBC	10	3	7	788	863	-75
6.	(France) Strasbourg	10	3	7	688	781	-93

== Top 32 ==
The draw to determine a bracket for the elimination rounds of the 2007–08 ULEB Cup was held on Monday, January 28, 2008, at 13:30 CET in the Museu Olimpic i de l'Esport in Barcelona.

Team 1	Agg.	Team 2	1st leg	2nd leg
ASCO Śląsk Wrocław (Poland)	161–177	(Russia) Dynamo Moscow	78–85	83–92
Lukoil Academic (Bulgaria)	140–119	(Latvia) Ventspils	67–64	73–55
Telindus Oostende (Belgium)	121–133	(Ukraine) Kyiv	61–65	60–68
ČEZ Nymburk (Czech Republic)	127–129	(Poland) Turów Zgorzelec	61–61	66–68
Élan Chalon (France)	150–163	(Spain) Akasvayu Girona	93–85	57–78
Hemofarm (Serbia)	155–134	(Montenegro) Budućnost	82–56	73–78
UNICS (Russia)	184–161	(Turkey) Türk Telekom	91–65	93–96
Artland Dragons (Germany)	161–157	(Russia) Triumph Lyubertsy	81–75	80–82
Allianz Swans Gmunden (Austria)	115–166	(Spain) DKV Joventut	59–89	56–77
Köln 99ers (Germany)	141–187	(Russia) Khimki	72–91	69–96
Azovmash (Ukraine)	142–157	(Croatia) Zadar	82–80	60–77
Panionios Forthnet (Greece)	131–141	(Spain) Pamesa Valencia	70–59	61–82
Hapoel Jerusalem (Israel)	141–146	(Turkey) Beşiktaş Cola Turka	88–73	53–73
Crvena zvezda (Serbia)	164–153	(Italy) Benetton Treviso	81–71	83–82
ASVEL (France)	144–145	(Turkey) Galatasaray Café Crown	69–69	75–76
Bosna (Bosnia and Herzegovina)	158–171	(Spain) Kalise Gran Canaria	89–82	69–89

== Top 16 ==
Team 1	Agg.	Team 2	1st leg	2nd leg
Lukoil Academic (Bulgaria)	152–192	(Russia) Dynamo Moscow	75–89	77–103
Kyiv (Ukraine)	126–129	(Poland) Turów Zgorzelec	59–71	67–58
Hemofarm (Serbia)	133–156	(Spain) Akasvayu Girona	71–80	62–76
Artland Dragons (Germany)	139–152	(Russia) UNICS	80–78	59–74
Khimki (Russia)	127–165	(Spain) DKV Joventut	73–96	54–69
Zadar (Croatia)	144–162	(Spain) Pamesa Valencia	74–69	70–93
Crvena zvezda (Serbia)	149–161	(Turkey) Beşiktaş Cola Turka	80–80	69–81
Galatasaray Café Crown (Turkey)	178–162	(Spain) Kalise Gran Canaria	99–74	79–88

== Final eight ==
=== Quarter finals ===
April 10, Palavela, Turin

Team 1	Score	Team 2
DKV Joventut (Spain)	77–67	(Spain) Pamesa Valencia
Beşiktaş Cola Turka (Turkey)	60–61	(Turkey) Galatasaray Café Crown

April 11, Palavela, Turin

Team 1	Score	Team 2
Dynamo Moscow (Russia)	78–63	(Poland) Turów Zgorzelec
Akasvayu Girona (Spain)	75–66	(Russia) UNICS

=== Semi finals ===
April 12, Palavela, Turin

Team 1	Score	Team 2
Dynamo Moscow (Russia)	78–81	(Spain) Akasvayu Girona
DKV Joventut (Spain)	90–83	(Turkey) Galatasaray Café Crown

=== 3rd place game ===
April 13, Palavela, Turin

Team 1	Score	Team 2
Dynamo Moscow (Russia)	84–67	(Turkey) Galatasaray Café Crown

=== Final ===
April 13, Palavela, Turin

Team 1	Score	Team 2
DKV Joventut (Spain)	79–54	(Spain) Akasvayu Girona

2007–08 ULEB Cup Champions

DKV Joventut
1st title

== Finals MVP ==
- (Spain) Rudy Fernández (DKV Joventut)
