= Torino Palavela =

Indoor arena in Turin, Italy

PalaVela
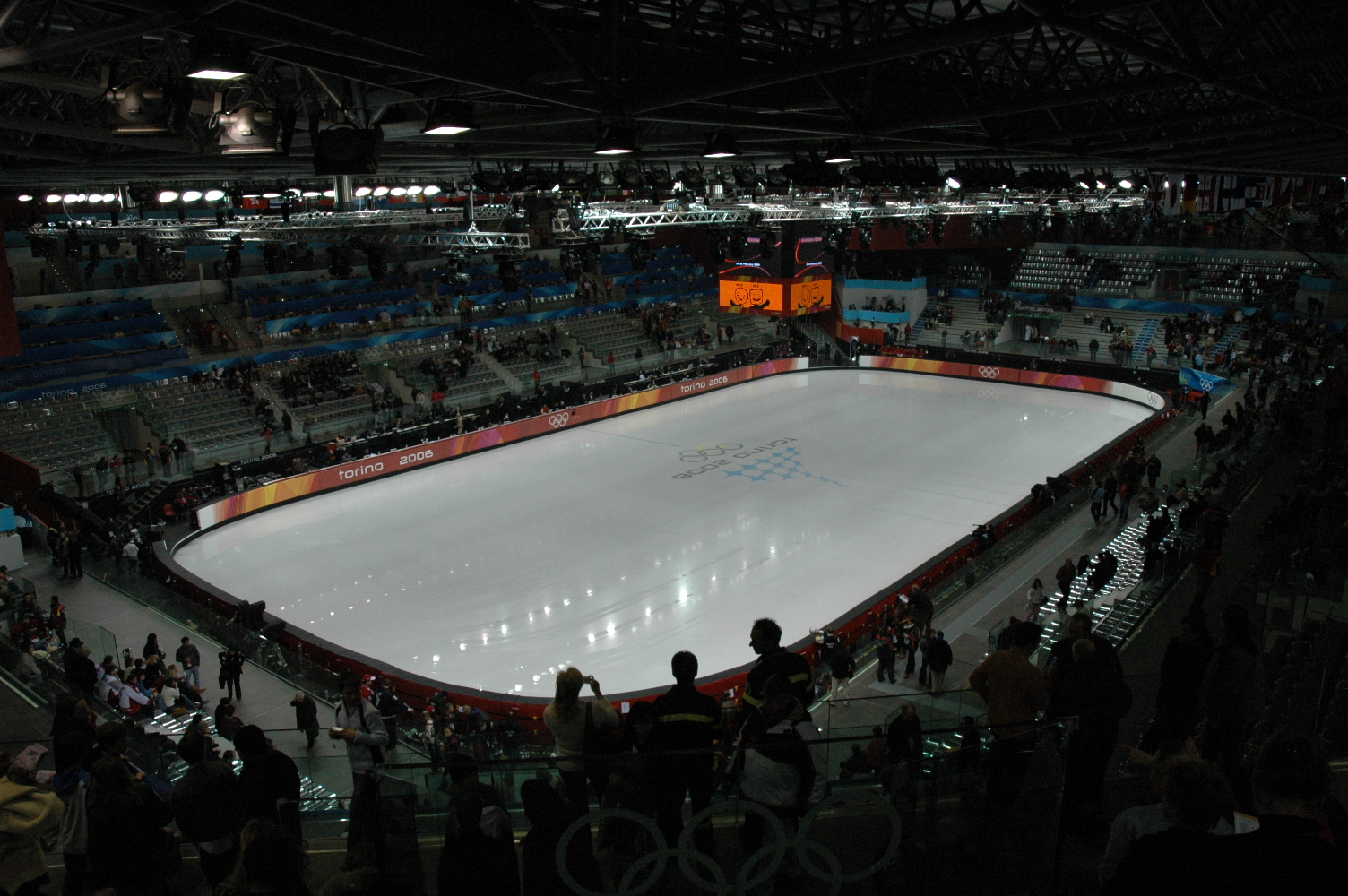
- Palavela during the 2006 Winter Olympics
- Interactive map of PalaVela
- Former names: Palazzo delle Mostre; Palazzo a vela
- Location: Via Ventimiglia, 145, 10127 Turin, Italy
- Coordinates: 45°01′24″N 7°40′09″E
- Owner: City of Turin
- Capacity: Basketball: 9,200; Figure skating and Short track: 8,285

Construction
- Built: 1959–1961
- Opened: 1961
- Renovated: October 2003 – December 2004, 2018
- Cost: 110 Million lire
- Architects: Annibale and Giorgio Rigotti; Gae Aulenti (renovation)
- Structural engineer: Franco Levi

Website
- http://www.palavelatorino.it/

Palavela, formerly known as Palazzo delle Mostre and Palazzo a Vela is an indoor arena that is located in Turin, Italy, on the bank of the River Po. It was designed by engineer Franco Levi and architects Annibale and Giorgio Rigotti. The arena is 130 metres in diameter. It has a seating capacity for a maximum 12,200 people, and 9,200 when configured for basketball games.

The Palavela was featured in the 1969 film The Italian Job. In a famous scene in the film, three Minis are seen driving onto and over the arena's distinctive roof.

== History ==
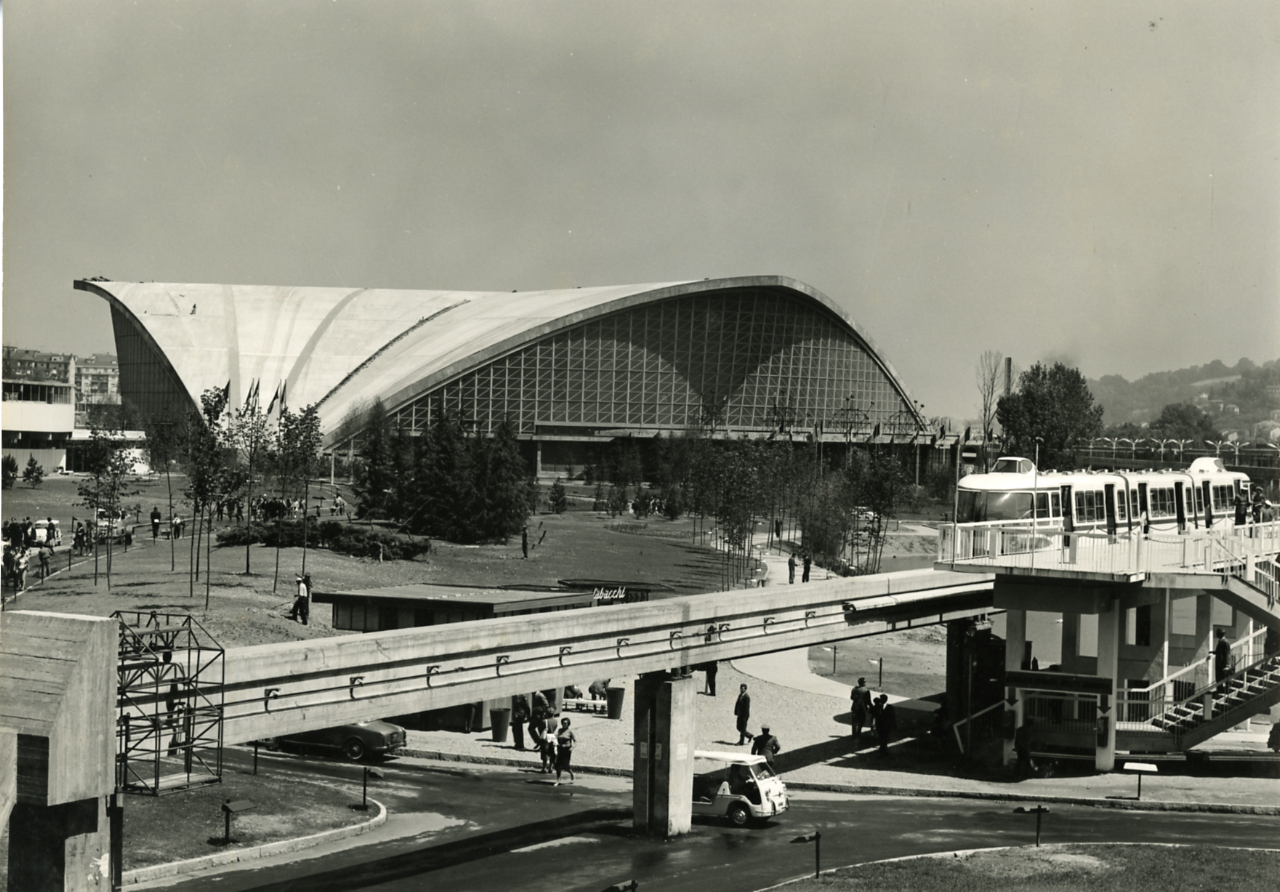
Panoramic view of Expo 61 with Palazzo a Vela, photographed by Paolo Monti in 1961.

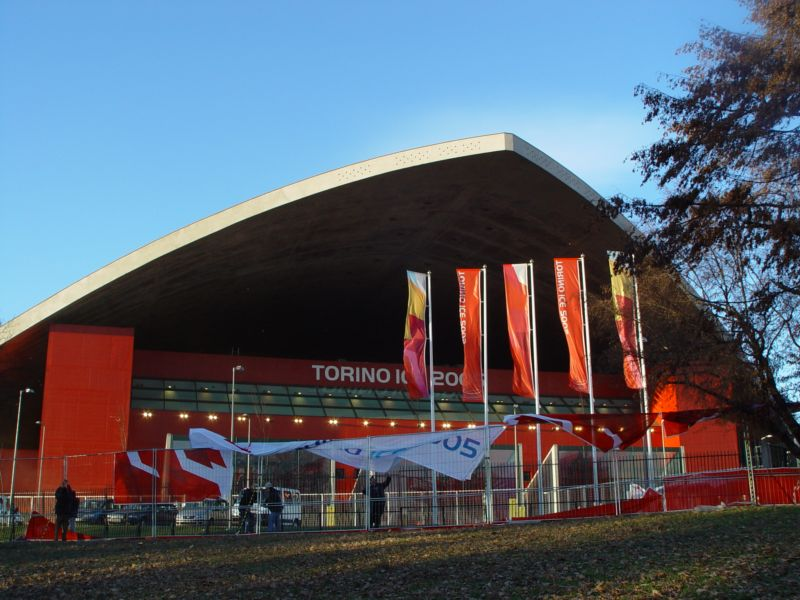
Front entrance during the 2006 Winter Olympics test events

Palavela was originally built for the Italia '61 Expo, and was renovated for the figure skating and short track speed skating events at the 2006 Winter Olympics. As part of the renovation, a new seating and scoring systems were installed at the arena. The cost of the renovation was €55,000,000.

It also hosted the same events during the 2007 Winter Universiade. In 2008, the Palavela hosted the 24th European Rhythmic Gymnastics. It hosted the 2010 World Figure Skating Championships in March 2010.

The arena also hosted the 2008 ULEB Cup Final Eight, and also the same event, under the competition's new name of EuroCup, in the 2008–09 season.

== Events held ==
- 2005 European Short Track Speed Skating Championships
- 2005 European Figure Skating Championships
- 2006 Winter Olympics (Short Track Speed Skating and Figure Skating)
- 2007 Winter Universiade (Short Track Speed Skating and Figure Skating)
- 2007–08 ISU Short Track Speed Skating World Cup
- 2007–2008 Grand Prix of Figure Skating Final
- 2008 ULEB Cup Final Eight
- 2008 Rhythmic Gymnastics European Championships
- 2010 World Figure Skating Championships
- 2013 Davis Cup(World Group First Round)
- 2015 Men's European Volleyball Championship(Pool B)
- 2017 European Short Track Speed Skating Championships
- 2019 Grand Prix Figure Skating Final
- 2022 Grand Prix Figure Skating Final
- 2025 Winter Universiade (Short Track Speed Skating and Figure Skating)

== See also ==
- List of indoor arenas in Italy
