= Tomas Nagys =

Lithuanian basketball player (born 1980)

Tomas Nagys (born March 5, 1980) is a Lithuanian former basketball player.Born in Mažeikiai, Nagys is 6 ft 10 inches (2m 10 cm) height, 270 lbs (125 kg) weight.
