= Marc Gasol =

Spanish basketball player (born 1985)

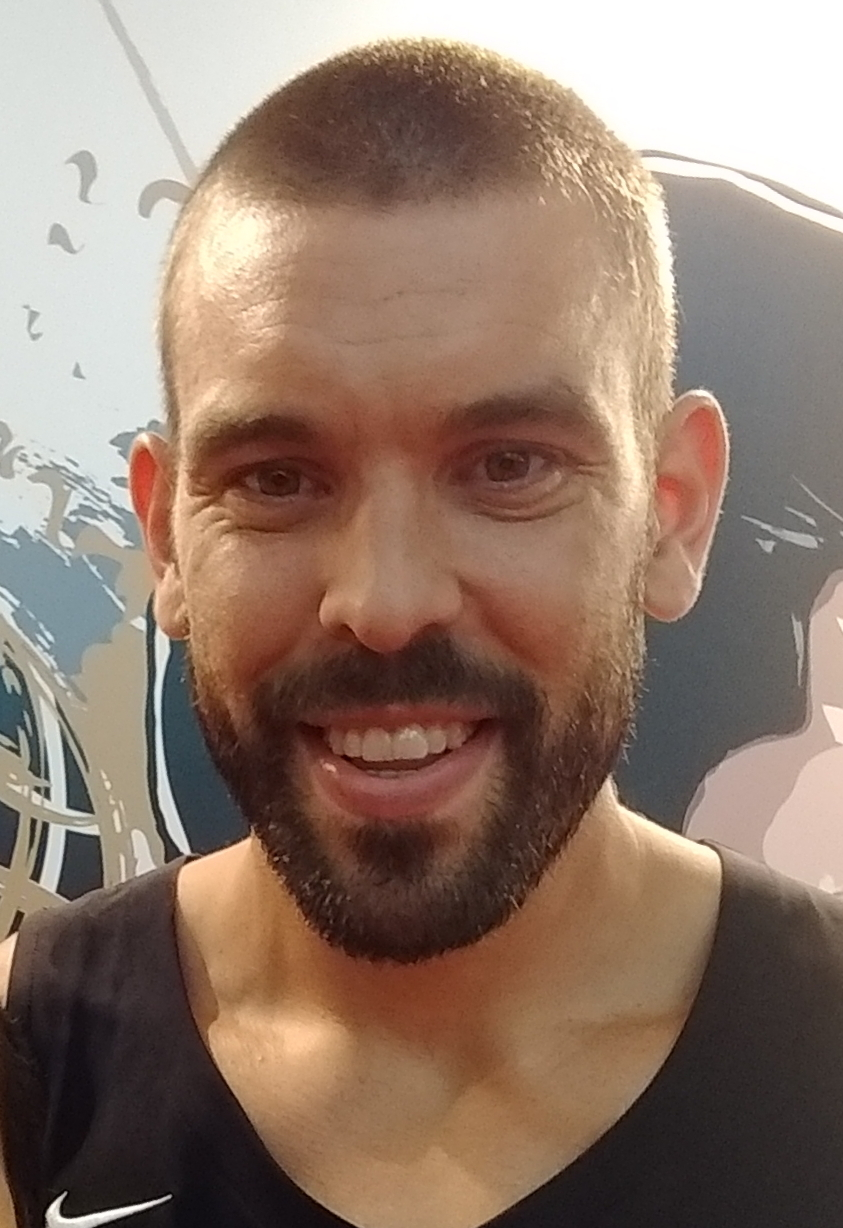
- Gasol in 2018

Bàsquet Girona
- Title: President
- League: Liga ACB

Personal information
- Born: 29 January 1985 (age 41) Barcelona, Catalonia, Spain
- Listed height: 6 ft 11 in (2.11 m)
- Listed weight: 255 lb (116 kg)

Career information
- High school: Lausanne Collegiate (Memphis, Tennessee)
- NBA draft: 2007: 2nd round, 48th overall pick
- Drafted by: Los Angeles Lakers
- Playing career: 2003–2023
- Position: Center
- Number: 13, 14, 33

Career history
- 2003–2006: FC Barcelona
- 2006–2008: CB Girona
- 2008–2019: Memphis Grizzlies
- 2019–2020: Toronto Raptors
- 2020–2021: Los Angeles Lakers
- 2021–2023: Bàsquet Girona

Career highlights
- NBA champion (2019); 3× NBA All-Star (2012, 2015, 2017); All-NBA First Team (2015); All-NBA Second Team (2013); NBA Defensive Player of the Year (2013); NBA All-Defensive Second Team (2013); NBA All-Rookie Second Team (2009); No. 33 retired by Memphis Grizzlies; Liga ACB champion (2004); FIBA EuroCup winner (2007); ACB Most Valuable Player Award (2008); All-ACB Team (2008); LEB Oro Final Four MVP (2022); Euroscar Player of the Year (2014); Division II A Tennessee Mr. Basketball (2003)

Career NBA statistics
- Points: 12,514 (14.0 ppg)
- Rebounds: 6,604 (7.4 rpg)
- Assists: 2,996 (3.4 apg)
- Stats at NBA.com
- Stats at Basketball Reference
Medals
Men's basketball
Representing Spain
Olympic Games
Silver medal – second place	2008 Beijing	Team
Silver medal – second place	2012 London	Team
World Cup
Gold medal – first place	2006 Japan	Team
Gold medal – first place	2019 China	Team
FIBA Eurobasket
Gold medal – first place	2009 Poland	Team
Gold medal – first place	2011 Lithuania	Team
Silver medal – second place	2007 Spain	Team
Bronze medal – third place	2013 Slovenia	Team
Bronze medal – third place	2017 Finland–Israel–Romania–Turkey	Team

Marc Gasol Sáez (Catalan: [ˈmaɾɡ ɡəˈzɔl], Spanish: [ˈmaɾk gaˈsol]; born 29 January 1985) is a Spanish former professional basketball player who is the president of Bàsquet Girona of the Liga ACB. The center is a two-time All-NBA Team member and a three-time NBA All-Star. He was named the NBA Defensive Player of the Year with the Memphis Grizzlies in 2013, and won an NBA championship with the Toronto Raptors in 2019.

Gasol was drafted 48th overall by the Los Angeles Lakers in the 2007 NBA draft. After having his rights traded to Memphis in February 2008 in a deal that sent his older brother Pau Gasol to the Lakers, he signed with the Grizzlies and remained with the franchise until being traded to Toronto in 2019. He rejoined the Lakers in 2020 for one season.

Gasol has been a regular member of the Spain national team since 2006. He has won two Olympic silver medals and two FIBA Basketball World Cup titles. In the EuroBasket, he has won two titles, a silver medal, and two bronze medals.

== Early life ==
Gasol was born and raised in Barcelona, Spain. In 2001, he moved as a teenager with his parents to the Memphis suburb of Germantown, Tennessee, after his older brother Pau joined the Memphis Grizzlies. Gasol played high school basketball at Lausanne Collegiate School in Memphis. Nicknamed "The Big Burrito," he was named Division 2's Mr. Basketball in 2003 following a senior season in which he averaged 26 points, 13 rebounds, and six blocks per game. In 2008, Lausanne retired Gasol's number 33 jersey.

== Professional career ==
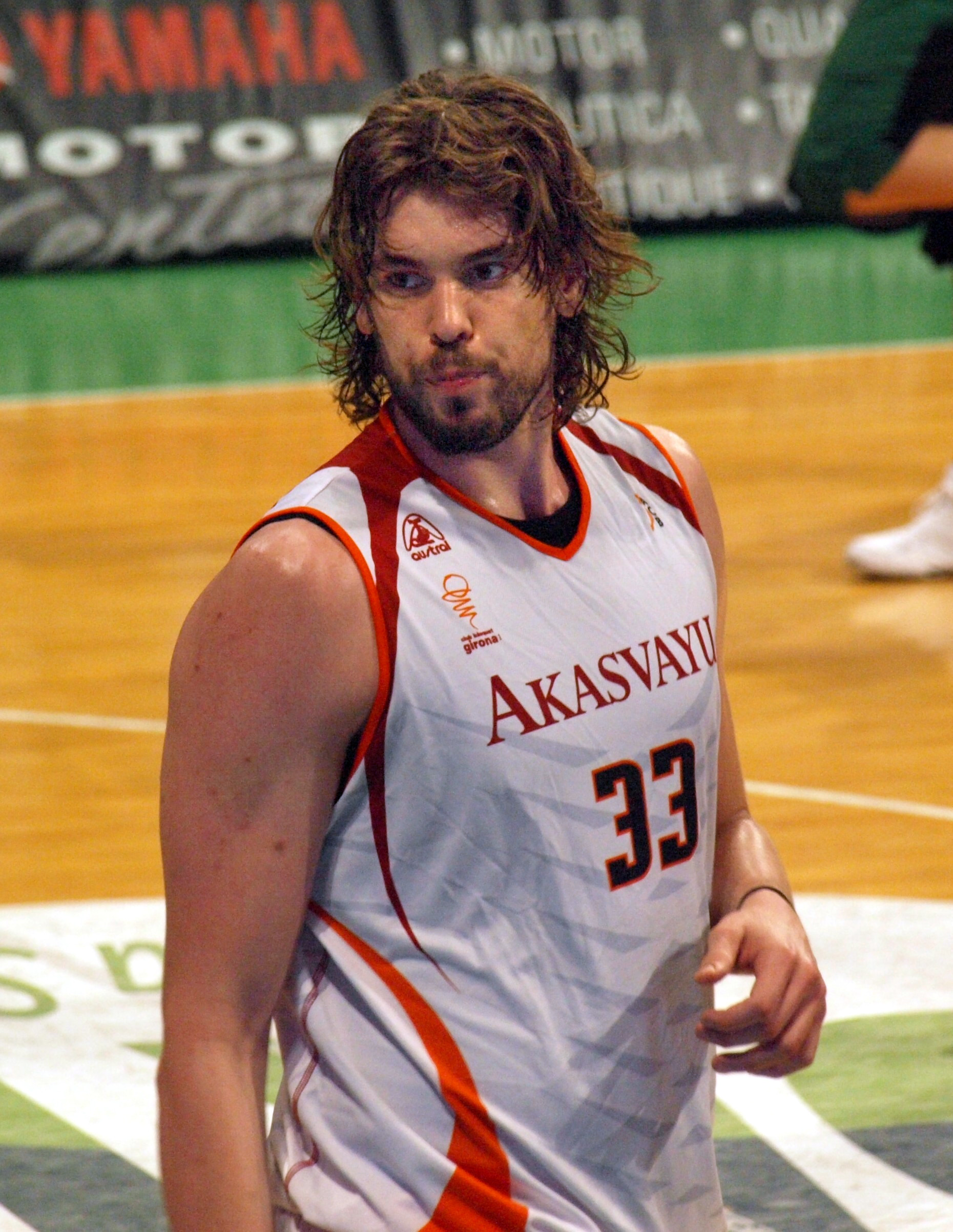
Gasol with Girona in May 2008

=== FC Barcelona (2003–2006) ===
After graduating from Lausanne, Gasol returned to his home country of Spain to play in the Liga ACB for FC Barcelona.

=== CB Girona (2006–2008) ===
After three seasons with Barcelona, Gasol signed with Girona in 2006. In 2008, he was named the ACB Most Valuable Player.

=== Memphis Grizzlies (2008–2019) ===
==== Early years ====
Gasol was selected by the Los Angeles Lakers with the 48th overall pick in the 2007 NBA draft. On February 1, 2008, his draft rights were traded by the Lakers to the Memphis Grizzlies as part of a trade package that included his older brother, Pau, who was sent from the Grizzlies to the Lakers. On July 9, 2008, he signed with the Grizzlies. He set a franchise rookie record for field goal percentage in a season with 53 percent. The previous record was held by Pau with 51.8 percent in 2001–02. He subsequently earned NBA All-Rookie Second Team honors. After averaging 11.9 points and 7.4 rebounds as a rookie, he averaged 14.6 points and 9.3 rebounds in 2009–10 with a career-best .581 field goal percentage.

The 2010–11 season saw Gasol average 11.7 points, 7.0 rebounds, a career-high 2.5 assists and 1.68 blocks in 81 games (all starts). He then posted 15.0 points, 11.2 rebounds, 2.2 assists, and 2.15 blocks in helping lead the Grizzlies through a 13-game run in the 2011 NBA Playoffs. Memphis, which had never even won a playoff game before 2011, defeated the Western Conference's top-seeded San Antonio Spurs in the opening round, then went to a deciding seventh game against the Oklahoma City Thunder. Gasol led the Grizzlies in field goal accuracy and blocked shots in each of his first three NBA seasons.

==== 2011–12 season: First All-Star selection ====
On December 14, 2011, Gasol re-signed with the Grizzlies to a four-year, $58 million contract. On January 23, 2012, he was named Western Conference Player of the Week for games played January 16–22. On February 9, 2012, he was named an NBA All-Star for the first time, earning a place on the Western Conference roster as a reserve for the 2012 NBA All-Star Game.

==== 2012–13 season: Defensive Player of the Year ====
In 2012–13, Gasol was one of only six players to average at least 1.5 blocks (1.7 bpg) and 1.0 steals (1.0 spg). He led a Grizzlies defense that allowed a league-low 88.7 points per game during the regular season. His +5.4 score differential ranked second among NBA centers; additionally, Memphis enjoyed a +7.5 score differential when Gasol was on the court compared with -3.9 when he was on the bench. In April 2013, he was named the NBA Defensive Player of the Year, becoming the first player in Grizzlies history to earn the honour, the first Spanish man to win, and the first European to win. ESPN lauded the Grizzlies' ability to force turnovers with Gasol on the court anchoring the defense. He was also named to the All-NBA Second Team. Despite winning Defensive Player of the Year, Gasol was named to the NBA All-Defensive Second Team due to a different voting system.

==== 2013–14 season: MCL injury ====
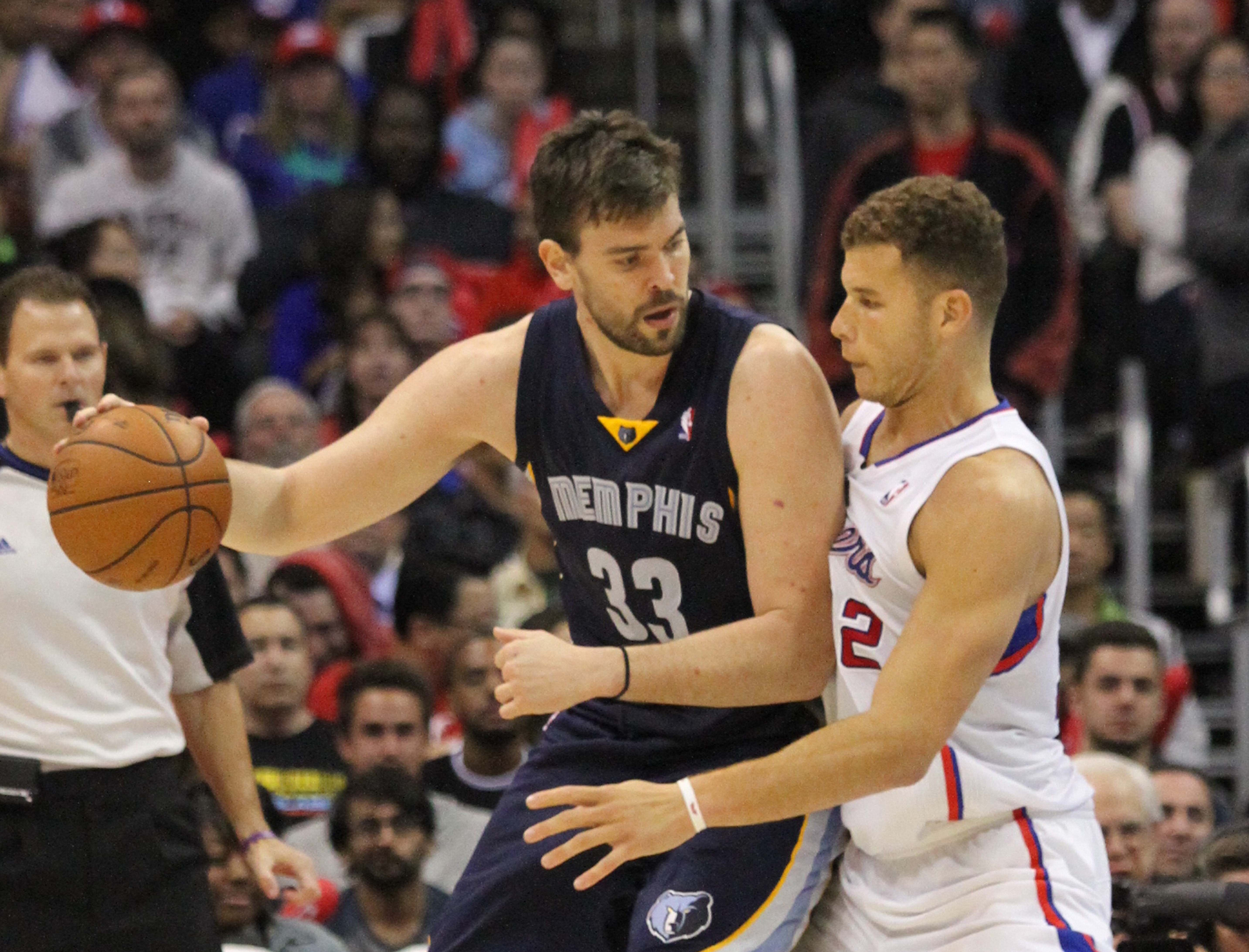
Gasol in November 2013, backing down Blake Griffin

In 2013–14, Gasol played a career-low 59 games. A left MCL sprain suffered on November 22 against the San Antonio Spurs sidelined him for 23 games from November 25 to January 12.

==== 2014–15 season: All-NBA First Team selection ====
The 2014–15 season saw Gasol earn his second NBA All-Star selection, earning his first All-Star start, and was named to the All-NBA First Team for the first time. He averaged a career-best 17.4 points to go with 7.8 rebounds and 3.8 assists for the 55-win Grizzlies. He scored 30-plus points five times after doing so just once in his first six seasons. He set career-highs in field goals made and attempted, as well as free throws made and attempted. He was the only player in the league with at least 1,300 points, 600 rebounds, and 300 assists.

==== 2015–16 season: Contract extension ====
On July 13, 2015, Gasol re-signed with the Grizzlies on a five-year maximum contract worth an estimated $110 million. On November 20, he recorded his first career triple-double with 16 points, 11 rebounds, and 11 assists in a 96–84 win over the Houston Rockets, marking the first triple-double for Memphis since 2007 when his brother Pau recorded 17 points, 13 rebounds, and 12 assists. Gasol set a new career low for games played with 52 after missing the second half of the season with a broken right foot.

==== 2016–17 season: Career high in scoring ====
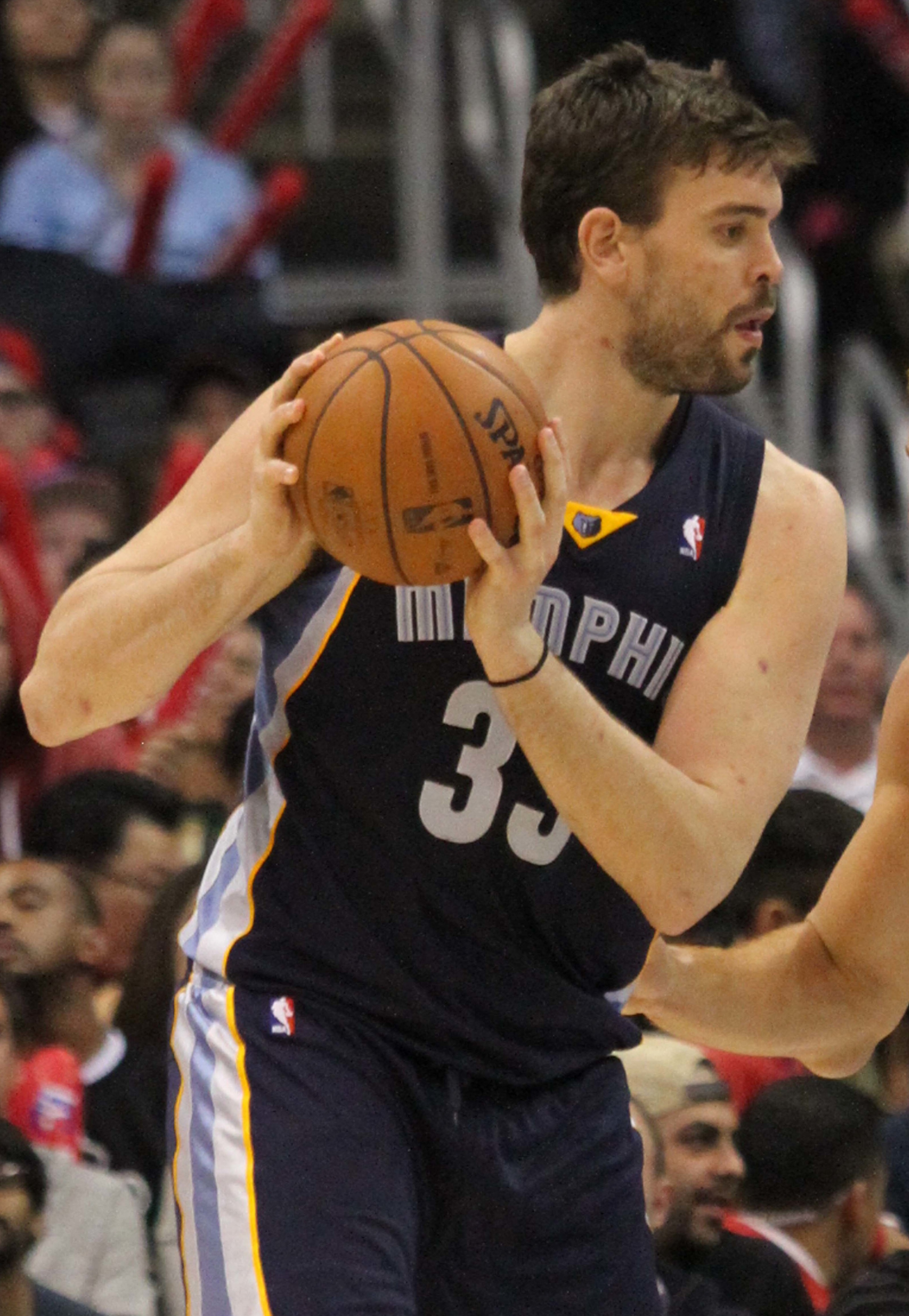
Gasol in November 2013

On December 5, 2016, Gasol recorded his second career triple-double with 28 points, 11 rebounds, and 11 assists in a 110–108 double-overtime win over the New Orleans Pelicans. On December 12, he was named Western Conference Player of the Week for games played December 5–11. It marked his second career Player of the Week award and the ninth time a Grizzlies player has won the weekly accolade. On January 25, 2017, he scored a career-high 42 points in a 101–99 win over the Toronto Raptors. A day later, he was named an NBA All-Star for the third time in his career. On March 16, 2017, he recorded his third career triple-double with 18 points, 10 rebounds, and 10 assists in a 103–91 win over the Atlanta Hawks.

==== 2017–18 season: 10,000 points ====
On December 2, 2017, Gasol passed 10,000 career points with 27 points in a 116–111 loss to the Cleveland Cavaliers. On January 26, 2018, Gasol recorded his fourth career triple-double with 13 points, 12 rebounds, and 10 assists in a 109–100 loss to the Los Angeles Clippers. In February 2018, Gasol played his 700th career NBA game and made his 689th start, surpassing Mike Conley Jr. for the most games started in franchise history.

==== 2018–19 season: Final season in Memphis ====
In November 2018, Gasol passed Zach Randolph (5,612) to become the Grizzlies' all-time career rebound leader. In December, Gasol made at least one 3-pointer in 13 consecutive games, which tied a career-high. He set a new record in the first game of January, making a 3-pointer in his 14th straight game on January 2 against the Detroit Pistons. The streak ended at 15 games. On January 23, he recorded his fifth career triple-double with 22 points, 17 rebounds, and 10 assists in a 118–107 loss to the Charlotte Hornets. This would end nearly two decades of a Gasol brother being on the Grizzlies roster.

=== Toronto Raptors (2019–2020) ===
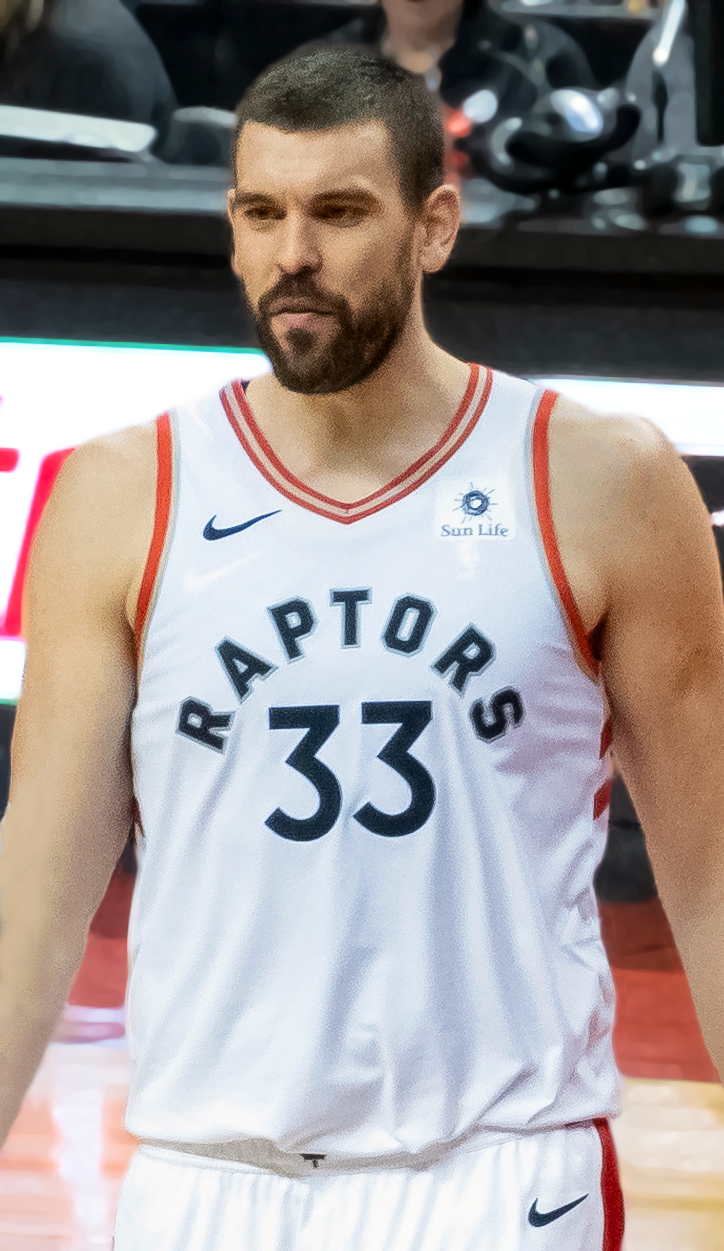
Gasol with the Raptors in 2019

On February 7, 2019, Gasol was traded to the Toronto Raptors in exchange for C. J. Miles, Jonas Valančiūnas, Delon Wright and a 2024 second-round draft pick. He made his debut for the Raptors two days later, recording seven points and six rebounds in 19 minutes off the bench in a 104–99 win over the New York Knicks. Gasol soon stepped into the starting center role in Toronto, and his pass-first offensive approach helped the Raptors become the NBA's top 3-point shooting team over the second half of the season. He helped the Raptors reach the 2019 NBA Finals. In his first ever NBA Finals game, Gasol scored 20 points and grabbed 7 rebounds in a win. After defeating the Golden State Warriors in six games, Marc joined his brother Pau, and his two championships in 2009 and 2010, as the first set of brothers to win NBA titles.

On June 26, 2019, Gasol opted in with the Toronto Raptors by exercising his $25.6 million player option for the 2019–20 season. On November 25, 2019, despite only scoring 3 points, Gasol had his best game of the season with 6 rebounds and 9 assists while holding Joel Embiid scoreless for the first time in his career in a 101–96 win over the Philadelphia 76ers.

=== Los Angeles Lakers (2020–2021) ===
On November 24, 2020, Gasol signed with the Los Angeles Lakers. On December 22, he made his Lakers debut, going scoreless while putting up one rebound and one assist in a 116–109 loss to the Los Angeles Clippers. Gasol missed nine games mid-season when he contracted COVID-19. He was moved to the bench after the team acquired Andre Drummond. On April 6, 2021, Gasol had 13 points, 9 rebounds, 5 assists, and 4 blocks in a Lakers 110–101 win over the Toronto Raptors. He started 42 games during the regular season but missed 20 others. In 19.1 minutes per game, he averaged 5.0 points and 4.1 rebounds while attempting 2.3 three-pointer per game, making 41.0%. In the postseason, the Lakers were up 2–1 in the first round against the Phoenix Suns, before losing three straight games and exiting the playoffs in six games. Trying to stave off elimination, the Lakers moved Gasol back into the starting lineup in Game 6, where he was scoreless but finished with seven assists in 18 minutes. During the offseason, the Lakers signed centers Dwight Howard and DeAndre Jordan.

On September 10, 2021, Gasol was traded back to the Memphis Grizzlies along with a 2024 second round pick in exchange for the draft rights to Wang Zhelin, saving the Lakers over $10 million in luxury-tax penalties; however, he was waived five days later by the Grizzlies.

=== Bàsquet Girona (2021–2023) ===
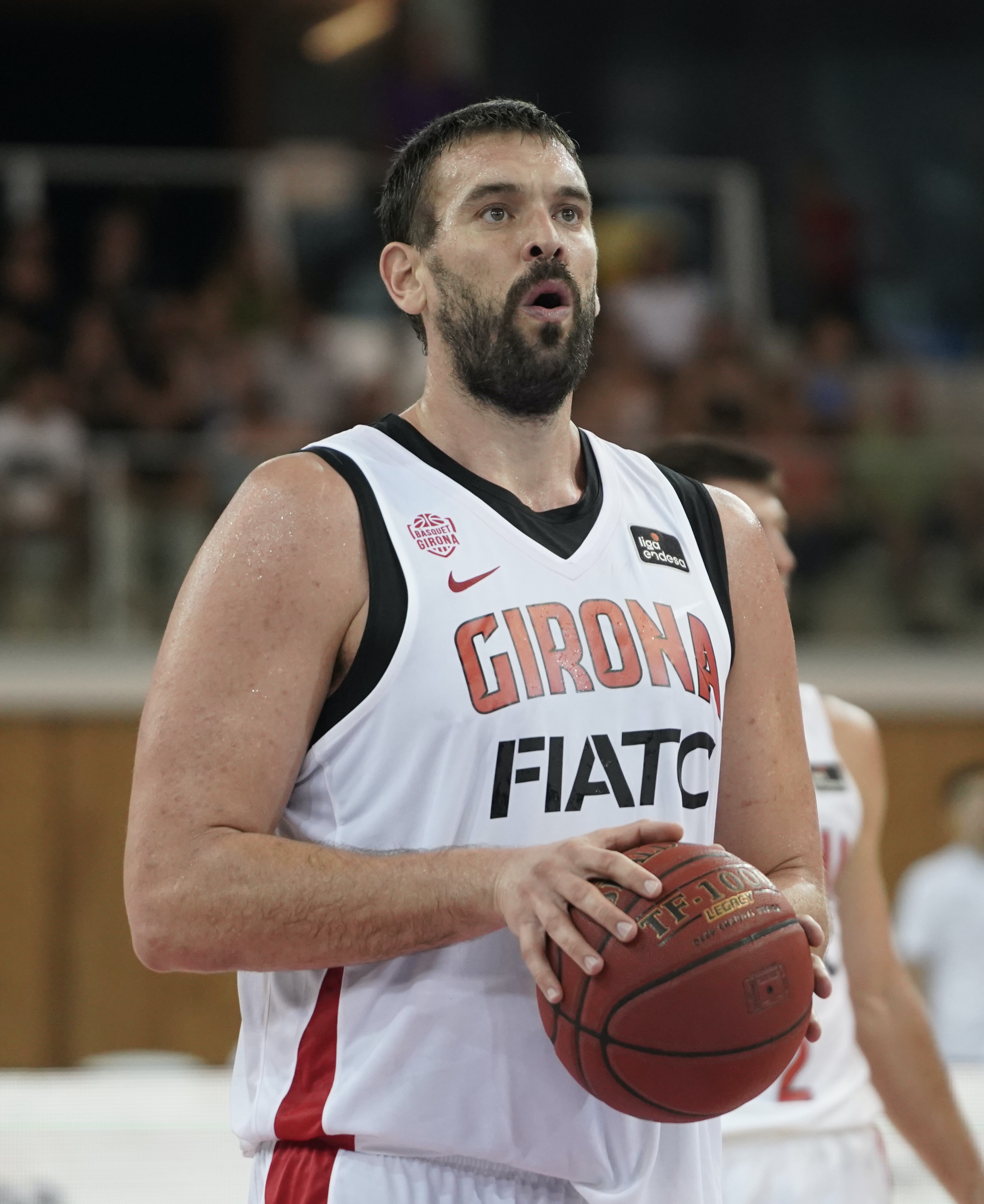
Gasol with Girona in 2022

On November 25, 2021, Gasol announced that he would play for Bàsquet Girona of the LEB Oro, the club that he founded, until the end of the 2021–22 season. He helped the team get promoted to the Liga ACB for the first time, after Girona beat Estudiantes 66–60 in the final of the promotion playoffs. Gasol added 11 points, 8 rebounds and 4 steals in the decisive final game. Over the season, he averaged 14.5 points and 8.2 rebounds in 25 appearances for Girona.

Gasol officially announced his retirement on January 31, 2024. On April 6, 2024, the Grizzlies retired his jersey number 33.

== National team career ==
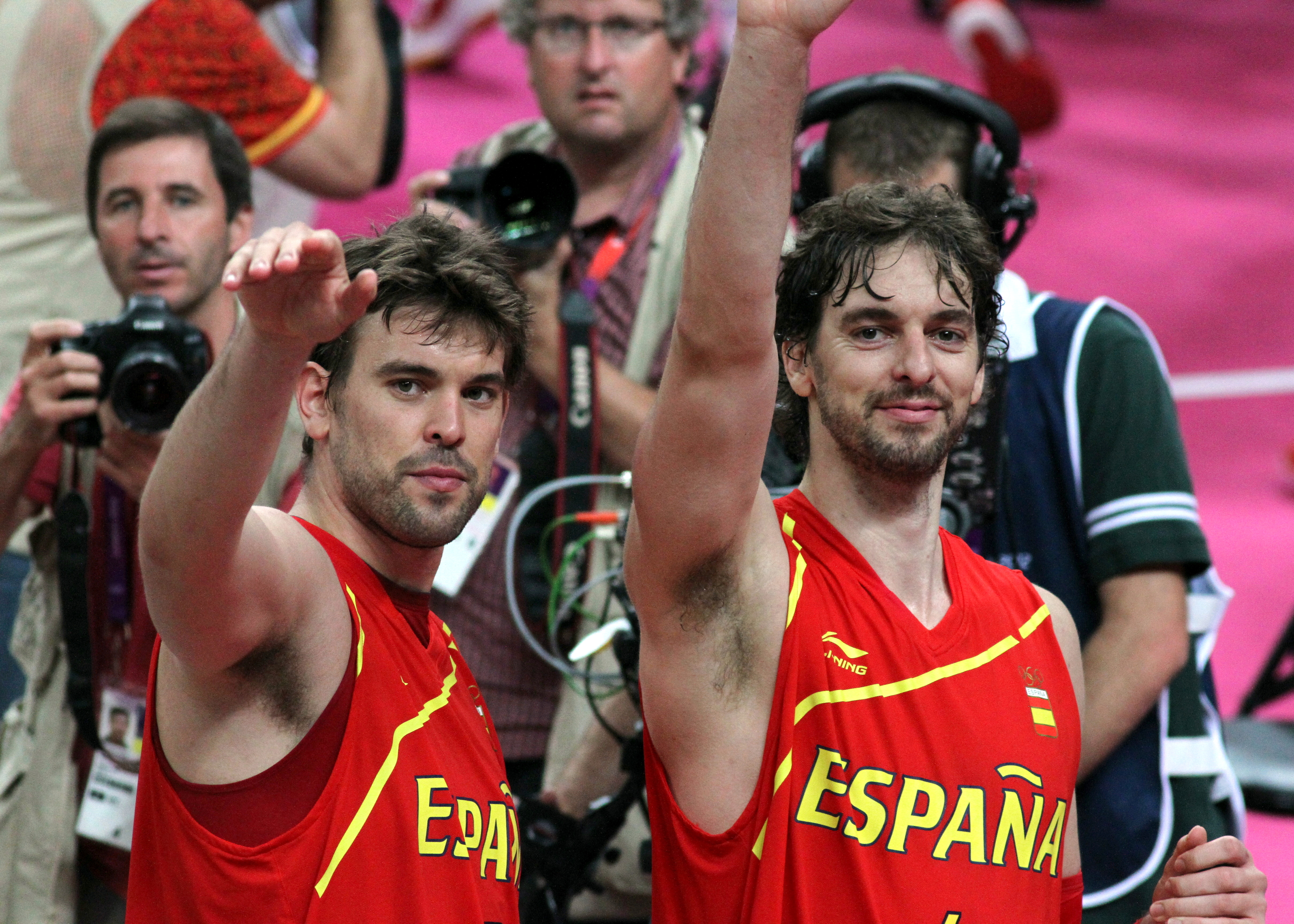
Marc (left) and his brother Pau playing for Spain at the 2012 Summer Olympics

In 2006, Gasol was named to the Spain national team for the 2006 FIBA World Championship in Japan as a replacement for NBA-draftee Fran Vázquez. Spain went on to win the gold medal in Japan, as well as at the EuroBasket 2009. He also won silver medals at the EuroBasket 2007, the 2008 Summer Olympics, and the 2012 Summer Olympics. He won his second world championship title with the Spanish team at the 2019 FIBA World Championship in China.

He also won the gold medal at the EuroBasket 2011, and bronze medals at the EuroBasket 2013 and the EuroBasket 2017.

At the 2019 FIBA Basketball World Cup, Gasol won his second World Cup title. Gasol scored 33 points in the semi-final to defeat Australia. He scored 14 points, had a team-high 7 assists, had 2 steals, and blocked 3 shots in the Final against Argentina. He was named to the World Cup All-Star Team along with teammate Ricky Rubio. Gasol became the second player in history to win an NBA championship and a World Cup in the same year, and the first non-American to win an NBA or WNBA title and either a World Cup or Olympic gold medal in the same year.

After the Spanish Basketball Team fell to the United States men's national basketball team by a score of 81–95 in the 2020 Summer Olympic Games, Marc and his brother Pau Gasol announced they were retiring from the Spanish national team. This was the informal end to an unprecedented era of success for the Spanish team.

== Awards and accomplishments ==
=== NBA ===
- NBA champion: 2019
- 3× NBA All-Star: 2012, 2015, 2017
- 2x All-NBA Team selections:
  - First Team: 2015
  - Second Team: 2013
- NBA All-Defensive Second Team: 2013
- NBA Defensive Player of the Year Award: 2013
- NBA All-Rookie Second Team: 2009

=== Spain ===
- Spanish ACB League Champion: 2004
- Spanish Supercup Winner: 2004
- Spanish ACB League MVP: 2008
- All-Spanish ACB League Team 2008
- FIBA EuroChallenge Champion: 2007
- Catalan Tournament Champion: 2007

=== European Player of the Year awards ===
- Euroscar: 2014

=== Spanish Senior National Team ===
- 2x Olympics silver medalist: 2008, 2012
- FIBA World Cup gold medalist: 2006, 2019
- FIBA World Cup All-Tournament Team: 2019
- 2x EuroBasket gold medalist: 2009, 2011
- EuroBasket silver medalist: 2007
- 2x EuroBasket bronze medalist: 2013, 2017
- EuroBasket All-Tournament Team: 2013

== NBA career statistics ==
Legend
GP	Games played	GS	Games started	MPG	Minutes per game
FG%	Field goal percentage	3P%	3-point field goal percentage	FT%	Free throw percentage
RPG	Rebounds per game	APG	Assists per game	SPG	Steals per game
BPG	Blocks per game	PPG	Points per game	**Bold**	Career high
†	Won an NBA championship	*	Led the league

=== Regular season ===
Year	Team	GP	GS	MPG	FG%	3P%	FT%	RPG	APG	SPG	BPG	PPG
2008–09	Memphis	**82***	75	30.7	.530	.000	.733	7.4	1.7	.8	1.1	11.9
2009–10	Memphis	69	69	35.8	**.581**	.000	.670	**9.3**	2.4	1.0	1.6	14.6
2010–11	Memphis	81	**81**	31.9	.527	.429	.748	7.0	2.5	.9	1.7	11.7
2011–12	Memphis	65	65	**36.5**	.482	.083	.748	8.9	3.1	1.0	**1.9**	14.6
2012–13	Memphis	80	80	35.0	.494	.071	**.848**	7.8	4.0	1.0	1.7	14.1
2013–14	Memphis	59	59	33.4	.473	.182	.768	7.2	3.6	1.0	1.3	14.6
2014–15	Memphis	81	**81**	33.2	.494	.176	.795	7.8	3.8	.9	1.6	17.4
2015–16	Memphis	52	52	34.4	.464	**.667**	.829	7.0	3.8	1.0	1.3	16.6
2016–17	Memphis	74	74	34.2	.459	.388	.837	6.3	4.6	.9	1.3	**19.5**
2017–18	Memphis	73	73	33.0	.420	.341	.834	8.1	4.2	.7	1.4	17.2
2018–19	Memphis	53	53	33.7	.444	.344	.756	8.6	**4.7**	**1.1**	1.2	15.7
2018–19†	Toronto	26	19	24.9	.465	.442	.769	6.6	3.9	.9	.9	9.1
2019–20	Toronto	44	43	26.4	.427	.385	.735	6.3	3.3	.8	.9	7.5
2020–21	L.A. Lakers	52	42	19.1	.454	.410	.720	4.1	2.1	.5	1.1	5.0
Career		891	866	32.2	.481	.360	.776	7.4	3.4	.9	1.4	14.0
All-Star		3	1	20.0	.556	.000	.000	7.6	3.3	1.0	.3	6.6

=== Playoffs ===
Year	Team	GP	GS	MPG	FG%	3P%	FT%	RPG	APG	SPG	BPG	PPG
2011	Memphis	13	13	39.9	.511	.000	.699	**11.2**	2.2	1.1	**2.2**	15.0
2012	Memphis	7	7	37.3	.522	.000	.791	6.7	3.1	.3	1.9	15.1
2013	Memphis	15	15	40.6	.454	.000	.800	8.5	3.2	.9	**2.2**	17.2
2014	Memphis	7	7	**42.7**	.405	.000	.794	7.7	4.4	**1.7**	.9	17.3
2015	Memphis	11	11	37.8	.394	.000	.852	10.3	**4.5**	.9	1.7	**19.7**
2017	Memphis	6	6	40.0	.470	.583	**.939**	6.5	4.2	.3	.7	19.3
2019†	Toronto	**24**	**24**	30.6	.422	.382	.870	6.4	3.0	.9	1.1	9.4
2020	Toronto	11	11	20.7	.391	.185	.733	4.4	2.6	.5	.6	6.0
2021	L.A Lakers	5	1	17.4	**.615**	**.636**	.750	3.8	3.0	.8	.8	5.2
Career		99	95	34.3	.444	.366	.808	7.5	3.2	.8	1.4	13.4

== See also ==
- List of European basketball players in the United States
- Bàsquet Girona, basketball club founded by Marc Gasol

Awards and achievements
Preceded by New York City Marathon	Princess of Asturias Award for Sports; 2015; With: Pau Gasol	Succeeded by Javier Gómez Noya
