= GEW Energy Dome =

Indoor sporting arena in Cologne, Germany

- Interactive map of GEW Energy Dome
- Location: Girlitzweg 30 50829 Köln
- Coordinates: 50°57′0.40″N 6°52′47.99″E
- Capacity: 3,232 (basketball)

Tenant
- Köln 99ers

GEW Energy Dome is an indoor sporting arena located in Cologne, Germany. The seating capacity of the arena is for 3,232 people and it is home to the Köln 99ers basketball team.
