= World's fair =

Large international exhibition

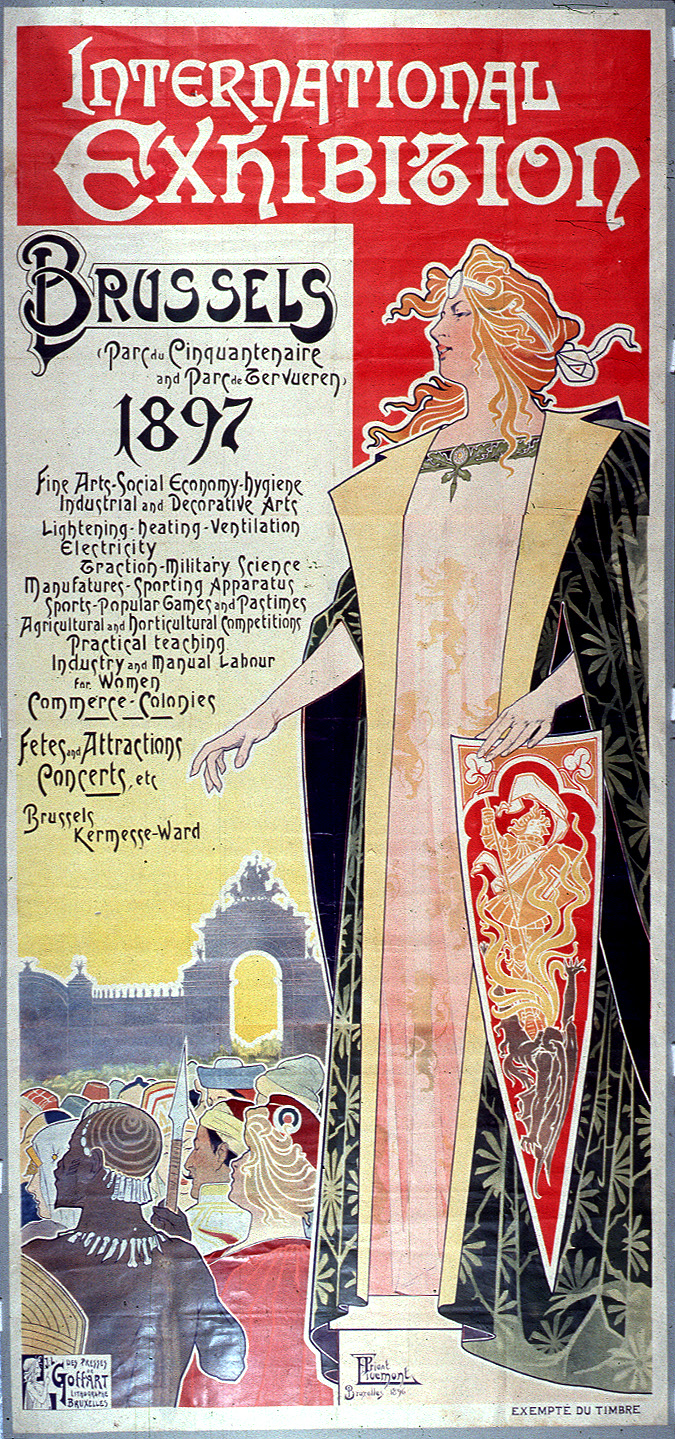
Poster advertising the Brussels International Exposition in 1897

A world's fair, also known as a universal exhibition, is a large global exhibition designed to showcase the achievements of nations. These exhibitions vary in character and are held in different parts of the world at a specific site for a period of time, typically between three and six months.

The term "world's fair" is commonly used in the United States, while the French term, Exposition universelle ("universal exhibition") is used in most of Europe and Asia; other terms include World Expo or Specialised Expo, with the word expo used for various types of exhibitions since at least 1958.

Since the adoption of the 1928 Convention Relating to International Exhibitions, the Paris-based Bureau International des Expositions (BIE) has served as an international sanctioning body for international exhibitions; four types of international exhibition are organised under its auspices: World Expos, Specialised Expos, Horticultural Expos (regulated by the International Association of Horticultural Producers), and the Milan Triennial.

Osaka, Japan held the most recent World Expo in 2025, while Astana, Kazakhstan, held the most recent Specialised Expo in 2017, and Doha, Qatar, held the most recent Horticultural Expo in 2023.

== History ==
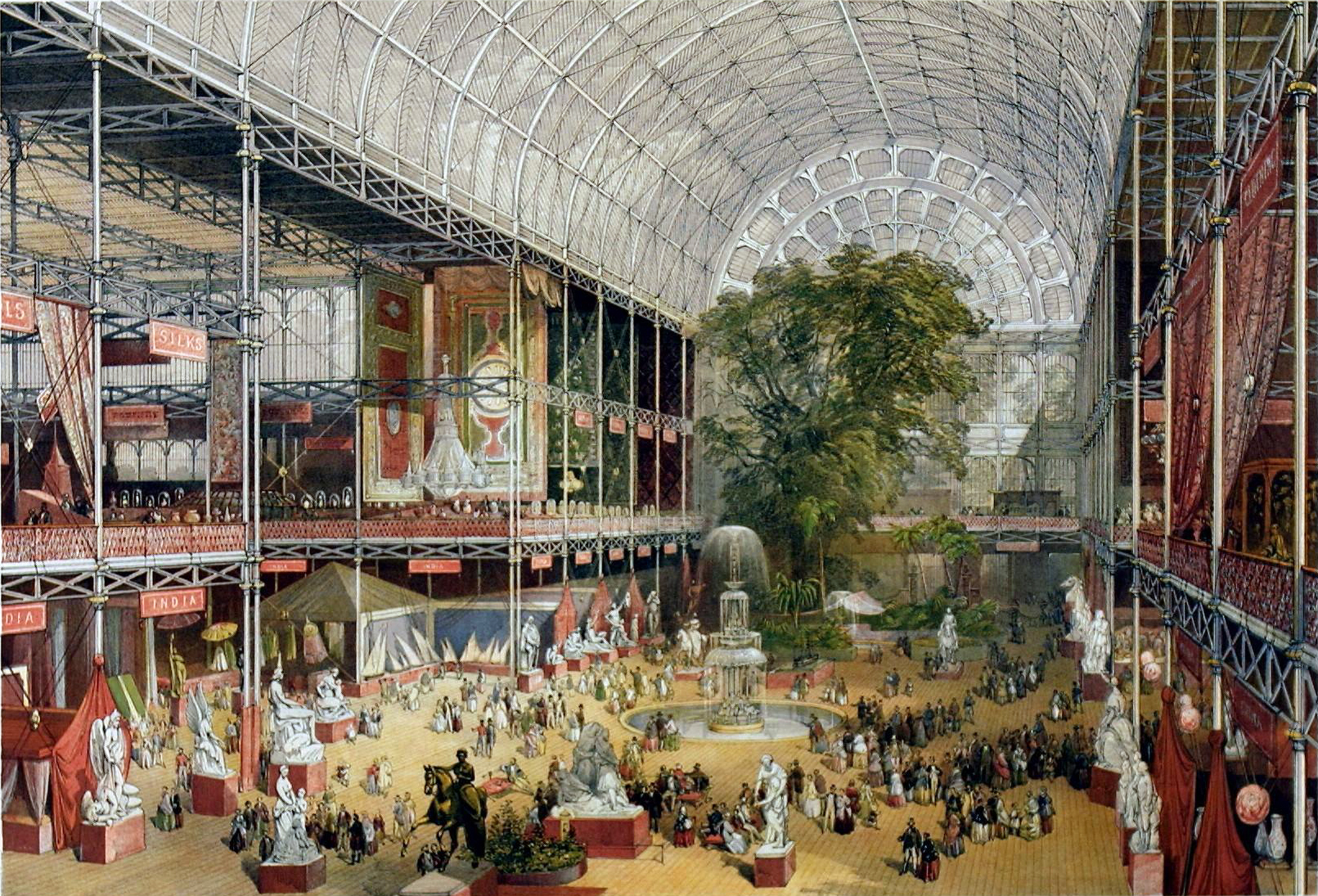
Interior of the Crystal Palace at the Great Exhibition in Hyde Park, London, in 1851

In 1791, Prague organized the first World's Fair, in Bohemia (modern-day Czech Republic). The first industrial exhibition was on the occasion of the coronation of Leopold II as king of Bohemia. The exhibition was held in the Clementinum, and celebrated the considerable sophistication of manufacturing methods in the region during that time period.

France had a tradition of national exhibitions, which culminated with the French Industrial Exposition of 1844 held in Paris. This fair was followed by other national exhibitions in Europe. In 1851, the "Great Exhibition of the Works of Industry of All Nations" was held in the Crystal Palace in Hyde Park, London, United Kingdom. It was an idea of Prince Albert, Queen Victoria's husband.

The character of world fairs, or expositions, has evolved since. Three eras can be distinguished: the era of industrialization, the era of cultural exchange, and the era of nation branding.

=== Industrialization (1851–1938) ===
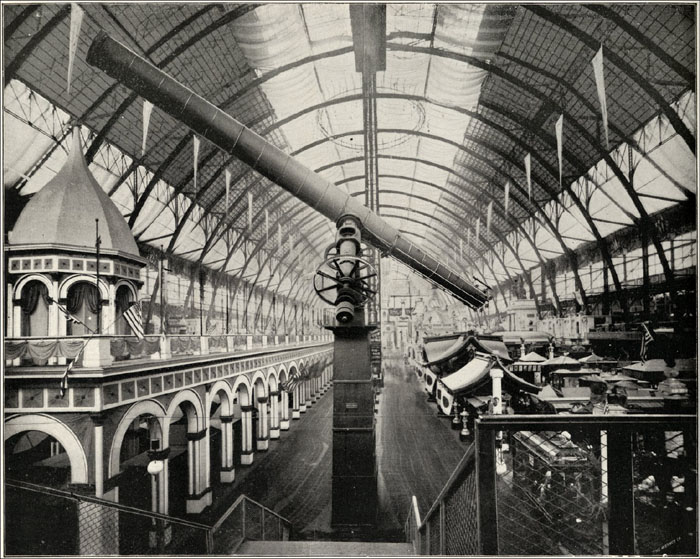
The Yerkes great refractor telescope mounted at the 1893 World's Fair in Chicago

The first era, the era of "industrialization", roughly covered the years from 1850 to 1938. In these years, world expositions were largely focused on trade and displayed technological advances and inventions. World expositions were platforms for state-of-the-art science and technology from around the world. The world expositions of 1851 London, 1853 New York, 1862 London, 1876 Philadelphia, Paris 1878, 1888 Barcelona, 1889 Paris, 1891 Prague, 1893 Chicago, 1897 Brussels, 1900 Paris, 1904 St. Louis, 1915 San Francisco, and 1933–1934 Chicago were notable in this respect. Inventions such as the telephone were first presented during this era. This era set the basic character of the world fair.

=== Cultural exchange (1939–1987) ===
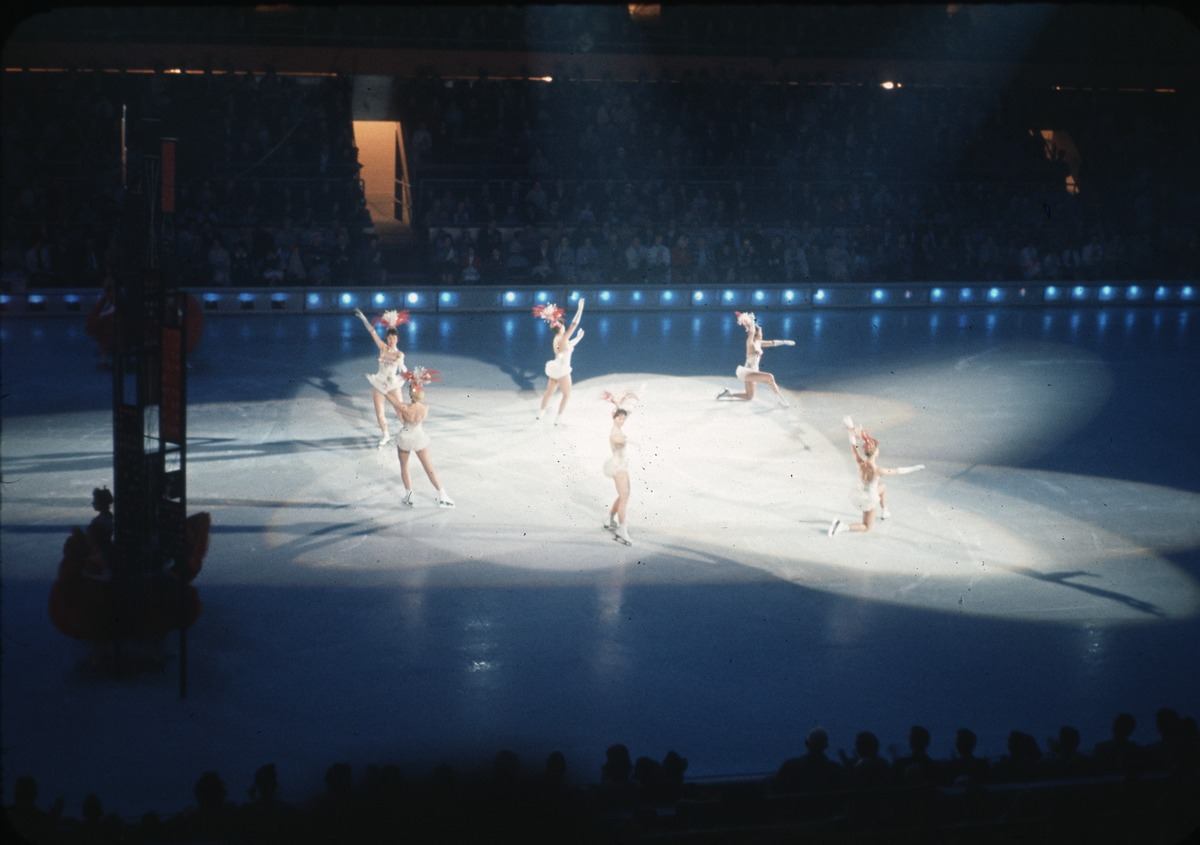
Ice Follies at the Seattle 1962 World's Fair

The 1939–1940 New York World's Fair, and those that followed, took a different approach, one less focused on technology and aimed more at cultural themes and social progress. For instance, the theme of the 1939 fair was "Building the World of Tomorrow"; at the 1964–1965 New York World's Fair, it was "Peace Through Understanding"; at the 1967 International and Universal Exposition in Montreal, it was "Man and His World". These fairs encouraged effective intercultural communication along with sharing of technological innovation.

The 1967 International and Universal Exposition in Montreal was promoted under the name Expo 67. Event organizers retired the term world's fair in favor of Expo, a term already popular in French language and used as far back as the Brussels World Fair in 1958. The Montreal Expos, a former Major League Baseball team, was named for the 1967 fair.

=== Nation branding (1988–present) ===
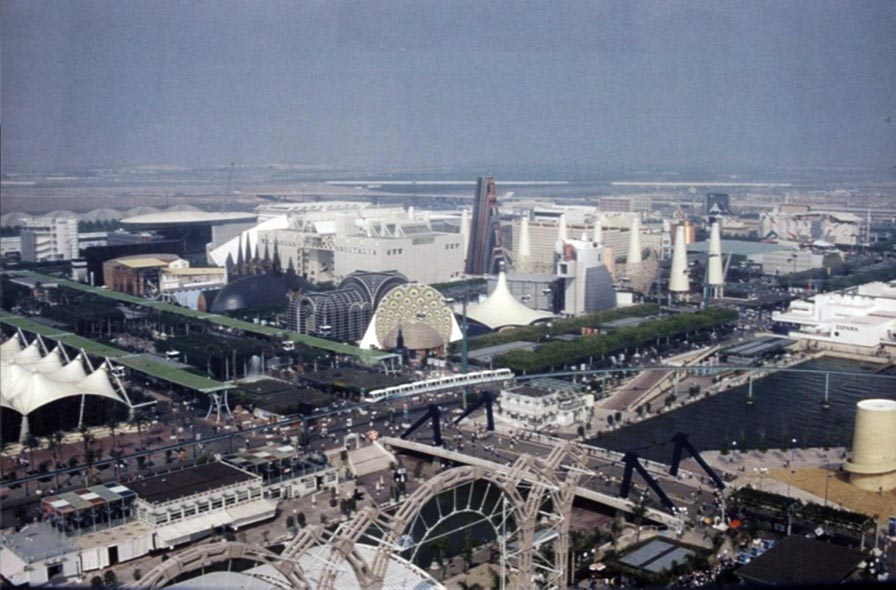
1992 Expo in Seville, Spain

From World Expo 88 in Brisbane onwards, countries started to use expositions as a platform to improve their national image through their pavilions. Finland, Japan, Canada, France, and Spain are cases in point. A major study by Tjaco Walvis called "Expo 2000 Hanover in Numbers" showed that improving national image was the main goal for 73% of the countries participating in Expo 2000. Pavilions became a kind of advertising campaign, and the Expo served as a vehicle for "nation branding". According to branding expert Wally Olins, Spain used Expo '92 and the 1992 Summer Olympics in Barcelona in the same year to underscore its new position as a modern and democratic country and to show itself as a prominent member of the European Union and the global community.

At Expo 2000 Hanover, countries created their own architectural pavilions, investing, on average, €12 million each. Given these costs, governments are sometimes hesitant to participate, because the benefits may not justify the costs. However, while the effects are difficult to measure, an independent study for the Dutch pavilion at Expo 2000 estimated that the pavilion (which cost around €35 million) generated around €350 million of potential revenues for the Dutch economy. It also identified several key success factors for world-exposition pavilions in general.

== Types ==
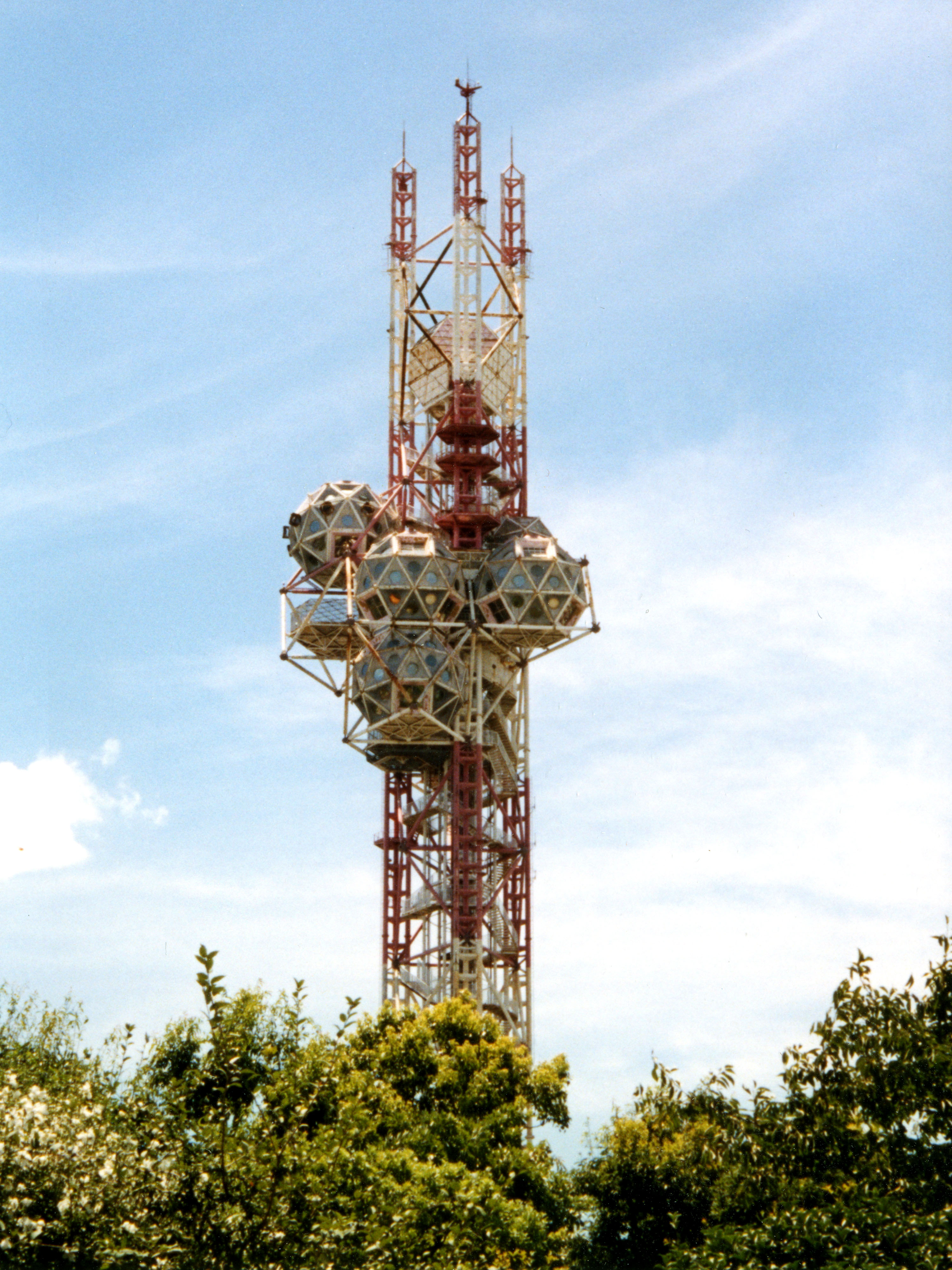
Expo tower for the Osaka 1970 World Expo in Japan

At present there are two types of international exhibition: World Expos (formally known as International Registered Exhibitions) and Specialised Expos (formally known as International Recognised Exhibitions). World Expos, previously known as universal expositions, are the biggest category events. At World Expos, participants generally build their own pavilions. They are therefore the most extravagant and most expensive expos. Their duration may be between six weeks and six months. Since 1995, the interval between two World Expos has been at least five years. World Expo 2015 was held in Milan, Italy, from 1 May to 31 October 2015.

Specialised Expos are smaller in scope and investments and generally shorter in duration; between three weeks and three months. Previously, these Expos were called Special Exhibitions or International Specialized Exhibitions but these terms are no longer used officially. Their total surface area must not exceed 25 hectares (62 acres) and organizers must build pavilions for the participating states, free of rent, charges, taxes and expenses. The largest country pavilions may not exceed 1,000 m^{2} (1/4 acre). Only one Specialised Expo can be held between two World Expos.

An additional two types of international exhibition may be recognized by the BIE: horticultural exhibitions, which are joint BIE and AIPH-sanctioned 'garden' fairs in which participants present gardens and garden pavilions; and the semi-regular Milan Triennial (not always held every third year) art and design exhibition, held in Milan, Italy, with the BIE granting official international exhibition status to 14 editions of the Triennale between 1996 and 2016.

=== World Expos ===
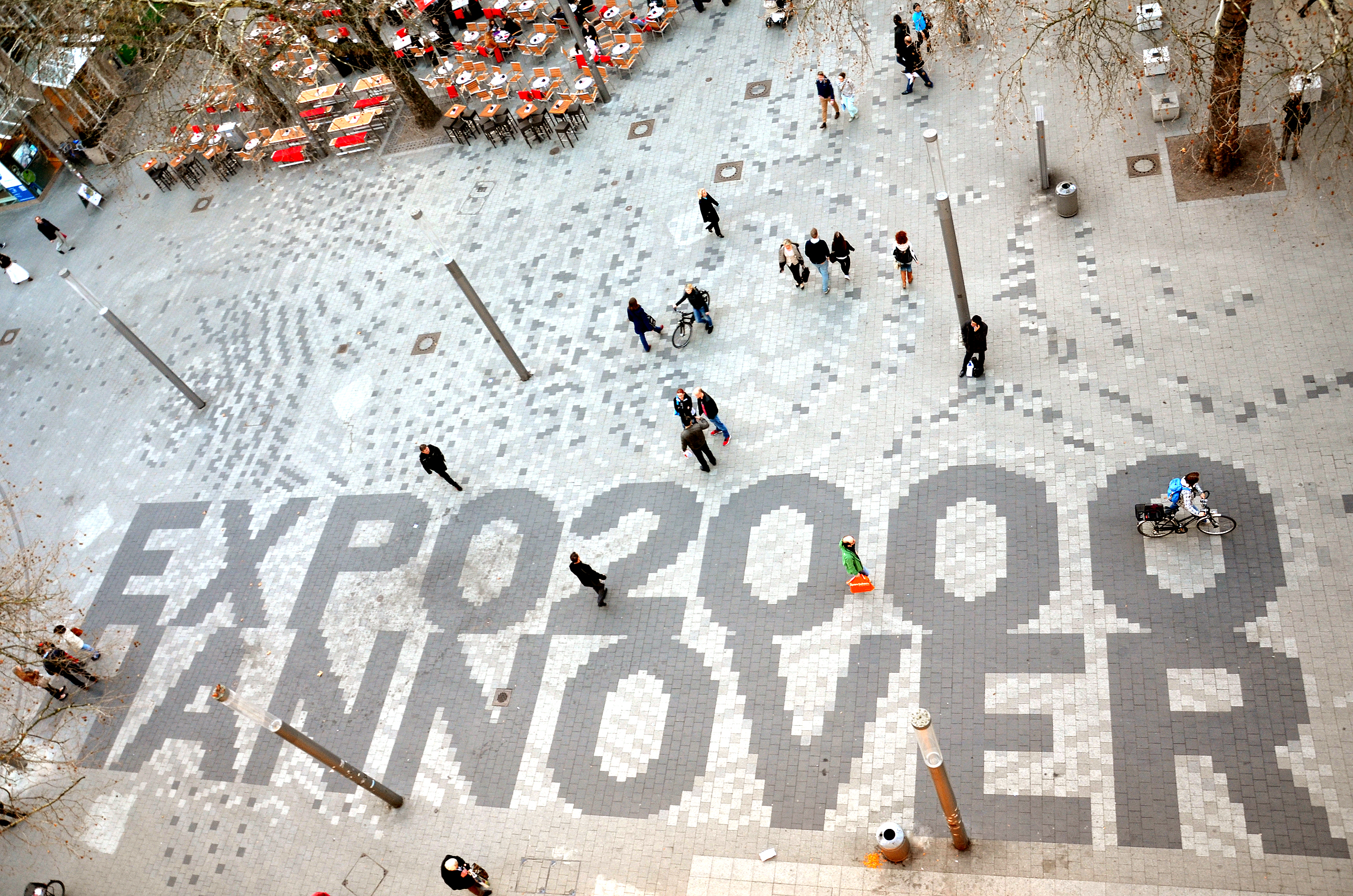
Expo 2000 brickwork, for the World Expo in Hannover, Germany, in 2000

World Expos (formally known as International Registered Exhibitions) encompass universal themes that affect the full gamut of human experience, and international and corporate participants are required to adhere to the theme in their representations. Registered expositions are held every 5 years because they are more expensive as they require total design of pavilion buildings from the ground up. As a result, nations compete for the most outstanding or memorable structure—for example Japan, France, Morocco, and Spain at Expo '92. Sometimes prefabricated structures are used to minimize costs for developing countries, or for countries from a geographical block to share space (i.e. Plaza of the Americas at Seville '92).

In the 21st century the BIE has moved to sanction World Expos every five years; following the numerous expos of the 1980s and 1990s, some see this as a means to cut down potential expenditure by participating nations. The move was also seen by some as an attempt to avoid conflicting with the Summer Olympics. World Expos are restricted to every five years, with Specialized Expos in the in-between years.

=== Specialised Expos ===
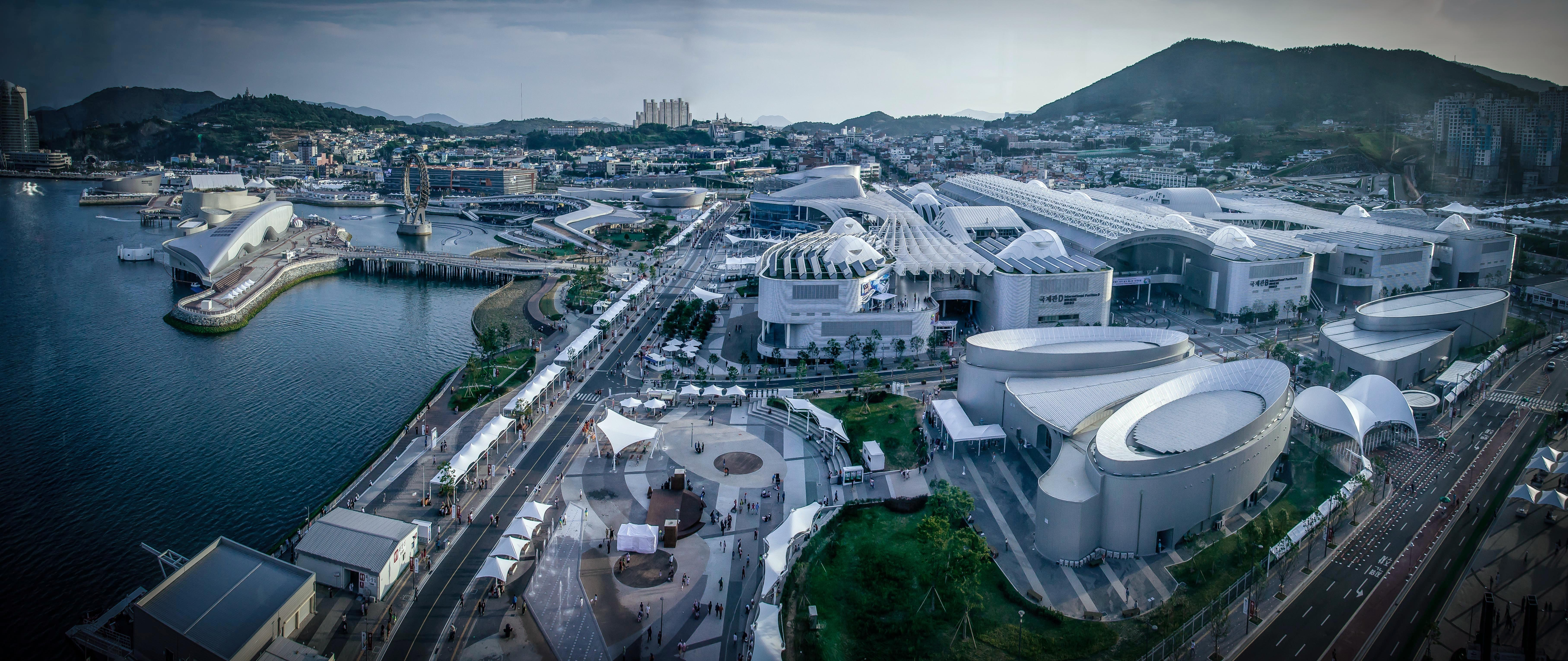
Panoramic view of Expo 2012 Yeosu, in South Korea

Specialized Expos (formally known as International Recognized Exhibitions) are usually united by a precise theme—such as "Future Energy" (Expo 2017 Astana), "The Living Ocean and Coast" (Expo 2012 Yeosu), or "Leisure in the Age of Technology" (Brisbane, Expo '88). Such themes are more specific than the wider scope of world expositions.

Specialized Expos are usually smaller in scale and cheaper to run for the host committee and participants because the architectural fees are lower and they only have to customize pavilion space provided free of charge from the Organiser, usually with the prefabricated structure already completed. Countries then have the option of "adding" their own colours, design etc. to the outside of the prefabricated structure and filling in the inside with their own content.

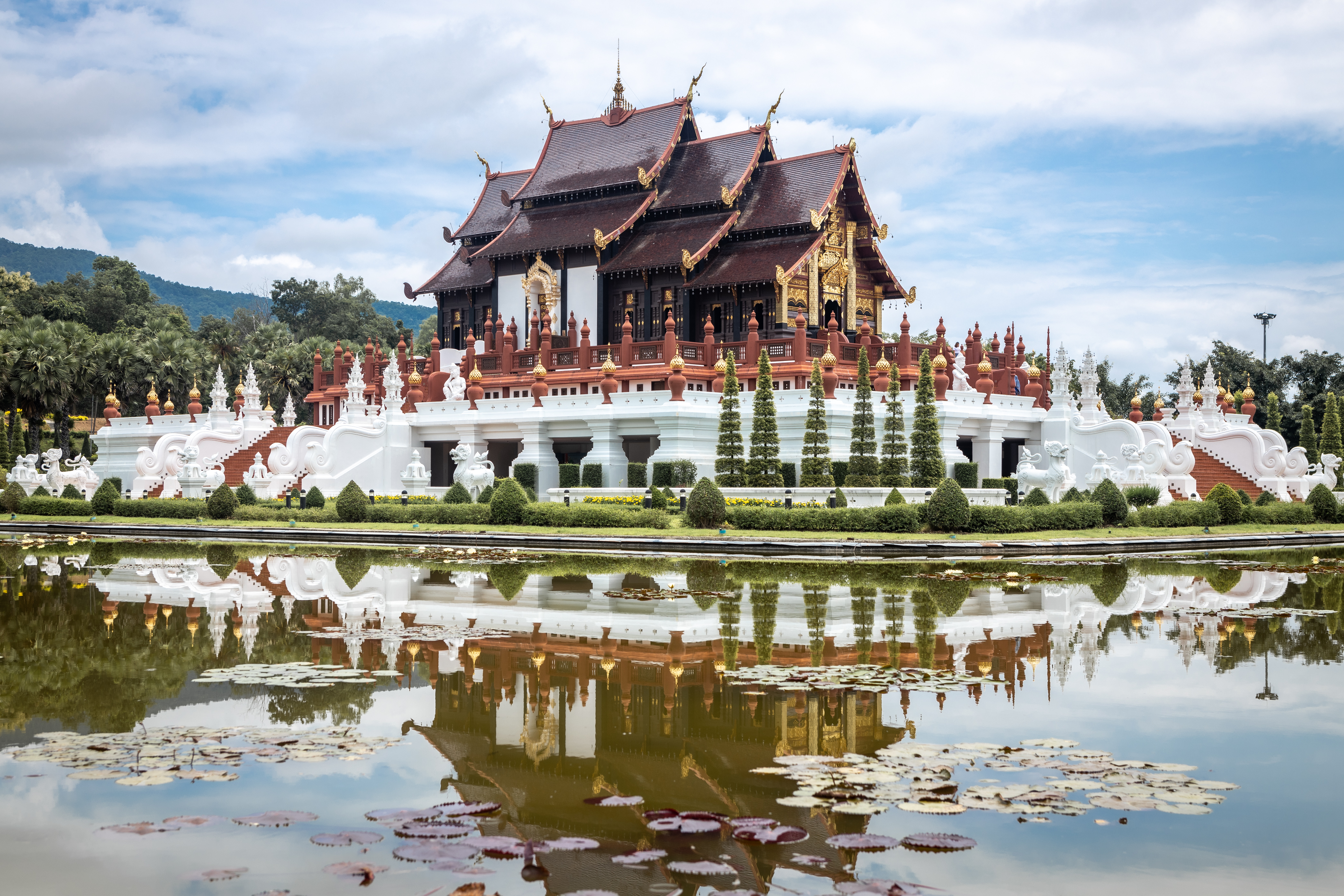
The Royal Pavilion of Royal Flora Ratchaphruek 2006, in Chiang Mai, Thailand

=== Horticultural Expos ===
Horticultural Expos (formally known as A1 International Horticultural Exhibitions) are co-regulated by International Association of Horticultural Producers. Like Specialised Expos are organized in a precise theme—such as "Green Desert, Better Environment" (International Horticultural Expo 2023 Doha Qatar), "Growing Green Cities" (Floriade 2022), or "Building a Beautiful Home Featuring Harmonious Coexistence between Man and Nature" (Expo 2019).

The purpose of these exhibitions is to foster cooperation and the sharing of knowledge and solutions between countries, horticultural producers and agricultural industries by addressing the paramount issues of healthy lifestyles, green economies, sustainable living, education and innovation.

== List of expositions ==
List of official world expositions (Universal and International/Specialised/Horticultural) according to the Bureau International des Expositions. The 1964 New York World's Fair was held without receiving approval from the BIE therefore it is not listed below.

=== World Expos ===
Year	Location	Dates	Area (ha)	Visitors	Participants	Theme
1851	(United Kingdom of Great Britain and Ireland) London, United Kingdom	1 May – 11 October 1851	10.40	6,039,195	25	Industry of all Nations
1855	(Second French Empire) Paris, France	15 May – 15 November 1855	15.20	5,162,330	28	Agriculture, Industry and Fine Arts
1862	(United Kingdom of Great Britain and Ireland) London, United Kingdom	1 May – 1 November 1862	11	6,096,617	39	Industry and Art
1867	(Second French Empire) Paris, France	1 April – 3 November 1867	68.70	15,000,000	42	Agriculture, Industry and Fine Arts
1873	Vienna, Austria-Hungary	1 May – 31 October 1873	233	7,255,000	35	Culture and Education
1876	Philadelphia, United States	10 May – 10 November 1876	115	10,000,000	35	Arts, Manufactures and Products of the Soil and Mine
1878	(French Third Republic) Paris, France	20 May – 10 November 1878	75	16,156,626	35	New Technologies
1880	Melbourne, Colony of Victoria	1 October 1880 – 30 April 1881	25	1,330,000	33	Arts, Manufactures and Agricultural and Industrial Products of all Nations
1888	(Restoration (Spain)) Barcelona, Spain	8 April – 10 December 1888	46.50	2,300,000	30	Fine and Industrial Art
1889	(French Third Republic) Paris, France	5 May – 31 October 1889	96	32,250,297	35	Celebration of the centenary of the French revolution
1893	Chicago, United States	1 May – 3 October 1893	290	27,500,000	19	Fourth centenary of the discovery of America
1897	Brussels, Belgium	10 May – 8 November 1897	36	6,000,000	27	Modern Life
1900	(French Third Republic) Paris, France	15 April – 12 November 1900	120	50,860,801	40	19th century: an overview
1904	St. Louis, United States	30 April – 1 December 1904	500	19,694,855	60	Celebration of the centennial of the Louisiana Purchase
1905	Liège, Belgium	27 April – 6 November 1905	70	7,000,000	35	Commemoration of the 75th anniversary of independence
1906	(Kingdom of Italy) Milan, Italy	28 April – 11 November 1906	100	4,012,776	40	Transportation
1910	Brussels, Belgium	23 April – 7 November 1910	30	13,000,000	26	Works of Art and Science, Agricultural and Industrial Products of All Nations
1913	Ghent, Belgium	26 April – 3 November 1913	130	9,503,419	24	Peace, Industry and Art
1915	San Francisco, United States	20 February – 4 December 1915	254	18,876,438	41	Celebrating the opening of the Panama Canal
1929	(Restoration (Spain)) Barcelona, Spain	20 May 1929 – 15 January 1930	118	5,800,000	29	Industry, Art and Sport
1933	Chicago, United States	27 May 1933 – 31 October 1934	170	38,872,000	21	The independence among Industry and scientific research.
1935	Brussels, Belgium	27 April – 3 November 1935	152	20,000,000	25	Transport
1937	(French Third Republic) Paris, France	25 May – 25 November 1937	104	31,040,955	35	Arts and technology in modern life
1939	New York City, United States	30 April 1939 – 27 October 1940	500	45,000,000	54	Building the World of Tomorrow
1949	(Republic of Haiti (1859–1957)) Port-au-Prince, Haiti	8 December 1949 – 8 June 1950	30	250,000	18	The festival of Peace
1958	Brussels, Belgium	17 April – 19 October 1958	200	41,454,412	39	A World View: A New Humanism
1962	Seattle, United States	21 April – 21 October 1962	30	9,000,000	49	Man in the Space Age
1967	Montreal, Canada	28 April – 29 October 1967	400	54,991,806	62	Man and his World
1970	Osaka, Japan	15 March – 13 September 1970	330	64,218,770	67	Progress and Harmony for Mankind
1992	Seville, Spain	20 April – 12 October 1992	215	41,814,571	108	The Age of Discovery
2000	Hanover, Germany	1 June – 31 October 2000	160	18,100,000	174	Humankind – Nature – Technology
2005	Aichi, Japan	25 March – 25 September 2005	173	22,049,544	121	Nature's Wisdom
2010	Shanghai, China	1 May – 31 October 2010	523	73,085,000	192	Better City, Better Life
2015	Milan, Italy	1 May – 31 October 2015	110	22,200,000	139	Feeding the Planet, Energy for Life
2020	Dubai, United Arab Emirates	1 October 2021 – 31 March 2022	438	24,102,967	200	Connecting Minds, Creating the Future
2025	Osaka·Kansai, Japan	13 April – 13 October 2025	155	25,578,986	165	Designing Future Society for Our Lives
2030	Riyadh, Saudi Arabia	1 October 2030 – 31 March 2031	600			Foresight for Tomorrow

=== Specialised Expos ===
Year	Location	Dates	Area (ha)	Visitors	Participants	Theme
1936	Stockholm, Sweden	15 May – 1 June 1936	N/A	N/A	8	Aviation
1938	Helsinki, Finland	14–22 May 1938	N/A	N/A	25	Aerospace
1939	Liège, Belgium	20 May – 2 September 1939	50	N/A	8	Art of Water
1947	(French Fourth Republic) Paris, France	10 July – 15 August 1947	6.35	N/A	14	Urbanism and Housing
1949	Stockholm, Sweden	27 July – 13 August 1949	N/A	N/A	14	Sport and physical culture
1949	(French Fourth Republic) Lyon, France	24 September – 9 October 1949	110	N/A	N/A	Rural Habitat
1951	(French Fourth Republic) Lille, France	28 April – 20 May 1951	15	1,500,000	24	Textile
1953	Rome, Italy	26 July – 31 October 1953	12	1,700,000	N/A	Agriculture
1953	Jerusalem, Israel	22 September – 14 October 1953	4.60	600,000	13	Conquest of the Desert
1954	Naples, Italy	15 May – 15 October 1954	100	N/A	25	Navigation
1955	Turin, Italy	25 May – 15 June 1955	N/A	120,000	11	Sport
1955	Helsingborg, Sweden	10 June – 28 August 1955	N/A	N/A	10	Modern Man in the Environment
1956	Beit Dagan, Israel	21 May – 20 June 1956	55	N/A	N/A	Citrus
1957	West Berlin, West Germany	6 July – 29 September 1957	N/A	1,000,000	13	Reconstruction of Hansa District
1961	Turin, Italy	1 May – 31 September 1961	50	5,000,000	19	Man and his Work – A Century of Technological and Social Developments
1965	Munich, West Germany	25 June – 3 October 1965	50.20	2,500,000	31	Transport
1968	San Antonio, United States	6 April – 6 October 1968	39	6,384,482	23	The confluence of civilizations in the Americas
1971	(Hungarian People's Republic) Budapest, Hungary	27 August – 30 September 1971	35	1,900,000	35	The Hunt through the World
1974	Spokane, United States	4 May – 2 November 1974	40	5,600,000	56	Celebrating Tomorrow's Fresh New Environment
1975	Okinawa, Japan	20 July 1975 – 18 January 1976	100	3,485,750	35	The Sea We would like to See
1981	(People's Republic of Bulgaria) Plovdiv, Bulgaria	14 June – 12 July 1981	51	N/A	70	Earth – Planet of Life
1982	Knoxville, United States	1 May – 31 October 1982	29	11,127,780	16	Energy turns the World
1984	New Orleans, United States	12 May – 11 November 1984	34	7,335,000	15	The World of rivers – Fresh Water as a source of life
1985	Tsukuba, Japan	17 March – 16 September 1985	100	20,334,727	48	Dwellings and surroundings – Science and Technology for Man at Home
1985	(People's Republic of Bulgaria) Plovdiv, Bulgaria	4–30 November 1985	5.80	1,000,000	54	Inventions
1986	Vancouver, Canada	2 May – 13 October 1986	70	22,111,578	55	Transportation and Communication: World in Motion – World in Touch
1988	Brisbane, Australia	30 April – 30 October 1988	40	18,560,447	36	Leisure in the age of Technology
1991	Plovdiv, Bulgaria	7 June – 7 July 1991	N/A	N/A	9	The activity of young people in the service of a World of Peace
1992	Genoa, Italy	15 May – 15 August 1992	6	817,045	52	Christopher Colombus: The Ship and the Sea
1993	Daejeon, South Korea	7 August – 7 November 1993	90.10	14,005,808	141	The Challenge of a New Road of Development
1998	Lisbon, Portugal	22 May – 30 September 1998	50	10,128,204	160	The Oceans: a heritage for the Future
2008	Zaragoza, Spain	14 June – 14 September 2008	25	5,650,943	108	Water and sustainable development
2012	Yeosu, South Korea	14 May – 12 August 2012	25	8,203,956	103	The living ocean and coast
2017	Astana, Kazakhstan	10 June – 10 September 2017	35	3,977,545	137	Future Energy
2027	Belgrade, Serbia	15 May – 15 August 2027	25			Play for Humanity – Sport and Music for All

=== Horticultural Expos ===
Year	Location	Dates	Area (ha)	Visitors	Participants	Theme
1960	Rotterdam, Netherlands	25 March – 25 September 1960	50	4,000,000	N/A	International Horticulture
1963	Hamburg, West Germany	26 April – 13 October 1963	76	5,400,000	35	Horticulture of all Categories from the Point of View of Economics and Culture
1964	Vienna, Austria	16 April – 11 October 1964	100	2,100,000	28	International Horticulture
1969	Paris, France	23 April – 5 October 1969	28	2,400,000	17	Flowers of France and Flowers of the World
1972	Amsterdam, Netherlands	26 March – 1 October 1972	75	4,300,000	N/A	Efforts accomplished by International Horticulture
1973	Hamburg, West Germany	27 April – 7 October 1973	76	5,800,000	50	International Horticulture
1974	Vienna, Austria	18 April – 14 October 1974	100	2,600,000	30	International Horticulture
1980	Montreal, Canada	17 May – 1 September 1980	40	N/A	23	Relationship between man's socio-cultural activities and his physical environment
1982	Amsterdam, Netherlands	8 April – 10 October 1982	50	4,600,000	17	International Horticulture
1983	Munich, West Germany	28 April – 9 October 1983	72	11,600,000	23	International Horticulture
1984	Liverpool, United Kingdom	2 May – 14 October 1984	95	3,380,000	29	The progress accomplished by International and National Horticulture
1990	Osaka, Japan	1 April – 30 September 1990	140	23,126,934	83	The Harmonious Coexistence of Nature and Mankind
1992	Zoetermeer, Netherlands	10 April – 12 October 1992	68	3,355,600	23	Horticulture is being involved in a continuous process of renewal
1993	Stuttgart, Germany	23 April – 17 October 1993	64	7,311,000	40	City and Nature – Responsible Approach
1999	Kunming, China	1 May – 31 October 1999	218	9,427,000	70	Man and Nature – Marching into the 21st century
2002	Haarlemmermeer, Netherlands	25 April – 20 October 2002	140	2,071,000	30	The contribution of the Netherlands horticulture and international horticulture
2003	Rostock, Germany	25 April – 12 October 2003	100	2,600,000	32	A Seaside Park. A new flowered world
2006	Chiang Mai, Thailand	1 November 2006 – 31 January 2007	80	3,848,791	32	To Express the Love for Humanity
2012	Venlo, Netherlands	5 April – 7 October 2012	66	2,046,684	38	Be part of the theatre in nature; get closer to the quality of life
2016	Antalya, Turkey	23 April – 30 October 2016	112	4,693,571	54	Flowers and Children
2019	Beijing, China	29 April – 7 October 2019	503	9,340,000	110	Live Green, Live Better
2022	Almere, Netherlands	14 April – 9 October 2022	60	685,189	32	Growing Green Cities
2023	Doha, Qatar	2 October 2023 – 28 March 2024	80	N/A	N/A	Green Desert, Better Environment
2027	Yokohama, Japan	19 March – 26 September 2027	80			Scenery of the Future for Happiness
2029	Nakhon Ratchasima, Thailand	10 November 2029 – 28 February 2030	109			Nature and Greenery: Envisioning the Green Future
2031	Minnesota, United States	1 May – 15 October 2031	90.6			Human/Nature: Where Humanity and Horticulture Meet

== Legacies ==
=== Remaining structures ===
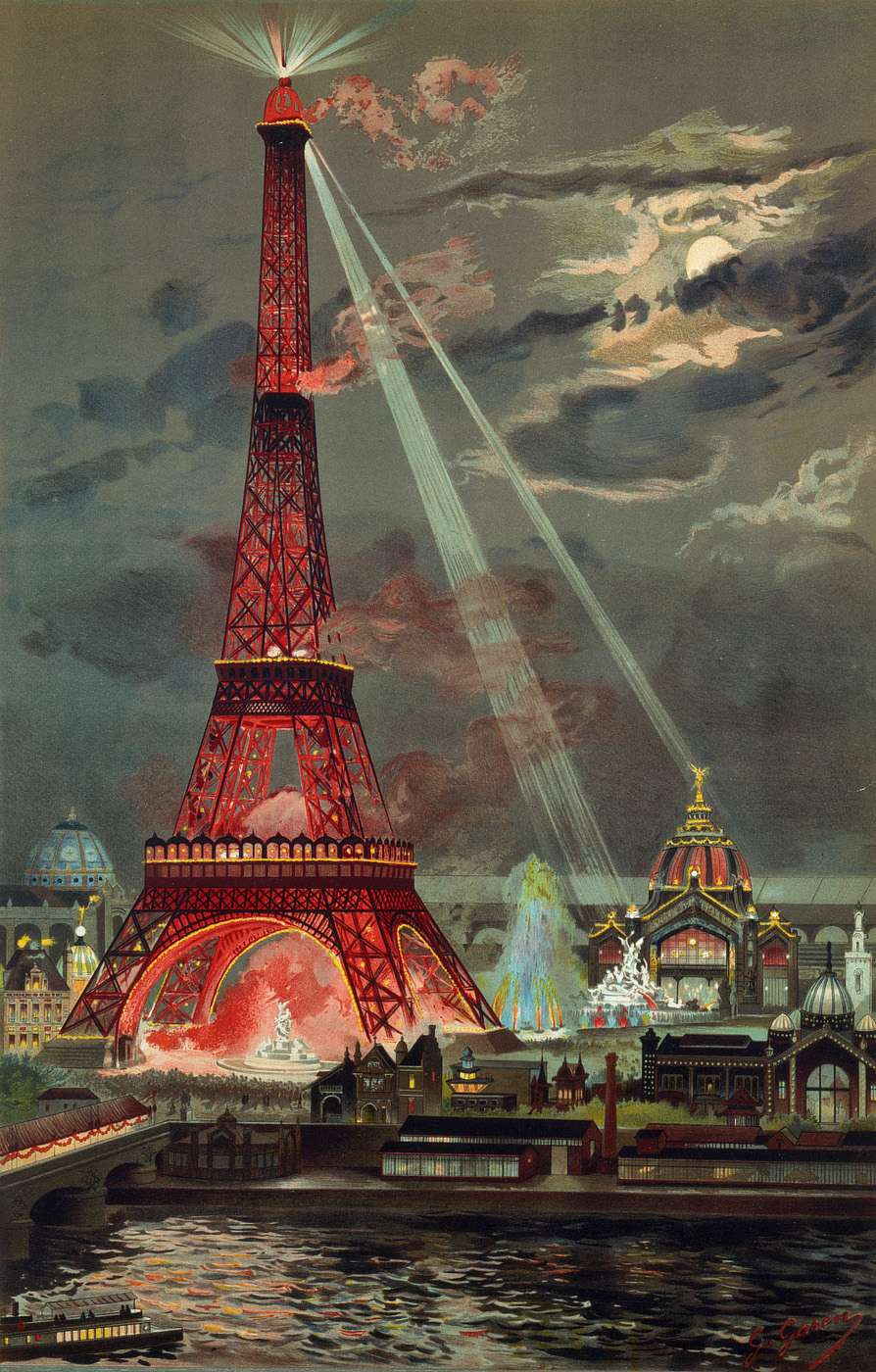
Chromolithograph of the Eiffel Tower illuminations in 1889

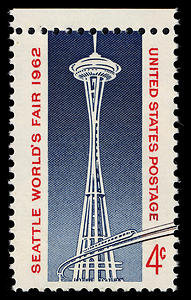
The Space Needle and Monorail depicted on this 1962 stamp

Most of the structures are temporary and are dismantled after the fair closes, except for landmark towers. By far the most famous of these is the Eiffel Tower, built for the Exposition Universelle (1889). Although it is now the most recognized symbol of its host city Paris, there were contemporary critics opposed to its construction, and demands for it to be dismantled after the fair's conclusion.

Other structures that remain from these fairs:

- 1851 – London: The Crystal Palace, from the first World's Fair in London, designed so that it could be recycled to recoup losses, was such a success that it was moved and intended to be permanent, only to be destroyed by a fire in 1936.
- 1876 – Philadelphia: The Centennial Exposition's main building, Memorial Hall, is still in Fairmount Park, Philadelphia, and serving as the new home for the Please Touch Museum. The space under the entrance to Memorial Hall houses a scale model of the entire Exposition.
- 1880 – Melbourne: The World Heritage–listed Royal Exhibition Building in Melbourne, constructed for the Melbourne International Exhibition.
- 1893 – Chicago: The Museum of Science and Industry in Chicago is housed in the former Palace of Fine Arts, one of the last remaining buildings of the World's Columbian Exposition. In conjunction with the fair, the Art Institute of Chicago building was built to house conferences, as the World's Congress Auxiliary Building. The Garden of the Phoenix, a remnant of the Japanese pavilion, also survives. Most Columbian structures burned soon after the exhibition, possibly the result of arson during the Pullman Strike. The foundation of the world's first Ferris Wheel, which operated at the Exposition, was unearthed on the Chicago Midway during a construction project by the University of Chicago, whose campus now surrounds the Midway. Relocated survivors include the Norway pavilion, a small house now at a museum in Wisconsin, and the Maine State Building, now at the Poland Springs Resort in Maine.
- 1894 – San Francisco: The Japanese Tea Garden in San Francisco's Golden Gate Park is the last major remnant of the California Midwinter International Exposition. Large ornamental wooden gates and a pagoda from the 1915 Panama–Pacific International Exposition were brought in after the latter fair closed, making the Tea Garden a rare if not unique instance of a survivor that incorporates architectural features from two completely separate fairs.
- 1897 – Nashville: A full-scale replica of the Parthenon was built for the Tennessee Centennial and International Exposition where it stands today in Nashville's Centennial Park. It features plaster reproductions of the Elgin Marbles and, in 1990, a re-creation of the original Athena Parthenos statue was installed inside just as it was in the original Parthenon in ancient Greece.
- 1900 – Paris: the Grand Palais and Petit Palais.
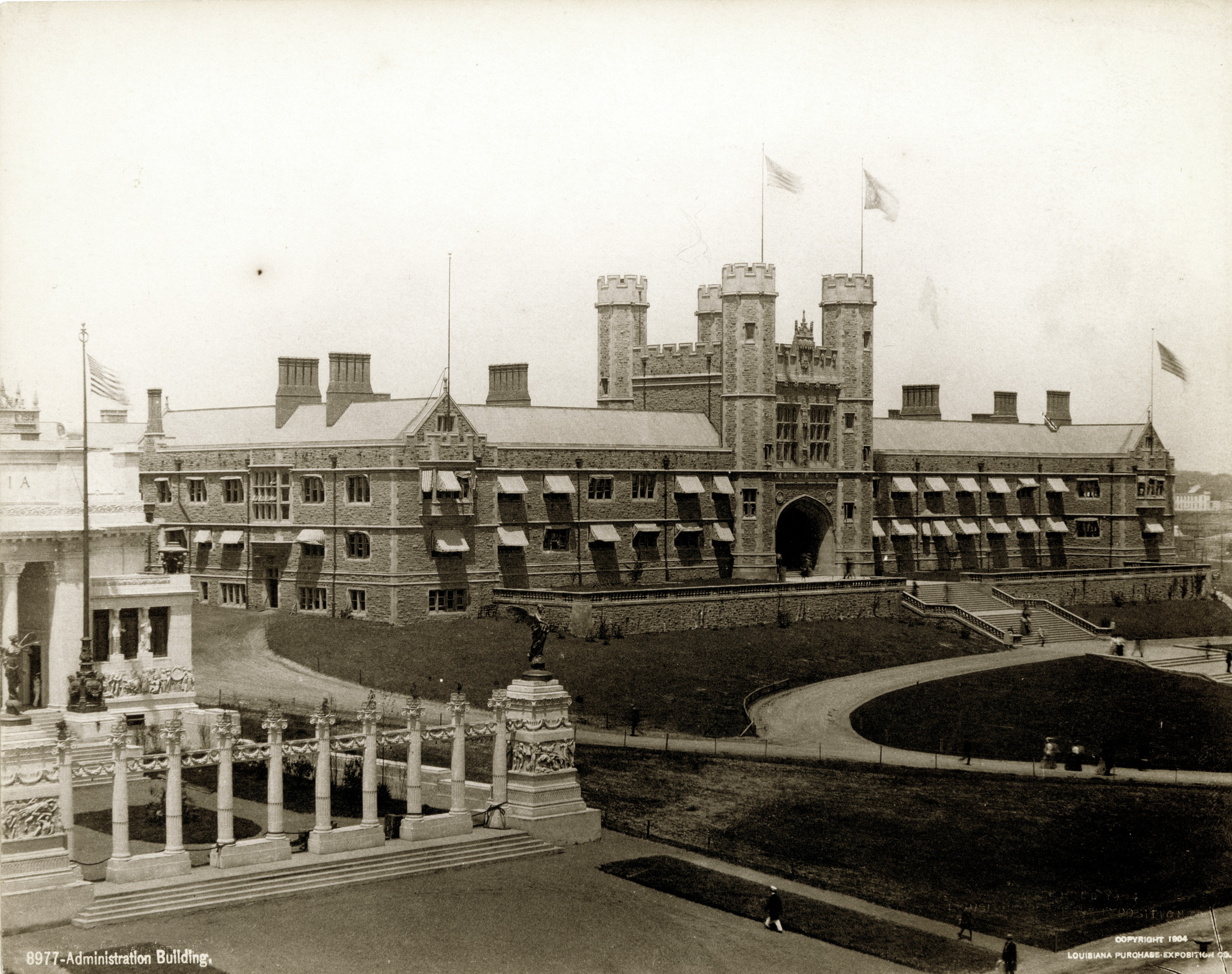
- Brookings Hall at Washington University in St. Louis, the administration building of the 1904 World's Fair
  1904 – St. Louis: The St. Louis Art Museum in Forest Park, originally the Palace of the Fine Arts, and Brookings Hall at Washington University in St. Louis, are remnants of the Louisiana Purchase Exposition (held a year late, as it was originally intended to be the centennial of the Louisiana Purchase. But organizers, and President Theodore Roosevelt, wanted the fair to be held during the Olympics which were moved from Chicago.), better known as the St. Louis World's Fair. The aviary in Forest Park gave root to the St. Louis Zoo.
- 1906 – Milan: The Civic Aquarium of Milan built for the Milan Exposition is still open after 100 years and was recently renovated. The International Commission on Occupational Health (ICOH) was settled in Milan during the fair and had its first congress in the Expo pavilions. In June 2006 the ICOH celebrated the first century of its life in Milan. An elevated railway with trains running at short intervals linked the fair to the city center. It was dismantled in the 1920s.
- 1909 – Seattle: The landscaping (by the Olmsted brothers) from the Alaska–Yukon–Pacific Exposition (AYPE) in Seattle still forms much of the University of Washington campus. The only major building left from the AYPE, Architecture Hall, is used by the university's architecture school.
- 1915 – San Francisco: The Palace of Fine Arts in San Francisco and its adjacent artificial lagoon are the only major remnants of the Panama–Pacific International Exposition still in their original locations on the former fairgrounds (now the city's Marina District neighborhood), but the building is almost entirely a reconstruction. The plaster-surfaced original, not intended to survive after the fair, was a crumbling ruin in 1964 when all but the steel framework was demolished so that it could be reproduced in concrete. The San Francisco Civic Auditorium, now the Bill Graham Civic Auditorium, is another major legacy of the fair but was built off-site in the city's Civic Center. The independent Panama–California Exposition in San Diego left a substantial legacy of permanent buildings and other structures which today define its site, San Diego's central Balboa Park, including the Prado walkway, the California Tower and Dome (now home to the Museum of Us), the 1,500-foot Cabrillo Bridge, the lily pond and botanical gardens, and the Spreckels Organ Pavilion.
- 1929 – Seville and Barcelona: much survives from the two simultaneous fairs Spain hosted that year. The most famous are the remnants of the Ibero-American Exposition in Seville, in which the Spanish Pavilion's Plaza de España forms part of a large park and forecourt. Most of that fair's pavilions have survived and been adapted for other uses, with many of them becoming consulates-general for the countries that built them. The Barcelona International Exposition featured the famous German pavilion designed by Mies van der Rohe, which was demolished but later rebuilt on the original site.
- 1936 – Johannesburg: The Empire Exhibition, South Africa was built close to the University of the Witwatersrand, and by the late 1970s the growth of the university was large enough to incorporate the permanent buildings from the exhibition. In 1985, the university purchased the South African Government Building; the two Heavy Machinery Halls, now called Empire Hall and the Dining Hall; the Hall of Transport; the Tower of Light; the Cape Dutch complex; and the Bien Donne Restaurant.
- 1939 – New York City: The New York City Building from the 1939's World Fair, was reused for the 1964 World's Fair and is now the Queens Museum. Parachute jump was a ride from the fair. It was moved to the Coney Island boardwalk in Brooklyn.
- 1942 – Rome: A special case is the EUR quarter in Rome, built for a World's Fair planned for 1942 but cancelled because of World War II. Today it hosts governmental and private offices, and several museums.
- 1958 – Brussels: In Brussels, the Atomium still stands at the exposition site. It is a 165-billion-times-enlarged iron-crystal-shaped building. Until June 2012, the "American Theatre" on the Expo grounds was frequently used as a television studio by the VRT.

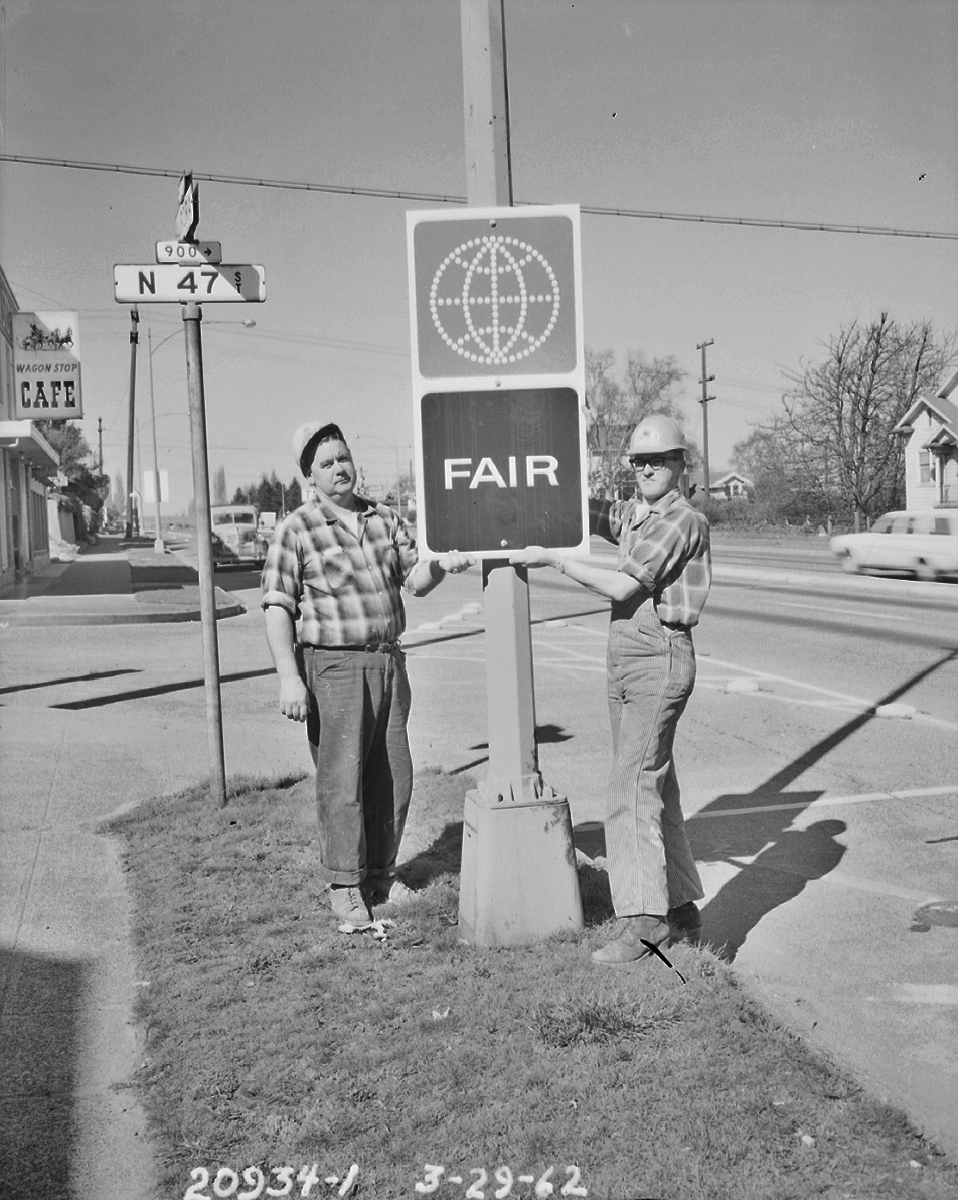
Seattle – World's Fair sign at 47th and Aurora, 1962

- 1962 – Seattle: The Space Needle theme building of the Century 21 Exposition commonly known as the Seattle World's Fair still stands as a Seattle icon and landmark. The Seattle Center Monorail, the other widely known futuristic feature of the fair, still operates daily. The US pavilion became the Pacific Science Center. The original exterior and roof of the Washington State Pavilion has been preserved as a landmark, and now is part of Climate Pledge Arena.

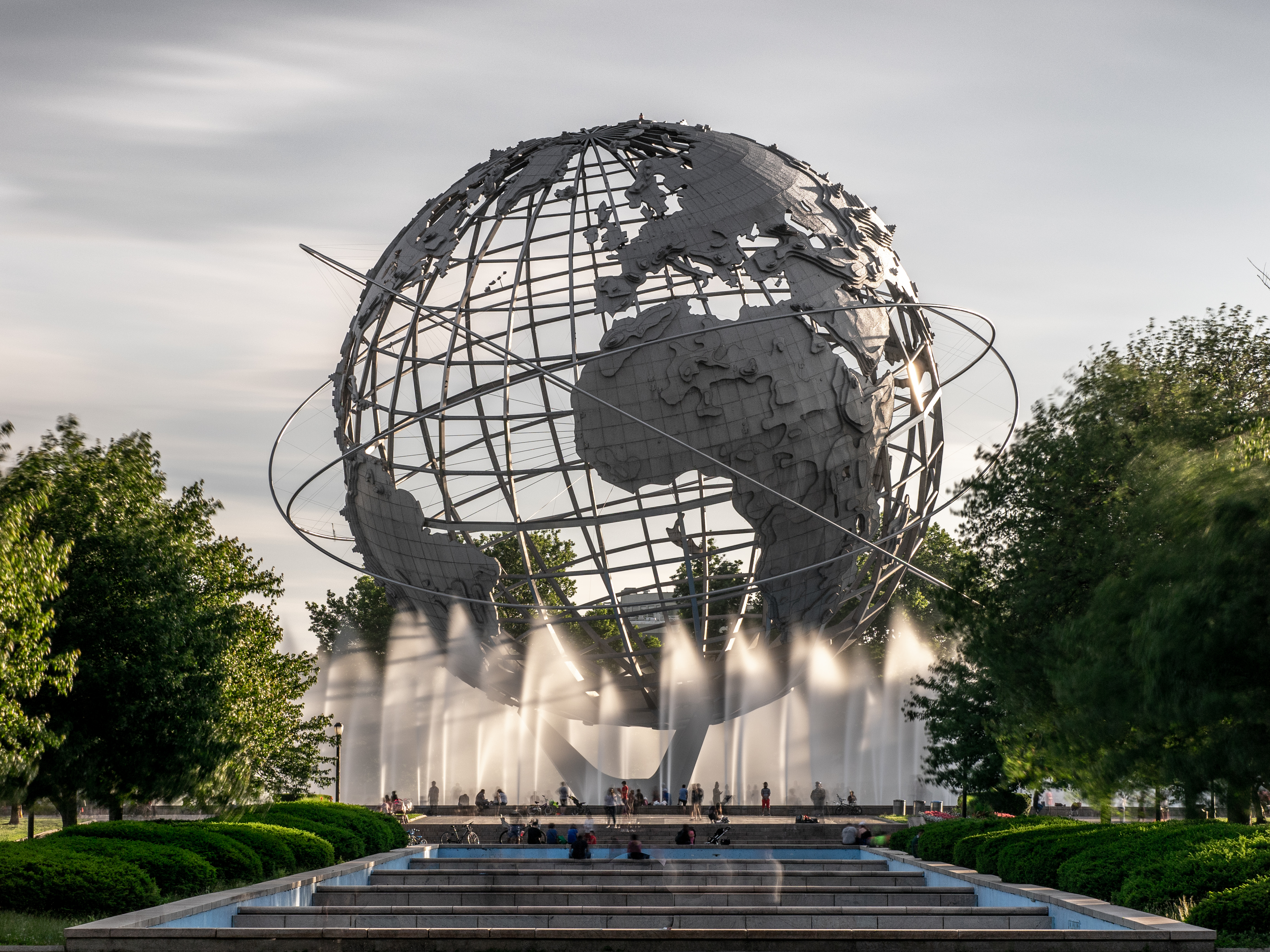
The Unisphere, from the 1964 World's Fair in New York City, in the 21st century

- 1964 – New York City: many structures still stand
  - The Unisphere, built for the second New York World's Fair, stands on its original site in Flushing Meadows, Queens
  - New York Hall of Science, built for the fair, continues to operate as a science museum, similar to its original role
  - The Port Authority Heliport and Exhibit is now the Terrace on the Park event and catering venue
  - The New York State Pavilion is mostly derelict, but is still an icon, with its observation towers prominently featured in 1997's Men in Black. The Theaterama building is the only portion still maintained, and is used by the Queens Theater. The Tent of Tomorrow building and observation towers are being restored as of 2019.
  - The New York City Pavilion, a holdover from the 1939 fair, continues to serve as the home of the Queens Museum
  - Other artifacts remain throughout the park, and many buildings were transported for use elsewhere and continue to function.
- 1967 – Montreal: Among the structures still standing from Expo 67 in Montreal are Moshe Safdie's Habitat 67, Buckminster Fuller's American pavilion the "Montreal Biosphere", the Jamaica Pavilion, the Tunisia Pavilion, and the French pavilion (now the Montreal Casino).
- 1968 – San Antonio: San Antonio kept the Tower of the Americas and the Convention Center from HemisFair '68.
- 1970 – Osaka: The Tower of the Sun was left standing, but was neglected after the conclusion of the Expo '70. After restoration to the structure was completed, the museum inside the tower was re-opened on 18 March 2018.
- 1974 – Spokane: Spokane still has its Riverfront Park that was created for Expo '74—the park remains a popular and iconic part of Spokane's downtown.

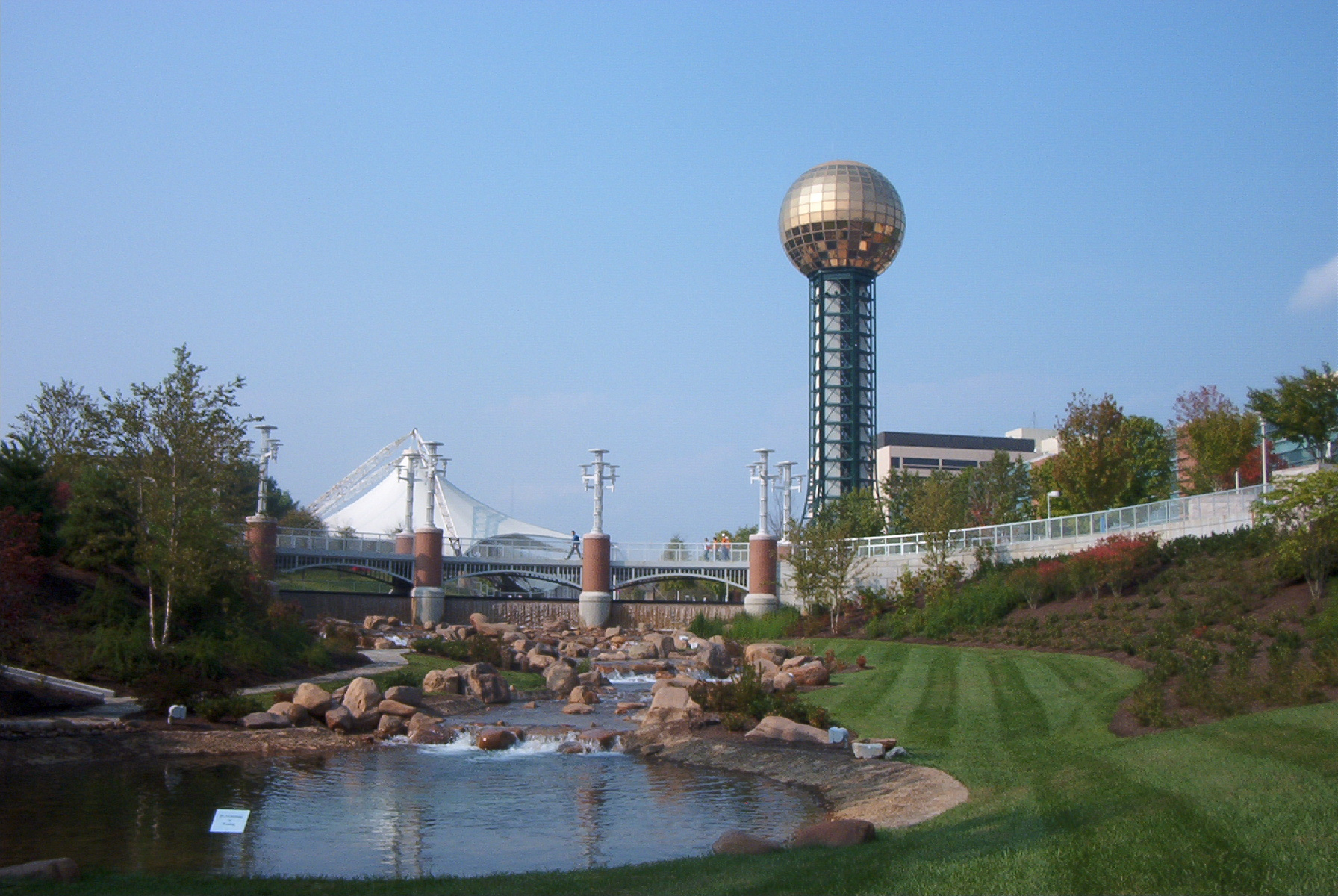
View of 1982 fairgrounds, with the Sunsphere

- 1982 – Knoxville: The Sunsphere from the Knoxville World's Fair remains as a feature of Knoxville's skyline.
- 1984 – New Orleans: The main pavilions of the 1984 New Orleans World's Fair became the Ernest N. Morial Convention Center, which is also known for its use as a shelter of last resort during Hurricane Katrina and later hosted the Miss Universe in 2022.
- 1986 – Vancouver: In Vancouver, many Expo 86 projects were designed as legacy projects. Of note are the Skytrain, Science World and Canada Place.
- 1988 – Brisbane: The Skyneedle, the symbol tower of Expo '88 in Brisbane, Queensland, Australia, still stands. Other survivors are the Nepalese Peace Pagoda of the Nepalese representation, now at the transformed World Expo '88 site South Bank Parklands, and the Japan Pond and Garden from the Japanese representation, now at the Brisbane Mount Cooth-tha Botanic Gardens. In 2018 the World Expo 88 Art Trail was re-birthed and dramatically expanded as part of the 30th Anniversary of World expo 88, now forming a Major tourist attraction in its own right.
- 1992 – Seville: The pavilions of Expo '92 in Seville had been converted into a technological square and a theme park.
- 1998 – Lisbon: The main buildings of Expo '98 in Lisbon were completely integrated into the city itself and many of the art exhibition pieces still remain.
- 2005 – Nagoya: The home of Satsuki & Mei Kusakabe, built for the 2005 Expo in Aichi, remains operating at its original site in Morikoro Park and is a popular tourist attraction, eventually being incorporated into Ghibli Park in 2022.

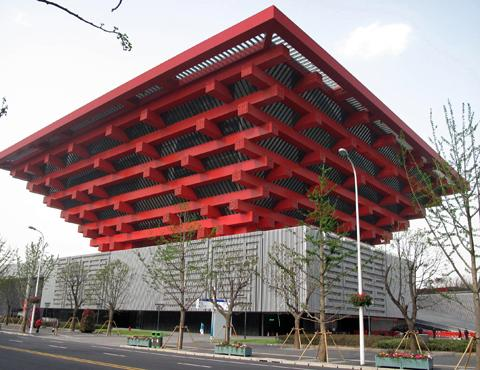
The China pavilion at the Expo 2010; repurposed as a museum

- 2010 – Shanghai: The China pavilion from Expo 2010 in Shanghai, the largest display in the history of the World Expo, is now the China Art Museum, the largest art museum in Asia.
- 2015 – Milan: The Italian Pavilion of Expo 2015 remains on the original site.

=== Reuse of sites ===
Some world's fair sites became (or reverted to) parks incorporating some of the expo elements, such as:

- Audubon Park, New Orleans: Site of New Orleans's World Cotton Centennial in 1884
- Jackson Park, Chicago and the Chicago Midway: Site of the 1893 Columbian Exposition
- Centennial Park, Nashville: Tennessee Centennial Expo in 1897
- Forest Park, Saint Louis: Home of the Saint Louis Louisiana Purchase Exposition of 1904
- San Diego: Panama–California Exposition (1915) and California Pacific International Exposition (1935)
- Seattle Center: Century 21 Exposition in 1962
- Flushing Meadows Park, Queens, New York City: Site of both the 1939 New York World's Fair and the 1964 New York World's Fair
- Montreal: Expo 67
- San Antonio: HemisFair '68
- Expo Commemoration Park, Osaka: Expo '70
- Riverfront Park, Spokane: Expo '74
- World's Fair Park, Knoxville: 1982 World's Fair
- Vancouver: Expo 86
- Brisbane: Expo '88: now represented with the South Bank Parklands
- Seville: Expo '92
- Daejeon (Taejŏn): Expo '93
- Lisbon: Expo '98 was divided into several structures: Pavilhão Atlântico, Casino Lisboa, Oceanário and Pavilhão do Conhecimento.
- Shanghai Expo Park: Expo 2010
- Rho, Milan, Lombardy District: Expo 2015

=== Relocation of pavilions ===
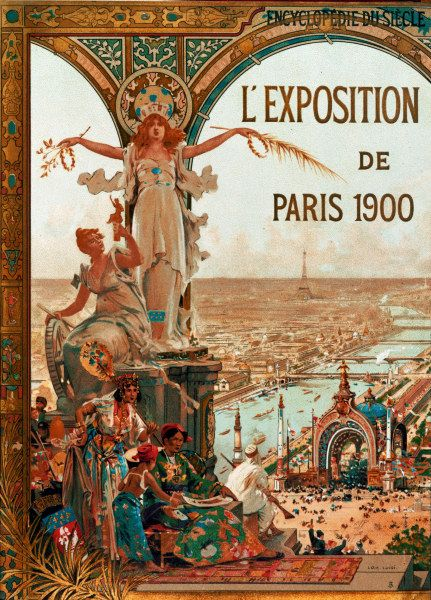
Poster for the 1900 expo

Some pavilions have been transported overseas intact:

- The Argentine Pavilion from the 1889 Paris was relocated to Buenos Aires, Argentina until its demolition in 1932.
- The Chilean Pavilion from 1889 Paris is now in Santiago, Chile, and following significant refurbishment in 1992 functions as the Museo Artequin
- The Peruvian Pavilion from 1900 Paris was partially rebuilt in Lima, as home to the Military Academy of History.
- The Japanese Tower of the 1900 World's Fair in Paris was relocated to Laken (Brussels) on request of King Leopold II of Belgium.
- The Belgium Pavilion from the 1939 New York World's Fair was relocated to Virginia Union University in Richmond, Virginia.
- The USSR Pavilion from Expo 67 is now in Moscow.
- The Sanyo Pavilion from Expo '70 is the Asian Centre at the University of British Columbia in Vancouver.
- The Portugal Pavilion from Expo 2000 is now in Coimbra, Portugal.
- The United Arab Emirates Pavilion from Expo 2010 is now in Saadiyat Island in Abu Dhabi in UAE
- The Bahrain Pavilion from Expo 2015 was relocated to Bahrain. The Azerbaijan Pavilion is in that country's capital Baku. The Chinese Pavilion was brought back to Qingdao and is on the site of the 2014 horticultural exhibition.
- The Save the Children Italy pavilion from Expo 2015 was dismantled and re-built as school for Syrian refugee children in Lebanon.

The Brussels Expo '58 relocated many pavilions within Belgium: the pavilion of Jacques Chocolats moved to the town of Diest to house the new town swimming pool. Another pavilion was relocated to Willebroek and has been used as dance hall Carré ever since. One smaller pavilion still stands on the boulevard towards the Atomium: the restaurant "Salon 58" in the pavilion of Comptoir Tuilier.

=== Other legacies ===
Many exhibitions and rides created by Walt Disney and his WED Enterprises company for the 1964 New York World's Fair (which was held over into 1965) were moved to Disneyland after the closing of the Fair. Many of the rides, including "It's a Small World", and "Great Moments with Mr. Lincoln", as well as the building that housed the Carousel of Progress, are still in operation. The concept of a permanent world's fair came to fruition with the Disney Epcot theme park at the Walt Disney World Resort, near Orlando, Florida. Epcot has many characteristics of a typical universal exposition: national pavilions and exhibits concerning technology and/or the future, along with more typical amusement park rides. Meanwhile, several of the 1964 attractions that were relocated to Disneyland have been duplicated at the Walt Disney World Resort.

Occasionally other mementos of the fairs remain. In the New York City Subway system, signs directing people to Flushing Meadows–Corona Park remain from the 1964–1965 event. In the Montreal Metro subway at least one tile artwork of its theme, "Man and His World", remains.

== See also ==
- Agricultural show
- International Textile Machinery Association exhibition
- State fair
- Great Exhibition
