= Helsingborg Exhibition 1955 =

1955 Hälsingborg
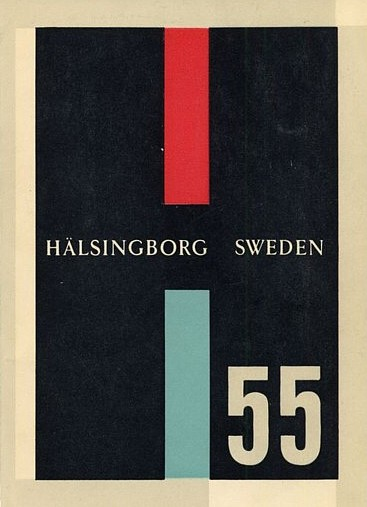
- exhibition poster

Overview
- BIE-class: Specialized exposition
- Name: Helsingborgsutställningen
- Area: 11 acres
- Invention(s): Tetra Pak

Participant(s)
- Countries: 10

Location
- Country: Sweden
- City: Hälsingborg
- Venue: Parapeten
- Coordinates: 56°02′44.6″N 12°41′10.8″E

Timeline
- Awarded: November 4, 1954
- Opening: June 10, 1955
- Closure: August 28, 1955

Specialized expositions
- Previous: The International Exhibition of Navigation (1954) in Naples
- Next: Exhibition of citriculture in Beit Dagan

Universal
- Previous: Exposition internationale du bicentenaire de Port-au-Prince in Port-au-Prince
- Next: Expo 58 in Brussels

Simultaneous
- Specialized: The International Expo of Sport (1955)

Helsingborg exhibition of 1955, also known as H55, was a BIE recognised world's fair held in Helsingborg, Sweden held between 10 June and 28 August 1955.

A total of nine nations were represented at the exhibition: Denmark, Finland, France, Japan, Norway, Sweden, Switzerland, United Kingdom, and West Germany.

Its theme was arts and crafts, with an aim of showing how modern design could be used in commercial as well as luxury goods. Exhibitors came from 10 countries with items including Nisse Strinning's String design bookshelf

Still standing in Helsingborg from the exhibition are the Concert Hall, Parapet Restaurant, and Bar 55.
