= Making the desert bloom =

Phrase associated with Zionism

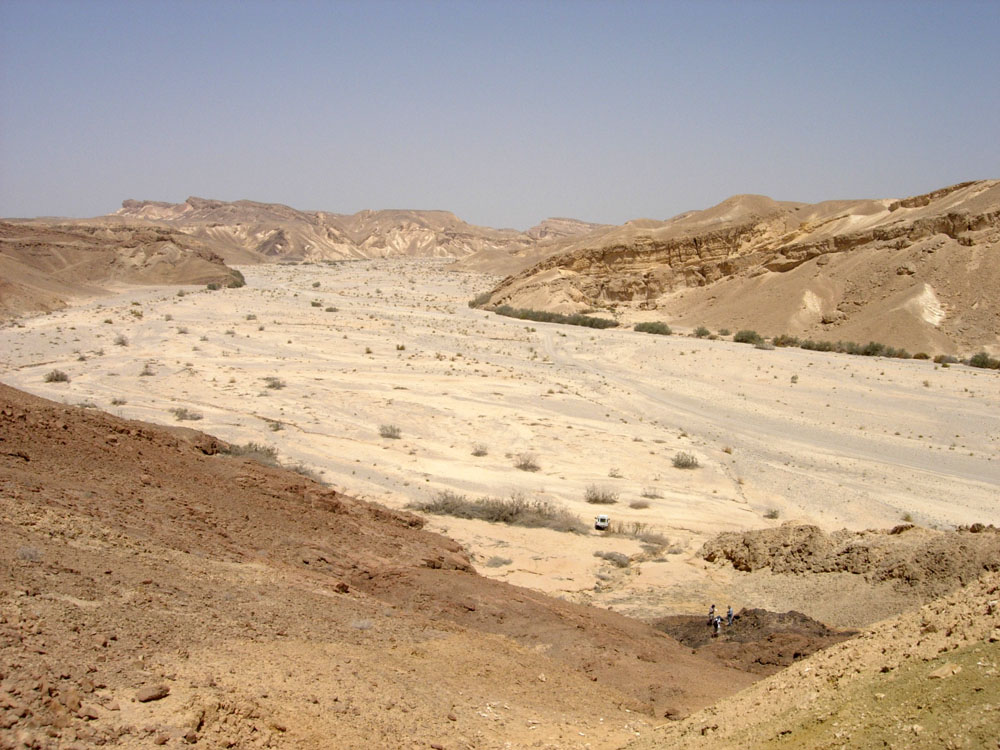
The Negev Desert in Southern Israel.

Making the desert bloom is a Zionist slogan. It often refers to Israeli afforestation and agricultural projects.

== Background ==
The Levant has long had settled agriculture, being a part of the Fertile Crescent. Crop domestication is said to have arisen in the Southern Levant around 11,000 BCE. Under the Ottoman Empire, Palestine operated under the musha’ system, which relied on a clan structure to rotate plots based on soil fertility and other natural factors to ensure an equivalency based on quality of the earth. After the Land Code of 1858, communal rights continued to be enabled by the existence of miri land, which allowed the release of land from the Ottoman government to be formally owned by a clan's sheik and worked by fellahin.

The climate of the Levant is varied and includes the marshes and scrublands of Mediterranean zones (dry, hot summers with short, rainy winters), the Steppes, the desert, consisting of the Negev and Judean Desert, and lastly tropical microclimates inside the Judean Desert. Most of the endemic flora in these areas of the Levant, aside from crops like cereals, olives and citrus, are in the form of forests, Lotus and herbaceous vegetation, and shrubs. Around 47.6% of the land is arable. By 1945, 30% of land was cultivated by around 60% of the rural, non-nomadic Palestinian population.

== First usage ==
The phrase has been used in reference to Israel since at least the '50s. Ben Gurion, the first Prime Minister of Israel, stated in a 1951 address to the Knesset: "We will not be faithful to one of the two central goals of the state - making the wilderness bloom - if we make do with only the needs of the hour […] We are a state at the beginning of repairing the corruption of generations, corruption which was done to the nation and corruption which was done to the land."

A notable early usage of the term is traced back to 1969, when former Israeli Prime Minister Levi Eshkol said in an interview: “What are the Palestinians? When I came here there were 250,000 non-Jews, mainly Arabs and Bedouins. It was desert. More than underdeveloped. Nothing. It was only after we made the desert bloom that they became interested in taking it from us.”

== Ideological basis ==
=== Depictions of pre-Zionist landscape and agriculture ===
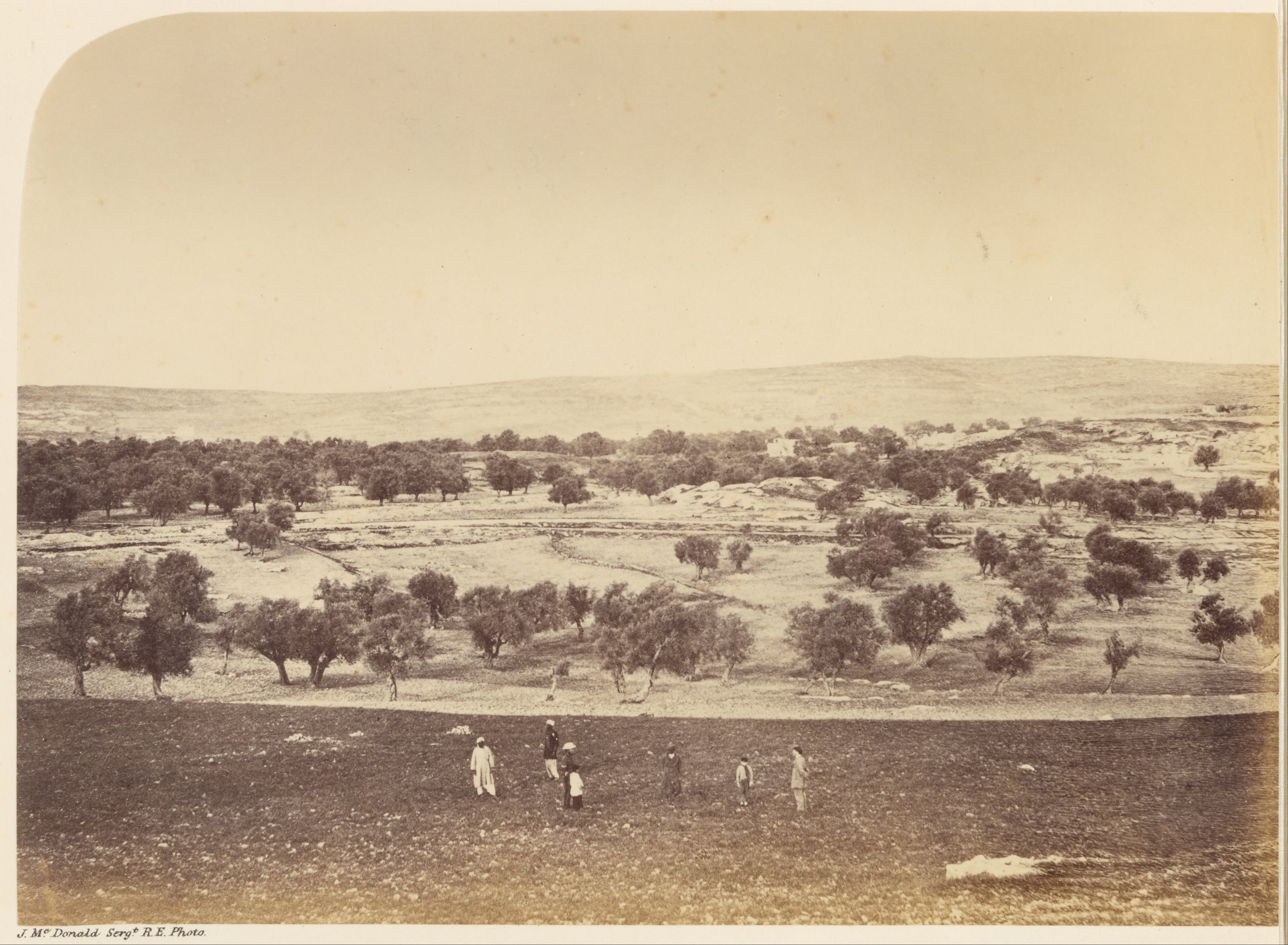
Outside of Jerusalem, 1865.

In the 18th and 19th centuries, Western Asia and North Africa became associated with aridity and emptiness in the West, wrongly believed to be desiccation caused over time by humans, especially nomadic communities. The Levant in particular was described by many foreign visitors to the area as desolate and untillable.

40 years earlier, Mark Twain provided an account of the scenery on the way to Jerusalem in his humorous travel book, The Innocents Abroad:

We traversed some miles of desolate country whose soil is rich enough, but is given over wholly to weeds—a silent, mournful expanse, wherein we saw only three persons—Arabs ... The further we went the hotter the sun got, and the more rocky and bare, repulsive and dreary the landscape became. There could not have been more fragments of stone strewn broadcast over this part of the world ... There was hardly a tree or a shrub any where. Even the olive and the cactus, those fast friends of a worthless soil, had almost deserted the country. No landscape exists that is more tiresome to the eye than that which bounds the approaches to Jerusalem.

Twain's book became a best-seller and painted the Levant's landscape to many in the Anglophone world as overwhelmingly dry and inhospitable. Archelogist Michael Press notes how Twain's depictions continue to be a point of reference for contemporary Israeli society in contrast to the afforestation and agriculture projects undertaken in present times, being mentioned by those like Benjamin Netanyahu and Alan Dershowitz.

Ahad Ha'am, in an 1891 article called Truth from Eretz Israel, spoke conversely of cultivation and vegetation within Palestine:

From abroad, we are accustomed to believe that Eretz Israel is presently almost totally desolate, a uncultivated desert, and that anyone wishing to buy land there can come and buy all he wants. But in truth that is not so. In the entire land, it is hard to find tillable land that is not already tilled [...] Not the peasants alone, but the owners of large properties as well, do not easily part with good land that has no drawbacks. Many of our people who came to buy land have been in Eretz Israel for months, and have toured its length and width, without finding what they seek.

In this piece, he also repudiated the common claim that those living there, cultivating the land, did so mindlessly: "From abroad we are accustomed to believing that the Arabs are all desert savages, like donkeys, who neither see nor understand what goes on around them. But this is a big mistake. The Arab, like all children of Shem, has a sharp intellect and is very cunning."

=== Halutz and Jewish labor ===
The ideological basis for this phrase is rooted in the concept of the halutz. Early Zionism, as the negation of the diaspora, held the stance that Jews living in Eastern Europe had become weakened, culturally inferior, and rootless due their unsettled position between assimilation and anti-antisemitism and thus, required the creation of a nation for Jews. In an attempt to reverse this "rootless cosmopolitan" state, the halutz, or the pioneering Jewish laborer who works the land, was born as a means to foster the "muscular Jew." It was believed that principally Jewish labor could transform the land and that principally agricultural labor could transform the Jewish people.

== In practice ==
=== Afforestation ===
The key actor in the afforestation of the region was the Jewish National Fund (JNF). Since 1901, they have planted over 250 million trees, developed 250,000 acres of land, and established over 1,000 parks. The JNF purposefully chose Aleppo pine, as well as cypress and eucalyptus, as a tree that would work reasonably well with the climate and be familiar for the European Jewish population, thereby "beautifying" the land. By 1960, 85% of all trees planted by the JNF were coniferous. Later on, realizing they needed to diversify the forests, the JNF invested in other coniferous species, like Turkish pine and Stone pine, as well as deciduous and other species, like carobs, acacia, tamarisk, and palms. As of 2008, 44% of the trees in Israel are pine, and endemic plants make up only 11% of forests.

=== Kibbutzim ===
The concept of Halutzim manifested in the form of kibbutzim and the kibbutz system became a means of connecting the new Jewish population who had come in the second and third aliyah to the land. The first kibbutz was established in 1910. By the time World War II broke out, there were 79 kibbutzim, consisting of 24,105 people and in 1950, the number had almost tripled with around 65,000 kibbutznikim. The kibbutz movement peaked in 1989, with a population of around 129,000. A large portion of kibbutznikim were young students.

The kibbutzim also became a way for the expansion of settlements. Early on, Mizrahi Jews were often placed at the peripheral of Zionist settlements, sometimes leading to conflict caused by coerced placement there. It also saw the inclusion of women in quasi-manual labor jobs such as in tree nurseries, which also were often placed at the peripheries, pushing for expansion.

=== Water technology ===
Innovations in water technologies began before the establishment of the state of Israel in 1948, beginning with the creation of the company Mekorot in 1937. In the following decades after its creation, Mekorot would develop numerous project in water technology, including cloud seeding and the construction of pipelines and wastewater treatment plants. By the '50s, water as a resource was nationalized and entrusted to the state. Since the 2000s, Israel has begun to invest in desalination projects, which makes up around 60-80% of Israel's drinking water. It has also become a major proponent of drip irrigation, making major strides in the technology in the '60s.

With the ongoing water crisis in the area, Israel sells millions of cubic meters of water and billions of dollars' worth of agricultural products annually to its neighbors Jordan and Palestine. Claims over water sources has played a major role in numerous conflicts between Israel and its neighbor states, including the War over Water, the Six-Day War (and the following occupation of the Golan Heights), and a few other more minor conflicts.

== Criticism ==
The phrase "making the desert bloom" as well as the implementation of various Israeli afforestation and agricultural/water technology projects have been critiqued by various organizations.

The term has been criticized by anti-Zionists as playing into the Orientalist idea that Western Asian and North African countries are uncivilized until Western interference. Up until the 1990s, many Zionists held the opinion that there was degradation of the land that was due to the backwardness of Palestinians. Some, such as UC Davis professor of history Diana K. Davis and Palestinian climate activist Manal Shqair, have argued that the idea of "making the desert bloom" devalues land that is minimally productive.

== See also ==
- Conquest of the Desert (exhibition)
- Category:Oases of Israel
- Category:Oases of Jordan
- Cedars of God
- Desert greening
- Desertification
- History of agriculture in Palestine
- Jaffa orange
- Oasification
- Rainwater harvesting in the Sahel
- Isaiah 35 § Verse 1
