= Mawat land =

Ottoman land code defining land belonging to the state

Mevat land or mawat land ("dead land"; Turkish: arazi-i mevat; Arabic: أراضي مَوات, romanized: 'aradi mawat) was an Ottoman legal category of land that had been declared unusable or unused state land. The legal system of management of such land was formalized in the Ottoman Land Code of 1858. The Ottomans had several difficulties implementing this management. They attempted to completing a complete cadastral survey and enforce the preservation of state land, but faced manpower shortages, and local courts were more "flexible" in their rulings than Ottoman law permitted, leading to the 1874 Mulk Titles Act, which attempted to centralize land ownership registration and changes in land re-categorization.

After the fall of the Ottoman Empire at the end of World War I, the British administration of the Palestinian Mandate made some modifications to the land laws, including discontinuing the ability to gain control over land through its cultivation without prior approval from a representative of the state.

When Israel was founded, it took over pre-existing state land, and discontinued the earlier "flexibility" shown to the Bedouins of the Negev and, based on the mawat status of the land, moved many Negev Bedouins into the Siyag region of the Negev, which is part of a longer-term trend toward sedentism.

== History ==
=== Origins: Ottoman period ===
==== Historic context and legal innovations ====
A distinctive feature of the Ottoman Empire was that it had many unstable border regions in the south, as these were inhabited by various nomadic and semi-nomadic tribes, such as the Bedouins, Kurds, or Turkomans. In the 1830s there was a brief conquest of Ottoman Palestine by the Egyptians. Also, in this period, the tribes in the northerly border regions increasingly gained power and threatened to secede.

It was in this context that the Ottomans enacted a series of reforms from 1839 to 1876 called Tanzimat, which, among other goals, sought to stabilize the border regions of their empire through sedentarization of the inhabitants of border areas by enforcing continuous farming of their lands. The Ottomans passed the Ottoman Land Code of 1858, which detailed laws involving the mawat legal category.

The key innovations of the Ottoman Land Code of 1958 were: (1) While in traditional Islamic law the permission of a tribal leader or the state was required to develop unused state land ("miri") and thereby acquire usufruct rights to the now-productive land, the Land Code now even "rewarded" unauthorized land development: land that had been made productive could be retroactively registered in the so-called "tapu registers" for a registration fee, after which it automatically became something similar to the private property of the farmer (Gerber: "private for all practical purposes [...] though formally belonging to the state"). (2) However, this land had to be continuously cultivated. If cultivation was neglected for more than three years, the owner risked losing the land. Although the state could not reclaim it and later re-classify it as mawat land (Tute: "once miri always miri"), it could classify it as "mahlul", a sub-category of miri land, and demand that the owner pay the registration fee again. If he failed to do so, the state could auction off the land, but had itself "no power of resuming it."

==== Legal practice ====
In Ottoman Palestine, through at least the 1920s, there were multiple difficulties in the implementation of the Ottoman Land Code related to the tracking of land ownership.

- One of the goals of the Land Code was to create an authoritative reference of land ownership (i.e., a Torrens title system) called "Tapu", but "legislative compulsion to register [was] habitually and widely disregarded".
- The Land Code also established a taxation system, called "werko" that funded local government, and hence operated independently of the Tapu, at least initially. Even when they became better coordinated, large discrepancies between the two systems remained.
- Civil and Sharia courts regularly labeled miri land as mulk, leading to the passage of the Mulk Titles Act of 1874 which made illegal the practice of considering as prima facie authoritative the Sharia registration of land as being mulk. Instead, it required a ferman (i.e., decree issued by the sovereign) to demonstrate ownership.
- The Land Code included a communal system of land cultivation (musha land), in which land was periodically redistributed among the heads of prominent families within a tribe. Centralized record-keeping systems sometimes assigned ownership to the heads of the cultivating families, or gave fractional shares to many members. Despite complicated inter-family agreements and patterns of inheritance, central records could be left for generations without update, as long as the land remained with the same controlling families.

The structured registration of current land holdings by "yoklama tapu" commissions proceeded around the Empire at a slow but steady pace, as the reforms were enacted over decades. In the rural areas of the southern Palestine district of Hebron, the first Ottoman land-tax register from 1876 shows that, from village to village, structures, residences, and farmlands were overwhelmingly registered and taxes paid, throughout the district. Furthermore, a review of Ottoman Shari'a court documents shows that land transactions were also frequently recorded in the Hebron courts, both before and after land reforms. These court documents were accepted by the Ottoman land-reform commissions as validation of ownership, showing how regional actors and local officials cooperated with the Ottomans authorities.

Toward the end of the Ottoman period, Ottoman legal practice in the Negev was flexible toward the Bedouins. Not only tapu entries, but also "tax records, oral testimony, and sharia-court documents" were considered "sufficient to prove property tenure." In fact, the Bedouin in the Negev were largely autonomous, due to the Ottomans not having manpower to effectively govern the Negev.

The Ottomans also adopted a flexible approach in Syria. Officially, the government claimed ultimate legal title to the land, and cultivation was the "basis for acquiring rights to the land". But in practice, authority over pastoral land was conferred to tribes grazing their herds there on the basis of the strengths of the tribes compared to other tribes, rather than on the basis of written history. This flexible approach could also be haphazard: a nomad wishing to settle on apparently unclaimed ("free") land and begin cultivating it could face challenges from tribal chiefs claiming previous occupation, or from someone holding a tapu, whether real or forged.

Alongside the aforementioned Council of State decision, several factors demonstrate that the Ottoman government did not consider the Negev as mawat, but rather regarded it as Bedouin land even without formal registration: they continued to levy land tax on Bedouin agricultural land, and they purchased land from Bedouins to establish the city of Beersheba.

=== Mandatory Palestine ===
==== Legal innovations ====
The Mandate for Palestine came under British administration, first as an administrative territory from 1920 to 1923, then as the Mandatory Palestine from 1923 to 1948. The British High Commissioner Herbert Samuel, "alarm[ed] over the apparent 'loss' of land to peasant farmers bringing seemingly unoccupied land under cultivation," sought to "[bring] as much land as possible into the hands of the state, so as to 'build up and protect the public interest'" as well as to interpret the Ottoman laws in a way to "suit Zionist purposes," in accord with the Mandate for Palestine. Particularly through two decrees, Palestinians land rights were restricted.

First, the Mahlul Land Ordinance of 1920 restricted the rights of heirs to miri land and of squatters on miri land not claimed by heirs (="mahlul"), which, during Ottoman times, could be acquired in a similar way to mawat land. Second, the Mawat Land Ordinance of 1921 removed their right to develop mawat land without prior approval from state authorities.

The 1921 law was an important turning point in defining the legal concept of mawat lands. Until then the mawat classification was for lands of marginal agricultural importance located outside the main areas of settlement. The possibility to gain title by cultivation that existed under the Land Code had encouraged improvement and the enlargement of settlements in sparsely populated areas. The 1946 Survey of Palestine by John Valentine Wistar Shaw described the change from mawat lands: "Nowadays, the development of 'waste' land without prior leave from the State is legally a trespass." The only way to gain title to the mawat (and mahlul) lands after 1921 was "allocation from the State."

In the 1920s, mawat and mahlul lands became central instruments for the British to transfer land from Palestinians to incoming Zionist settlers. Under the Ottomans, Sultan Abdul Hamid still had to use his private funds to purchase land specifically to settle Bedouins, as mawat lands were public lands, and Ottoman law prevented the state from freely disposing of mahlul lands (see above). In contrast, the British reinterpreted mawat, mahlul, and miri lands as akin to state land and leased them at their discretion: despite Jews making up only a little over 17% of the population by the late 1920s, by 1943 — after the British had already begun to scale back their land redistribution policies due to the growing issue of Palestinian landlessness — nearly 73.5% of state lands leased by the British went to Jews (with 98.6% of that under long-term leases and only 1.4% under short-term leases), while only 26.5% went to Arabs (of which 1.9% were long-term leases and 98.1% were short-term leases).

==== Legal practice ====
Registered state lands as of 1947. The map marks only five areas in the Negev as state lands, all purchased during the Ottoman period. With note: "There are, particularly in the southern desert [...], [additional] lands – not coloured on this map – which will no doubt be found at land settlement to be public land." In the Survey of Palestine, low British estimates excluded around 200,000 ha of Negev lands "cultivated from time to time" from this possibly public land. The remainder was thought to be probably "either mewat or empty miri land."

Despite these legal changes, their practical implementation faced significant challenges. Although the two decrees were designed and suitable to dispossess Palestinians quickly, they were "practically never" applied. Key reasons for the failure of these legal innovations included strong resistance from the Palestinian population, and more critically, the British, lacking knowledge of land ownership due to the previous failure of Ottoman land registrations, faced further difficulties when outraged Palestinians refused to cooperate with the newly established registration commission. As a result, the commission struggled to gather necessary information. The Bedouin-held lands in the Negev were still entirely unregistered when the Arab-Israeli War began in 1948; the only 6,400 ha of land in the Negev were registered to Arabs during the British Mandate. Furthermore, even after identifying lands that were potentially to be classified as mawat or mahlul, the new regulations still required prove that they had not been cultivated for three years. This evidence was often undermined by Palestinians, who, likely due to "gentleman agreements," frequently testified to the contrary.

External image
- Affirmation "not to interfere with the special rights and customs of the Bedouin Tribes of Beersheba", given during the British land registration process.

More relevant specifically to the Negev is that, although attempts were made to analyze which lands could be classified as mawat, the British — who were determined not to cede the Negev to the Zionists — adopted the Ottoman position, according to which traditional Bedouin land laws prevailed in the Negev. Accordingly, they declared that the Bedouins' "special rights and customs" were not affected by the aforementioned new ordinances. A year later, Article 45 of the Palestine Order in Council confirmed the Tribal Court of the Bedouins, which had already been established by the Ottomans and regulated matters in the Beersheba district according to Bedouin Tribal Law. In a 1929 court ruling, it was further affirmed that this court had jurisdiction over cases involving land in Beersheba that was not formally registered. On this note, the 1931 Palestine Census also stated:

In a strict sense most of the land [in the Negev] may be described as mewat, not having been assigned or disposed of by deed. Nevertheless, the 'privileges' of the nomads have been confirmed from time to time, and it is, undoubtedly, part of the 'customary' law, as opposed to formal law, to recognize the nomadic traditional cultivation in this area as a normal assignment.

— Census of Palestine 1931, 1933

Additionally, the British built on the fact that the Ottoman Land Code provided for the possibility that "vacant land [...], such as mountains, rocky places, [...] grazing grounds, which are [...] assigned ab antiquo to the use of the inhabitants of a town or village" should not be considered mawat. On this basis, the British District Officer of Beersheba considered the uncultivated land in his district in 1926 as "Metruka for pasture by custom".

=== Israel ===
The British never completed their surveys of the Negev and for various reasons most of the mawat lands were still unregistered when the State of Israel was established. The mawat lands became property of the state under Israeli law which continued to administer the land under the pre-existing laws. After the 1947–1949 Palestine war, the administration of the mawat lands passed to the Israel Land Administration. The few Bedouin remaining in the Negev after the 1947–1949 Palestine war were transferred to the Siyag area of the Negev, which remained under martial law until 1966.

A notable 2012 Israeli Beersheba District Court decision and a subsequent 2015 Israeli Supreme Court decision confirmed that the Al-Araqeeb ('Araqib) tribal lands were indeed mawat property as of the "effective date" of 1954, and that neither prior laws (going back to the 1858 Ottoman Land Law), nor international law, nor the facts of the case, nor indigenousness, nor the history of "cultivation and revival" and barrenness and surveys of the land, nor internal tribal agreements had bestowed land ownership rights to the tribe.

== See also ==
- Regional Council of Unrecognized Villages
- Unrecognized Bedouin villages in Israel
