= Khirbet Abu Samara =

- Horvat Shmarya
- Shown in Israel
- 31°21′4.195″N 34°40′36.052″E
- Periods: Chalcolithic(?), Byzanine, Early Islamic, Modern era
- Location: Israel
- Region: Negev, Israel

Site notes
- Excavation dates: 2025

Khirbet Abu Samara, also known as Horvat Shmarya (Hebrew: חורבת שמריה) is an archaeological site in the northwestern Negev, Israel. It is situated between Mishmar HaNegev and Highway 25. The site is named after Nabi Samara, a Bedouin saint who is believed to have been buried there.

The site features underground construction, maybe from the Chalcolithic period, and the remains of a Byzantine settlement. During the Mandatory period (1917–1948) a small Bedouin settlement existed on the site, which was evacuated by Israeli authorities in 1951. The site has been damaged by looting and in 2025 the Israel Antiquities Authority conducted a community excavation at the site along with the Bnei Shimon Regional Council.

== Geography ==
The site is located on the northern bank of Wadi Abu Samara (Hebrew: Nahal Shmarya), which flows into Nahal Patish. It lies near the confluence of the stream and one of its main tributaries, where natural springs emerge. At this location there is an outcrop of chalk from the Beit Guvrin Formation, in which water cisterns were hewn, as well as a patch of conglomerate belonging to the Sakiya Group. It is also one of the few sites, if not the only one, where kurkar (calcareous sandstone) meets chalk. The vegetation at the site is mainly herbaceous, and it hosts a rich population of reptiles. Today the site is an open area surrounded by agricultural fields.

== Archaeology ==
Subterranean construction has been documented at the site, resembling similar structures discovered in Beersheba and at the Giv‘at HaOranim site (near Shoham), which are dated to the Chalcolithic period. About 5 km to the southwest lay the Chalcolithic site of Gilat, which was a central settlement in the region. In addition, the site contains remains of a major settlement from the Byzantine and Early Islamic periods, including marble columns and architectural elements of a large public building, possibly a church, as well as ancient caves, water cisterns, coins, and pottery sherds. The site also contained a Muslim cemetery where, according to tradition, the Bedouin saint Nabi Samara is buried.

In July 2025, the Israel Antiquities Authority conducted a community excavation in cooperation with the Bnei Shimon Regional Council. The excavation was attended by 400 volunteers from families of the Shoval and Mishmar HaNegev kibbutzim.

== Modern Bedouin settlement ==
On the late 19th century map of the Palestine Exploration Fund, the site appears under the name Kh. Abu Samarah, in a general area inhabited by the Bedouin tribe ʿArab al-Tiyāha. In this area passed the Rafah–Beersheba railway, which was built by the British Army during World War I in preparation for the Battle of Beersheba (October 1917). The line remained in operation until 1927, when it was dismantled due to lack of economic viability. During the British Mandate period, a Bedouin settlement existed at the site. In 1951, after the establishment of the State of Israel, the inhabitants were evacuated by order of the authorities to the Siyag area. Today, in Neighborhood 8 of the Bedouin town of Hura, one of the streets is named Abu Samara, and the residents of the neighborhood trace their origins to the settlement that once existed at the site.

== Archaeological looting ==
The site has been subject to extensive antiquities looting. In 2013, three looters were caught by the Israel Police and the Antiquities Theft Prevention Unit, and in 2017 five more were caught, all of them residents of Rahat. In both cases the looters told the police that they were motivated by rumors and legends of a gold treasure at the site, but their actions caused only irreversible damage to the remains. In 2022, twelve looting pits were documented, while in 2025 more than ninety were recorded, indicating an increase in looting activity. The archaeological remains at the site cover an area of about 225 dunams according to a survey by the DSH Institute. However, the Israel Antiquities Authority initially declared the protected area at 1,400 dunams, and as of 2025 it encompasses about 5,000 dunams.

== Bibliography ==
- Mendelson, A.; Ohayon, S.; Ben-Natan, D.; Ben-Zvi, G.; Waltzer, N.; Winter-Livne, R.; Kabra-Laikin, L.; Shacham, B.; Scherfberg, S. (2024). Nahal Shmarya: Survey, Analysis and Evaluation of Nature, Landscape and Human Heritage. Final Report (in Hebrew). Tel Aviv: Open Landscape Institute.
