= The International Expo of Sport (1955) =

Exposition held in Turin, Italy

1955 Turin

Overview
- BIE-class: Specialized exposition
- Category: International specialized exposition
- Name: Esposizione Internazionale dello Sport di Torino del 1955
- Visitors: 120,000

Participant(s)
- Countries: 11

Location
- Country: Italy
- City: Turin

Timeline
- Opening: 25 May 1955
- Closure: 19 June 1955

Specialized expositions
- Previous: The International Exhibition of Navigation in Naples
- Next: Exhibition of citriculture in Beit Dagan

Universal
- Previous: Expo 58 in Brussels
- Next: Century 21 Exposition in Seattle

Simultaneous
- Specialized: Helsingborg exhibition 1955

The International Expo of Sport (Esposizione Internazionale dello Sport di Torino del 1955) was held in Turin, Italy, from 25 May to 19 June 1955. Recognised by the Bureau International des Expositions as a Specialised Expo, it focused on the theme "Sports", and welcomed 120,000 visitors. Delegates from eleven countries participated in the event, which was organised under the umbrella of the Italian National Olympic Committee (CONI).

== See also ==
- Prima Esposizione Internazionale d'Arte Decorativa Moderna (1902)
- Turin International (1911)
- Expo 61
- List of world's fairs
