= Conquest of the Desert (exhibition) =

1953 exposition in Israel

1953 Jerusalem
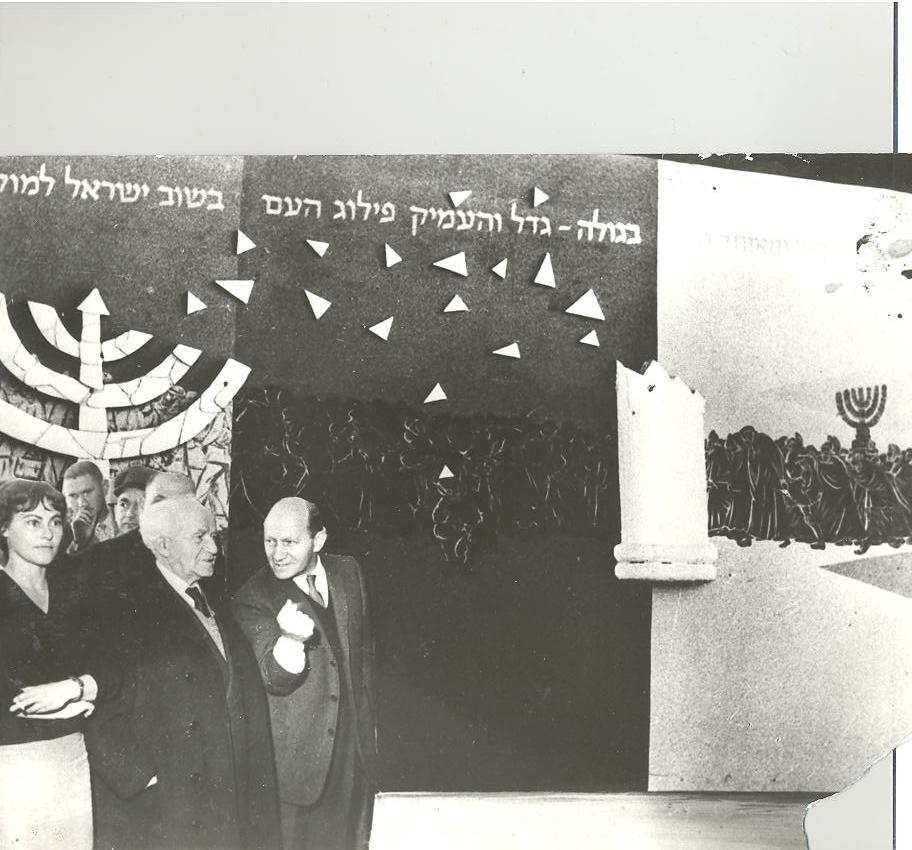
- Nachman Tamir with Israeli prime minister David Ben-Gurion at the exhibition

Overview
- BIE-class: Specialized exposition
- Name: International Exhibition and Fair Jerusalem Israel
- Motto: Conquest of the Desert
- Building(s): Jerusalem Convention Center
- Area: 37 acres
- Visitors: 600,000

Participant(s)
- Countries: 14

Location
- Country: Israel
- City: Jerusalem
- Coordinates: 31.7865°N 35.2026°E

Timeline
- Awarded: 13 November 1951
- Opening: 22 September 1953
- Closure: 14 October 1953

Specialized expositions
- Previous: The International Textile Exhibition in Lille
- Next: The International Exhibition of Navigation (1954) in Naples

Universal expositions
- Previous: Exposition internationale du bicentenaire de Port-au-Prince in Port-au-Prince
- Next: Expo 58 in Brussels

Horticultural expositions
- Next: Floriade 1960 in Rotterdam

Simultaneous
- Specialized: EA 53

Conquest of the Desert was a Specialized Expo recognized by the 28th General Assembly of the Bureau International des Expositions on 13 November 1951, held in Israel in 1953 at Binyanei Ha'uma, a convention center in Jerusalem. It focused on the themes of reclamation and population of desert areas.

== History ==
The exhibition was opened on 22 September by President Ben Zvi and acting Prime Minister Moshe Sharett. It lasted for 22 days, closing on 14 October. It was visited by 600,000 people.

Thirteen foreign countries participated which included the United States although it declared a boycott of the opening ceremony. The Soviet Union declined to attend. Both UNESCO and the World Health Organization also attended.

Postage stamps commemorating the exhibition were designed by Abram Games.

== See also ==
- Culture of Israel
- Making the desert bloom – Zionist slogan
