= Exhibition of Citriculture =

1956 exposition held in Israel

1956 Beit Dagan
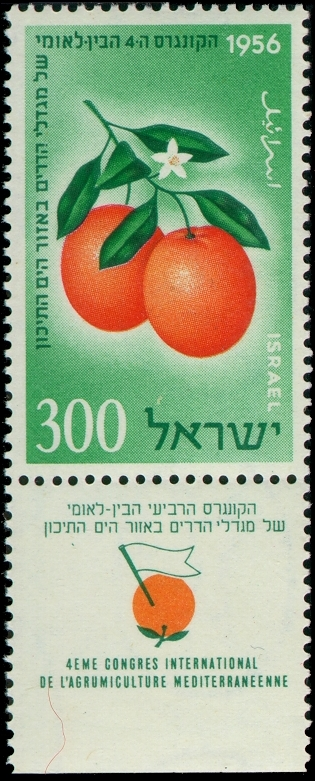
- Stamp of International Citrus Growers' Congress

Overview
- BIE-class: Specialized exposition
- Category: International specialized exposition
- Name: The International Exhibition of Citriculture
- Area: 55

Participant(s)
- Countries: 25

Location
- Country: Israel
- City: Beit Dagan
- Coordinates: 32°0′9.68″N 34°49′45.29″E

Timeline
- Opening: May 21, 1956
- Closure: June 20, 1956

Specialized expositions
- Previous: The International Expo of Sport (1955) in Turin
- Next: Interbau in Berlin

Universal
- Previous: Expo 58 in Brussels
- Next: Century 21 Exposition in Seattle

The International Exhibition of Citriculture was a Specialised Expo recognised by the Bureau International des Expositions. The Expo took place from 21 May to 20 June 1956 in Beit Dagan, Israel and was organised within the framework of the fourth International Congress of Mediterranean Citrus Growers.
