= EA 53 =

1953 agricultural exhibition in Italy

1953 Rome

Overview
- BIE-class: Specialised exposition
- Name: Esposizione internazionale dell'agricoltura di Roma 1953
- Area: 12
- Visitors: 1,700,000

Location
- Country: Italy
- City: Rome
- Venue: EUR, Rome

Timeline
- Opening: 26 July 1953
- Closure: 31 October 1953

Specialised expositions
- Previous: The International Textile Exhibition in Lille
- Next: The International Exhibition of Navigation (1954) in Naples

Universal
- Previous: Exposition internationale du bicentenaire de Port-au-Prince in Port-au-Prince
- Next: Expo 58 in Brussels

Simultaneous
- Specialized: Conquest of the Desert (exhibition)

The EA 53, (full name Esposizione internazionale dell'agricoltura di Roma 1953) was held in Rome, Italy, from 26 July to 31 October 1953. The Expo focused on modern agricultural innovations and was recognised by the Bureau International des Expositions as a Specialised Expo. The Palazzo della Civiltà Italiana, located in the Esposizione Universale Roma (EUR) district of Rome was the site of the Expo, which welcomed 1,700,000 visitors.
