= Siyag =

The Siyag (also called Sayig) is a region of the Negev in Israel which is home to the Bedouin Arabs who live there. The Bedouin were forced to relocate to the Siyag from other regions of the Negev after the 1947–1949 Palestine war.

== Creation of the State ==
1947–1949 Palestine war displaced many Palestinian Arabs, most of whom fled their homes to Jordan, Gaza and the West Bank. Those remaining were forced out their homes and expelled to the Siyag. Subject to military governance, they were not allowed free travel around the Negev, even to the lands they had formerly inhabited. It has been described as the "forced concentration of the Bedouin".

As of 2020 the Israel Land Administration holds 55% of land in the Siyag.

== Land disputes ==
In addition to security procedures, another reason for the transfers was to prevent Bedouin settlement of mawat lands. The sedentarization of the once nomadic Bedouin was ongoing through the 1950s and 60s eventually coming into the conflict with the State's development policy. Seeing the expansion of Bedouin settlement (driven by population growth) as a threat, the Israeli state promoted "planned urbanization" to relocate the Bedouin to established towns.

The original state plan was for three settlements to house tens of thousands of Bedouins. By limiting Bedouin residential areas to a few high-density settlements, the government thought it could save on infrastructure costs and take control of grazing lands in the siyag to reallocate them for other State developments that would not benefit the Bedouin. The Bedouin were dissatisfied with the implementation of the State's urbanization initiative leading to disputes over land rights and resource allocation.

As of 2020, only around half the Bedouin had relocated, mostly landless and poor Bedouin. The disputes have widened in scope as it's become clear that the lifestyle in the high-density urban settlements has undermined the agropastoral basis of Bedouin economic life and the traditional customs that go along with it.
