= Ottoman Land Code of 1858 =

Land titles under the Ottoman Empire

The Ottoman Land Code of 1858 (recorded as 1274 in the Islamic calendar) was the beginning of a systematic land reform programme during the Tanzimat (reform) period of the Ottoman Empire in the second half of the 19th century. This was followed by the 1873 land emancipation act.

== Background ==
=== Land property 1516-1858 ===
Prior to 1859, land in Ottoman Syria, a part of the Ottoman Empire since 1516, was cultivated or occupied mainly by local farmers. Land ownership was regulated by people living on the land according to customs and traditions. Usually, land was communally owned by village residents, though it could be owned by individuals or families. The Ottoman Empire classified land into five categories:

1. Arazi Memluke- Lands held in fee simple, freehold lands
2. Arazi Mirie- Crown lands belonging to the state exchequer
3. Arazi Mevkufe- Lands possessed in mortmain, but tenanted by a kind of copyhold
4. Arazi Metruke- Lands abandoned without cultivation or ostensible owner
5. Arazi Mevat- Dead lands, uncultivated and unappropriated.

Arazi Memluke lands were properties owned by private individuals and acquired through conquest, state endowment, or inheritance. These lands were subject to taxation by the Ottoman Empire.

Arazi Mirie lands were state owned properties that the Ottoman sultan could bestow to loyal subjects, viziers, and military commanders (these lands were kept through payments to the Ottoman Empire).

Arazi Mevkufe is land constituting Arazi Memluke which has been made Vakf in accordance with the Sharia. Vakf means that the Ottoman Sultan has assigned the tithes or taxes to a specific object as opposed to an individual.

Arazi Metruke is land that has been allocated for public use (ex. roads).

Arazi Mevat is land that nobody has claimed ownership of which has subsequently been neglected and remains uncultivated".

The abolition of Musha land tenure is often mistakenly attributed to the 1858 land code.

=== Enforcement ===
Prior to the enactment of the Ottoman Land Code, 1858, land was held by virtue of Sultanic decrees, grants made by conquerors of various areas, judgments of both civil and Muslim religious courts, orders of administrative authorities and deeds of sale executed before the Muslim courts. Encroachment on unoccupied land belonging to the State and various other unauthorised methods accounted for large holdings. Land acquired by lawful means (such as grant from a competent authority) was, in theory at least, reported to Constantinople, where an effort was made to maintain a series of registers known as the daftar khaqani (imperial land registers).

== 1858 Land Code ==
The Ottoman Land Code of 1858, prepared by the Tanzimat Council, was an original Ottoman creation, neither European nor entirely Islamic. It was founded on traditional land practices and included categories of land cited in Islamic law.

In 1858 the Ottoman Empire introduced The Ottoman Land Code of 1858, requiring land owners to register ownership. The reasons behind the law were twofold. (1) to increase tax revenue, and (2) to exercise greater state control over the area.

=== Opposition ===
Small farmers, however, saw no need to register claims, for several reasons:

- Land owners were subject to military service in the Ottoman Army
- General opposition to official regulations from the Ottoman Empire
- Evasion of taxes and registration fees to the Ottoman Empire

=== Outcome ===
The registration process itself was open to manipulation. Land collectively owned by village residents was registered in the name of a single landowner, with merchants and local Ottoman administrators registering large stretches of land in their own name. The result was land that became the legal property of people who may have never lived there, while locals, even those who had lived on the land for generations, became tenants of absentee owners.

=== Land classification ===
With the enactment of the Ottoman Land Code, that same year the Turkish Government also passed the Land Registration Law of 1858, for better regulation of its land tenure laws, and, by way of extension, a more efficient way of levying taxes on property.

The Ottoman land law classifies land under five kinds or categories. These, with suggested approximate counterparts in English, are as follows:

- (a) Waqf generally was property gifted to a pious end, consisting of allodial land in mortmain tenure, being land assured to pious foundations or revenue from land assured to pious foundations; also usufruct State land of which the State revenues are assured to pious foundations
- (b) Mülk was land given by the Ottoman conqueror to Muslims, or Khuraj lands given to Christians and taxed, in exchange for Muslim protection. It was private or allodial land (held in absolute ownership).
- (c) Miri was neither (a) nor (b) but referred to lands given out for conditional public use, while ultimate ownership lay with the Emir. It was feudal or State land, but can also specifically refer to vacant State land, private usufruct State land. A sub-category of the same is mahlul (f), or what is defined as escheated State land. Most Ottoman registrations of miri (usufruct) titles existing in the Mutasarrifate of Jerusalem are based on a presumed or lost grant.
- (d) Matruka = communal profits-à-prendre land, being land subject to public easements in common, or servitude State land, such as roads, cemeteries and pastures. Included in this class is Meraʿa land, meaning, pasture land reserved primarily for the use of the adjoining villages.
- (e) Mewat/Mawat = dead (uncultivated/uninhabited) land; unoccupied lands not held by title deed, and lying over 1.5 miles from any town or village.
- (f) A sixth category existed, known as mahlul, land that reverted to the state if left uncultivated for 3 years or left vacant and up for re-grant.

=== Regional variation ===
The extent to which each of these modes of law applied to the several countries under Ottoman rule varied, and was largely dependent upon the country itself.

== 1858 Land Code in the Mutasarrifate of Jerusalem ==
=== Late Ottoman (1858-1918) ===
As an example for regional variations, not all of these modes of user were actually found in the Mutasarrifate of Jerusalem. The extent of mulk or allodial lands (privately owned property) in the Mutasarrifate of Jerusalem was limited, and was usually only found in the old cities or in garden areas. Rural land in this category was rare. In nearly all cases (excluding only “Waqf” lands, and communal profits-à-prendre land, or dead and undeveloped land), lands were either mulk or miri tenures.

=== British rule (OETA and Mandate) ===
Local Palestinian tradition, underwritten by both Ottoman and British law, held that the land belonged to God or the sultan: families could maintain the land but the notion of private property title was alien, despite efforts since 1858 to introduce it. Until British rule, which redistributed land to individual family units, village land was held collectively by the hamula or clan. The Ottoman system and all later governments until 1967 acknowledged that the land surrounding the village was for the use of its inhabitants either as common pastures or for the future development of the village. The villagers did not have any need or opportunity to register their lands. They knew among themselves which of the village lands belonged to which families and which were owned in common (mashaa ). Customary practice however under the British was reviewed to consider all land within village and town boundaries as no longer miri but mülk.

When the British assumed control over the Mutasarrifate of Jerusalem at the end of 1917 with the disintegration of the Ottoman Empire, they applied the Ottoman laws of the Ottoman Land Code of 1858 to all inhabitants. The laws then in place were officially recognized by Article 46 of the King's Speech (enacted in the name of King George V on 10 August 1922, Palestine Order in Council), according to which provisions the validity of the Ottoman law that existed in Palestine on November 1, 1914, was recognized, and made subject to orders and regulations issued from then on by the mandate government.

The Ottoman Land Code inherited by the British prescribed that houses were mostly privately owned and called "mulk land" (land vested fully and completely to their owners), while land was viewed as miri (allotted by the state to a village or number of villages and which cannot be private property of individuals), and is only leased to the tenants of indefinite duration, in which the lease is represented by the obligation to pay land taxes and land registry fees. When the miri interest is alienated, the ultimate ownership called raqaba is retained by the State.

At the time of the British occupation the land tax was collected at the rate of 12.5% of the gross yield of the land. Crops were assessed on the threshing floor or in the field and the tithe was collected from the cultivators. In 1925, additional legislation provided that taxation on crops and other produce not exceed 10%. In 1928, as a measure of reform, the Mandate Government of Palestine began to apply an Ordinance for the "Commutation of Tithes," this tax in effect being a fixed aggregate amount paid annually. It was related to the average amount of tithe (tax) that had been paid by the village during the four years immediately preceding the application of the Ordinance to it.

In 1936 the Survey of Palestine stated that the State Lands measured 500 sq miles out of Palestine's total area of 10,500 sq miles; at that point 51% of State Domain was occupied by Arabs and 17% by Jews.

=== West Bank under Jordanian and Israeli rule ===
By June 1967, only a third of West Bank land had been registered under the Settlement of Disputes over Land and Water Law and Israel quickly moved, in 1968, to cancel the possibility of registering one's title with the Jordanian Land Register. Claims for land in the other two thirds depended on either a Turkish or British certificate of registration, or through tax registers and proof of purchase under Jordanian law. On assuming control, Israel suspended these procedures, and asserted that of five categories of land in the old Ottoman Law – waqf. mülk, miri, matruke and mawat – the last three were state land, taking advantage of modifications enacted by the British Mandatory Authority, such as the Mawat Land Ordinance of 1921. The Jordanian government never considered the last three as state land, and only a very small proportion of the West Bank was registered as such under Jordanian rule.

== See also ==
- Ottoman law & land administration
  - Düstur, code of law
  - Defter, land and tax registry
  - Tanzimat, 19th-century reform movement
  - Pre-1858 land ownership systems
    - Timar
    - Chiftlik
- Foreign purchases of real estate in Turkey
- Israeli land and property laws
  - Torrens title in Israel
- Land reform

== Sources ==
- Kelly, Tobias (2006). Law, Violence and Sovereignty Among West Bank Palestinians. Cambridge University Press. ISBN 978-1-139-46099-6.
- Kimmerling, Baruch (2008). Clash of Identities: Explorations in Israeli and Palestinian Societies. Columbia University Press. ISBN 978-0-231-51249-7.
- Nicoletti, Claudia; Hearne, Anne-Maria (2012). Pillage of the Dead Sea: Israel's Unlawful Exploitation of Natural Resources in the Occupied Palestinian Territories. Al-Haq. ISBN 978-9-950-32734-4. Archived from the original on 2020-01-31.
- Shehadeh, Raja (Spring–Summer 1985b). "Some Legal Aspects of Israeli Land Policy in the Occupied Territories". Arab Studies Quarterly. 7 (2–3): 42–61. JSTOR 41857768.
- Stein, Kenneth W. (2017). The Land Question in Palestine, 1917-1939. University of North Carolina Press. ISBN 978-1-469-61725-1.
- LeVine, Mark (2005). Overthrowing geography: Jaffa, Tel Aviv, and the struggle for Palestine, 1880-1948. Berkeley: University of California Press. ISBN 0520243714.
