= Musha land =

Ottoman agricultural term

Musha' lands (مشاع) are agricultural common lands owned jointly by the community and loosely taxed, as defined in the Land Code of 1858.

== Redistribution ==
Lands designated as musha are periodically redistributed among the heads of the prominent families of the tribe usually by drawing lots. The longest period between redistributions is at most nine years. If ten years elapses there is a rule of established possession for that land. The parcels of land are distributed so no one is assigned the same parcel for two consecutive periods.

== Composition of land ==
According to S. Ilan Troen 70% of land in Palestine was musha in 1918. Kenneth W. Stein says that by 1923 musha lands had been reduced to around half the lands under the British colonial regime in Mandatory Palestine. By 1946 only 20% of the lands were musha.
