= The International Exhibition of Navigation =

1954 maritime expo in Naples, Italy

1954 Naples

Overview
- BIE-class: Specialized exposition
- Category: International specialized exposition
- Name: The International Exhibition of Navigation
- Area: 100 hectares (250 acres)

Participant(s)
- Countries: 25

Location
- Country: Italy
- City: Naples

Timeline
- Opening: May 15, 1954
- Closure: October 15, 1954

Specialized expositions
- Previous: EA 53 in Rome
- Next: The International Expo of Sport (1955) in Turin

Universal
- Previous: Expo 58 in Brussels
- Next: Century 21 Exposition in Seattle

The International Exhibition of Navigation (Fiera internazionale della navigazione, also Mostra Oltremare) was a Specialised Expo organised to showcase the maritime industry. It held from 15 May to 15 October 1954 in Naples, Italy and received delegates from 25 countries. The Expo, which took place at the Mostra d’Oltremare, was recognised by the Bureau International des Expositions.
