= Beit Dagan =

Beit Dagan בֵּית דָּגָן
- Local council (from 1958)

Hebrew transcription(s)
  - ISO 259: Beit Dagan
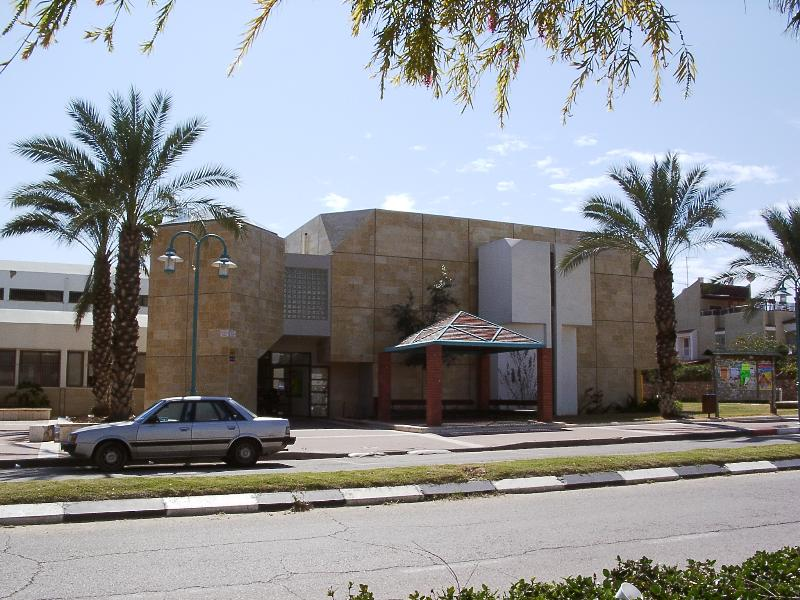

- Location within Central Israel Location within Israel
- Coordinates: 32°0′9.68″N 34°49′45.29″E
- Country: Israel
- District: Central
- Subdistrict: Ramla
- Natural Region: Ramla
- Founded: 1948

Government
  - Head of Municipality: Elyahu Dadon

Area
  - Total: 1,530 dunams (1.53 km^{2}; 0.59 sq mi)

Population (2024)
  - Total: 7,728
  - Density: 5,050/km^{2} (13,100/sq mi)
- Name meaning: House of Grain

Beit Dagan (Hebrew: בֵּית דָּגָן, lit. 'House of Grain') is a local council (town) in the Central District of Israel. As of 2021, Beit Dagan had a population of 7,728.

== History ==
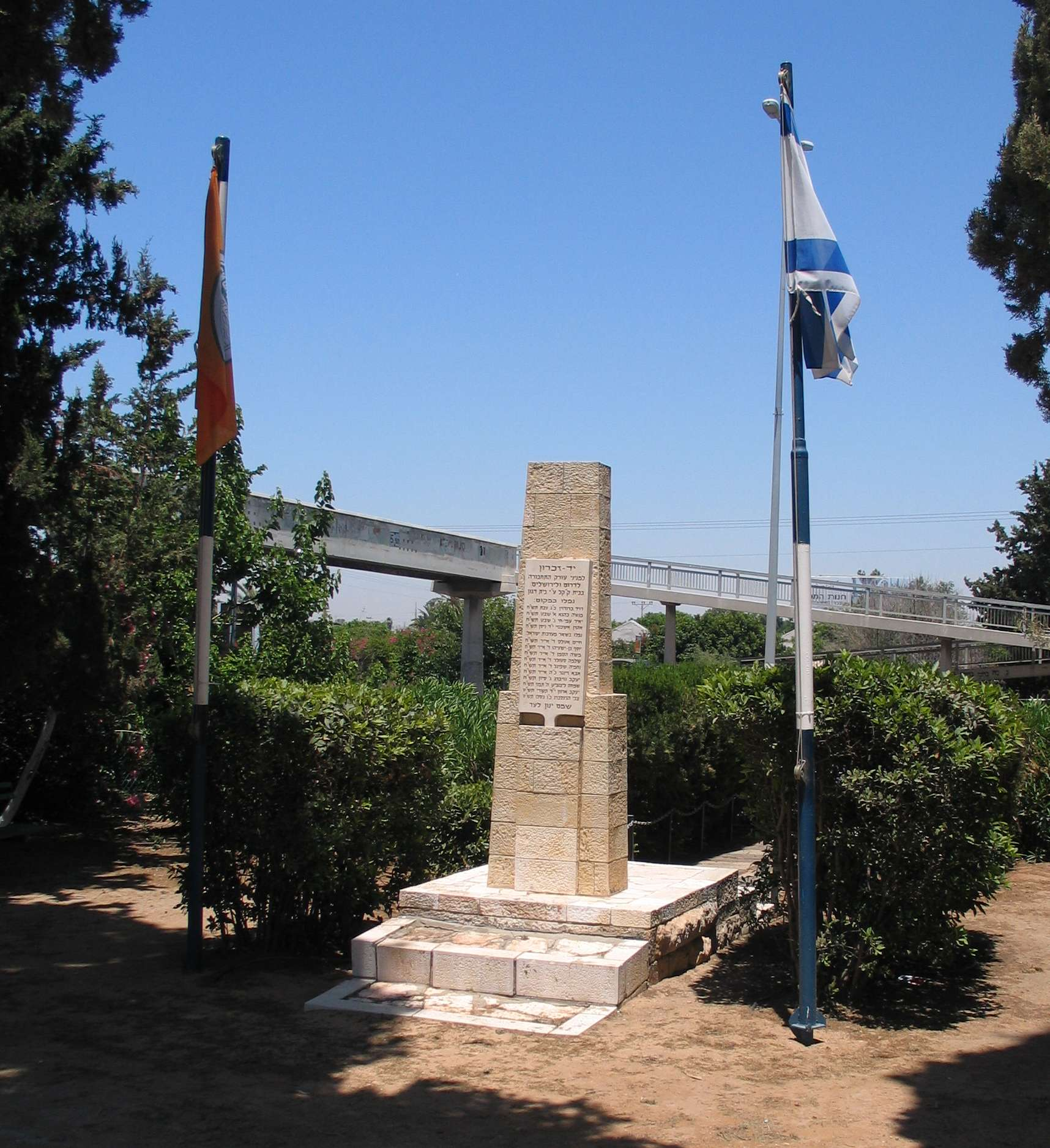
War memorial near Beit Dagan

During the Ottoman period, the area of Beit Dagan was part of to the Nahiyeh (sub-district) of Lod, which encompassed the area of present-day Modi'in-Maccabim-Re'ut in the south to the present-day city of El'ad in the north, and from the foothills in the east, through the Lod Valley to the outskirts of Jaffa in the west. This area was home to thousands of inhabitants in about 20 villages, who had at their disposal tens of thousands of hectares of prime agricultural land.

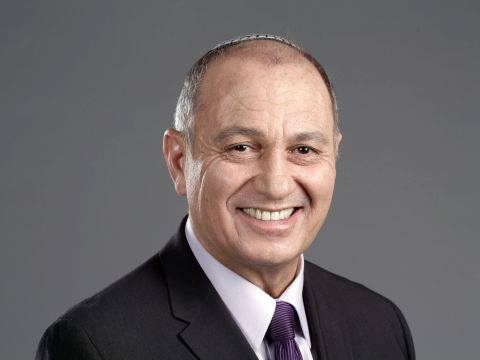
Eli Dadon, Mayor 1983-2012 and 2018-present

Modern day Beit Dagan was founded in 1948 at the site of the former Palestinian village of Bayt Dajan, by Mizrahi Jewish immigrants from Yemen and North Africa. It is probably situated in the area of Biblical Beit Dagon, a village in the tribe of Judah (Joshua 15:41). Dagan, or Dagon, was also the name of an early semitic deity, and one of Dagans most important functions was guaranteeing abundant harvests of grain. Beit Dagan was awarded local council status in 1958.

== National government institutions ==
The Israel Meteorological Service and the Israel Ministry of Agriculture and Food Security are located near Beit Dagan. Both of these organizations officially list their addresses as being located in Beit Dagan (and are generally known to the public as such), although they are actually physically located within the municipal borders of nearby Rishon LeZion.

== Climate ==
Beit Dagan has a Mediterranean climate with hot and rainless summers, and with cold and rainy winters. Springs and autumns are cool to warm. Humidity is high during winter and low during summer, which makes summers rainless and hot, between average high of 30.8 °C (87.4 °F) and average low of 20.4 °C (68.7 °F). Winters are rainy and mild, between average high of 18.5 °C (65.3 °F) and average low of 7.6 °C (45.7 °F). Beit Dagan receives 550.5 mm (21.7 in) of precipitation per year and there are only 7 months of heavy rain.

Climate data for Beit Dagan (1991-2020)
Month	Jan	Feb	Mar	Apr	May	Jun	Jul	Aug	Sep	Oct	Nov	Dec	Year
Record high °C (°F)	28.6 (83.5)	32.6 (90.7)	37.8 (100.0)	40.9 (105.6)	43.5 (110.3)	43.0 (109.4)	41.5 (106.7)	38.4 (101.1)	41.9 (107.4)	41.5 (106.7)	36.2 (97.2)	30.2 (86.4)	43.5 (110.3)
Mean daily maximum °C (°F)	17.8 (64.0)	18.8 (65.8)	21.3 (70.3)	24.6 (76.3)	27.6 (81.7)	29.7 (85.5)	31.4 (88.5)	32.0 (89.6)	31.0 (87.8)	28.9 (84.0)	24.6 (76.3)	19.9 (67.8)	25.6 (78.1)
Daily mean °C (°F)	12.9 (55.2)	13.6 (56.5)	15.9 (60.6)	18.9 (66.0)	22.0 (71.6)	24.8 (76.6)	26.9 (80.4)	27.5 (81.5)	26.1 (79.0)	23.4 (74.1)	18.9 (66.0)	14.8 (58.6)	20.5 (68.9)
Mean daily minimum °C (°F)	8.0 (46.4)	8.4 (47.1)	10.4 (50.7)	13.1 (55.6)	16.4 (61.5)	19.8 (67.6)	22.3 (72.1)	23.0 (73.4)	21.2 (70.2)	17.8 (64.0)	13.2 (55.8)	9.6 (49.3)	15.3 (59.5)
Record low °C (°F)	−1.4 (29.5)	−0.8 (30.6)	2.2 (36.0)	3.1 (37.6)	9.4 (48.9)	12.5 (54.5)	16.4 (61.5)	17.6 (63.7)	10.8 (51.4)	9.9 (49.8)	1.5 (34.7)	0.9 (33.6)	−1.4 (29.5)
Average precipitation mm (inches)	140.5 (5.53)	96.9 (3.81)	66.1 (2.60)	17.5 (0.69)	2.2 (0.09)	0 (0)	0 (0)	0 (0)	0.4 (0.02)	20.4 (0.80)	76.2 (3.00)	130.3 (5.13)	550.5 (21.67)
Mean monthly sunshine hours	181.7	184.0	241.8	277.8	326.9	352.0	362.0	332.7	288.8	263.7	213.7	181.2	3,206.3
Source 1: NOAA, DWD
Source 2: Israel Meteorological Service (precipitation)

== Transportation ==
Beit Dagan's main transportation hub is the Beit Dagan Junction, between highway 44 and route 412, serving as a bus terminal for lines to Rishon LeZion, Tzrifin, Ashkelon, Tel Aviv, Petah Tikva, Rehovot, etc.

The large Shapirim Interchange (intersection of Highway 1 and Route 412) is located on the northern side of town.

== Voting Patterns ==
In the 2022 election, 66 percent of voters in Beit Dagan voted for the parties of the right-wing coalition led by Benjamin Netanyahu, while 32 percent voted for the parties of the center-left coalition led by Yair Lapid and 0.02 percent voted for the Arab parties.

In the 2026 election, 59 percent of voters in Beit Dagan voted for the parties of the right-wing coalition led by Benjamin Netanyahu, while 34 percent voted for the parties of the center-left coalition led by Gadi Eisenkot and 0.1 percent voted for the Arab parties. An additional 4.8 percent voted for the Reservists, and 2.1 percent voted for Amcha Yisrael. Voter turnout increased 8 percent from the 2022 election.

== Notable residents ==
- Yam Madar (born 2000), Israeli professional basketball player, playing for Fenerbahçe S.K. (basketball) in the Turkish Basketbol Süper Ligi
