= List of world's fair mascots =

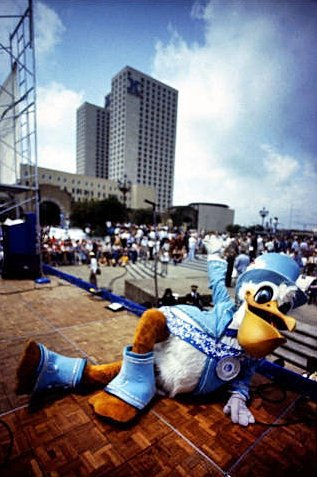
Seymore D. Fair, first World's Fair mascot

Expo mascots have been used at Bureau International des Expositions-approved world's fairs since the 1984 Louisiana World Exposition. Seymore D. Fair was the official mascot of the 1984 Louisiana World Exposition as well as the first World's Fair mascot.

| Expo | Mascot name | Description | Refs. |
|---|---|---|---|
| 1984 | Seymore D. Fair | A pelican | |
| 1985 | Cosmo Hoshimaru | A planet-shaped alien | |
| 1986 | Expo Ernie | A robot | |
| 1988 | Expo Oz | A platypus | |
| 1992 | Curro | A large bird with a multi-colored beak | |
| 1993 | Kumdori | A cosmic elf | |
| 1998 | Gil | Named after Portuguese explorer Gil Eanes | |
| 2000 | Twipsy | Designed by Javier Mariscal | |
| 2005 | Kiccoro & Morizo | Forest spirits; Morizo is the grandfather of Kiccoro | |
| 2008 | Fluvi | A mascot made of water | |
| 2010 | Haibao | A figure shaped like the Chinese character 人 | |
| 2012 | Yeony & Suny | Two plankton from the sea | |
| 2015 | Foody | A salad | |
| 2017 | Saule, Kuat & Moldir | They represent the sun, green energy, and water | |
| 2020 | Rashid, Latifa, Alif, Opti and Terra | Two children and three robots | |
| 2025 | Myaku-Myaku | A mysterious creature made of red cells and blue water | |
| 2027 | Rastko and Milica | A boy and girl wearing stylized Serbian folk clothing | |
