= Universal Sport Exhibition (1949) =

1949 Stockholm

Overview
- BIE-class: Specialized exposition
- Name: Universal Sport Exhibition

Participant(s)
- Countries: 37

Location
- Country: Sweden
- City: Stockholm

Timeline
- Opening: 27 July 1949
- Closure: 13 August 1949

Specialized expositions
- Previous: International Exhibition on Urbanism and Housing in Paris
- Next: The International Textile Exhibition in Lille

Universal Expositions
- Previous: 1939 New York World's Fair in New York City
- Next: Expo 58 in Brussels

Simultaneous
- Universal: Exposition internationale du bicentenaire de Port-au-Prince
- Specialized: The International Exhibition of Rural Habitat in Lyon

The Universal Sport Exhibition was a world's fair held in Stockholm, Sweden between 27 July and 13 August 1949. It was a special exhibition centered on the sports in the world. 37 countries participated in the exhibition.
