= Exposition internationale de l'eau =

1939 exposition in Liège, Belgium

1939 Liège

Overview
- BIE-class: Specialized exposition
- Category: International specialized exposition
- Name: Exposition internationale de l'eau de 1939
- Building(s): Albert Canal
- Area: 70 hectares (170 acres)

Participant(s)
- Countries: 8

Location
- Country: Belgium
- City: Liège
- Venue: Parc Astrid
- Coordinates: 50°39′6.8″N 05°36′37.8″E

Timeline
- Opening: 20 May 1939
- Closure: 2 September 1939

Specialized expositions
- Previous: Second International Aeronautic Exhibition in Helsinki
- Next: International Exhibition on Urbanism and Housing in Paris

Universal Expositions
- Previous: Exposition Internationale des Arts et Techniques dans la Vie Moderne in Paris
- Next: Exposition internationale du bicentenaire de Port-au-Prince in Port-au-Prince

Simultaneous
- Universal: 1939 New York World's Fair

The Exposition internationale de la technique de l'eau de 1939 was the third specialized exposition recognized by the Bureau International des Expositions. In 1936 Georges Truffaut proposed an exposition to celebrate the completion of the Albert Canal. The exposition's theme was water management and opened on 20 May 1939 by King Leopold III of Belgium. The canal itself was opened on 30 July 1939.

The exposition was situated on 70 hectares of land and 30 hectares of water on both riverbanks between the Albert Canal and the Pont Atlas. On the site were exhibition halls, restaurants, attractions and a Meuse village with replicas of buildings from the Meuse valley. A part of the site was on land reclaimed from an unnavigable part of the Meuse. An aerial cableway provided a panoramic view over the site.

The exposition was scheduled to run until November 1939, but on 31 August explosives under the Val Benoit Bridge and the Ougrée Bridge were detonated by lightning, resulting in 20 fatalities and 24 injured. The explosives were placed by the Belgian Army to destroy the bridges in case of war. When World War II started the next day it was decided to close the exposition immediately.

== Pavilions ==
=== Germany ===
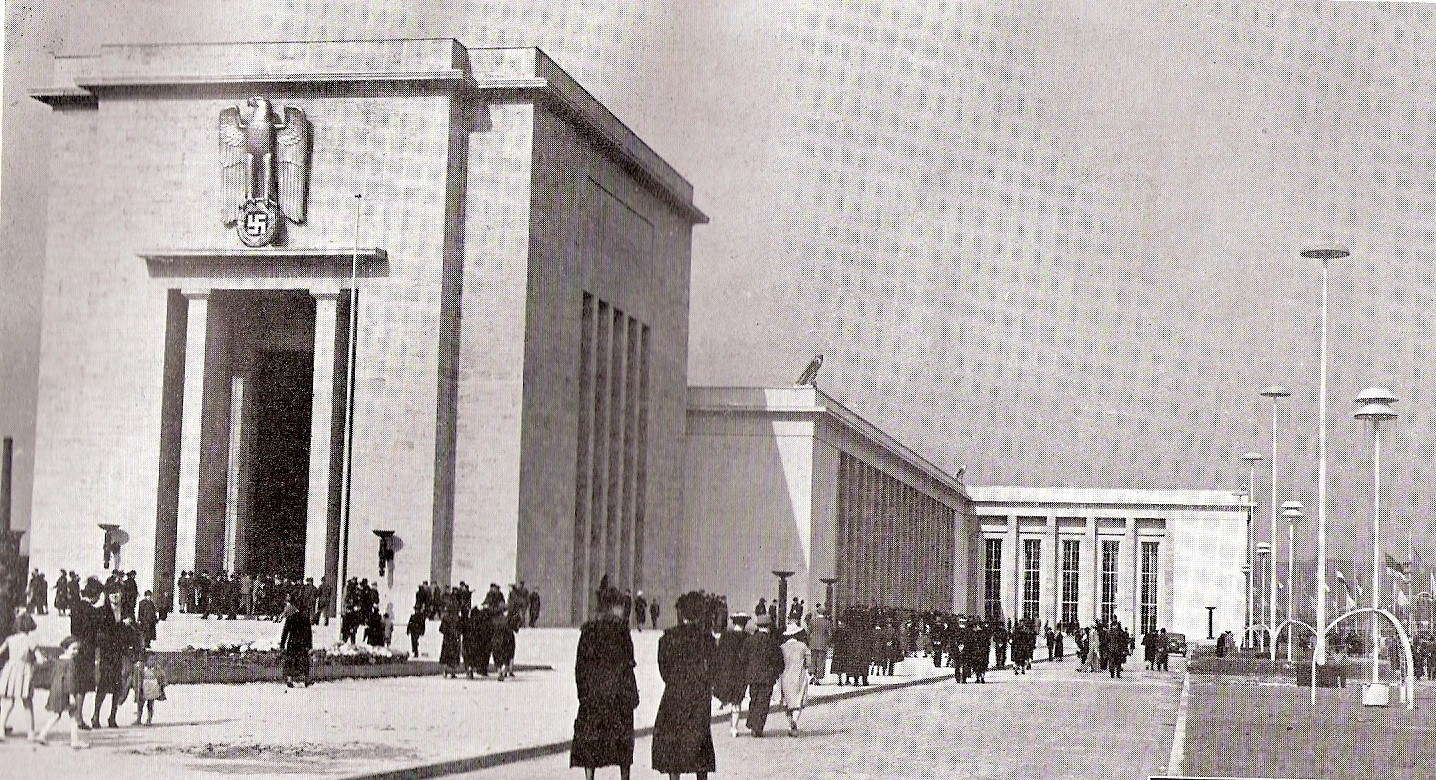
The German Pavilion

The German pavilion was similar to the one in Paris two years before. The pavilion, on the left riverbank was designed by architect Emil Fahrenkamp.

Nazi Germany didn't want to spend money outside Germany. The building materials and equipment were imported from Germany and had to be transported from the Belgian-German border 35 km east of Liège. Every morning the contractors and engineers were transported from Germany by bus or lorry to the site in Liège. The whole column returned to Germany in the evening.

=== France ===
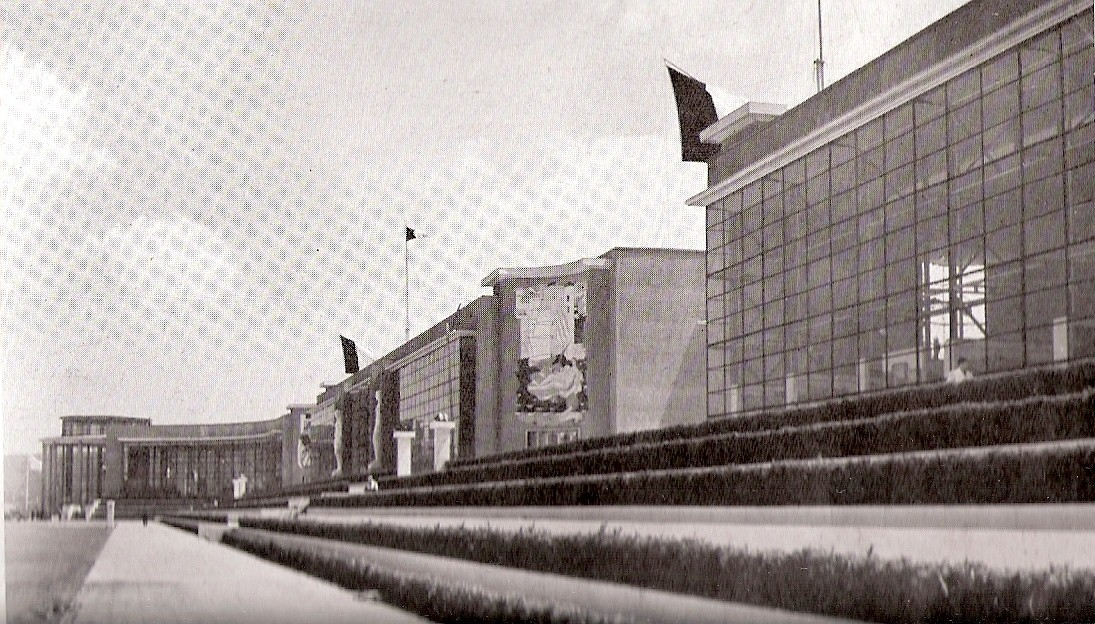
The French Pavilion

The French contribution consisted of three exhibition halls on the right riverbank. The buildings designed by Allix had a surface of 8000 m^{2}.
