= Exposition Universelle (1989) =

The Exposition Universelle de 1989 was a world's fair planned in Paris to celebrate the bicentennial of the French Revolution and the centenary of the Exposition Universelle de 1889. The theme of the fair was to be "The Paths of Liberty: A Project for the Third Millennium". Two fair grounds would have been built along the Seine on both the west and east sides of the city. The plan was supported by President François Mitterrand and his Socialist Party beginning when they came into power in 1981.

The proposal was met with difficulty at the Bureau International des Expositions (BIE), which regulates world's fairs, because Chicago had announced plans to host a 1992 World's Fair to mark the Columbus Quincentenary, and BIE rules stipulated that a Universal Exposition could only occur once every 10 years. The dispute was further complicated when Seville announced it would also organize a world's fair in 1992. This was resolved when the BIE agreed that, since 1989 and 1992 fell in different decades, they could technically be considered 10 years apart so long as there were no other Universal Expositions during the 1980s or 1990s. On 8 December 1982, the BIE agreed to award the 1989 exposition to Paris and 1992 to a joint Chicago–Seville fair.

The Exposition plans also faced opposition from the mayor of Paris, Jacques Chirac, a prominent critic of Mitterrand who led the center-right opposition party Rally for the Republic. Lacking the support of the leadership of the host city, Mitterrand announced on 5 July 1983 that plans for the Exposition would be cancelled.
