= Global Industrial and Social Progress Research Institute =

Japanese Research institute

Global Industrial and Social Progress Research Institute (GISPRI; 地球産業文化研究所) is a Japanese think tank founded in 1988 to research natural resources and environmental problems, the international system, and interaction between industry, economy, culture, and society. It holds the Global Industrial and Social Progress Policy Forum to make policy proposals on these problems. Also, it took over the tasks of Japan Association for the 2005 World Exposition in 2007.

== Enterprise ==
- Research on the global natural resources and environmental problems, international system, and interaction between industry/economy and culture/society.
- Policy proposals on global problems that need to be addressed both domestically and internationally.
- Joint research programs with institutes in Japan and abroad and facilitate exchange of relevant information as well as human resources.
- Provision of information widely through symposia, seminars and publication of the "GISPRI Newsletter" and the Annual Report.

== See also ==
- Expo 2005
- Japan Association for the 2005 World Exposition
