= International Exhibition on Urbanism and Housing =

Specialized exhibition held in Paris, France, in 1947

1947 Paris

Overview
- BIE-class: Specialized exposition
- Category: International specialized exposition
- Name: Exposition internationale de l'habitation et de l'urbanisme
- Building(s): Grand Palais
- Area: Cours-la-Reine

Participant(s)
- Countries: 14

Location
- Country: France
- City: Paris

Timeline
- Opening: July 10, 1947
- Closure: August 15, 1947

Specialized expositions
- Previous: Exposition internationale de l'eau (1939) in Liège
- Next: Universal Sport Exhibition (1949) in Stockholm

Universal Expositions
- Previous: 1939 New York World's Fair in New York City
- Next: Exposition internationale du bicentenaire de Port-au-Prince in Port-au-Prince

The International Exhibition on Urbanism and Housing (French: Exposition internationale de l'habitation et de l'urbanisme) was a specialized exhibition recognised by the Bureau International des Expositions (BIE), which held in Paris, France, from 10 July to 15 August 1947. It focused on housing estate projects in the context of post-war reconstruction and attracted 14 participating countries including Mexico, Poland and South Africa.
