= Gesner Abelard =

Haitian painter and sculptor

Gesner Abelard (born 22 February 1922) was a Haitian painter and sculptor. Born in Port-au-Prince, Abelard began life as a mechanic, then studied painting and sculpture at the Industrial School of Port-au-Prince under the painter Humberman Charles. He became a member of the Haitian Centre d'Art in 1948. In 1949, he received a bronze medal at the International Exposition celebrating the bicentennial of Port-au-Prince. Many of his paintings depict birds, trees and scenes of Haitian life, and he is considered a naïve artist. Abelard is believed to be deceased.
