= Expo 2023 (Buenos Aires, Argentina) =

Cancelled specialized exhibition

2023 Buenos Aires
- Official Logo

Overview
- BIE-class: Specialized exposition
- Category: International Recognized Exhibition
- Name: EXPO2023
- Motto: Science, Innovation, Art and Creativity for Human Development. Creative Industries in Digital Convergence
- Area: 198 ha

Participant(s)
- Countries: More than 100 (est.)

Location
- Country: Argentina
- City: Buenos Aires
- Venue: Tecnópolis
- Coordinates: 34°33′31″S 58°30′41″W

Timeline
- Bidding: 15 December 2016
- Awarded: 15 November 2017
- Opening: (cancelled)
- Closure: (cancelled)

Specialized expositions
- Previous: Expo 2017 in Astana
- Next: Expo 2027 in Belgrade

Universal expositions
- Previous: Expo 2020 in Dubai
- Next: Expo 2025 in Osaka

Horticultural expositions
- Previous: Expo 2022 in Almere
- Next: Expo 2023 in Doha

Internet
- Website: en.expo2023argentina.com.ar

Expo 2023 was a planned specialized exhibition that was scheduled to be held in 2023 in Buenos Aires, Argentina. The Bureau International des Expositions (BIE) awarded Buenos Aires as the host on November 15, 2017. This was to have been the first time that a BIE Expo was held in Argentina, and the first in the country since BIE's creation. In October 2020, Argentina announced that due to the COVID-19 pandemic and the ensuing financial crisis, the expo would not be held as planned in 2023.

The exhibition was scheduled to take place between 15 January and 15 April 2023. The predicted number of visitors was 9.4 million, with 79% visiting for a day and 4% international visitors. Over 100 countries were expected to participate.

== Theme ==
The exhibition was planned to have a theme of "Science, Innovation, Art and Creativity for Human Development. Creative Industries in Digital Convergence". It was to have three sub themes: "How digital convergence reshapes the creative industries and everyday life", "Socio-economic impacts of the creative industries in digital convergence", and "Cultural impacts of the creative industries in digital convergence".

== Preparation ==
=== Building works ===
The exhibition ran a competition for proposals for construction projects, receiving 200 submissions from over 2,000 participants. Six projects were declared the winners.

=== Recognition ===
The Recognition Dossier for the Argentine expo was submitted to the BIE on 14 January 2019. On 14 October 2020, the government told the BIE that they were unable to host as planned and would need more time.

== Other candidates ==
There were two other bids to host the specialized exhibition: Łódź submitted a bid with the theme “City Re:Invented” on 15 June 2016; Minneapolis submitted theirs with a theme titled “Healthy People, Healthy Planet: Wellness and Well Being for All”. The candidature of Rio de Janeiro with the theme “Metropolitan Cities and Sustainability: Cross Border Potentials” did not take part in the election process.

A secret ballot took place to select the winner at BIE's 162nd General Assembly on 15 November 2017. The first ballot awarded 46 votes to both Buenos Aires and Łódź, with Minneapolis gathering only 25 (and 1 abstention). Minneapolis was eliminated from the second round, which gave 62 votes to Buenos Aires and 56 to Łódź.
