= Myaku-Myaku =

Mascot of Expo 2025 world's fair

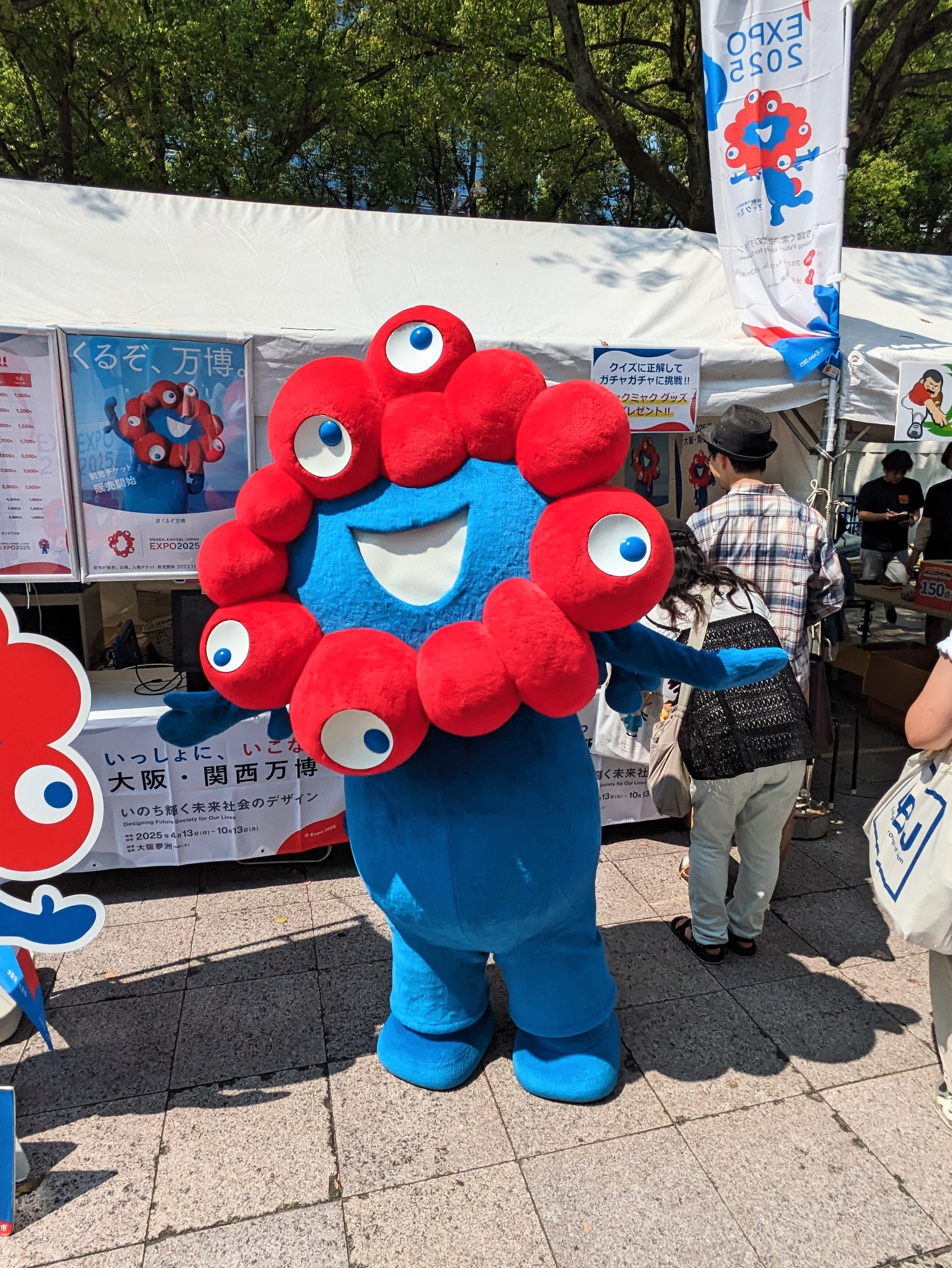
Myaku-Myaku appearing at an event in Nagoya in September 2024

Myaku-Myaku (ミャクミャク, Myakumyaku), officially stylized in all caps as MYAKU-MYAKU, is the mascot and yuru-chara representing Expo 2025, a world's fair held between April 13 and October 13, 2025, in Osaka, Japan. It was designed by picture book illustrator Kouhei Yamashita and named through a public contest by entrants Miyuu Kawakatsu and Hinata Sakuda in early 2022.

== Design ==
Myaku-Myaku is described as "a mysterious creature", with a body composed of cells (red) and water (blue). Typically appearing in an upright, bipedal position, one imitating that of human beings, its body is amorphous, and it can transform into various shapes and configurations. It has a blue torso with two legs, two arms, and a red globular ring as a "head" with multiple eyeballs and a smiling mouth in the middle. Yamashita's design was chosen from nearly 2,000 public submissions. About his design, he said, "Rather than smart or good-looking, I thought people would like a clumsy character". Yamashita has supervised development of Myaku-Myaku's identity such as how it walks, talks, and reacts.

== Name ==
The Japanese onomatopoeia "myaku myaku" means "steadily pulsing". A month after its design was revealed in March 2022, Japan Association for the 2025 World Exposition, the Expo's organizing committee, put out an open call for name submissions; in total, 33,197 submissions were received from citizens and residents of Japan. Two entrants who both submitted the same name had their entries selected as winners. One entrant, Miyuu Kawakatsu (born 1984), mentioned taking inspiration from human DNA, wisdom, technology, history, and culture being passed down between generations as if to a pulsing rhythm, and stated that "with two consecutive sounds, myaku-myaku sounds as if life is continuing." The other entrant, Hinata Sakuda (born 2002), wrote that the red and blue were reminiscent of arteries and veins, and that the word "pulse" (myaku) can represent the link between human civilizations along with the concept of international connection.

== Profile ==
- Place of birth: A small spring in the Kansai region of Japan
- Personality: Friendly, goofy, clumsy
- Special skills: Transforming into various shapes, finding rainbows after rain storms
- Favorite things: Interacting with all creatures and things

== Promotion and merchandise ==
By April 2024, 107 companies had entered into official licensing agreements and over 800 products featuring Myaku-Myaku had been made available, including designs by Sanrio featuring Hello Kitty. JR West began running trains with Myaku-Myaku livery on the Osaka Loop Line on November 30, 2023, 500 days prior to the Expo's opening. Japan Airlines also launched a jet designed with the character which operated until May 2025. The character has appeared in costumed form at events throughout Japan as well as in Australia and Vietnam.

The Expo 2025 organizing committee allows for individuals and organizations to freely create non-commercial art of the character.

== Reception ==
Myaku-Myaku has been described as "creepy but cute" and has widespread popularity. Official merchandise has sold out within minutes of release and fan art has been widely shared on social media platforms. Attendees at Comiket have cosplayed as Myaku-Myaku.

== See also ==
- List of World's Fair mascots
- Expo 2025
- Yuru-chara
