= Japan Association for the 2005 World Exposition =

Japan Association for the 2005 World Exposition is the association which held Expo 2005 in Japan.

== Outline ==
- Foundation: October 23, 1997
- Office: Nagoya, Japan
- Honorary president: Naruhito, Crown Prince of Japan
- President: Shoichiro Toyoda (honorary president of Toyota Motor Corporation(TMC), the 6th president of TMC, director of Global Industrial and Social Progress Research Institute(GISPRI), a Japanese think tank)
- Secretary General: Toshio Nakamura (director of GISPRI)
- Dissolution: December 31, 2006

The association's tasks were succeeded by Global Industrial and Social Progress Research Institute (GISPRI) from March, 2007.
