= Cours-la-Reine =

Public park in Paris, France

Coordinates: 48°51′53″N 2°18′52″E

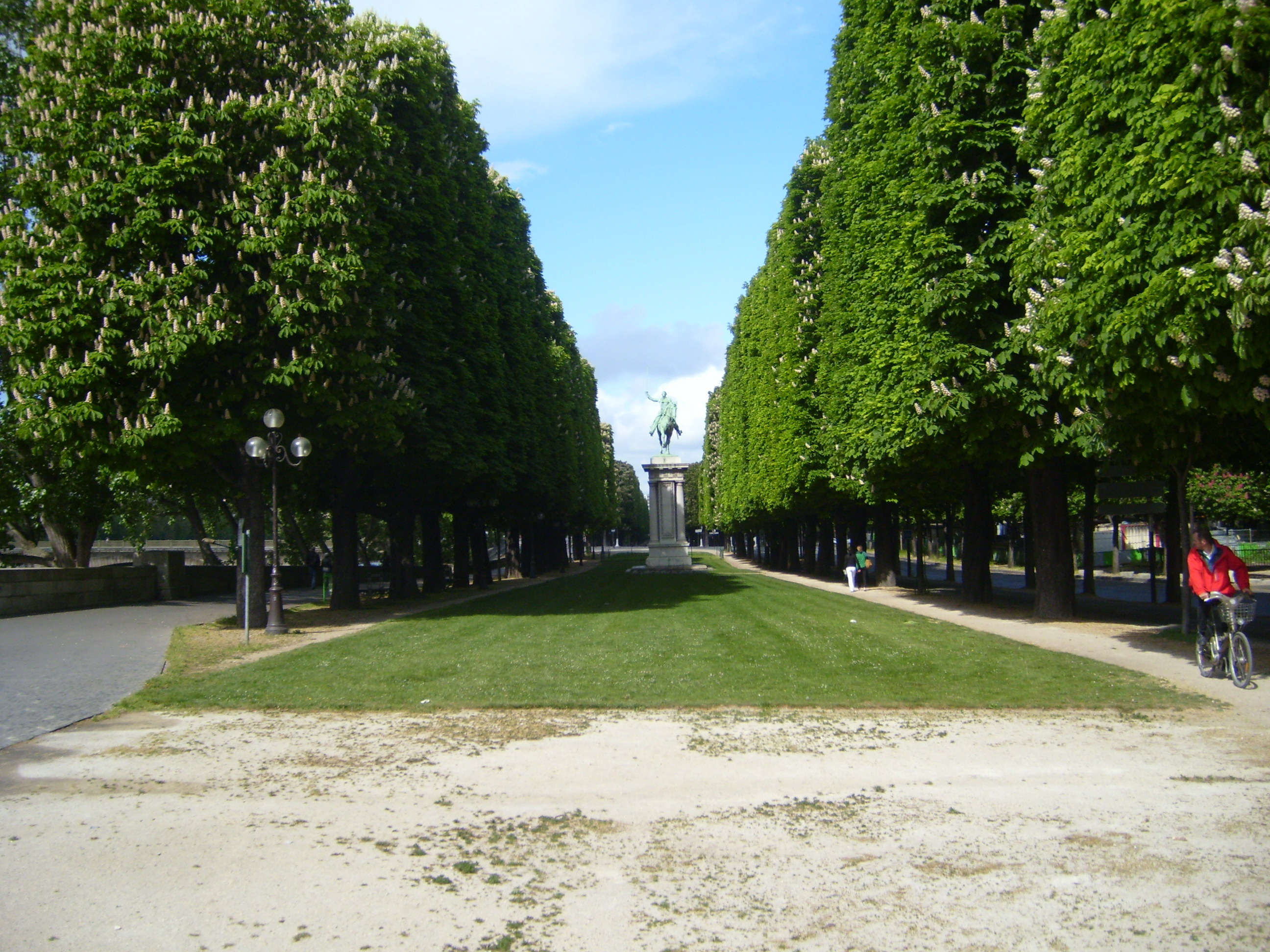
Cours-la-Reine

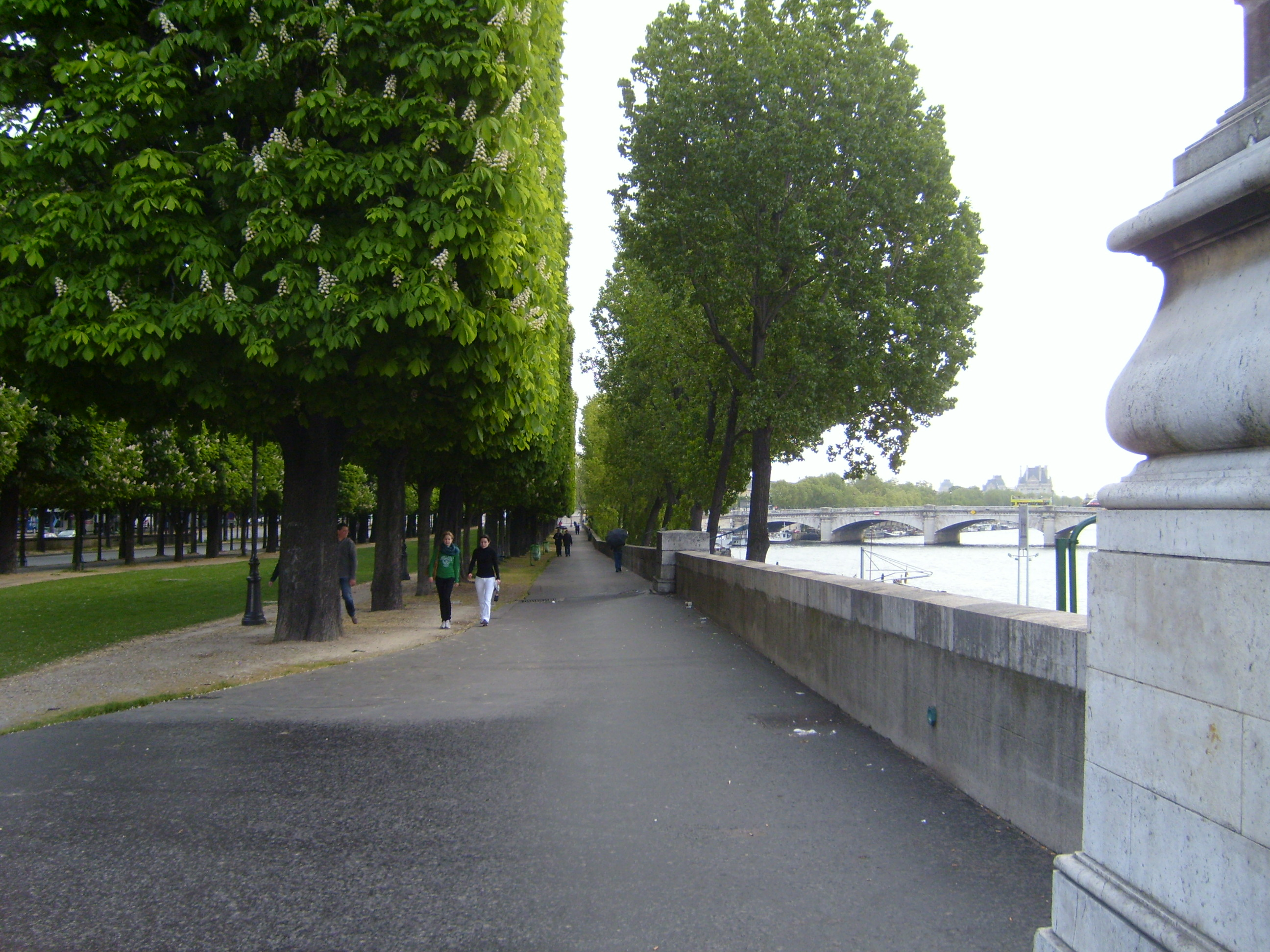
Cours-la-Reine

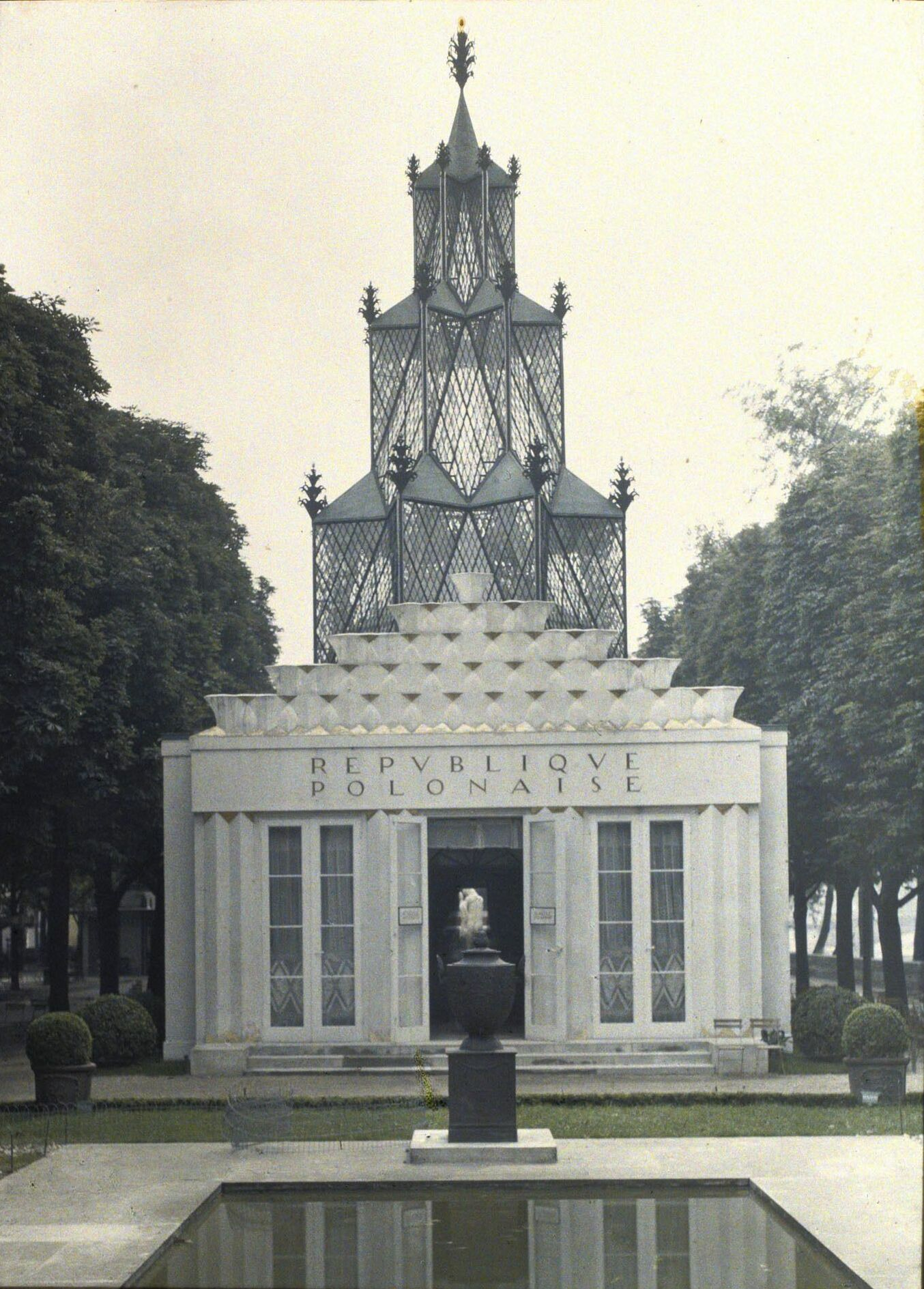
Poland's pavilion in Cours-la-Reine during the expo in Paris, 1925

The Cours-la-Reine, also spelled Cours la Reine (without hyphens), is a public park and garden promenade located along the River Seine, between the Place de la Concorde and the Place du Canada, in the 8th arrondissement of Paris. It is one of the oldest parks in Paris, created in 1616 by Queen Marie de' Medici. The further extension of the garden between Place du Canada to Place d'Alma is called the Cours Albert Premier.

== History ==
Queen Marie de' Medici, nostalgic for the gardens of her native Florence, created the Cours-la-Reine not long after she began making the Luxembourg Garden (1612–1630). At the time it was outside of Paris, on the way to Chaillot, through fields and marshes. The Queen built ornamental gates at either end of the kilometer and a half long garden and planted four rows of elm trees, with a wide lane in the middle. It became a popular meeting place for the nobility, where young aristocrats looked for husbands and wives of equal rank.

The garden was rebuilt in 1723, and the banks of the river were walled in 1769. Along with the Avenue des Champs-Élysėes, it formed one of the paths radiating out of the Place de la Concorde, like the three alleys radiating from the Palace of Versailles.

After World War I, the park was divided into two, and the part between Place du Canada and Place d'Alma was renamed Cours Albert Premier, after the King of the Belgians, France's staunch ally during the War.

In 1947 it was used, along with the Grand Palais, to host the 1947 International Exhibition on Urbanism and Housing.

== Description ==
The Cours la Reine is 6,800 square meters in area, and the Cours Albert Premier occupies 4950 square meters. They are currently planted with long rows of chestnut trees. The park contains several statues. One of King Albert I on horseback by Armand Matial (1938) and another of Simon Bolivar, as well as one by Antoine Bourdelle of the Polish poet Adam Mickiewicz, who was exiled to Paris, and finally an equestrian statue of Gilbert du Motier, Marquis de Lafayette by Paul Wayland Bartlett (1908), which was moved here when the space in front of the Louvre was remodeled.

== In culture ==
The Cours-la-Reine is the setting for the first scene of Act III of Jules Massenet's Manon.

40 Cours-la-Reine was the home and workshop of Rene Lalique from 1902 until his death in 1945 at the age of 85

== Bibliography ==
- Dominique Jarrassé, Grammaire des jardins Parisiens, Parigramme, Paris, 2007
- Philippe Prévôt, Histoire des jardins, Éditions Sud Ouest, Bordeaux, 2006
