= Toyota Partner Robot =

Robot by Toyota

The Toyota Partner Robots are a series of humanoid robots developed by Toyota. They debuted playing music on drums and trumpets at the 2005 World EXPO in Aichi, Japan. There are 5 robots in all, most of which have different movement systems. The 5 robots are: Version 1 (bipedal robot), Version 2 (Segway-like wheels), Version 3 (Segway-like wheels), Version 4 (unique wire system) and the i-Foot (mountable with 2 legs). In July 2009, Toyota released a video of the running and standing skills of their partner robot. The robot reaches 7 km/hour, however walking and running can only be achieved on flat surfaces. In 2017, Toyota released its third-generation of humanoid robots, T-HR3, which will be used in space travel.

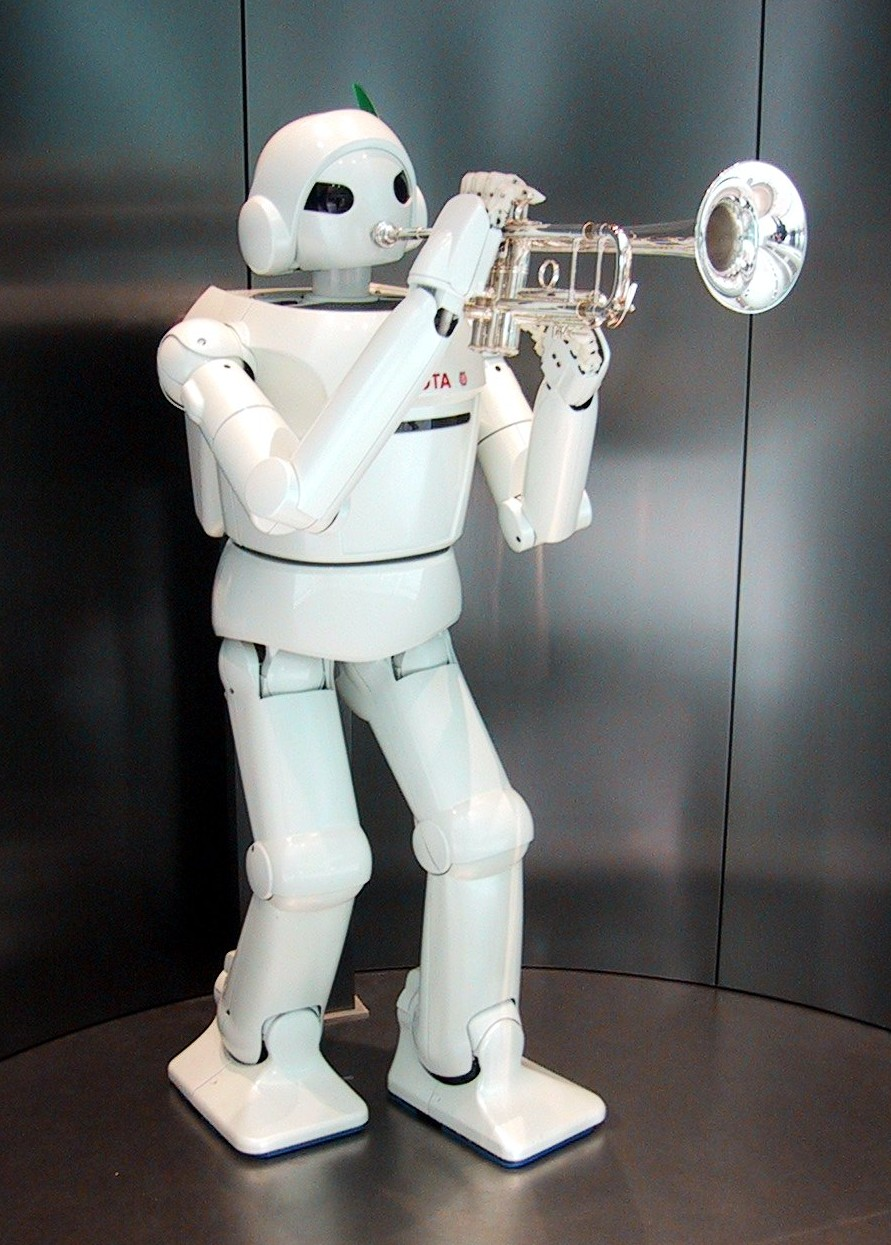
The walking type playing the trumpet

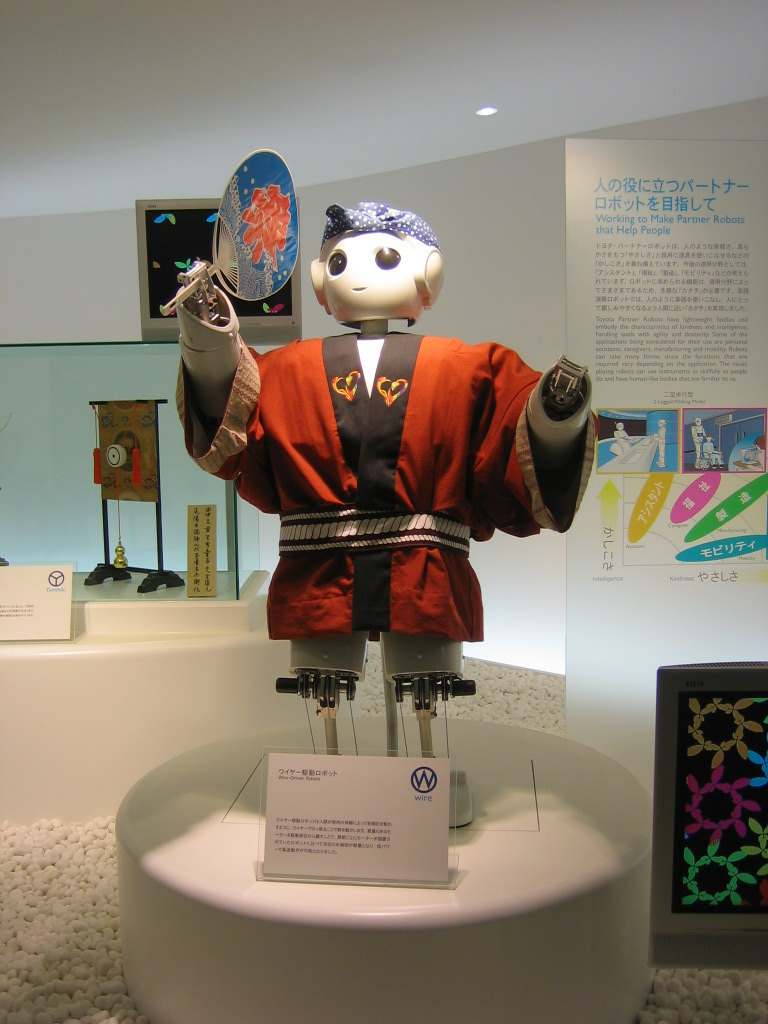
The wire type

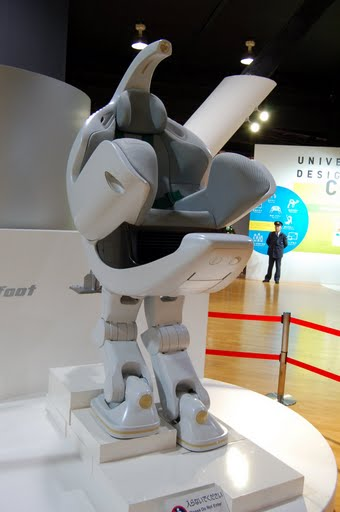
The i-Foot

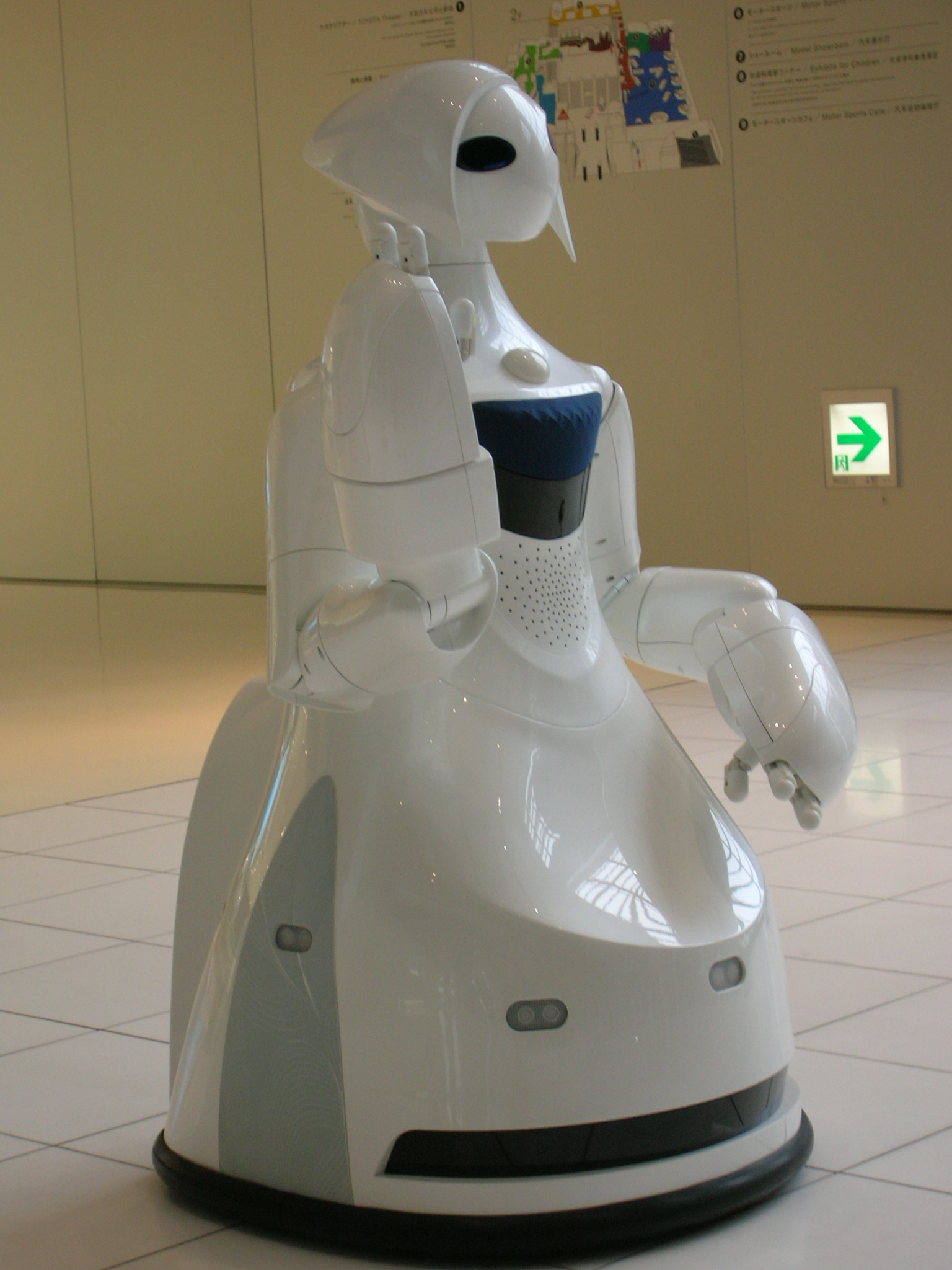
TPR-ROBINA
