= Expo '96 =

Coordinates: 47.4586°N 19.0555°E

Expo '96 was a canceled plan for a world's fair to be held in Budapest, Hungary, from 11 May to 4 October 1996. An earlier incarnation of the proposal was to be jointly hosted by Budapest and Vienna, Austria, in 1995, but Vienna left the project after a failed referendum in 1991. Hungary canceled the exposition altogether in 1994.

== Expo 95, Budapest and Vienna ==
Initially, the exposition was planned to be jointly hosted in 1995 by the two cities of Vienna (which had previously hosted the 1873 World's Fair) and Budapest. The cities' histories are intertwined, being connected by the Danube river and having been the twin capitals of the Austro-Hungarian Empire from 1867 to 1918. The exposition would have marked the 50th anniversary of Austria's independence from Nazi Germany and the 1,100th anniversary of the Hungarian conquest of the Carpathian Basin, traditionally dated to 895. The event was proposed as early as 1988, at which time Hungary was a Communist state separated from Austria by the Iron Curtain. The plan thus symbolized the growing autonomy of the Warsaw Pact states, whose affairs up until the late 1980s had been strictly controlled by the Soviet Union.

The Bureau International des Expositions (BIE), which is responsible for regulating world expositions, confirmed in May 1989 that the joint Budapest–Vienna project would receive its recognition, becoming the first World's Fair to be shared by two cities. In August of that year, at the Pan-European Picnic, the border between Austria and Hungary was temporarily opened for the first time in decades. Hungary made the policy permanent in September, allowing thousands of Eastern Europeans (predominantly East Germans) to freely travel to the West through its border. This precipitated the Revolutions of 1989 that included the establishment of multi-party democracy in Hungary in October and the fall of the Berlin Wall in November.

By the time the BIE officially awarded the 1995 exposition to the two cities in December 1989, the purpose of the fair had shifted from a call for cooperation between competing economic systems to a celebration of the end of Communism in Central Europe. The theme was to be "Bridges to the Future". The two countries proposed Hovercraft travel along the Danube and a magnetic levitation rail line which would bring visitors between the two cities in 1 1/2 hours. Bratislava, Slovakia, sitting between the two cities, expressed interest in joining the project. Vienna's fairgrounds were planned to be built in the area now known as Donau City.

After Gábor Demszky became the first post-Communist Mayor of Budapest in October 1990, he was skeptical of the Expo and asked for it to be postponed to 1996 so the city could review the costs of the project. In September 1991, approval of the project in Vienna was put to a public referendum, which was rejected by the voters. Viennese journalist Thomas Chorherr blamed the outcome on xenophobia against Hungarians and other Eastern Europeans, sparked by the growing crowds of tourists who since 1989 had started coming from the East and jamming Vienna's streets with traffic.

== Expo '96, Budapest ==
With Vienna pulling out of the joint plan, Budapest began preparing to host the world's fair alone. The Hungarian parliament authorized the organization of Expo '96 Budapest in 1991, and the BIE approved the altered proposal on 4 December 1992. The theme of Expo '96 was changed to "Communication for a Better World". Construction began on the 44-hectare (110-acre) fairgrounds, which were located in the Újbuda district along the west bank of the Danube, with plans for a pedestrian bridge connecting it to Pest on the east. The centerpiece of the circle-shaped grounds was to be a 180-meter sun disc, the symbol of Expo '96.

The Hungarian government committed to covering less than one-third of the Expo's costs. Parliament gave the Expo committee an additional 36 hectares (89 acres) of land near the fairgrounds which it could sell to raise revenue, but there was little demand for this real estate and sales were lower than expected. The fair had the support of the Boross Government and the Hungarian Democratic Forum party, which lost its majority coalition in the 1994 Hungarian parliamentary election. Less than two weeks after taking office, the newly elected prime minister Gyula Horn announced on 28 July 1994 that the exposition would be canceled, with legislation introduced in Parliament later that year to complete the withdrawal. Buildings which were already under construction were completed and then used for other purposes.
