= The International Exhibition of Rural Habitat =

1949 exposition in Lyon, France

1949 Lyon

Overview
- BIE-class: Specialized exposition
- Category: International specialized exposition
- Name: The International Exhibition of Rural Habitat
- Area: 110

Location
- Country: France
- City: Lyon

Timeline
- Opening: 24 September 1949
- Closure: 9 October 1949

Specialized expositions
- Previous: Universal Sport Exhibition in Stockholm
- Next: The International Textile Exhibition in Lille

Universal
- Previous: Exposition internationale du bicentenaire de Port-au-Prince in Port-au-Prince
- Next: Expo 58 in Brussels

The Exhibition of Lyon, themed "Rural Habitat" was a Specialised Expo recognised by the Bureau International des Expositions. The Expo's site was located on the grounds of the Foire de Lyon (Lyon Fair) in Lyon, France, and was open to visitors from 24 September to 9 October 1949.
