= The International Textile Exhibition =

1951 exposition held in Lille, France

1951 Lille

Overview
- BIE-class: Specialized exposition
- Category: International specialized exposition
- Name: Exposition Textile Internationale
- Building(s): Grand Palais de la Foire de Lille
- Area: 15
- Visitors: 1,500,000

Participant(s)
- Countries: 22

Location
- Country: France
- City: Lille

Timeline
- Opening: 28 April 1951
- Closure: 20 May 1951

Specialized expositions
- Previous: The International Exhibition of Rural Habitat in Lyon
- Next: EA 53 in Rome

Universal
- Previous: Exposition internationale du bicentenaire de Port-au-Prince in Port-au-Prince
- Next: Expo 58 in Brussels

The International Textile Exhibition of 1951 was held at the 'Grand Palais de la Foire de Lille' in Lille, France.

The palace, which was erected in 1932, but had been damaged during the Second World War, was remodelled in time for the Expo. Georges Bidault, Vice-President of the Council of Ministers and André Guillant, Secretary of State for Industry and Commerce, attended the opening ceremony of the Expo on 28 April 1951. Recognised by the Bureau International des Expositions as a Specialised Expo, the event welcomed delegates from 22 countries attracted 1.5 million visitors over a period of just three weeks, and was covered by 150 journalists.
