= Bureau International des Expositions =

Organization to supervise international exhibitions

Bureau International des Expositions International Exhibitions Bureau

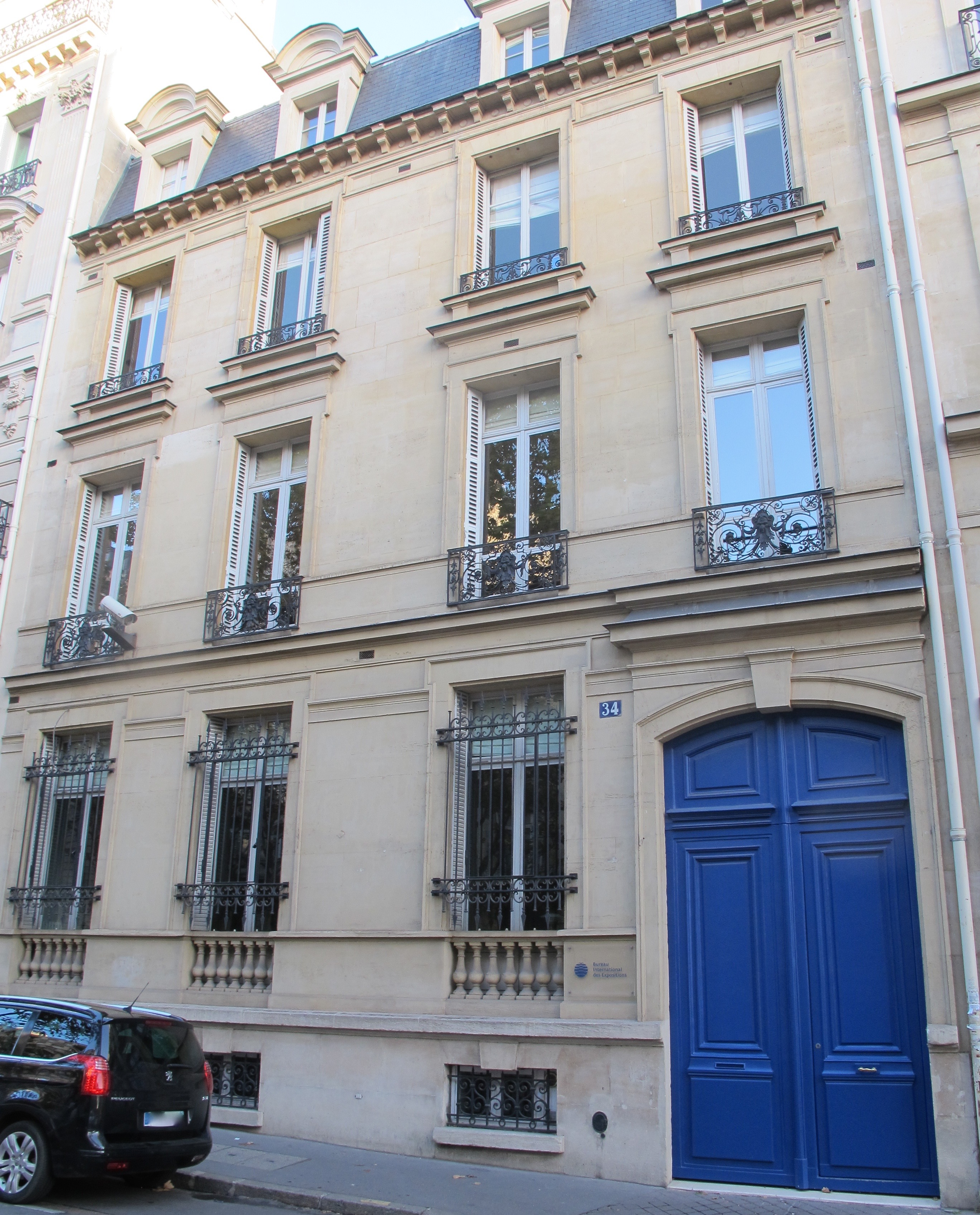
- Head office at 34 avenue d'Iéna (16th arrondissement, Paris)

- Member states as of May 2022
- Formation: 22 November 1928; 97 years ago
- Type: International exhibitions
- Headquarters: Paris, France
- Members: 184 members
- President: Alain Berger
- Secretary General: Dimitri S. Kerkentzes
- Website: www.bie-paris.org

The Bureau International des Expositions (BIE; English: International Exhibitions Bureau) is an intergovernmental organization created to supervise international exhibitions (also known as expos, global expos or world expos) falling under the jurisdiction of the Convention Relating to International Exhibitions.

== History ==
The BIE was established by the Convention Relating to International Exhibitions, signed in Paris on 22 November 1928, with the following goals:

- to oversee the calendar, the bidding, the selection and the organization of World Expositions; and
- to establish a regulatory framework under which Expo organizers and participants may work together under the best conditions.

The Convention stipulated that it would enter into effect one month after it was determined that at least seven countries had ratified it. This condition was met on 17 December 1930, and the first meeting of the Administrative Council of the BIE was held from 17–19 January 1931. At the meeting, it was agreed that the organization would have its headquarters in Paris.

The BIE was inactive during World War II. It was revived with a conference held on 10 May 1948, at which a new protocol was adopted to amend the Convention Relating to International Exhibitions. Further amendments were made in 1966, 1972, 1982, and 1988.

== Expo categories ==
The BIE regulates two types of expositions: Registered Exhibitions (commonly called World Expos) and Recognized Exhibitions (commonly called Specialized Expositions). The rules for each category define the duration, the frequency, the size, and the construction attributes of each Expo.

Under the original protocol of the 1928 Paris Convention, the BIE recognised two types of Expos:

- General Exhibitions (also known as World Expos), which were divided into:
  - 1st category
  - 2nd category
- Special Exhibitions (also known as Specialised Expos)

The Protocol of 30 November 1972 revised the original Convention, entering into force in 1980. Under these new rules, two types of Expos were recognised:

- Universal Exhibitions (also known as World Expos)
- Specialised Exhibitions (also known as Specialised Expos)

A new amendment was adopted in 1988 and ratified in 1996, further distinguishing the two types of Expos:

- International Registered Exhibitions (commonly referred to as World Expos)
- International Recognised Exhibitions (commonly referred to as Specialised Expos)

Expo 2008 in Zaragoza was the first Specialised Expo to be organised under these new rules, which continue to be in force to this day.

The BIE may also grant recognition to A1 Horticultural Exhibitions approved by the International Association of Horticultural Producers (AIPH) since 1960, and to the Triennale di Milano since 1933.

=== World Expos ===
According to the 1988 Amendment of the Convention on International Exhibitions, World Expos (formally known as International Registered Exhibitions) may occur every five years, and may last up to six months. Countries, international organizations, civil societies, and corporations are allowed to participate in World Expos. The themes of World Expos address a universal challenge facing humanity, and international participants may design and build their own pavilions. Participants may also opt to customise a pavilion provided by the Organiser or to participate within a joint pavilion, which has lower participation costs. Examples of themes of recent World Expos include "Man and His World" for Expo '67 in Montreal, and "Age of Discoveries" for Seville Expo '92, and examples of joint pavilion buildings for a Registered Exposition is the Plaza of America at Seville's Expo '92, which was constructed by the Seville Expo Authority to maximize participation at the World Expo by South American nations. The Plaza of Africa at Seville was constructed for the same purpose.

World Expos are also massive in scale, sometimes 300 or 400 hectares in size (Montreal's Expo 67 was 410 hectares, Osaka's Expo 70 was 330 hectares, Seville's Expo '92 was 215 hectares and Shanghai's Expo 2010, 528 hectares). Pavilions participating at a World Expo can also be large, sometimes 5,000 to 10,000 square metres in size, mini city blocks in themselves and sometimes more than several stories in height. (The Australia Pavilion for Shanghai 2010 was 5,000 square metres, the British Pavilion sat on a 6,000 square metres lot, as did the Canadian Pavilion. The flagship Chinese National Pavilion had 20,000 square metres of exhibition space.)

World Expos have been known to average 200,000 persons per day of visitors and some 50 to 70 million visitors during their six-month duration. Montreal's Expo 67 attracted 54 million visitors, Osaka's Expo '70, 64 million visitors, the Seville Expo '92, 41 million visitors and Shanghai's Expo 2010 attracted 70 million visitors.

As a result, transport and other infrastructure at a Registered Exposition is an important concern (Seville's World Expo of 1992 boasted cable car, monorail, boat, and bus) and the overall cost for hosting and being represented at a World Expos is quite high, compared to the smaller-scale Specialised Expos.

=== Specialised Expos ===
Specialised Expos (formally known as International Recognised Exhibitions) may occur between World Expos and may have a duration of between three weeks and three months. Countries, international organizations, civil societies, and corporations are allowed to participate but the theme of the Expo must address a precise challenge, e.g. Future Energy (Expo 2017 Astana), or Living Oceans and the Coast (Expo 2012 Yeosu). The pavilions are built by the Organiser and made available to participants who may customise them. The largest pavilion may be no larger than 1,000 square meters, and the Expo site must not exceed an area of twenty-five hectares. For this reason Specialised Expos are cheaper to run than World Expos.

There are blurred lines between Specialized and World Expositions prior to the 1996 amendment of the BIE's constitution. Some Specialized Expos, such as Expo 86 in Vancouver, Expo '85 in Tsukuba, or Hemisfair '68, ran for six months and pulled in greater attendance numbers than their 'World Expo' relatives. Many of these specialized expos also had individual pavilions for their participants or covered a greater exhibition site than other World Expos of the era. According to the new amendment, there were only two World Expos between 1970 and 1992 with over 12 Specialized Expos in that same period. Most of these indeed are smaller exhibitions on a focused theme, but some, such as Expo 86 and Expo 88, were intended as full-fledged World Expos. Others, such as Expo 74, the 1982 World's Fair in Knoxville, or Expo '85, were specialized exhibitions that were promoted as full World Expos.

== Organizational structure ==
Decisions, such as which city will host a future exposition, are made by the General Assembly of the BIE, which meets twice per year. Each member state has one vote in the General Assembly, and a quorum of two-thirds of the member states must be present for deliberations to begin. The General Assembly elects 12 members each to the Executive Committee, which examines applications from prospective Expo hosts and oversees the progress of Expos that are under construction, and the Rules Committee, which is responsible for establishing regulations that Expos must follow and examining the rules created by each Expo for itself. The BIE's other committees, which have nine members each and are not elected by the General Assembly, are the Administration and Budget Committee, responsible for the BIE's internal budget, and the Information and Communication Committee, which develops communication strategies for the BIE and advises Expo organisers on doing the same. Day-to-day management of the BIE's activities is conducted by the Secretariat, headed by the Secretary-General, who is chosen by the General Assembly.

=== List of General Assembly sessions ===
Below is a list of sessions of the General Assembly of the BIE. The General Assembly meets twice per year, typically either at BIE headquarters in Paris, in Monaco, or (since the onset of the COVID-19 pandemic) virtually via teleconferencing.

List of General Assembly sessions
No.	Dates	Activities
1	1931	
2	1932	
3	27 October 1932	Registered Brussels as host of Expo 1935
4	1933	
5	1934	
6	23 October 1934	Registered Paris as host of Expo 1937 and Stockholm as host of ILIS 1936
7	May 1935	
8	October 1935	
9	May 1936	
10	26–27 November 1936	
11	4 May 1937	Registered New York as host of 1939 World's Fair and Helsinki as host of Expo 1938
12	28 October 1937	Registered Liège as host of Exposition internationale de l'eau
13	4–5 April 1938	Registered Rome as host of Esposizione universale (1942)
14	1938 or 1939	
15	6 October 1939	
16	May 1940	
17	11 June 1946	Registered Paris as host of Expo 1947
18	December 1946	
19	June 1947	
20	December 1947	
21	June 1948	
22	5 December 1948	Registered Port-au-Prince as host of Expo 1949
23	13 June 1949	Registered Stockholm as host of Universal Sport Exhibition and Lyon as host of Exhibition of Rural Habitat
24	1949	
25	1949 or 1950	
26	1950	
27	1950	
28	13 November 1951	Registered Jerusalem as host of Conquest of the Desert
29	May 1952	
30	4 November 1952	Registered Rome as host of EA 53
31	15 May 1953	Registered Naples as host of The International Exhibition of Navigation
32	5 November 1953	Registered Brussels as host of Expo 58
33	3 June 1954	Registered Turin as host of The International Expo of Sport (1955)
34	4 November 1954	Registered Helsingborg as host of Expo 1955
35	May 1955	
36	8 November 1955	Registered Beit Dagan as host of Exhibition of citriculture
37	May 1956	
38	13 November 1956	Registered Berlin as host of Interbau 1957
39	May 1957	
40	November 1957	
41	May 1958	
42	November 1958	
43	5 May 1959	Registered Turin as host of Expo 61
44	November 1959	
45	1960	
46	1960	
47	8 November 1960	Registered Seattle as host of Century 21 Exposition and rejected New York as host of 1964 World's Fair
48	May 1961	
49	November 1961	
50	May 1962	
51	13 November 1962	Registered Montreal as host of Expo 67 and Munich as host of IVA 65
52	1963	
53	1963	
54	1963	
55	22 June 1964	
56	November 1964	
57	12 May 1965	
58	17 November 1965	Registered San Antonio as host of HemisFair '68
59	11 May 1966	Registered Osaka as host of Expo '70
60	November 1966	
61	May 1967	
62	November 1967	
63	9 May 1968	Registered Budapest as host of Expo 71
64	November 1969	
65	May 1969	
66	November 1969	
67	May 1970	
68	18 November 1970	Conditionally registered Philadelphia as host of the 1976 Bicentennial Exposition
69	May 1971	
70	24 November 1971	Registered Spokane as host of Expo '74
71	25 May 1972	Registered Okinawa as host of Expo '75
72	29–30 November 1972	Introduced the Protocol of 1972 amending the Convention Relating to International Exhibitions
73	May 1973	
74	29 November 1973	
75	20 June 1974	
76	4 December 1974	
77	30 April 1975	
78	11 December 1975	
79	28 April 1976	
80	17 November 1976	Conditionally registered Los Angeles as host of Expo '81
81	27 April 1977	Registered Knoxville as host of the 1982 World's Fair
82	14 December 1977	
83	5 July 1978	
84	14 December 1978	
85	June 1979	
86	December 1979	
87	12 June 1980	Registered Plovdiv as host of Expo 81
88	26 November 1980	Registered Vancouver as host of Expo 86
89	22 April 1981	Registered New Orleans as host of 1984 World's Fair and Tsukuba as host of Expo 85
90	9 December 1981	
91	24 June 1982	
92	8 December 1982	Registered Paris as host of Exposition Universelle (1989) and Chicago as host of 1992 World's Fair
93	15 June 1983	Registered Seville as host of Expo '92
94	7 December 1983	Registered Brisbane as host of World Expo 88
95	30 May 1984	Registered Plovdiv as host of Expo 85
96	December 1984	
97	June 1985	
98	December 1985	
99	June 1986	
100	December 1986	
101	June 1987	
102	December 1987	Registered Genoa as host of Expo '92
103	June 1988	
104	14 December 1988	Registered Plovdiv as host of Expo 91
105	June 1989	
106	December 1989	Registered Budapest and Vienna as joint hosts of Expo 95
107	14 June 1990	Elected Hannover as host of Expo 2000
108	12 December 1990	Registered Taejŏn as host of Expo '93
109	June 1991	
110	December 1991	
111	June 1992	
112	4 December 1992	Registered Budapest as host of Expo '96
113	June 1993	
114	5 December 1993	
115	8 June 1994	Registered Lisbon as host of Expo '98
116	December 1994	
117	June 1995	
118	December 1995	
119	5 June 1996	
120	December 1996	
121	12 June 1997	Elected Aichi as host of Expo 2005
122	December 1997	
123	5 June 1998	Registered Manila as host of Expo 2002
124	December 1998	
125	June 1999	
126	8 December 1999	
127	June 2000	
128	15 December 2000	Registered Aichi as host of Expo 2005
129	6 June 2001	
130	30 November 2001	
131	2 July 2002	
132	3 December 2002	Elected Shanghai as host of Expo 2010
133	June 2003	
134	December 2003	
135	23 June 2004	
136	16 December 2004	
137	27 June 2005	
138	1 December 2005	Registered Shanghai as host of Expo 2010 and Zaragoza as host of Expo 2008
139	30 June 2006	
140	18–19 December 2006	
141	18–19 June 2007	
142	27 November 2007	
143	31 March 2008	Elected Milan as host of Expo 2015
144	2 December 2008	Elected Yeosu as host of Expo 2012
145	2 June 2009	
146	24 November 2009	
147	1 July 2010	
148	23 November 2010	Registered Milan as host of Expo 2015
149	14 June 2011	
150	22–23 November 2011	
151	11–12 June 2012	
152	22 November 2012	Elected Astana as host of Expo 2017
153	11–12 June 2013	
154	26–27 November 2013	Elected United Arab Emirates as host country of Expo 2020
155	11 June 2014	Registered Astana as host of Expo 2017 and Beijing as host of Expo 2019
156	26 November 2014	
157	9 June 2015	
158	25 November 2015	Registered Dubai as host of Expo 2020
159	15 June 2016	
160	23 November 2016	
161	13–14 June 2017	
162	14–15 November 2017	Elected Buenos Aires as host of Expo 2023 and recognized Almere as host of Floriade 2022
163	12–13 June 2018	
164	22–23 November 2018	Elected Osaka as host of Expo 2025 and Doha as host of Horticultural Expo 2021
165	28 May 2019	
166	27 November 2019	
167	1 December 2020	
168	29 June 2021	
169	14 December 2021	
170	20–21 June 2022	
171	28–29 November 2022	
172	20–21 June 2023	Elected Belgrade as host of Expo 2027
173	28 November 2023	Elected Riyadh as host of Expo 2030
174	18 June 2024	
175	26 November 2024	
176	17 June 2025	
177	25 November 2025	

== Member states ==
As of 2026, 184 countries are member states of the BIE. Membership in the BIE is not required for a country to create a pavilion at an Expo, but only member states can vote to decide where Expos will be hosted, with each country receiving one vote. While membership is not technically required for a country to host an Expo, an event can only be awarded to a non-member state if there are no member states in the running and if the non-member state receives at least two-thirds of votes, making it unlikely in practice.

Before the competitive bidding process for Expo hosting sites was established, the BIE had only a few dozen members. Since then, candidate cities have encouraged most of the world's smaller countries to join the BIE in the hopes of getting their votes. In the weeks leading up to the June 1997 vote on the host city for Expo 2005, for instance, 31 countries joined the BIE for the first time and another four rejoined after previously allowing their memberships to lapse, bringing the total number of member states from 47 to 82. (Note: The list of new members in the cited sources includes Jamaica, whose delegation did not appear at the 1997 General Assembly to cast a vote, and the country is recognized by the BIE as officially joining for the first time in 2023.) Another 36 countries joined between September and November 2007, in advance of the awarding of Expo 2012, and 12 more followed in March 2008 in the weeks before the Expo 2015 vote.

Various member states have left the BIE, usually so that they could stop paying the organization's membership dues, which scale with the country's economic performance. Most of these have since returned to the organization. UN member states which have never been members of the BIE are Bhutan, India, Ireland, Liechtenstein, Luxembourg, Moldova, Myanmar, Papua New Guinea, and Singapore.

=== List of member states ===
Below is a list of member states with the dates of their accessions; former members are highlighted in grey.

List of member states
Member state	First accession	Withdrew from BIE	Second accession	Second withdrawal
Afghanistan	7 June 2012			
Albania	17 December 1930	13 June 1949	1 July 2008	
Algeria	2 June 1997			
Andorra	3 December 2004			
Angola	25 November 2011			
Antigua and Barbuda (Note: As part of the British Empire, the Convention Relating to International Exhibitions began applying to this former territory as of 15 December 1950, although it was not a member of the BIE in its own right.)	15 May 1997			
Argentina	7 December 1982			
Armenia	25 March 2008			
Australia	30 January 1935	18 August 1944	27 September 1973	2015
Austria	8 December 1947			
Azerbaijan	19 March 2008			
Bahamas (Note: As part of the British Empire, the Convention Relating to International Exhibitions began applying to this territory as of 22 October 1951, although it was not a member of the BIE in its own right.)	21 May 1997			
Bahrain	9 November 2007			
Bangladesh	6 June 1997			
Barbados	26 May 1997			
Belarus (Note: Joined as Byelorussian Soviet Socialist Republic.)	30 March 1960			
Belgium	15 April 1931			
Belize	12 May 1997			
Benin	18 September 2012			
Bolivia	7 December 1982	Unknown		
Bosnia and Herzegovina	25 March 2008			
Botswana	17 April 2023			
Brazil	5 November 1970	24 July 1980	17 May 1999	
Brunei	20 April 2023			
Bulgaria	31 March 1960			
Burkina Faso	25 March 2008			
Burundi	21 March 2008			
Cambodia	9 April 1997			
Cameroon	8 October 2013			
Canada	22 May 1934	1 August 1944	21 December 1957	2012
Cape Verde	5 October 2022			
Central African Republic	26 March 2008			
Chad	24 May 2013			
Chile	7 December 1982	17 December 1987	22 November 2007	
China	3 May 1993			
Colombia	6 June 1997			
Comoros	12 October 2007			
Cook Islands	3 April 2023			
Costa Rica	23 November 1982			
Croatia	14 March 2003			
Cuba	17 November 1982			
Cyprus (Note: As part of the British Empire, the Convention Relating to International Exhibitions began applying to this former territory as of 17 April 1951, although it was not a member of the BIE in its own right.)	4 November 1999			
Czech Republic	19 June 1995			
Czechoslovakia	9 January 1932	29 December 1950	1 April 1960	Unknown
Democratic Republic of the Congo	28 September 2007			
Denmark	26 March 1932			
Djibouti	11 October 2007			
Dominica	5 June 1997			
Dominican Republic	22 November 2007			
Ecuador	18 May 2007			
Egypt	22 November 2007			
El Salvador	7 December 1982	5 October 1987	20 May 1997	
Equatorial Guinea	17 December 2004			
Eritrea	12 March 2008			
Estonia	15 May 2009			
Eswatini	14 November 2007			
Ethiopia	1 February 2023			
Federated States of Micronesia	30 March 2023			
Fiji	8 November 2007			
Finland	3 July 1937			
France	17 December 1930			
Gabon	17 September 2007			
Gambia	22 November 2007			
Georgia	18 March 2008			
Germany (Note: As the Federal Republic of Germany from 1956 to 1990.)	17 December 1930	Unknown	1 April 1956	
East Germany	15 February 1974	Unknown		
Ghana	14 November 2007			
Greece	21 January 1933			
Grenada	5 June 1997			
Guatemala	18 October 2007	14 August 2020	25 April 2024	
Guinea	5 November 2007			
Guinea-Bissau	15 November 2007			
Guyana	26 May 1997			
Haiti	17 June 1949			
Honduras	9 November 2007			
Hungary	1 April 1960			
Iceland	22 January 1999			
Indonesia	5 June 1997			
Iran	14 November 2002			
Iraq	11 January 2023			
Israel	31 May 1952	18 February 1988	10 June 1997	
Italy	19 January 1931			
Ivory Coast	16 November 2007			
Jamaica	27 February 2023			
Japan	8 January 1965			
Jordan	10 December 2004			
Kazakhstan	4 June 1997			
Kenya	19 November 2007			
Kiribati	18 September 2007			
Kosovo	10 December 2015			
Kuwait	27 July 2007			
Kyrgyzstan	4 June 1997			
Laos	9 May 1997			
Latvia	31 January 2024			
Lebanon	15 September 1947			
Lesotho	26 October 2011			
Liberia	22 November 2007			
Libya	11 March 2008			
Lithuania	2 February 2009			
Madagascar	4 June 1997			
Malawi	5 October 2011			
Malaysia	18 April 1995			
Maldives	9 November 2007			
Mali	13 November 2007			
Malta	15 March 2000			
Marshall Islands	12 September 2007			
Mauritania	24 April 2002			
Mauritius	26 May 2008			
Mexico	7 December 1982	17 June 1994	7 April 1997	
Monaco	29 April 1958			
Mongolia	3 June 1997			
Montenegro	16 July 2012			
Morocco	14 January 1931			
Mozambique	9 April 2013			
Namibia	4 June 1997			
Nauru	5 June 1997			
Nepal	19 November 2007			
Netherlands	24 December 1932	26 October 1944	6 January 1951	
New Zealand	11 July 1950	1 October 1976	9 April 2013	
Nicaragua	7 December 1982			
Niger	5 October 2007			
Nigeria	2 January 1963			
North Korea	19 November 2007			
North Macedonia	26 May 2023			
Norway	24 December 1936			
Oman	4 February 1997			
Pakistan	4 June 2007			
Palau	3 June 1997			
Palestine	17 January 2023			
Panama	3 December 1982	19 October 1988	16 November 2007	
Paraguay	14 November 2007			
Peru	7 December 1982			
Philippines	12 August 1993			
Poland	18 July 1932	24 November 1950	1 April 1960	
Portugal	11 January 1932			
Qatar	9 April 1997			
Republic of the Congo	22 November 2007			
Romania	17 December 1930	Unknown	5 April 1960	
Russia (Note: Joined as the Soviet Union.)	12 November 1935	25 November 1947	8 July 1959	
Rwanda	20 March 2008			
Saint Kitts and Nevis	13 May 1997			
Saint Lucia	3 May 1997			
Saint Vincent and the Grenadines	25 April 1997			
Samoa	6 November 2007			
San Marino	5 October 2004			
São Tomé and Príncipe	5 December 2022			
Saudi Arabia	5 November 2007			
Senegal	22 November 2004			
Serbia	8 January 2010			
Seychelles	5 June 1997			
Sierra Leone	25 March 2008			
Slovakia	25 June 1993			
Slovenia	2 November 2004			
Solomon Islands	Provisional member	7 August 1981	8 November 2007	
Somalia	9 April 2013			
South Africa	1 September 1993			
South Korea	15 May 1987			
South Sudan	28 May 2013			
Spain	17 December 1930	17 March 1941	3 December 1971	
Sri Lanka	13 November 2007			
Sudan	3 March 2008			
Suriname	16 May 1997			
Sweden	17 December 1930			
Switzerland	17 December 1930			
Syria	2 July 2007			
Tajikistan	19 November 2007			
Tanzania	26 March 1963	19 August 1977	3 June 1997	
Thailand	24 March 1993			
Timor-Leste	19 November 2007			
Togo	10 June 1997			
Tonga	19 November 2007			
Trinidad and Tobago	6 June 1997	22 June 2011	26 May 2023	
Tunisia	17 December 1930			
Turkey	5 October 2004			
Turkmenistan	16 September 2012			
Tuvalu	12 September 2007			
Uganda	11 June 1997			
Ukraine (Note: Joined as the Ukrainian Soviet Socialist Republic.)	30 March 1960			
United Arab Emirates	6 June 1997			
United Kingdom	17 December 1930	16 June 1944	2 September 1949	
United States	24 May 1968	27 April 2001	10 May 2017	
Uruguay	10 June 1983			
Uzbekistan	2 June 1997			
Vanuatu	16 November 2007			
Venezuela	23 November 1982			
Vietnam	11 April 2003			
Yemen	5 June 1997			
Zambia	7 April 2015			
Zimbabwe	5 July 2021			

=== Former members ===
==== Australia ====
Australia was a signatory to the treaty and won the right to hold the 1988 World Exposition. In 2015 the Australian Chamber of Commerce and Industry requested that the Department of Foreign Affairs and Trade reconsider membership, as the cost was too high and "difficult to demonstrate an appropriate return on investment", and that membership be withdrawn temporarily in 2015. Australia is no longer listed as a member of BIE.

==== Canada ====
On 16 October 2012, the Conservative government ended Canada's membership of the BIE when the federal government cancelled its $25,000 per year membership fee as part of "reviewing all spending across government with the aim of reducing the deficit and returning to balanced budgets".

=== Rejoined members ===
==== United States (non-member 2001–2017) ====
Five International Exhibitions have been sanctioned by the BIE in the United States since World War II: one in the World Expo category—the Century 21 Exposition in Seattle (1962)—and four in the Specialized Expo category—HemisFair '68 in San Antonio; Expo '74 in Spokane, Washington; the 1982 World's Fair in Knoxville, Tennessee; and the 1984 Louisiana World Exposition in New Orleans. The 1964 New York World's Fair was held without receiving approval from the BIE.

The United States' membership in the BIE was revoked in June 2001 due to non-allocation of funds by the U.S. Congress for two years. The withdrawal of the United States from the BIE had a limited impact on the BIE and on the participation of the United States in International Exhibitions: the country hosted pavilions at World Expo 2005 in Aichi Prefecture, Japan; World Expo 2010 in Shanghai, China; Specialised Expo 2012 in Yeosu, South Korea; and World Expo 2015 in Milan, Italy. However, the withdrawal "had strong, adverse consequences for states and localities that wish to host an exposition on U.S. soil. Organizers in at least four states have prepared bids, or are exploring the possibility of preparing bids to host a BIE-affiliated expo." In each case, the bid project was unsuccessful, with non-membership of the BIE hurting the chances of a U.S. bid moving forward.

The U.S. rejoined the organization on 10 May 2017 after President Trump signed the "U.S. Wants to Compete for a World Expo Act" (HR534) into law (Pub.L. 115-32) as Minnesota was looking to host a Specialized Expo in 2023.

== Expo mascots ==
Fictional characters serving as mascots have been used since 1984, starting with Seymore D. Fair as the official mascot of the 1984 Louisiana World Exposition (the name being a pun on "see more of the fair", stemming from the local New Orleans dialect). Seymore D. Fair was followed by many more character mascots over the years, including Curro in Seville Expo '92; Twipsy at Expo 2000 in Hanover; and Haibao at Expo 2010 in Shanghai. The names and designs of Expo mascots are often intended to reflect the exposition's host city in some way.

== Symbols ==
Dvořák Symphony No. 9, "From the New World", Movement IV: "Allegro con fuoco"

The anthem of the Bureau International des Expositions (BIE) is the starting part of the 4th Movement of Dvořák's Symphony No. 9 in E Minor "From the New World".

== See also ==
- List of world expositions – an annotated list of all Expos sanctioned by the Bureau International des Expositions (BIE)
- List of world's fairs – comprehensive chronological list of world's fairs including fairs not sanctioned by the Bureau International des Expositions (BIE)
