= Expo 2005 =

World expo held in Aichi Prefecture, Japan

2005 Aichi Prefecture

Overview
- BIE-class: Universal exposition
- Category: International Registered Exhibition
- Name: Ai-chikyūhaku (愛・地球博)
- Motto: Nature's Wisdom
- Area: 173 hectares (430 acres)
- Invention(s): ASIMO
- Visitors: 22,049,544
- Mascot: "Morizo" Forest Grandfather and "Kiccoro" Forest Child

Participant(s)
- Countries: 122
- Organizations: 4

Location
- Country: Japan
- City: Aichi Prefecture
- Venue: Seto and Nagakute
- Coordinates: 35°10′34.2″N 137°5′26.5″E

Timeline
- Bidding: 1988
- Awarded: June 12, 1997
- Opening: March 25, 2005
- Closure: September 25, 2005

Universal expositions
- Previous: Expo 2000 in Hannover
- Next: Expo 2010 in Shanghai

Specialized expositions
- Previous: Expo '98 in Lisbon
- Next: Expo 2008 in Zaragoza

Horticultural expositions
- Previous: Expo 2003 in Rostock
- Next: Expo 2006 in Chiang Mai

Expo 2005 (2005年日本国際博覧会, Nisengo-nen Nippon Kokusai Hakurankai) was a world expo held for 185 days between Friday, March 25 and Sunday, September 25, 2005, in Aichi Prefecture, Japan, east of the city of Nagoya. Japan has also hosted Expo '70 Osaka (World Expo), Expo '75 Okinawa (Specialised Expo), Expo '85 Tsukuba (Specialised Expo), Expo '90 Osaka (Horticultural Expo) and Expo 2025 Osaka (World Expo).

The site of the expo would become the Expo 2005 Aichi Commemorative Park after it ended and is now the home of Ghibli Park.

== Bidding process ==
Expo 2005 was awarded to Nagoya during a meeting of the Bureau International des Expositions (BIE) General Assembly in Monaco on June 12, 1997. Nagoya received 53 votes while the other candidate city, Calgary in Canada, received 27. The Australian city of Gold Coast had been a candidate as well, but decided in March 1997 to bid for Expo 2002 instead. In the weeks leading up to the decision, promoters for both Calgary and Nagoya recruited countries to sign the Convention Relating to International Exhibitions and become members of the BIE so they could vote for the Expo 2005 host. The BIE grew from 47 member states in late April 1997 to 82 on June 12, including three countries which joined on the day of the vote.

== Theme ==
The theme of the Expo was "Nature's Wisdom", with national and corporate pavilions expressing themes of ecological co-existence, renewable technology, and the wonders of nature. In Japanese, this is rendered as Ai-chikyūhaku (愛・地球博), which means (roughly) "Love the Earth Expo," as well as being a play on the name of the host prefecture, 愛知 (Aichi). According to the official website:

We must come together and share our experience and wisdom, in order to create a new direction for humanity which is both sustainable and harmonious with nature.

== Location ==
The main site of the Expo was a forested area in Nagakute, east of Nagoya, covering an area of about 1.73 square kilometres (430 acres). A smaller area of 0.15 square kilometres (37 acres) nearby, accessible by gondola from the main site near Seto was also part of the Expo. Great care was taken to build the pavilions out of recycled or recyclable materials, to minimize environmental impact on the site, and to provide environmentally friendly transportation to and within the Expo area.

The cost of the Expo has been estimated at 340 billion yen ($3.3 billion). However, the recorded 22,049,544 visitors greatly exceeded the target of 15,000,000 and the Expo made a profit of over 10 billion yen.

The nearby city of Toyota also held some related events, although there was no special area set aside.

The area in Nagakute can be reached from Nagoya by subway (Higashiyama line) to the last stop in Fujigaoka, followed by a ride on the newly built Linimo magnetic levitation train.

== Participants ==
122 participating countries set a date for their own pavilions.

Country	Receipt of announcement for	Location	National day	Aichi Hospitality partner	Participation	(common)
Angola	2003-03-17	5	September 6	Haruhi Town		
Argentina	2003-01-08	2	July 11	Okazaki City		
Armenia	2003-06-17	4	June 7	Tsukude Village		
Australia	2003-07-16	6	April 21	Anjo City	(Japanese only)	Obu City
Austria	2003-05-14	4	April 27	Kozakai Town		
Azerbaijan	2003-04-14	4	May 17	Shippo Town		
Bangladesh	2004-04-18	1	June 9	Nisshin City		
Belgium	2003-01-23	4	June 14	Nagakute Town		
Belize	2003-02-21	2	August 19 (SICA)	Miyoshi Town	(Japanese only)	
Benin	2001-10-11	5	September 21	Ichinomiya Town		
Bhutan	2001-06-20	1	June 2	Handa City		
Bolivia	2001-05-11	2	August 5	Toei Town		
Bosnia and Herzegovina	2003-06-09	3		Ichinomiya City		
Brunei Darussalam	2003-7-19	6	May 18	Takahama City	(Japanese only)	
Bulgaria	2002-10-28	4	May 13	Toyoake City		
Burkina Faso	2003-06-19	5	June 16	Konan City		
Burundi	2001-12-21	5	September 12	Isshiki Town	(Japanese only)	
Cambodia	2002-10-09	6	May 10	Kota Town	(Japanese only)	
Cameroon	2001-12-26	5	June 21	Tsushima City		
Canada	2001-05-02	2	April 5	Kasugai City	(English) (Portuguese) (Chinese) (Filipino)	Kariya City
Chad	2001-08-29	5	June 8	Aisai City		
China	2002-08-28	1	May 19	Toyohashi City		
Congo	2003-04-07	5	September 14	Seto City		
Costa Rica	2003-03-31	2	August 19 (SICA)	Tsugu Village	(Japanese only)	
Côte d'Ivoire	2002-07-05	5	August 3	Anjo City	(Japanese only)	
Croatia	2003-05-27	3	April 12	Hekinan City		
Cuba	2002-05-09	2	July 26	Iwakura City		
Czech Republic	2002-01-04	4	June 24	Otowa Town		
Democratic Republic of Congo	2003-02-04	5	May 31	Obu City		
Denmark	2003-06-13	4	April 20	Anjo City	(Japanese only)	
Djibouti	2002-12-26	5	June 28	Kariya City		
Dominican Republic	2003-02-06	2	May 25	Atsumi Town		
Ecuador	2003-06-30	2	August 10	Komaki City	(Japanese only)	
Egypt	2003-01-14	5	July 22	Kira Town	(Japanese only)	
El Salvador	2003-03-31	2	August 19 (SICA)	Nishiharu Town		
Eritrea	2004-01-30	5	June 10	Inuyama City		
Ethiopia	2003-03-03	5	May 16	Horai Town		
Fiji	2003-11-24	6	June 22	Taketoyo Town	(Japanese only)	
Finland	2003-06-25	4	May 12	Toyota City	(English) (Portuguese) (Spanish)	
France	2002-03-27	3	April 14	Seto City Jushiyama Village		
Gabon	2003-03-07	5	July 12	Aisai City		
Georgia	2002-04-23	4	September 22	Kasugai City	(English) (Portuguese) (Chinese) (Filipino)	
Germany	2002-09-20	3	April 13	Inuyama City. Toyohashi City		
Ghana	2001-09-02	5	June 30	Ichinomiya Town		
Greece	2002-10-15	3	May 20	Inazawa City	(Japanese only)	
Guatemala	2003-03-24	2	August 19 (SICA)	Handa City		
Guinea	2001-10-19	5	August 26	Inazawa City	(Japanese only)	
Honduras	2003-06-13	2	August 19 (SICA)	Toyohashi City		
Iceland	2003-06-17	4	July 15	Chiryu City		
India	2001-12-10	1	July 20	Kariya City		
Indonesia	2002-08-06	6	August 17	Togo Town	(Japanese only)	
Iran	2002-05-29	1	April 1	Jushiyama Village		
Ireland	2003-07-18	4	March 31	Kiyosu City	(Japanese only)	
Italy	2003-05-21	3	April 28	Ichinomiya City		
Jordan	2002-11-27	3	July 5	Kasugai City	(English) (Portuguese) (Chinese) (Filipino)	
Kazakhstan	2002-11-11	1	June 15	Toyota City	(English) (Portuguese) (Spanish)	
Kenya	2002-04-15	5	August 18	Higashiura Town	(Japanese only)	
Kiribati	2002-03-19	6	August 15	Ichinomiya Town Obu City		
Kyrgyzstan	2001-06-29	1	August 4	Tomiyama Village		
Laos	2002-01-14	6	June 13	Tahara City		
Libya	2003-03-24	3	April 7	Tahara City		
Lithuania	2002-04-10	4	July 6	Toyohashi City		
Madagascar	2003-04-01	5	May 30	Nukata Town		
Malaysia	2003-06-09	6	August 31	Tokoname City		
Mali	2003-05-05	5	September 1	Jimokuji Town		
Marshall Islands	2003-08-29	6		Tobisihma Village	(Japanese only)	
Mauritania	2001-08-22	5	July 14	Nishio City	(Japanese only)	
Mexico	2002-11-06	2	September 15	Toyota City	(English) (Portuguese) (Spanish)	
Micronesia	2003-11-27	6	August 22	Konan City		
Mongolia	2002-04-18	1	May 27	Kanie Town	(Japanese only)	
Morocco	2003-04-04	3	July 1	Toyoyama Town	(Japanese only)	
Nepal	2001-12-06	1	July 7	Toyota City	(English) (Portuguese) (Spanish)	
Netherlands	2003-09-05	4	April 19	Yatomi City	(Japanese only)	
New Zealand	2003-09-09	6	June 3	Ichinomiya City Nishio City	(Japanese only)	
Nicaragua	2003-03-20	2	August 19 (SICA)	Oguchi Town	(Japanese only)	
Nigeria	2003-04-10	5	August 23	Oguchi Town	(Japanese only)	
Norway	2003-07-03	4	April 11	Inazawa City	(Japanese only)	
Pakistan	2003-04-25	1	August 11	Tsushima City		
Palau	2003-07-29	6	July 8	Nissin City		
Panama	2003-06-13	2	August 19 (SICA)	Aisai City		
Papua New Guinea	2003-03-28	6	September 16	Toyota City	(English) (Portuguese) (Spanish)	
Peru	2003-03-28	2	July 28	Toyokawa City		
Philippines	2003-03-07	6	September 20	Toyokawa City		
Poland	2002-08-23	4	May 9	Gamagori City	(Japanese only)	
Portugal	2003-03-25	4	May 24	Oharu Town	(Japanese only)	
Qatar	2003-03-23	1	September 2	Chita City		
Republic of Korea	2002-03-08	1	May 11	Toyota City	(English) (Portuguese) (Spanish)	Shikatsu Town
Republic of China	2003-04-01	1				
Romania	2002-04-23	4	June 1	Minamichita Town		
Russian Federation	2002-05-28	4	June 17	Toyota City	(English) (Portuguese) (Spanish)	
Rwanda	2002-10-23	5	June 10	Kiyosu City	(Japanese only)	
Samoa	2003-06-13	6	August 30	Shitara Town	(Japanese only)	
São Tomé and Príncipe	2003-06-11	5	July 21	Tokai City	(Japanese only)	
Saudi Arabia	2001-08-08	1	September 9	Toyone Village	(Japanese only)	
Senegal	2003-03-06	5	April 8	Fuso Town	(Japanese only)	
Singapore	2001-10-13	6	August 9	Mihama Town	(Japanese only)	
Solomon Islands	2003-09-15	6	July 13	Agui Town	(Japanese only)	
South Africa	2003-08-13	5	April 26	Aisai City		
Spain	2001-05-24	3	July 25	Kiyosu City	(Japanese only)	
Sri Lanka	2002-05-28	1	July 27	Toyota City	(English) (Portuguese) (Spanish)	
Sudan	2003-10-12	5	August 16	Kasugai City	(English) (Portuguese) (Chinese) (Filipino)	Kariya City
Sweden	2003-06-26	4	April 6	Okazaki City		
Switzerland	2001-12-19	4	April 15	Shinshiro City	(Japanese only)	
Tajikistan	2003-04-07	1	September 13	Shikatsu Town		
Thailand	2003-03-10	6	August 12	Inazawa City	(Japanese only)	
Tonga	2003-01-15	6	July 4	Owariasahi City		
Tunisia	2002-12-19	3	June 23	Seto City		
Türkiye	2002-12-19	3	August 2	Tokai City	(Japanese only)	
Tuvalu	2003-12-29	6	August 15	Cita City		
Uganda	2001-05-24	5	September 7	Kiyosu City	(Japanese only)	
Ukraine	2002-11-12	4	August 24	Hazu City	(Japanese only)	
United Kingdom	2003-07-19	4	April 22	Toyota City	(English) (Portuguese) (Spanish)	
United Republic of Tanzania	2002-02-19	5	May 26	Komaki City	(Japanese only)	
United States of America	2003-11-18	2	June 20	Toyohashi City Toyota City	(English) (Portuguese) (Spanish)	Anjo City
Uzbekistan	2001-06-01	1	September 8	Ichinomiya City		
Vanuatu	2003-11-10	6	August 1	Gamagori City	(Japanese only)	
Venezuela	2003-04-11	2	June 29	Toyohashi City		
Vietnam	2002-09-16	6	September 5	Miwa Town		
Yemen	2002-05-06	1	May 23	Nishio City	(Japanese only)	
Zambia	2003-10-28	5	July 19	Okazaki City		
Zimbabwe	2003-07-14	5	April 18	Mito Town		

In regards to the companies and municipality, the ones who were presented are as follows:

- Wonder circus - Federation of Electric Power Companies.
- Superconducting Linear Hall - Central Japan Railway Company.
- Wonder wheel - Japan Automobile Manufacturers Association.
- Mitsubishi
- Toyota
- Hitachi
- Mitsui&Toshiba
- Mountain of Dreams - Chunichi Shimbun joint pavilion organizing committee.
- Fire magic theater - The Japan Gas Association.
- Japanese government
- Aichi Prefecture
- Earth Tower - City of Nagoya.
- Chubu community for Millennial Symbiosis - Chubu regional exhibition executive committee.
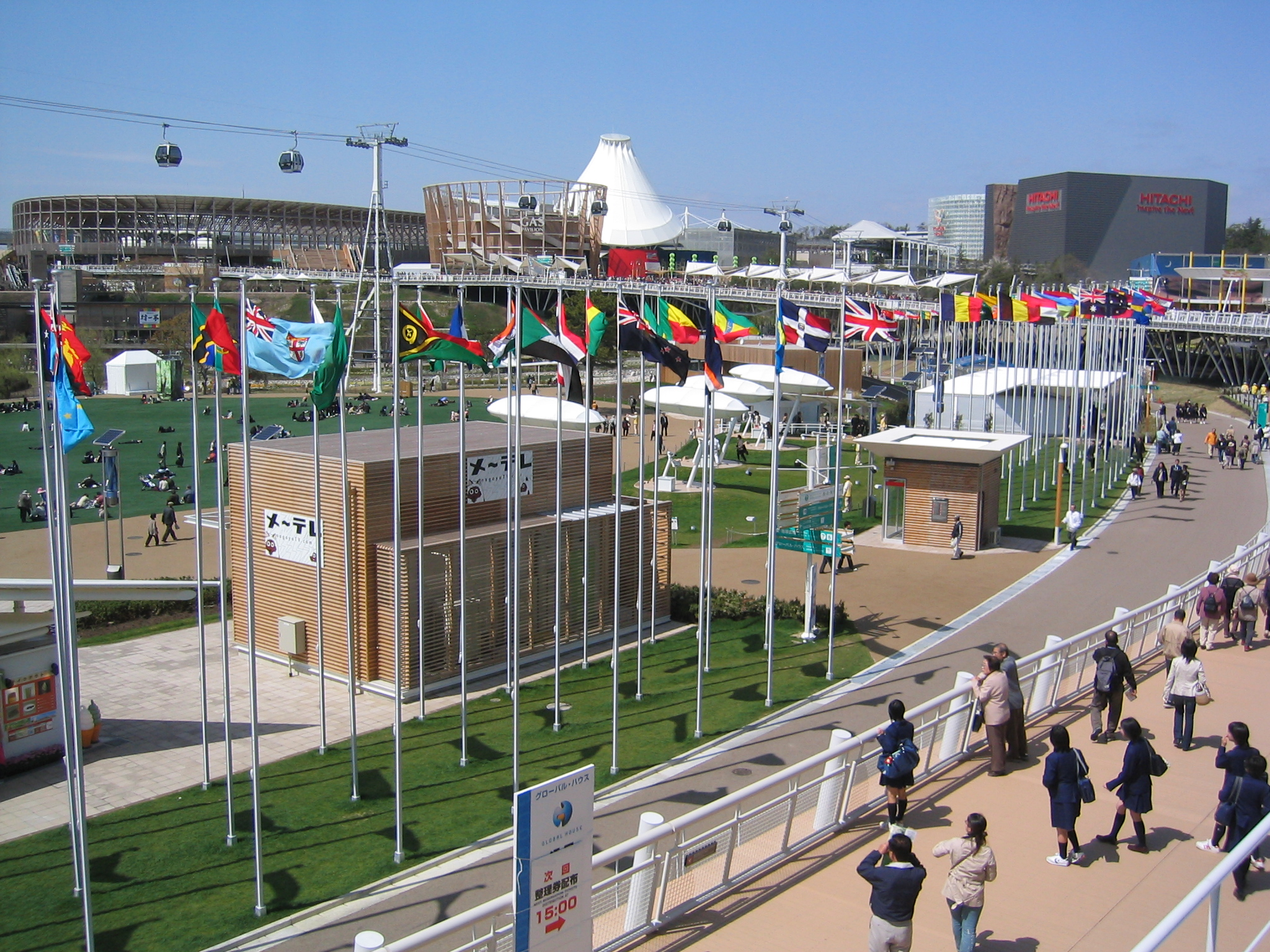
Expo with the corporate pavilions in the background

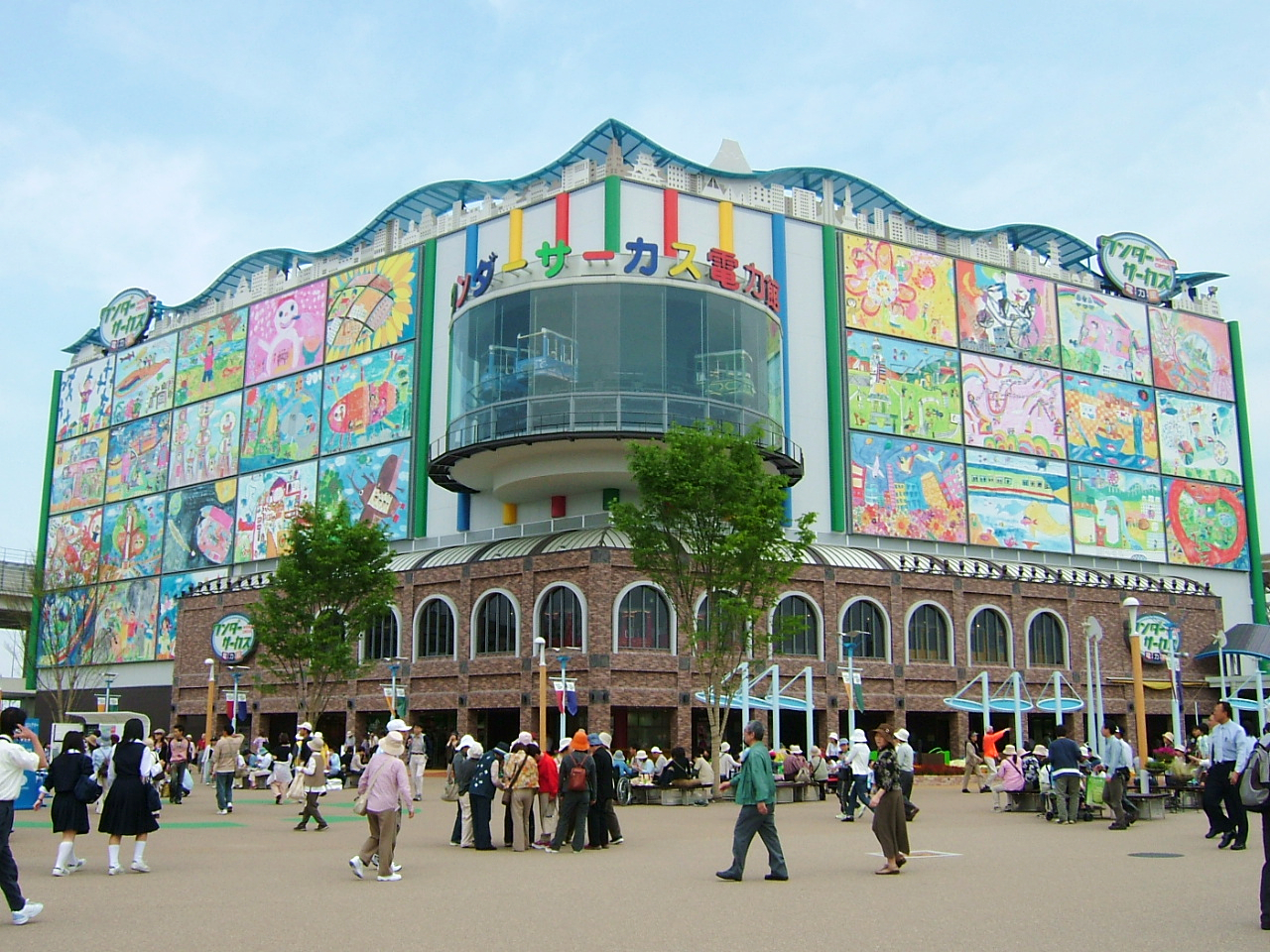
"Wonder Circus", the Electric Power Pavilion

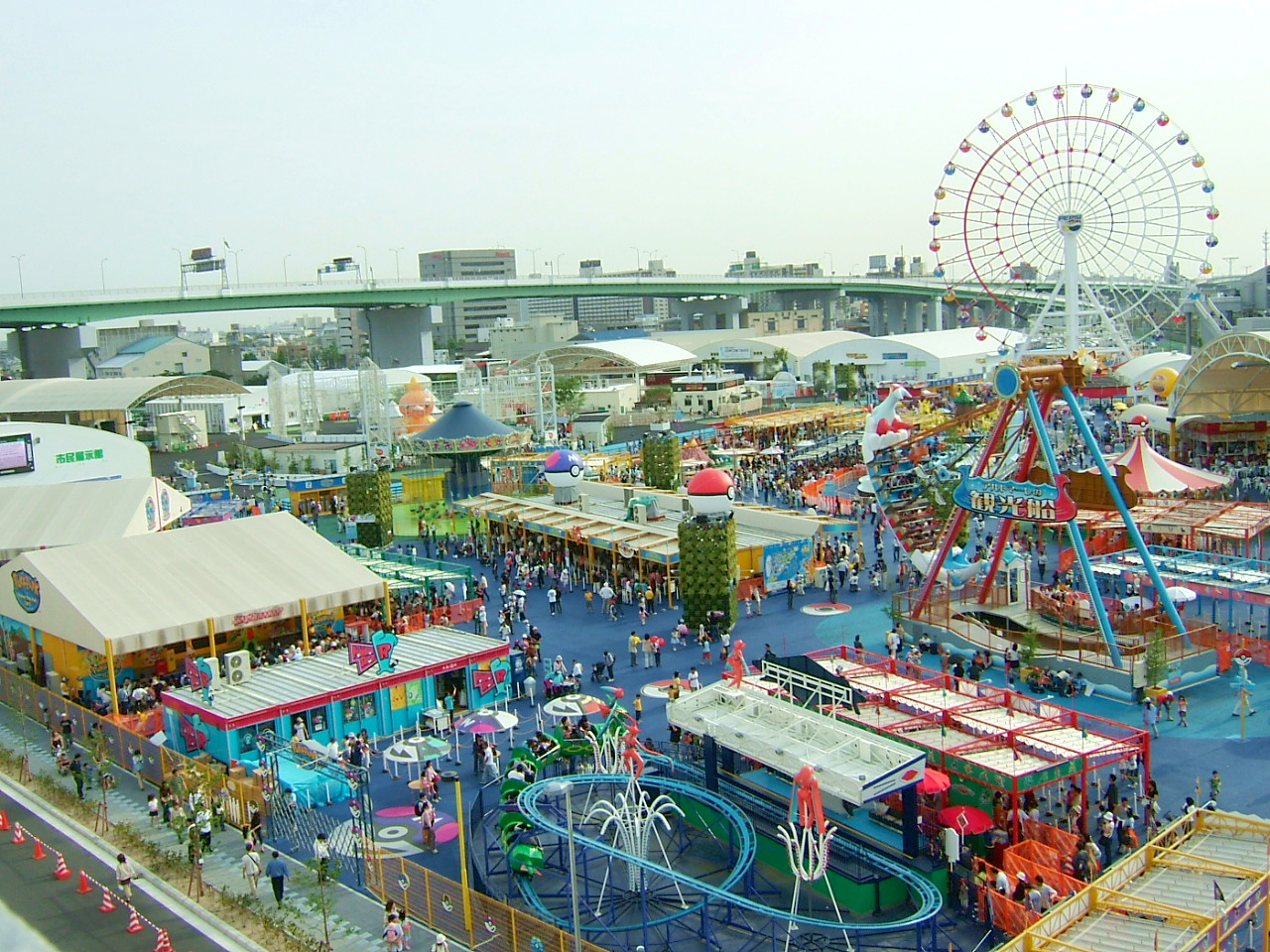
PokéPark 2005 at De La Fantasia

== Mascots ==
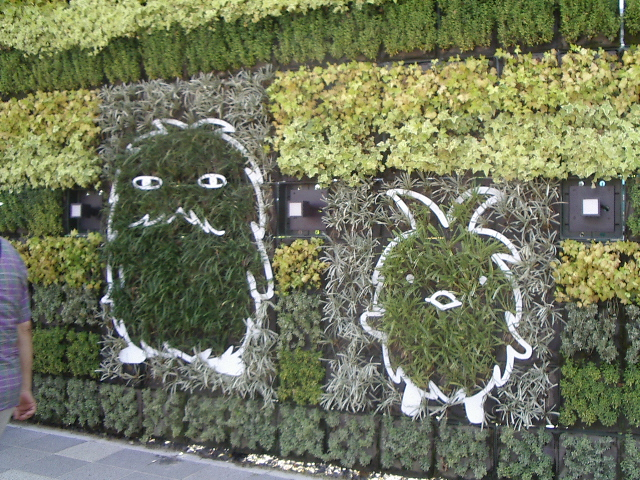
Morizo and Kiccoro on flower wall

Morizo (モリゾー) and Kiccoro (キッコロ), collectively known as "Moricoro," (モリコロ) were created to be Aichi Banpaku's mascots. The popular fluffy green creatures are both from the forest of Seto.

== Attractions ==
- "Satsuki and Mei's House," was a recreation of the house from Hayao Miyazaki's movie My Neighbor Totoro, and located inside the “Forest Experience Zone”. It re-opened to the public on July 15, 2006 and would spark the creation of an entire Ghibli Park, which opened in 2022.
- ASIMO, Honda's humanoid robot, was shown off at the Expo as one of its many public appearances.
- The Toyota Partner Robots made their debut.
- Chickens Suit a clothing range for chickens by Edgar Honetschläger made its debut with chickens on a runway.
- The Growing Village Pavilion featured a variety of tree shaping art work.
- The Franklin Spirit at the USA Pavilion, designed by award-winning experience designer Bob Rogers and the design team BRC Imagination Arts, presented the American statesman, Benjamin Franklin, using an innovative multi-plane 3D effect that suspended layered planes of digital media on stage, where Franklin visited the world of 2005 to celebrate his 300th birthday, as he discussed the pending advances in science, technology freedom and enterprise that will improve the lives of people worldwide.
- The Forest Experience Zone contains three areas, the ‘Nature School Forest’, ‘Satsuki and Mei’s House’, and the ‘Japanese Garden’. This forest explores the relationship between people and nature.
- The Street Art experience was performed in the park by multi artists, giants reproductions art exhibited open air. The French artist Gailord Bovrisse was one of them.

== Theme songs ==
The official theme song of the Expo was "I'll Be Your Love," composed by Yoshiki, and performed by Dahlia, an Okinawan-American musician (then aged 24) from Honolulu, Hawaii. On March 24, 2005, Yoshiki conducted an orchestra and performed the song for the opening ceremony of the Expo. Pop singer Ayumi Hamasaki also performed a classical version of her single "A Song Is Born" on the event's opening day.

== New transportation system ==
- Linimo - magnetic levitation train using trains from Chubu HSST Development Corporation
- Fuel Cell Hybrid Vehicle Bus (FCHV-Bus)
- Intelligent Multimode Transit System (IMTS)

== Holder ==
The holder was Japan Association for the 2005 World Exposition whose president was Shoichiro Toyoda, the honorary president of Toyota.

== See also ==
- List of world expositions
- Global Industrial and Social Progress Research Institute
- Solar Ark
- Chubu Centrair International Airport - Opened in accordance with the Aichi Expo.
- Nagoya Pan-Pacific Peace Exposition 1937
- World Design Exhibition 1989
