= Seymore D. Fair =

Seymore D'Fair
- First appearance: June 1, 1983
- Created by: 1984 Louisiana World Exposition
- Portrayed by: Jeff Davis (1983-84)

In-universe information
- Alias: Seymour D' Fair
- Species: White Pelican
- Gender: Male
- Family: Critters
- Nationality: American
- Home: Critter Club House

Seymore D'Fair (alternatively Seymour D'Fair, and sometimes called Seymore de Faire or Seymour d'Fair) is a cartoon animal and costumed character who was the official mascot of the 1984 Louisiana World Exposition. Seymore is an anthropomorphic white pelican who typically wears a blue tuxedo jacket, top hat, spats, and white gloves. His name is derived from the New Orleans phrase "see more of the fair". He was the first-ever character mascot in the history of World Expositions.

Seymore promoted the New Orleans World's Fair in Los Angeles, New York, Paris, and London. During the 1984 Republican National Convention, he interacted on stage with George H. W. Bush, Vice-President of the United States, and numerous Chiefs of State. In Washington, D.C., he met Billy Joel at the White House, entertaining wives of Russian diplomats.

== Name that Pelican! ==
For the first ten months after he was created, Seymore was referred to as Mr. Pelican. Later, fair management worked with a local convenience store chain to create a naming contest, which resulted in over 18,000 submissions. Judges included local celebrities such as reporters Angus Lind and Bob Marshall of the States-Item. The contest winner was Susan Shambra, a computer operator for a local insurance company. Susan stated that Seymore D'Fair's name, is a derivative of the local Yat dialect translation of "See More of the Fair."

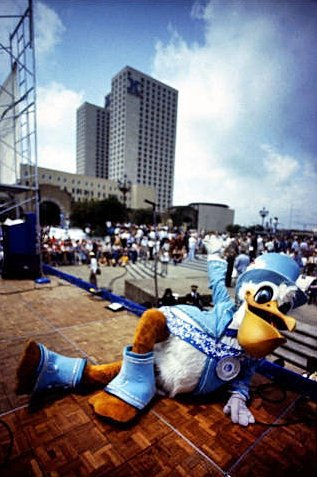
Seymore D. Fair is the first World Expo Mascot.

== Advocacy and education ==
Seymore's influence extended beyond appearances at the New Orleans World's Fair, as he actively contributed to educational, civic, and community initiatives. His efforts were particularly notable in promoting Substance-Free Lifestyles, Animal Welfare, and Positive Behavior programs. A highlight of his advocacy was in 1986 when he joined First Lady Nancy Reagan at the national "Just Say No" Rally, which took place in the Louisiana Superdome.

Motivated by the First Lady's anti-drug campaign, Seymore and his krewe, Critters Inc., Harry Lee, Jefferson Parish Sheriff and sponsors, including Al Copeland, owner of Popeyes Famous Chicken and Biscuits, joined together to develop a drug education initiative titled "Cajun Critters & Kids Just Say NO to Drugs." Launched in 1986, this initiative comprised a 45-minute live theater presentation and a classroom-based teaching unit. The program reached 110+ public, private, and parochial schools in the metro New Orleans area, engaging an estimated 40,000 K-6 students in the live theater presentation. At the time, Harry Lee, the Sheriff of Jefferson Parish, recognized this initiative as the largest single preadolescent drug education effort in the history of Louisiana.

== Honors and awards ==
At the end of the fair, Seymore was enshrined alongside Dorothy's ruby slippers in the Smithsonian's National Museum of American History. He was inducted into the New Orleans Historical Collection and the Louisiana State Archives. Seymore and his friends were appointed "Ambassadors of Goodwill" for the State of Louisiana by then Governor Edwin E. Edwards. Ernest Nathan Morial Mayor of New Orleans issued an executive proclamation 1986 designating January 24 as "Seymore D'Fair Day."

== The Seymore D'Fair Foundation ==
The Seymore D'Fair Foundation was established in 2015 to support community programs. Seymore’s Foundation is an "educator-centric" early childhood education advocacy group specializing in preadolescent drug awareness, education, and prevention. Seymore's Foundation supports learning institutions, health organizations, law enforcement, and communities to educate and protect the preadolescent student population from the dangers of drugs, alcohol, and tobacco use. Seymore's Foundation pursues this mission by developing and producing drug education curricula and activity-based prevention solutions targeting Kindergarten through 6th-grade students.

== See also ==
- Bureau of International Expositions
- Twipsy, the mascot for the 2000 Hannover World Exposition
- Haibao, the mascot for the 2010 Shanghai World Exposition
