= Exposition internationale du bicentenaire de Port-au-Prince =

World's fair held in Port-au-Prince, Haiti

Coordinates: 18.5494°N 72.3484°W

1949 Port-au-Prince
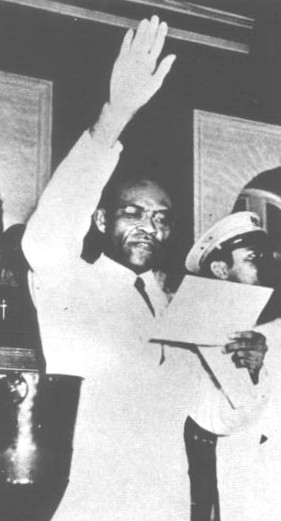
- Haitian president Dumarsais Estimé at the Expo

Overview
- BIE-class: Universal exposition
- Category: Second category General Exposition
- Name: L'Exposition Internationale de port au Prince 1949
- Motto: 200 years Port au Prince
- Area: 30 hectares (74 acres)
- Organized by: Dumarsais Estimé

Location
- Country: Haiti
- City: Port-au-Prince
- Venue: Gonave Bay

Timeline
- Bidding: 12 October 1948
- Awarded: 5 December 1948
- Opening: 1 December 1949
- Closure: 8 June 1950

Universal expositions
- Previous: 1939 New York World's Fair in New York City
- Next: Expo 58 in Brussels

Specialised Expositions
- Previous: International Exhibition on Urbanism and Housing (1947) in Paris
- Next: The International Textile Exhibition in Lille

Simultaneous
- Specialized: Universal Sport Exhibition (1949) in Stockholm and The International Exhibition of Rural Habitat in Lyon

The Exposition internationale du bicentenaire de Port-au-Prince was a World's fair held in Port-au-Prince, Haiti in 1949 to mark the 200th anniversary of the city's founding.

== Creation ==
President Dumarsais Estimé argued in 1948 for an exposition to demonstrate Haitian culture to other countries and encourage tourism and committed $1 million (then almost three-quarters of Haiti's annual budget) to the project.

Illustration of the Exposition internationale du bicentenaire de Port-au-Prince, showing the main fairgrounds at Gonave Bay.

The fair opened on ground at the Gonave Bay which had been cleared of houses and landscaped with gardens, parks and tall coconut and palm trees. Life Magazine dubbed the new development as the 'Little World's Fair'.

August Ferdinand Schmiedigen, an architect hailing from New York, oversaw construction of the Expo. He was previously involved in the Paris 1937 and New York 1939-1940 World's fairs. The Expo was divided by a boulevard named in honor of U.S. President Harry S. Truman and lined with Art Nouveau style buildings decorated with vibrant depictions of Haitian life. Additional development efforts included the construction of over a dozen hotels to accommodate the anticipated flood of tourists.

== Opening ==
There were two opening ceremonies: the first on 8 December 1949 and the second on 12 February 1950.

During the first ceremony, a telegram from US president Harry S. Truman to Haitian president Dumarsais Estimé was read out, a parade of US soldiers and marines and a US Air Force squadron flew overhead, and the national exhibits and amusement area opened.

During the second ceremony, the international as well as the official pavilions were opened. Displays were on show from Argentina, Cuba, France, Guatemala, Italy, Mexico and Venezuela, with Vatican City providing a chapel.

== Art and music ==
An art competition was held, with Gesner Abelard winning a bronze prize, and Jacques-Enguerrand Gourgue a gold.

Performers during the exposition included Marian Anderson, Alberto Beltran, Frantz Casseus, Celia Cruz, Miles Davis, Issa El Saeih, Dizzy Gillespie, Ernst Lamy, Ti Ro Ro, La Scala singers, members of the Grand National Opera New York, Daniel Santos, Don Shirley and Bebo Valdes.

== Participants ==
The following countries and territories were invited to and participated in the exhibition:

Europe

- France, which supported this project with its Minister of Foreign Affairs Robert Schumann
- Belgium
- Spain
- Italy
- San Marino
- Vatican City, for which a chapel was built.

Asia

- Lebanon
- Syria
- Palestine

America

- Canada
- United States
- Venezuela
- Mexico
- Argentina
- Guatemala
- Chile
- Puerto Rico
- Cuba
- Jamaica

International organizations

- United Nations
- Organization of American States.

== Legacy ==
Following the close of the exposition many of the pavilions were used for Haitian Governmental Buildings. The Pavilion of Haiti was converted into the Legislative Assembly Building. The Post Pavilion became a post office. The Guatemala Pavilion became the home of the Haiti Red Cross, and the Vatican Pavilion became a church. The devastating 2010 Haiti earthquake laid waste to many buildings in Haiti including most of these exposition buildings including the Legislative Building, Red Cross, and Post Office.
