= Chicago 1992 World's Fair =

Planned exposition

Overview
- BIE-class: Universal exposition
- Category: Cancelled
- Name: Age of Discovery
- Organized by: Chicago World's Fair – 1992 Authority

Timeline
- Opening: n/a
- Closure: n/a

Universal expositions
- Previous: Expo '70 in Osaka
- Next: Expo 2000 in Hanover

Specialized expositions
- Previous: Expo '85 in Tsukuba
- Next: Expo 91 in Plovdiv

Simultaneous
- Universal: Seville Expo '92

The Chicago 1992 World's Fair was planned to be held in Chicago as the first World's Fair to take place in the United States since the 1984 Louisiana World Exposition in New Orleans. The Bureau International des Expositions (BIE) approved Chicago's bid to host a World's Fair in 1982, but three years later the city withdrew its offer to host the event following the evaporation of political support and concerns that the event would not be able to recoup its expenses.

The fair would have been twinned with the coinciding Seville Expo '92.

== Background ==
Chicago had twice before hosted major worlds fairs, the World's Columbian Exposition in 1893 and Century of Progress from 1933 through 1934. The first of these predated the establishment of the Bureau International des Expositions, a sanctioning body for official worlds expositions, while the latter was formally sanctioned by it.

== Conception ==
Several architects, including Harry Weese, would later claim to have been discussing the idea ever since plans for a 1976 World's Fair in Philadelphia faltered. The idea for a World's Fair in Chicago to mark the 500th anniversary of Christopher Columbus' arrival in the "New World" first began to appear publicly in the late 1970s. The idea appeared in a 1977 newspaper article written by Charles Brubaker, vice-president of the architecture firm Perkins and Will. In 1978, officials from the City of Chicago indicated their interest in potentially hosting a future world's fair to the BIE.

By 1979, the idea took hold among a group of architects from the Chicago chapter of the American Association of Architects. They began to hold regular meetings to discuss the prospects of such a world's fair. Architects involved included Gertrude Kerbis, Helmut Jahn and Bertrand Goldberg. In 1980, Harry Weese met with business leaders including Thomas Ayers for a breakfast meeting at the Tribune Tower for the purpose of discussing means to "improve the image of Chicago". This ultimately led to the establishment of a tentative steering committee, led by Ayers. An official 1992 Worlds Fair Steering Committee would be established on February 11, 1981.

== Bid process ==
=== Becoming the United States candidate city ===
In October 1980, United States Secretary of Commerce Philip Klutznick notified the BIE that they intended to submit an application. The Chicago 1992 Worlds Fair Steering Committee also contacted the BIE to inform them that they intended to apply for a fair. Chicago Mayor Jane Byrne directly communicated her support for the fair to BIE president Patrick Reid. In January 1981, the planning committee officially incorporated as the Chicago World's Fair - 1992 Corporation. That June, the Illinois General Assembly proclaimed its "support for the goals of the Chicago World’s Fair 1992 Corporation and the establishment of a 1992 World’s Fair in Chicago." The next month, the Chicago City Council formally endorsed the fair, and in August, Illinois Governor James R. Thompson officially supported the fair. By November, United States President Ronald Reagan endorsed the planned fair and offered support and assistance.

By 1982, Jane Byrne's mayoral administration had included plans for a 1992 world's fair in Chicago's comprehensive plan. Byrne strongly supported the fair effort. The fair corporation garnered donations from corporations, including as Commonwealth Edison, Continental Bank, FCB, Marshall Field's, National Can Corporation, and Illinois Bell. Chicago was selected as the United States candidate city through a competitive selection hosted by the United States Department of Commerce, defeating the cities of Columbus, New York, Miami, Houston, Oklahoma City, and Sacramento.

=== Bureau of International Expositions bidding ===
Chicago was seen to be competing with Paris for the right to host a "universal exposition". Paris was seeking an exhibition in 1989 to commemorate the bicentennial of the French Revolution. On June 24, 1982, the Bureau of International Expositions provisionally approved both Paris' and Chicago's proposed exhibitions, waiving the rule that mandated that "universal expositions" be held at least ten years apart, while also provisionally approving for Seville to host a "general exhibition" in 1992.

=== Bid proposal ===
Chicago proposed hosting a fair in 1992 to commemorate the 500th anniversary of Christopher Columbus' arrival in the "New World". Several teams of architects presented proposals for the fair grounds. One team was led by Stuart Cohen (a member of the "Chicago Seven") and Anders Nereim. Ultimately, a Skidmore, Owings & Merrill proposal, involving extensive use of lakefill, was selected.

Chicago's proposal was to use 23 blocks of the city's lakefront, covering 475-acres of the Near South Side lakefront (295 acres of existing land, 180 acres of lakefill, 100 acres of lagoon and harbor areas), in addition to a 150-acre parking lot to accommodate 19,000 cars plus a secondary lot for 10,000 more cars. Outside of the proposed parking lots, all the land was owned by either the Chicago Park District or the State of Illinois. The land used would include Grant Park, and would massively expand the lakefront parkland on the Near South Side. The plan also entailed the closure of Meigs Field. New artificial islands would dot the lakefront between Balbo Drive and 31st Street. The new parkland would partially fulfill the vision Daniel Burnham had outlined in the Plan of Chicago. Proposed infrastructure improvements included widening Lake Shore Drive and the Dan Ryan Expressway, upgrading roads in the neighborhoods of Pilsen and Chinatown. The fair anticipated 65 million visitors, and was estimated to cost between $400 million and $600 million to stage.

== Preparations ==
Architects such as Harry Weese collaborated with the World's Fair Authority throughout the design process. There was a Women's Committee for the 1992 Chicago World's Fair, which sought to bring about greater female representation at the fair, including a Women's Building, similar to the one at the 1893 Chicago World's Columbian Exposition.

The election of a new Chicago mayor, Harold Washington, in 1983, as well as the coinciding election of new members to the Chicago City Council, saw greater hostility towards the fair in the city's government. Washington was wary of the fair, refusing to have the city bear the burden of cost overruns. Members of the Chicago City Council regularly expressed dissatisfaction with the proposed location of the fair, with several alderman pushing to move the fair to their own wards.

On June 27, 1984, United States President Ronald Reagan issued a presidential proclamation inviting US states to participate in the exposition and both authorizing and directing the United States Secretary of State to, on his behalf, invite foreign countries to participate in the exposition. However, from the start, Reagan only had promised limited, and contingent, federal support. The fair preparations ultimately became hampered by a lack of federal resources and support.

There were continued arguments in Chicago about the site of the fair, with many alternate sites being proposed. In 1984, architect Bertrand Goldberg proposed alternate plans for the fair grounds, instead focusing on inland development along the Chicago River, creating a "floating World's Fair" located in three new basins within the river, and also locating other parts of the fair "floating" in Monroe Harbor. The most thoroughly-planned and supported alternative site proposal was a 450-acre site on Lake Calumet on the far south side.

=== Financing ===
When the city first bid, it estimated the fair to cost between $400 million and $600 million. Costs estimates for the fair rose. By 1984, it was estimated to cost $800 million. By 1985, the price sat at $1.1 billion. The fair struggled to amass solidified financial pledges from private industry or from state and local governments. It was estimated that the fair would require over 50 million visitors to remain solvent. For instance, in 1984 when the price tag sat at $800 million, it was estimated that the fair would need to attract 54.5 million visitors and generate $892 million to remain solvent. While the fair officials were projecting the fair would turn a profit, several outside studies were projecting massive deficits.

In 1984, the fair had failed in a quest to receive a $450 million loan from the state of Illinois. In the end, the fair planners had been proposing that the fair would be funded, in part, with $511 million from the private sector, including $290 million in bonds. The State of Illinois was being requested to directly provide $278 million in funding, and sell an additional $220 million in guarantee bonds. The United States Federal Government was anticipated to provide $80 million in funds. Chicago was to provide $28 million in funds to develop Navy Pier. The city was also expected to provide 14 years of property tax abatements on the land for the fair, giving up $33 million in annual tax revenues.

State legislatures took issue with the plans that specified that the private investors would have priority over the state in recouping their investment. The state also desired for the state to contribute less, and the city to contribute more. Federal financial contribution was not guaranteed. The Chicago city government ultimately refused to make a financial investment in the fair.

== Cancellation ==
The 1984 Louisiana World Exposition financially failed and declared bankruptcy, imperiling the embattled Chicago fair effort. In June 1985, the Illinois state legislature refused to appropriate funds to finance the fair, criticizing the planned fair as, "misguided, risky, and fatally flawed". That month, a legislative advisory panel issued a report declaring that, "proceeding with the fair as planned would be a misguided economic decision." The fair lost the support of Governor James R. Thompson, Illinois House Speaker Michael Madigan, and the support of the Chicago World's Fair 1992 Authority itself. The fair also did not have support from Chicago mayor Harold Washington. By then, $12 million in both public and private funding had already been spent on the fair effort. In December 1987, the BIE formally withdrew its sanction for a 1992 Chicago universal exposition, officially preventing its revival.
