= Convention Relating to International Exhibitions =

International treaty signed on November 22, 1928 in Paris, France

The Convention Relating to International Exhibitions is an international treaty signed on November 22, 1928 in Paris, France. It primarily governs the quality and frequency of international exhibitions and established the Bureau International des Expositions (BIE).

== Background ==
From the time of the Great Exhibition in London in 1851, and for over 70 years, countries competed to host international exhibitions, striving to attract participation from other nations. This led to challenges for all involved due to the high frequency of events, the significant financial investments required, and uncertainty regarding the regulation and success of each event.

The frequency of international exhibitions became excessive. National authorities struggled to manage organizational details, and the regulations, which varied from country to country, were inadequate. This situation underscored the need for a legal framework to establish clear criteria, particularly concerning the frequency and quality of international exhibitions.

Before the Convention, there were attempts to create regulatory mechanisms. For example, the French Committee of Exhibitions was established in 1902. By 1908, similar organizations had emerged in Germany, Austria, Belgium, Denmark, Hungary, Italy, Japan, the Netherlands, and Switzerland. However, because these were national entities, their interactions led to disputes. To resolve these, a Federation of Permanent Committees was created, with its first meeting held in Paris in 1907. At its second meeting, in Brussels in 1908, the Federation formulated doctrines on international exhibitions and scheduled a third meeting for May 1910 in Berlin, Germany. This third meeting, delayed until October 1912, laid the groundwork for an international convention based on French and German proposals. However, the First World War prevented the signing of this agreement and indefinitely suspended the discussions.

== Drafting and entry into force ==
In 1925, the French Committee of Exhibitions reconvened other committees. However, only those from Belgium and Switzerland had survived the war. In January 1928, the government of France invited countries with which it had diplomatic relations to resume work on a convention relating to international exhibitions. Representatives from 40 countries participated in the conference, with four other countries and the International Chamber of Commerce attending as observers.

On November 22, 1928, in Paris, 29 countries signed the Convention Relating to International Exhibitions. The government of France has acted as the depositary of the Convention and its instruments of accession. Under Article 33, the Convention was to come into effect after seven of the signatory countries had ratified the treaty. On December 17, 1930, the French Ministry of Foreign Affairs recorded that it had received the deposit of ratifications by nine countries: Albania, France, Germany, Romania, Spain, Sweden, Switzerland, Tunisia, and the United Kingdom. On January 17, 1931, the Convention came into force, becoming the legal instrument that continues to regulate international exhibitions.

As of November 27, 2024, 184 countries had adhered to the Convention Relating to International Exhibitions. For the full list of signatories to the Convention and the dates on which they acceded, see Bureau International des Expositions § Member states.

== Protocols and amendments ==
Over time, the Convention Relating to International Exhibitions has been amended and supplemented with additional instruments addressing exhibition categories, duration, and frequency:

- Protocol of May 10, 1948
- Protocol of November 16, 1966
- Protocol/Amendment of November 30, 1972
- Amendment of June 24, 1982
- Amendment of May 31, 1988

== Sections ==
The sections of the current version of the Convention Relating to International Exhibitions, following the Amendment of May 31, 1988 are:

=== Part I - Definitions and Objectives ===
Article 1: Defines what constitutes an exhibition, including its purpose and scope.

Article 2: Specifies the applicability of the Convention, listing the types of exhibitions covered and exemptions.

=== Part II - General Conditions Governing the Organization of International Exhibitions ===
Article 3: Outlines the features required for international exhibitions to be eligible for registration by the Bureau International des Expositions.

Article 4: Describes the conditions for exhibitions to receive recognition, including specific themes and limitations on size and duration.

Article 5: Establishes the rules regarding the opening and closing dates of exhibitions and the need for Bureau approval for any changes.

=== Part III - Registration ===
Article 6: Details the application process for registration or recognition, including requirements for governments and organizers.

Article 7: Provides guidelines for resolving competing claims between countries that wish to host exhibitions.

Article 8: States the consequences for changing the date of a registered or recognized exhibition.

Article 9: Lists the conditions under which contracting parties may refuse participation or government subsidies.

=== Part IV - Obligations of Organizers of Registered Exhibitions and of Participating States ===
Article 10: Requires the inviting government to ensure compliance with the Convention and related regulations.

Article 11: Sets forth the process for issuing invitations to participate in an exhibition.

Article 12: Mandates the appointment of a Commissioner-General or Commissioner of the Exhibition by the inviting government.

Article 13: Requires participating governments to appoint a Section Commissioner-General or Section Commissioner.

Articles 17-20: Define the rights of participants, rules on national sections, the use of geographical titles, and conditions for monopoly services within exhibitions.

=== Part V - Institutional Arrangements ===
Article 25: Establishes the Bureau International des Expositions to supervise and ensure the application of the Convention.

Article 26: Describes the composition of the General Assembly of the Bureau.

Article 27: Outlines the functions of the General Assembly, including adopting regulations and managing the Bureau's operations.

Article 28: Defines voting rights and decision-making procedures in the General Assembly.

Article 29: Specifies the election and role of the President of the Bureau.

Articles 30-31: Detail the composition and responsibilities of the Executive Committee and the role of the Secretary-General.

Article 32: Describes the Bureau's budget, revenue sources, and expenses.

Articles 33-35: Cover the process for proposing amendments to the Convention, dispute resolution, and conditions for accession by other states.
