= Haibao =

Mascot of Expo 2010

Haibao

Haibao (simplified Chinese: 海宝; traditional Chinese: 海寶), meaning "jewel of the sea", is the mascot of Expo 2010, which was held in the city of Shanghai, China from May 1 to October 31, 2010.

== Meaning ==
The character 人 in seal script

"Hai (海)" means the sea in Chinese language inscribed from the name of the host city, and "Bao (宝,寶)" means the treasure. Its figure is in the shape of the Chinese character "Ren (人)" (meaning human). Haibao was produced by Taiwanese designer Wu Yong-jian and adopted as the official mascot of the World Expo on December 18, 2007. He was selected out of 26,655 entries as part of an international competition.

== Similarities to Gumby ==
It is sometimes pointed out that Haibao resembles Gumby, the green clay humanoid figure shown on American television from the 1950s–'60s. The expo's secretariat said that it is an original design and they had never heard of Gumby.

== See also ==
- Seymore D. Fair, mascot for the New Orleans 1984 expo
- Twipsy, mascot for the 2000 Hannover expo
