= Twipsy =

- Created by: Javier Mariscal
- Opening theme: "Twipsy" (Note: Also titled as "Cyberspace") by Cece Giannotti
- Countries of origin: Germany; Spain
- Original language: English
- No. of episodes: 26 (52 segments)

Production
- Running time: 22 minutes
- Production companies: Junior Produktions GmbH; HaffaDiebold; Estudio Mariscal

Original release
- Network: Der Kinderkanal (Germany)
- Release: 1 November 1999 – 24 April 2000

Twipsy was the official Mascot of the Expo 2000 world's fair held in Hannover. The character was created by the Spanish designer Javier Mariscal. His draft was selected in 1995 by an international jury out of 17 proposals in total. During the course of the Expo, Twipsy could be acquired on the EXPO area on forms of merchandise, ranging from a stuffed plush toy, to apparel such as on T-shirts, mugs, watches and other souvenirs, in addition to those with the EXPO logo. Apart from that, stamps showing Twipsy were released, and full-sized versions of Twipsy were running around on the EXPO area and advertising for the EXPO in other countries.

== Appearance ==
Twipsy has a drop-shaped, colourfully striped body and a demilune yellow head with a large turquoise-colored nose. The area around the eyes, the extension at the back of the head and the chin are black. He's wearing a pointed, high-heeled shoe as well as a rounded flat one. He also has a "normal" thin and an oversized orange arm (which resembles a wing). The colour scheme may vary depending on the version.

=== Selection ===
During a design contest in 1995 to elect the ideal official mascot for the Expo 2000 in Hannover, Twipsy was chosen out of 17 proposals in total by an international jury, despite receiving only 1% of the public vote.

According to Mariscal, Twipsy is a burst of energy who came "...from a distant past such as is the Big Bang, a spark in expansion that became a star, a cell, an invertebrate, a reptile, a bird, a mammal..." and into his present form.

Additionally, Mariscal stated that it was his intention to "...embody the triangular aspects of the key theme "Humankind - Nature - Technology" in one figure... therefore [Twipsy] resembles a new type of being, a new human-animal-technological species." Additionally, Twipsy "...harmonise[d] with the corporate design of [the EXPO]", and was also "...adaptable in terms of shape and colour, and [therefore] a suitable playful and informative partner for the EXPO logo."

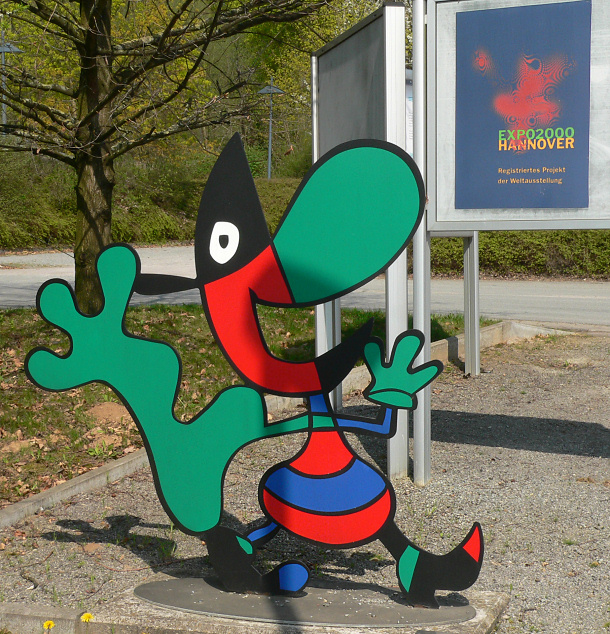
Twipsy at an EXPO project in Emmerthal

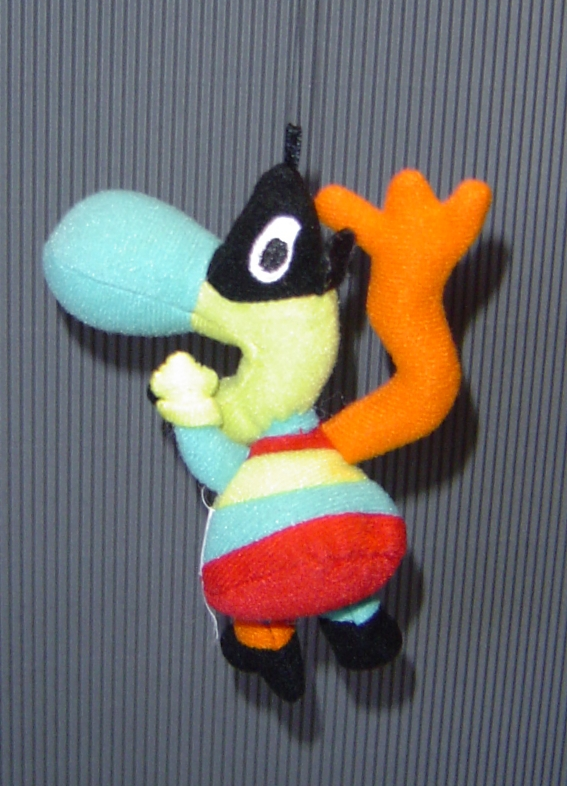
Twipsy as a Cuddly toy

== TV series ==
On 1 November 1999, the animated series Twipsy aired on the German TV channel Der Kinderkanal with 52 short episodes, 13 minutes each. They were often paired to make 26 episodes, having a total length of 25 minutes per pair. Seven months prior to the start of the EXPO 2000, the series premiere was used to get children accustomed to the upcoming World Exposition, however it focused only on character backstory, and had no connection to the Expo.

In the first episode, 13-year-old Nick is pulled by accident into Cyberspace. He then meets the colourful and feisty cybermessenger Twipsy, who introduces Nick to the virtual realm. Nick gets homesick and Twipsy sends him back to the real world, while inadvertently ending up there too.

A modified scanner is then used as a transporter into the universe of the internet. Along the way many other children, including Nick's 8-year-old sister Lissie and his friend Albert, experience many adventures and get to know the cyberspace realm. Twipsy also gets to know aspects of the real world, such as weather, or his newfound love (and gluttony) of food.

The characters are displayed using computer graphics when they're residing in Cyberspace, and in the "real world" using conventional comic style. Apart from that, all people are nearly the same size and appearance as Twipsy himself.

== Broadcast history ==
In Romania, Twipsy aired on TVR Cultural in 2003.

== See also ==
- Haibao, mascot for the 2010 Shanghai expo
- List of German television series
- Seymore D. Fair, mascot for the New Orleans 1984 expo
