= List of world's fairs =

This is a chronological list of international or colonial world's fairs.

== 1790s ==
- 1791 – Prague, Bohemia – first industrial exhibition on the occasion of the coronation of Leopold II as king of Bohemia, took place in Clementinum, a site of considerable sophistication of manufacturing methods. For this occasion, Wolfgang Amadeus Mozart wrote his final opera La clemenza di Tito.
- 1798 – Paris, France – L'Exposition des produits de l'industrie française, Paris, 1798. This was the first public industrial exposition in France although earlier in 1798 the Marquis d'Avèze had held a private exposition of handicrafts and manufactured goods at the Maison d'Orsay in the Rue de Varenne and it was this that suggested the idea of a public exposition to Nicolas François de Neufchâteau, Minister of the Interior for the French Republic.

== 1800s ==
- 1801 – Paris, France – Second Exposition (1801). After the success of the exposition of 1798 a series of expositions for French manufacturing followed (1801, 1802, 1806, 1819, 1823, 1827, 1834, 1844 and 1849) until the first properly international (or universal) exposition in France in 1855.
- 1802 – Paris, France – Third Exposition (1802)
- 1806 – Paris, France – Fourth Exposition (1806)

== 1810s ==
- 1819 – Paris, France – Fifth Exposition (1819)

== 1820s ==
- 1823 – Paris, France – Sixth Exposition (1823)
- 1827 – Paris, France – Seventh Exposition (1827)
- 1829 – New York City, United States – American Institute Fair
- 1829 – Turin, Piedmont-Sardinia – Prima Triennale Pubblica Esposizione dell’anno 1829. In Turin, a second 'triennale' followed in 1832 before other national agricultural, industrial, commercial, and applied arts expositions there in 1838, 1844, 1850 and 1858.

== 1830s ==
- 1832 – Turin, Piedmont-Sardinia – Seconda Triennale Pubblica Esposizione dell’anno 1832.
- 1834 – Paris, France – French Industrial Exposition of 1834
- 1838 – Turin, Piedmont-Sardinia – Pubblica esposizione dell'anno 1838.
- 1839 – Paris, France – Ninth Exposition (1839)

== 1840s ==
- 1844 – Paris, France – French Industrial (Tenth) Exposition of 1844
- 1844 – Turin, Piedmont-Sardinia – Quarta Esposizione d'Industria et di Belle Arti.
- 1846 – Genoa, Piedmont-Sardinia – Esposizione dei Prodotti e delle Manufatture nazionali
- 1849 – Birmingham, United Kingdom – Exhibition of Industrial Arts and Manufacturers
- 1849 – London, United Kingdom – First Exhibition of British Manufacturers (1849)
- 1849 – Paris, France – Eleventh Exposition (1849)

== 1850s ==
- 1850 – Turin, Piedmont-Sardinia – Quinta Esposizione di Industria e di Belle Arti
- 1851 – London, United Kingdom – The Great Exhibition of the Works of Industry of All Nations – The Crystal Palace (typically listed as the "first world's fair")
- 1852 – Cork, Ireland – Irish Industrial Exhibition
- 1853 – Naples, Two Sicilies – Solenne Pubblica Esposizione di Arti e Manifatture
- 1853–1854 – New York City, United States – Exhibition of the Industry of All Nations
- 1853 – Dublin, Ireland – Great Industrial Exhibition (1853)
- 1854 – Genoa, Piedmont-Sardinia – Esposizione Industriale
- 1854 – Munich, Bavaria – General German Industrial Exhibition (Allgemeine deutsche Industrie-Ausstellung)
- 1854 – Melbourne, Victoria – Melbourne Exhibition (in conjunction with Exposition Universelle (1855))
- 1855 – Paris, France – Exposition Universelle (1855)
- 1856 – Brussels, Belgium – International Exhibition
- 1857 – Manchester, United Kingdom – Art Treasures Exhibition at the Royal Botanical Gardens, Stretford
- 1857 – Lausanne, Switzerland – Lausanne Exhibition
- 1858 – Dijon, France – Dijon Exposition
- 1858 – Philadelphia, Pennsylvania, United States – Philadelphia Technological Exhibition
- 1858 – Turin, Piedmont-Sardinia – Sesta Esposizione Nazionale di Prodotti d'Industria

== 1860s ==
- 1860 – Montreal, Quebec, Canada - Grand Exhibition of the Industrial Products of United Canada at the Crystal Palace (Montreal)
- 1861 – Brisbane, Queensland – First Queensland Exhibition
- 1861 – Melbourne, Victoria – Second Victorian Exhibition
- 1861 – Metz, France – Exposition Universelle (1861)
- 1861 – Amsterdam, Netherlands – Fisheries Exposition
- 1862 – Geelong, Victoria, Australia - Exhibition of Art, Science and Industry
- 1862 – London, United Kingdom – 1862 International Exhibition
- 1864 – Bayonne, France – Franco-Spanish Exposition
- 1865 – Cologne, Prussia – International Agricultural Exhibition
- 1865 – Bergen, Norway – International Fisheries Exhibition
- 1865 – Batavia, Dutch East Indies – Industrial and Agricultural Exhibition
- 1865 – Dunedin, New Zealand – New Zealand Exhibition
- 1865 – Dublin, United Kingdom – International Exhibition of Arts and Manufactures
- 1865 – Freetown, Sierra Leone – Sierra Leone Exhibition
- 1865 – Porto, Portugal – 1865 International Exhibition
- 1866 – Ballarat, Victoria – National Industrial Exhibition
- 1866 – Melbourne, Victoria – Intercolonial Exhibition of Australasia
- 1866 – Boulogne-sur-Mer, France – International Fisheries Exposition
- 1866 – Arcachon, France – International Exposition of Fish and Water Products
- 1866 – Stockholm, Sweden – Scandinavian Industrial Exhibition
- 1867 – Paris, France – Exposition Universelle (1867)
- 1867 – The Hague, Netherlands – International Maritime Exhibition
- 1867 – Aarhaus, Denmark – International Maritime Exhibition
- 1867 – Vienna, Austria – International Maritime Exhibition
- 1867 – Gothenburg, Sweden – International Maritime Exhibition
- 1868 – Le Havre, France – International Maritime Exposition
- 1869 – Amsterdam, Netherlands – International Exhibition of Domestic Economy

== 1870s ==
- 1870 – Sydney, New South Wales – Intercolonial Exhibition (1870)
- 1871 – Córdoba, Argentina – Exposición Nacional
- 1871 – London, United Kingdom – First Annual International Exhibition (1871)
- 1871 – Naples, Italy – International Maritime Exposition
- 1872 – Hamilton, Bermuda – Industrial and Loan Exhibition
- 1872 – Copenhagen, Denmark – Second Scandinavian Exhibition of Arts and Industry
- 1872 – London, United Kingdom – Second Annual International Exhibition (1872)
- 1872 – Christchurch, New Zealand – New Zealand Interprovincial Exhibition
- 1872 – Lima, Peru – Lima International Exhibition
- 1872 – Lyon, France – Exposition Universelle et Internationale (1872)
- 1872 – Kyoto, Japan – Exhibition of Arts and Manufactures (1872)
- 1873 – London, United Kingdom – Third Annual International Exhibition (1873)
- 1873 – Vienna, Austria – Weltausstellung 1873 Wien
- 1873 – Sydney, New South Wales – Metropolitan Intercolonial Exhibition (1873)
- 1874 – London, United Kingdom – Fourth Annual International Exhibition (1874)
- 1874 – Dublin, United Kingdom – International Exhibition of Arts and Manufactures (1874)
- 1874 – Rome, Italy – Esposizione internazionale (1874) (never held)
- 1874 – Jamestown, Saint Helena – St. Helena Industrial Exhibition
- 1874 – Marseille, France – Exhibition of Modern Inventions and Discoveries
- 1874 – Philadelphia, Pennsylvania, United States – Franklin Institute Exhibition
- 1875 – Melbourne, Victoria – Victorian Intercolonial Exhibition
- 1875 – Nizhny Novgorod, Russia – Nizhny Novgorod Fair (1875)
- 1875 – Sydney, New South Wales – Intercolonial Exhibition (1875)
- 1875 – Santiago, Chile – Chilean International Exhibition
- 1876 – Brussels, Belgium – International Exposition of Hygiene and Life-saving Apparatus
- 1876 – Helsinki, Finland – Finnish General Exhibition
- 1876 – Adelaide, South Australia – Adelaide Industrial Exhibition
- 1876 – Philadelphia, Pennsylvania, United States – Centennial Exposition
- 1876 – Brisbane, Queensland – Intercolonial Exhibition (1876)
- 1876 – London, United Kingdom – London Loan Collection of Scientific Apparatus
- 1877 – Cape Town, Cape Colony – South African International Exhibition
- 1877 – Tokyo, Japan – First National Industrial Exhibition (1877) (Ueno Park)
- 1877 – Sydney, New South Wales – Sydney Metropolitan and Intercolonial Exhibition
- 1877 – Adelaide, South Australia – Adelaide Industrial Exhibition
- 1878 – Paris, France – Exposition Universelle (1878)
- 1878 – Ballarat, Victoria – Australian Juvenile Industrial Exhibition (1878)
- 1878 – London, United Kingdom – International Fisheries Exhibition
- 1879 - Berlin Trade Exhibition
- 1879 – Bendigo, Victoria – Juvenile Industrial Exhibition
- 1879 – Geelong, Victoria – Geelong Juvenile and Industrial Exhibition
- 1879 – Sydney, New South Wales – Intercolonial Juvenile Industrial Exhibition
- 1879 – Sydney, New South Wales – Sydney International Exhibition
- 1879 – Melbourne, Victoria – Intercolonial Juvenile Industrial Exhibition (1879)
- 1879 – Kilburn, United Kingdom – International Agricultural Exhibition

== 1880s ==
- 1880 – Berlin, Germany – International Fisheries Exhibition
- 1880 – Christchurch, New Zealand – Christchurch Industrial Exhibition
- 1880 – Adelaide, South Australia – Industrial and Juvenile Exhibition
- 1880 – Glasgow, United Kingdom – Glasgow Electrical Exhibition
- 1880-1881 – Melbourne, Victoria – Melbourne International Exhibition
- 1881 – Adelaide, South Australia – Adelaide Exhibition.
- 1881 – Matanzas, Cuba – Exhibition of Matanzas
- 1881 – Paris, France – International Exposition of Electricity, Paris
- 1881 – Dunedin, New Zealand – Dunedin Industrial Exhibition
- 1881 – Atlanta, Georgia, United States – International Cotton Exposition
- 1881 – Budapest, Austria-Hungary – Országos Nőipari Kiállitás
- 1881 – London, United Kingdom – International Medical and Sanitary Exhibition
- 1881 – Tokyo, Japan – Second National Industrial Exhibition
- 1881-1882 – Perth, Western Australia – Perth International Exhibition
- 1882 – Lille, France – International Exposition of Industrial Art
- 1882 – Munich, Germany – International Electrical Exposition
- 1882 – Christchurch, New Zealand – New Zealand International Exhibition
- 1882 – London, United Kingdom – Crystal Palace Electric Exhibition
- 1882 – Edinburgh, United Kingdom – International Fisheries Exhibition
- 1882 – Bordeaux, France – Exposition internationale des vins
- 1882 – Buenos Aires, Argentina – South American Continental Exhibition (Exposición Continental Sud-Americana)
- 1883 – London, United Kingdom – International Electric Exhibition
- 1883 – Vienna, Austria-Hungary – International Electrical Exposition
- 1883 – Cork, United Kingdom – Cork Industrial Exhibition
- 1883 – Amsterdam, Netherlands – International Colonial and Export Exhibition
- 1883 – Calcutta, India – Calcutta International Exhibition
- 1883 – Marseille, France – International Maritime Exposition
- 1883 – Christchurch, New Zealand – All Colonial Exhibition
- 1883 – Madrid, Spain – Exposition of Mining and Metallurgy
- 1883 – South Kensington, United Kingdom – International Fisheries Exhibition
- 1883 – Parramatta, New South Wales – Intercolonial Juvenile Industrial Exhibition
- 1883 – Hobart, Tasmania – Tasmanian Juvenile and Industrial Exhibition
- 1883 – Launceston, Tasmania – Art and Industrial Exhibition
- 1883 – Louisville, Kentucky, United States – Southern Exposition
- 1883 – New York City, United States – World's Fair (1883) (never held)
- 1883 – Caracas, Venezuela – National Exposition of Venezuela
- 1883–1884 – Boston, Massachusetts, United States – The American Exhibition of the Products, Arts and Manufactures of Foreign Nations
- 1884 – Nice, France – International Exposition of Nice
- 1884 – Amsterdam, Netherlands – International Agricultural Exhibition
- 1884 – London, United Kingdom – London International Universal Exhibition
- 1884 – South Kensington, United Kingdom – International Health and Education Exhibition
- 1884 – Cape Town, Cape Colony – South African Industrial Exhibition
- 1884 – Durban, South Africa – Natal Agricultural, Horticultural, Industrial and Art Exhibition
- 1884 – New Orleans, Louisiana, United States – World Cotton Centennial
- 1884 – Melbourne, Victoria – Victorian International Exhibition 1884 of Wine, Fruit, Grain & other products of the soil of Australasia with machinery, plant and tools employed
- 1884 – Edinburgh, United Kingdom – First International Forestry Exhibition
- 1884 – Turin, Italy – Esposizione Generale Italiana
- 1884 – Adelaide, South Australia – Grand Industrial Exhibition
- 1885 – Melbourne, Victoria – Victorians' Jubilee Exhibition (1885) (Jubilee of Victoria Exhibition)
- 1885 – Port Elizabeth, Cape Colony (now South Africa) – South African Exhibition
- 1885 – Antwerp, Belgium – Exposition Universelle d'Anvers (1885)
- 1885 – Nuremberg, Germany – International Exposition of Metals and Metallurgy
- 1885 – Budapest, Hungary – Hungarian National Exhibition
- 1885 – Wellington, New Zealand – New Zealand Industrial Exhibition
- 1885 – Zaragoza, Spain – Aragonese Exposition
- 1885 – London, United Kingdom – International Inventions Exhibition
- 1886 – London, United Kingdom – Colonial and Indian Exhibition (1886)
- 1886 – Edinburgh, United Kingdom – International Exhibition of Industry, Science and Art
- 1886 – Liverpool, United Kingdom – International Exhibition of Navigation, Commerce and Industry (1886)
- 1886 – Bendigo, Victoria – Juvenile and Industrial Exhibition
- 1886 – Launceston, Tasmania – Launceston Industrial Exhibition
- 1886 – Perth, Western Australia – West Australian Exhibition
- 1887 – Le Havre, France – International Maritime Exposition
- 1887 – Atlanta, United States – Piedmont Exposition
- 1887 – Geelong, Victoria – Geelong Jubilee Juvenile and Industrial Exhibition (1887)
- 1887 – Manchester, United Kingdom – Royal Jubilee Exhibition
- 1887 – London, United Kingdom – American Exhibition
- 1887 – Newcastle, United Kingdom – Royal Mining Engineering Jubilee Exhibition
- 1887 – Rome, Italy – Esposizione mondiale (1887)
- 1887 – Madrid, Spain – Exposición General de las Islas Filipinas
- 1887–1888 – Adelaide, South Australia – Adelaide Jubilee International Exhibition (1887)
- 1888 – Glasgow, United Kingdom – International Exhibition (1888)
- 1888 – Brussels, Belgium – Grand Concours International des Sciences et de l'Industrie (1888)
- 1888 – Barcelona, Spain – Exposición Universal de Barcelona (1888)
- 1888 – Cincinnati, Ohio – Cincinnati Centennial Exposition (1888)
- 1888 – Lisbon, Portugal – Exposição Industrial Portugueza (1888)
- 1888 – Copenhagen, Denmark – The Nordic Exhibition of 1888 (Nordiske Industri-Landbrugs og Kunstudstilling)
- 1888–1889 – Melbourne, Victoria – Melbourne Centennial Exhibition
- 1888–1889 – Melbourne, Victoria – Victorian Juvenile Industrial Exhibition (1888)
- 1889 – Paris, France – Exposition Universelle (1889) – Eiffel Tower
- 1889 – Dunedin, New Zealand – New Zealand and South Seas Exhibition (1889)
- 1889 – Buffalo, New York, United States – International Industrial Fair (1889)

== 1890s ==
- 1890 – Buenos Aires, Argentina – Agricultural Exhibition
- 1890 – Vienna, Austria-Hungary – Agricultural and Forestry Exposition
- 1890 – Bremen, Germany – Nord-West-Deutsche Gewerbe und Industrie-Ausstellung
- 1890 – London, United Kingdom – International Exhibition of Mining and Metallurgy
- 1890 – Edinburgh, United Kingdom – International Exhibition of Science, Art & Industry
- 1890 – Ballarat, Victoria - Australian Juvenile Industrial Exhibition
- 1891 – Moscow, Russia – Exposition française de Moscow
- 1891 – Frankfurt, Germany – International Electrotechnical Exhibition
- 1891 – Kingston, Jamaica – International Exhibition (1891)
- 1891 – Prague, Austria-Hungary – General Land Centennial Exhibition (1891) at the Prague Exhibition Grounds
- 1891 – Adelaide, South Australia – Industrial Exhibition of South Australian Industries, Products and Manufactures
- 1891 – Port of Spain – Trinidad and Tobago Exhibition
- 1891–1892 – Launceston, Tasmania – Tasmanian International Exhibition (1891)
- 1892 – Grenoble, France – International Alpine Exposition of Grenoble
- 1892 – Genoa, Italy – Esposizione Italo-Americana (1892)
- 1892 – Washington, D.C., United States – Exposition of the Three Americas (1892) (never held)
- 1892 – London, United Kingdom – Crystal Palace Electrical Exhibition
- 1892 – Kimberley, Cape of Good Hope – South African and International Exhibition
- 1892–1893 – Madrid, Spain – Historical American Exposition
- 1893 – Chicago, Illinois, United States – World's Columbian Exposition – Palace of Fine Arts and the World's Congress Auxiliary Building
- 1893 – New York City, United States – World's Fair Prize Winners' Exposition (1893)
- 1894 – San Francisco, California, United States – California Midwinter International Exposition of 1894
- 1894 – Antwerp, Belgium – Exposition Internationale d'Anvers (1894)
- 1894 – Santiago, Chile – International Mining and Metallurgical Exposition
- 1894 – Lyon, France – Exposition internationale et coloniale
- 1894 – Manchester, United Kingdom – British and Colonial Exhibition
- 1894 – Porto, Portugal – Exposição Insular e Colonial Portugueza (1894)
- 1894 – Fremantle, Western Australia – Fremantle Industrial Exhibition
- 1895 – Adelaide, South Australia – Exhibition of Art and Industry
- 1895 - Charleroi, Belgium - Exposition internationale, industrielle, commerciale, agricole et horticole, avec annexes scientifiques et artistiques et concours ouvriers
- 1895 – Hobart, Tasmania – Tasmanian International Exhibition (1895)
- 1895 – Ballarat, Victoria – Australian Industrial Exhibition (1895)
- 1895 – Bordeaux, France – Bordeaux Exposition
- 1895 – Kyoto, Japan – National Japanese Exhibition
- 1895 – Christchurch, New Zealand – Art and Industrial Exhibition
- 1895 – Atlanta, Georgia, United States – Cotton States and International Exposition (1895) (Atlanta Exposition)
- 1895 – Montevideo, Uruguay - National Agricultural Exhibition
- 1896 – Rouen, France – National and Colonial Exposition
- 1896 – Kiel, Germany – International Shipping and Fishery Exposition
- 1896 – Budapest, Austria-Hungary – Hungarian Millenary Exhibition
- 1896 – Wellington, New Zealand – Wellington Industrial Exhibition
- 1896 – Nizhny Novgorod, Russia – Pan Russian Exhibition
- 1896 – Malmö, Sweden – Nordic Industrial and Handicraft Exhibition
- 1896 – Berlin, Germany – Great Industrial Exposition of Berlin
- 1896 – Mexico City, Mexico – International Exposition (1896) (never held)
- 1896 – Cardiff, United Kingdom – Cardiff Fine Arts, Industrial, and Maritime Exhibition
- 1896 – Geneva, Switzerland – Exposition National Suisse
- 1897 – Brussels, Belgium – Exposition Internationale de Bruxelles (1897)
- 1897 – Arcachon, France – Arcachon International Exposition
- 1897 – Guatemala City, Guatemala – Exposición Centroamericana
- 1897 – London, United Kingdom – Imperial Victorian Exhibition
- 1897 – Brisbane, Queensland – Queensland International Exhibition
- 1897 – Chicago, Illinois, United States – Irish Fair (1897)
- 1897 – Nashville, Tennessee, United States – Tennessee Centennial and International Exposition
- 1897 – Stockholm, Sweden – General Art and Industrial Exposition of Stockholm
- 1897 – Kiev, Russian Empire – Agricultural Exhibition
- 1898 – Buenos Aires, Argentina – National Exhibition
- 1898 – Jerusalem, Ottoman Empire – Universal Scientific and Philanthropic Exposition (1898)
- 1898 – Auckland, New Zealand – Auckland Industrial and Mining Exhibition
- 1898 – Dunedin, New Zealand – Otago Jubilee Industrial Exhibition (1898)
- 1898 – Omaha, Nebraska, United States – Trans-Mississippi Exposition
- 1898 – Bergen, Norway – International Fisheries Exposition (1898)
- 1898 – Munich, Germany – Kraft – und Arbeitsmaschinen-Ausstellung (1898)
- 1898 – San Francisco, California, United States – California's Golden Jubilee (1898)
- 1898 – Turin, Italy – Esposizione Generale Italiana
- 1898 – Vienna, Austria-Hungary – Jubiläums-Ausstellung
- 1898 – Launceston, Tasmania – Tasmanian Juvenile Industrial Exhibition
- 1898 – Grahamstown, South Africa – Industrial and Arts Exhibition
- 1899 – Coolgardie, Western Australia – Western Australian International Mining and Industrial Exhibition
- 1899 – Como, Italy – Como Electrical Exhibition
- 1899 – Omaha, Nebraska, United States – Greater America Exposition
- 1899 – Philadelphia, Pennsylvania, United States – National Export Exposition
- 1899 – London, United Kingdom – Greater Britain Exhibition

== 1900s ==
- 1900 – Paris, France – Exposition Universelle (1900) – Le Grand Palais
- 1900 – Adelaide, South Australia – Century Exhibition of Arts and Industries (1900)
- 1900 – Christchurch, New Zealand – Canterbury Jubilee Industrial Exhibition
- 1901 – Bendigo, Australia – Victorian Gold Jubilee Exhibition
- 1901 – Buffalo, New York, United States – Pan-American Exposition
- 1901 – Glasgow, United Kingdom – Glasgow International Exhibition (1901)
- 1901 – Vienna, Austria-Hungary – Bosnische Weihnachts-Ausstellung (1901)
- 1901 – Charleston, South Carolina, United States – South Carolina Inter-State and West Indian Exposition
- 1902 – Vienna, Austria-Hungary – International Fishery Exposition
- 1902 – Turin, Italy – Esposizione Internazionale d'Arte Decorativa Moderna
- 1902 – Hanoi, French Indochina – Hanoi exhibition (Indo China Exposition Française et Internationale)
- 1902 – Lille, France – International Exposition of Lille
- 1902 – Cork, United Kingdom – Cork International Exhibition
- 1902 – Wolverhampton, United Kingdom – Wolverhampton Art and Industrial Exhibition
- 1902 – St. Petersburg, Russia – International Fisheries Exhibition
- 1902 – New York City, United States – United States, Colonial and International Exposition (1902) (never held)
- 1902 – Toledo, Ohio, United States – Ohio Centennial and Northwest Territory Exposition (1902) – (never held)
- 1903 – Melbourne, Australia – Australian Federal International Exhibition
- 1903 – Osaka, Japan – Fifth National Industrial Exhibition
- 1904 – St. Louis, Missouri, United States – Louisiana Purchase Exposition (also called Louisiana Purchase International Exposition and Olympic Games ): 1904 Summer Olympics
- 1904 – Cape Town, South Africa – Cape Town Industrial Exhibition
- 1905 – Portland, Oregon, United States – Lewis and Clark Centennial Exposition
- 1905 – Liège, Belgium – Exposition universelle et internationale de Liège (1905)
- 1905 – London, United Kingdom – Naval, Shipping and Fisheries Exhibition
- 1905 – New York City, United States – Irish Industrial Exposition (1905)
- 1906 – Vienna, Austria-Hungary – Hygiene Exhibition
- 1906 – Milan, Italy – Esposizione Internazionale del Sempione
- 1906 – London, United Kingdom – Imperial Austrian Exhibition
- 1906 – Marseille, France – Exposition coloniale (1906)
- 1906 – Bucharest, Romania – Romanian General Exposition
- 1906 – Tourcoing, France – International Exposition of Textile Industries
- 1906–1907 – Christchurch, New Zealand – International Exhibition (1906)
- 1907 – Bordeaux, France – International Maritime Exposition
- 1907 – Tokyo, Japan – Tokyo Industrial Exhibition
- 1907 – Bergen, Norway – Nordic Marine Motor Exhibition
- 1907 – Dublin, United Kingdom – Irish International Exhibition
- 1907 – Hampton Roads, Virginia, United States – Jamestown Exposition
- 1907 – Chicago, Illinois, United States – World's Pure Food Exposition (1907)
- 1907 – Mannheim, Germany – Internationale Kunst-Ausstellung (1907)
- 1908 – Trondheim, Norway – Scandinavian Fisheries Exhibition
- 1908 – Zaragoza, Spain – Hispano-French Exposition of 1908
- 1908 – London, United Kingdom – Franco-British Exhibition (1908)
- 1908 – Edinburgh, United Kingdom – Scottish National Exhibition
- 1908 – New York City, United States – International Mining Exposition (1908)
- 1908 – Rio de Janeiro, Brazil – Exhibition of the Centenary of the Opening of the Ports of Brazil
- 1908 – Marseille, France – Exposition International de l'Electricite
- 1909 – London, United Kingdom – Imperial International Exhibition
- 1909 – Nancy, France – Exposition Internationale de l'Est de la France
- 1909 – Seattle, Washington, United States – Alaska-Yukon-Pacific Exposition
- 1909 – New York City, United States – Hudson-Fulton Celebration
- 1909 – San Francisco, California, United States – Portolá Festival (October 19–23, 1909)
- 1909 – Quito, Ecuador – National Ecuadorian Exposition

== 1910s ==
- 1910 – Vienna, Austria-Hungary – International Hunting Exposition
- 1910 – Santiago, Chile – International Agricultural and Industrial Exposition
- 1910 – Bogotá, Colombia – Exposición del Centenario de la independencia (1910)
- 1910 – Nanking, China – Nanyang Industrial Exposition
- 1910 – Brussels, Belgium – Brussels International 1910
- 1910 – Buenos Aires, Argentina – Exposición Internacional del Centenario
- 1910 – Nagoya, Japan – Nagoya Industrial Exhibition
- 1910 – London, United Kingdom – Japan–British Exhibition
- 1910 – San Francisco, California, United States – Admission Day Festival (1910) September 8, 9, 10
- 1910 – Vienna, Austria-Hungary – Internationale Jagd-Ausstellung (1910)
- 1911 – Charleroi, Belgium – Charleroi Exposition
- 1911 – Havana, Cuba – Cuban National Exposition
- 1911 – Roubaix, France – International Exposition of Northern France
- 1911 – Dresden, Germany – International Hygiene Exhibition
- 1911 – London, United Kingdom – Coronation Exhibition (1911)
- 1911 – London, United Kingdom – Festival of Empire
- 1911 – Rome, Italy – Esposizione internazionale d'arte (1911)
- 1911 – Wellington, New Zealand – Coronation Industrial Exhibition
- 1911 – Turin, Italy – Turin International
- 1911 – Omsk, Russia – Western Siberian Exhibition
- 1911 – Glasgow, United Kingdom – Scottish Exhibition of National History, Art and Industry
- 1911 – New York City, United States – International Mercantile Exposition (1911)
- 1912 – Manila, Philippines – Philippine Exposition (1912)
- 1912 – London, United Kingdom – Latin-British Exhibition
- 1912, 1917 – Tokyo, Japan – Grand Exhibition of Japan (planned for 1912, postponed to 1917 and then never held)
- 1913 – Melbourne, Australia - Great All-Australian Exhibition
- 1913 – Leipzig, Germany – International Building Trades Exposition
- 1913 – Auckland, New Zealand – Auckland Exhibition
- 1913 – Ghent, Belgium – Exposition universelle et internationale (1913)
- 1913 – Amsterdam, Netherlands – Tentoonstelling De Vrouw 1813–1913
- 1913 – Kiev, Russian Empire – All Russian Exhibition
- 1913 – Knoxville, Tennessee, United States – National Conservation Exposition
- 1914 – London, United Kingdom – Anglo-American Exhibition
- 1914 – Malmö, Sweden – Baltic Exhibition
- 1914 – Boulogne-sur-Mer, France – International Exposition of Sea Fishery Industries (1914)
- 1914 – Lyon, France – Exposition internationale urbaine de Lyon
- 1914 – Tokyo, Japan – Tokyo Taisho Exposition
- 1914 – Cologne, Germany – Werkbund Exhibition (1914)
- 1914 – Bristol, United Kingdom – International Exhibition (1914)
- 1914 – Nottingham, United Kingdom – Universal Exhibition (1914) (work begun on site 1913 but never held)
- 1914 – Semarang, Dutch East Indies – Colonial Exhibition of Semarang (Colonial Exposition)
- 1914 – Christiania, Norway – 1914 Jubilee Exhibition (Norges Jubilæumsutstilling)
- 1914 – Baltimore, United States – National Star-Spangled Banner Centennial Celebration
- 1914 – Genoa, Italy – International exhibition of marine and maritime hygiene
- 1915 – Casablanca, Morocco – Casablanca Fair of 1915
- 1915 – San Francisco, California, United States – Panama–Pacific International Exposition Palace of Fine Arts
- 1915 – Panama City, Panama – Exposición Nacional de Panama (1915)
- 1915 – Richmond, United States – Negro Historical and Industrial Exposition (1915)
- 1915 – Chicago, United States – Lincoln Jubilee and Exposition (1915)
- 1915–1916 – San Diego, California, United States – Panama–California Exposition
- 1916 – Wellington, New Zealand – British Commercial and Industrial Exhibition
- 1918 – New York City, United States – Bronx International Exposition of Science, Arts and Industries
- 1918 – Los Angeles, United States – California Liberty Fair (1918)

== 1920s ==
- 1920 – Adelaide, Australia – All-Australian Peace Exhibition
- 1920 – Shanghai, China – American-Chinese Exposition
- 1921 – Riga, Latvia – International Exhibition of Agriculture and Industry
- 1921 – Wellington, New Zealand – Exhibition of New Zealand Industries
- 1921 – London, United Kingdom – International Exhibition of Rubber and Other Tropical Products (1921)
- 1922 – Marseille, France – Exposition nationale coloniale (1922)
- 1922 – Tokyo, Japan – Peace Exhibition (1922)
- 1922 – Christchurch, New Zealand – Exhibition of New Zealand Industries
- 1922–1923 – Rio de Janeiro, Brazil – Exposição do Centenario do Brasil (1922)
- 1923 – Auckland, New Zealand – Dominion Industrial Exhibition
- 1923 – Los Angeles, United States – American Historical Review and Motion Picture Exposition (1923)
- 1923 – Calcutta, India – Calcutta Exhibition (1923) preparatory to British Empire Exhibition
- 1923 – Moscow, Soviet Union – All-Russian Agricultural and Domestic Industries Exhibition
- 1923 – Gothenburg, Sweden – Gothenburg Exhibition (1923) (Jubileumsutställningens i Göteborg) (Liseberg)
- 1923–1924 – Hokitika, New Zealand – British and Intercolonial Exhibition
- 1924 – Wembley, London, United Kingdom – British Empire Exhibition
- 1924 – New York City, United States – French Exposition (1924)
- 1924–1925 Buenos Aires, Argentina – Industrial Exposition
- 1925 – Adelaide, Australia – All-Australian Exhibition
- 1925 – Wellington, New Zealand – Dominion Industrial Exhibition
- 1925 – San Francisco, California, United States – California's Diamond Jubilee (1925)
- 1925 – Paris, France – International Exhibition of Modern Decorative and Industrial Arts
- 1925–1926 – Dunedin, New Zealand – New Zealand and South Seas International Exhibition
- 1926 – Philadelphia, Pennsylvania, United States – Sesquicentennial Exposition
- 1926 – Berlin, Germany – Internationale Polizeiausstellung (1926)
- 1927 – Lyon, France – Foire internationale (1925)
- 1927 – Stuttgart, Germany – Werkbund Exhibition
- 1928 – Cologne, Germany – International Press Exhibition
- 1928 – Long Beach, United States – Pacific Southwest Exposition (1928)
- 1929 – Newcastle upon Tyne, United Kingdom – North East Coast Exhibition
- 1929 – Hangzhou, China – Westlake Exposition
- 1929–1930 – Seville, Spain – Ibero-American Exposition of 1929
- 1929–1930 – Barcelona, Spain, – 1929 Barcelona International Exposition

== 1930s ==
- 1930 – Adelaide, Australia – All-Australian Exhibition
- 1930 – Antwerp, Belgium – Exposition internationale coloniale, maritime et d'art flamand
- 1930 – Liège, Belgium – Exposition internationale de la grande industrie, sciences et applications, art wallon ancien
- 1930 – Oran, Algeria – Oran Exposition
- 1930 – Dresden, Germany – International Hygiene Exposition
- 1930 – Stockholm, Sweden – Stockholm Exhibition (1930) (Utställningen av konstindustri, konsthandverk och hemslöjd)
- 1930 – Trondheim, Norway – Trøndelag Exhibition
- 1931 – Paris, France – Paris Colonial Exposition
- 1931 – Berlin, Germany – International Building Exposition
- 1932 – Tel Aviv, Mandatory Palestine – Levant Fair
- 1933 – Tokyo, Japan – Women's and Children International Exhibition
- 1933–1934 – Buenos Aires, Argentina – Industrial Exposition
- 1933–1934 – Chicago, Illinois, United States – Century of Progress International Exposition
- 1934 – Melbourne, Australia – Centenary All Australian Exhibition
- 1934 – Porto, Portugal – Portuguese colonial exhibition
- 1934 – Tel Aviv, Mandatory Palestine – Levant Fair
- 1935 – Yokohama, Japan – Grand Yokohama Exposition
- 1935 – Moscow, Soviet Union – All-Union Agricultural Exhibition (VSKhV)
- 1935 – Brussels, Belgium – Brussels International Exposition (1935)
- 1935 – Porto Alegre, Brazil – Farroupilha Revolution centennial fair
- 1935 – Taipei. Taiwan – The Taiwan Exposition: In Commemoration of the First Forty Years of Colonial Rule
- 1935–1936 – San Diego, California United States – California Pacific International Exposition
- 1936 – Adelaide, Australia – Adelaide Centennial Exhibition
- 1936 – Stockholm, Sweden ILIS 1936
- 1936 – Tel Aviv, Mandatory Palestine – Levant Fair
- 1936 – Cleveland, United States – Great Lakes Exposition
- 1936 – Dallas, Texas, United States – Texas Centennial Exposition
- 1936–1937 – Johannesburg, South Africa – Empire Exhibition, South Africa
- 1937 – Cleveland, Ohio, United States – Great Lakes Exposition
- 1937 – Dallas, United States – Greater Texas & Pan-American Exposition
- 1937 – Berlin, Germany – International Hunting Exposition
- 1937 – Düsseldorf, Germany – Reichsausstellung Schaffendes Volk
- 1937 – Miami, United States – Pan American Fair (1937)
- 1937 – Paris, France – Exposition Internationale des Arts et Techniques dans la Vie Moderne (1937)
- 1937 – Nagoya, Japan – Nagoya Pan-Pacific Peace Exposition
- 1938 – Berlin, Germany – International Handiworks Exposition
- 1938 – Glasgow, United Kingdom – Empire Exhibition, Scotland 1938
- 1938 – Helsinki, Finland Second International Aeronautic Exhibition
- 1939 – Wellington, New Zealand – New Zealand Centennial Exhibition
- 1939 – Liège, Belgium – Exposition internationale de l'eau (1939)
- 1939 – Zürich, Switzerland – Schweizerische Landesausstellung
- 1939 – Moscow, Soviet Union – All-Union Agricultural Exhibition
- 1939–1940 – New York City, United States – 1939 New York World's Fair (exhibits included The World of Tomorrow, Futurama, Trylon and Perisphere)
- 1939–1940 – San Francisco, California, United States – Golden Gate International Exposition

== 1940s ==
- 1940 – Lisbon, Portugal – Portuguese World Exhibition
- 1940 – Chicago, Illinois, United States – American Negro Exposition
- 1940 – Los Angeles, California, United States – Pacific Mercado (1940) (never held)
- 1940 – Naples, Italy – Mostra Triennale delle Terre Italiane d’Oltremare (Triennial Exhibition of Overseas Italian Territories)
- 1940 – Tokyo, Japan – Grand International Exposition of Japan (1940) (never held)
- 1942 – Los Angeles, California, United States – Cabrillo Fair (1942) (never held)
- 1942 – Rome, Italy – Esposizione universale (1942) (E42) (never held)
- 1943 – Stockholm, Sweden – Norwegian Exhibition
- 1947 – Paris, France – International Exhibition on Urbanism and Housing
- 1948 – Brussels, Belgium – Foire coloniale (1948)
- 1949 – Stockholm, Sweden – Universal Sport Exhibition
- 1949 – Lyon, France – International Exhibition on Urbanism and Housing
- 1949–1950 – Port-au-Prince, Haiti – Exposition internationale du bicentenaire de Port-au-Prince

== 1950s ==
- 1951 – Lille, France – The International Textile Exhibition
- 1951 – London, United Kingdom – Festival of Britain – Skylon
- 1952 – Colombo, Ceylon – Colombo Exhibition
- 1953 – St Louis, Missouri, United States – intended to commemorate the Louisiana Purchase's sesquicentennial, but never held
- 1953 – Manila, Philippines – the Philippines International Fair of 1953, 1 February – 30 April 1953, to show off the recovery of the Philippines from WW2 and as the first democracy in the Far East
- 1953 – Jerusalem, Israel – International Exhibition and Fair Jerusalem Israel Conquest of the desert
- 1953 – Rome, Italy – Agricultural Exposition of Rome EA 53 Rome
- 1954 – Naples, Italy – Oltremare Exhibition – Campi Flegrei
- 1954 – Bogota, Colombia – First International Industry and Commerce Fair of Bogota
- 1954 – Damascus, Syria – "Damascus World Fair".
- 1954–1955 – São Paulo, Brazil – Fourth Centenary Exhibition
- 1955 – Turin, Italy – International Expo of Sport Turin 1955
- 1955 – Helsingborg, Sweden Helsingborg Exhibition 1955
- 1955 – Ciudad Trujillo (Santo Domingo), Dominican Republic – Feria de la Paz y Confraternidad del Mundo Libre
- 1956 – Beit Dagan, Israel – Exhibition of citriculture
- 1957 – Berlin International Building Exposition
- 1958 – Brussels, Belgium – Expo '58 (Exposition Universelle et Internationale de Bruxelles) – Atomium
- 1959 – New Delhi, India – World Agricultural Fair
- 1959 – Moscow, Soviet Union – Exhibition of Achievements of National Economy (VDNKh)

== 1960s ==
- 1960 – cancelled (planned site: Caracas, Venezuela)
- 1961 – Turin, Italy – Exposition International du Travail Expo 61
- 1962 – Seattle, United States – Century 21 Exposition – Space Needle
- 1964 – Lausanne, Switzerland – Expo 64 – Schweizerische Landesausstellung
- 1964–1965 – New York City, United States – 1964/1965 New York World's Fair (note: not sanctioned by the Bureau International des Expositions) – Unisphere
- 1965 – Munich, West Germany – International Exhibition of Transport and Communication
- 1967 – Montreal, Quebec, Canada – Expo 67, (Universal and International Exhibition of 1967)
- 1968 – San Antonio, Texas, United States – HemisFair '68 – Tower of the Americas

== 1970s ==
- 1970 – Osaka, Japan – Expo '70 (Japan World Exposition)
- 1971 – Budapest, Hungary – Expo 71 (Exhibition World of Hunting)
- 1974 – Spokane, Washington, United States – Expo '74 (International Exposition on the Environment) – Riverfront Park
- 1975 – Okinawa, Japan – Expo '75 (International Ocean Exposition)

== 1980s ==
- 1980 – Montreal, Quebec, Canada – Floralies Internationales de Montréal
- 1981 – Plovdiv, Bulgaria – Expo 81
- 1982 – Amsterdam, Netherlands – Floriade 1982
- 1982 – Knoxville, Tennessee, United States – 1982 World's Fair – Sunsphere
- 1984 – New Orleans, Louisiana, United States – 1984 Louisiana World Exposition
- 1984 – Liverpool, United Kingdom – International Garden Festival Liverpool '84
- 1985 – Plovdiv, Bulgaria – Expo 85
- 1985 – Tsukuba, Japan – Expo 85
- 1986 – Vancouver, British Columbia, Canada – Expo 86
- 1988 – Brisbane, Australia – Expo '88
- 1989 – Nagoya, Japan – World Design Exhibition 1989

== 1990s ==
- 1990 – Osaka, Japan – Expo '90
- 1991 – Plovdiv, Bulgaria – Second World Exhibition of inventions of the young
- 1992 – three expositions (1 was cancelled) celebrating 500 years since Christopher Columbus reached the Americas
  - Seville, Spain – Seville Expo '92 Universal Exposition, port where Columbus started his voyage
  - Genoa, Italy – Genoa Expo '92 Specialized Exposition, city where Columbus was born
  - Columbus, Ohio, United States - AmeriFlora '92 Horticultural Exposition, city named in honor of Columbus
  - Chicago, Illinois, United States (Cancelled) – meant to generically represent the Americas-side of Columbus' voyage
- 1992 – Zoetermeer, Netherlands– Floriade 1992
- 1993 – Stuttgart, Germany – Internationale Gartenbauausstellung 93
- 1993 – Daejeon, South Korea – Expo '93
- 1995 – Vienna, Austria which was proposed to be a joint exhibition with Budapest. This was never held
- 1996 – cancelled (planned site: Budapest, Hungary)
- 1998 – Lisbon, Portugal – Expo '98
- 1999 – Kunming, China – Expo '99

== 2000s ==
- 2000 – Hanover, Germany – Expo 2000
- 2000 – Greenwich, London, United Kingdom – Millennium Dome
- 2002 – cancelled (planned site: Metro Manila, Philippines)
- 2002 – cancelled (planned site: Gold Coast, Queensland, Australia)
- 2002 – Haarlemmermeer, Netherlands – Floriade 2002
- 2002 – Biel, Murten, Neuchâtel and Yverdon-les-Bains, Switzerland – Expo.02
- 2003 – Rostock, Germany – Internationale Gartenbauausstellung 2003
- 2004 – cancelled (planned site: Seine-Saint-Denis, France)
- 2004 – Barcelona, Spain – Universal Forum of World Cultures
- 2005 – Aichi, Japan – Expo 2005
- 2006–2007 – Chiang Mai, Thailand – Royal Flora Ratchaphruek 2006
- 2008 – Zaragoza, Spain – Expo 2008

== 2010s ==
- 2010 – Shanghai, China – Expo 2010
- 2012 – Venlo, Netherlands – Floriade 2012
- 2012 – Yeosu, South Korea – Expo 2012
- 2015 – Milan, Italy – Expo 2015
- 2016 – Antalya, Türkiye – Expo 2016
- 2017 – Astana, Kazakhstan – Expo 2017
- 2019 – Beijing, China – Expo 2019

== 2020s ==
- 2021–2022 – Dubai, United Arab Emirates – Expo 2020
- 2022 – Almere, Netherlands – Floriade 2022
- 2023 – cancelled (planned site: Buenos Aires, Argentina)
- 2023–2024 – Doha, Qatar – Expo 2023
- 2024 – Chengdu, China - Expo 2024
- 2025 – Osaka, Japan – Expo 2025
- 2027 – Yokohama, Japan– Expo 2027
- 2027 – Belgrade, Serbia – Expo 2027
- 2027 – İzmir, Türkiye
- 2029–2030 – Nakhon Ratchasima, Thailand – Expo 2029

== 2030s ==
- 2030 – Riyadh, Saudi Arabia – Expo 2030
- 2031 – Minnesota, United States – Expo 2031

== Future bids and candidate cities ==
Several cities plan to bid for the Expo 2035 including Berlin, Germany; New Administrative Capital, Egypt; Busan, South Korea; China in Hong Kong & Shenzhen; and Miami, United States.

== See also ==
- List of World's Fair architecture
- List of tourist attractions worldwide
- List of world expositions
