= Expo '92 (disambiguation) =

Expo '92 is a universal exposition in Seville, Spain.

Expo '92 may also refer to:

- Colombo '92, international exposition in Genoa, Italy
- Floriade 1992, international horticultural exposition in Zoetermeer, Netherlands

== See also ==
- Expo 92 motorcycle Grand Prix
