= Internationale Gartenbauausstellung 93 =

1993 gardening exhibition in Stuttgart, Germany

EXPO 1993 Stuttgart
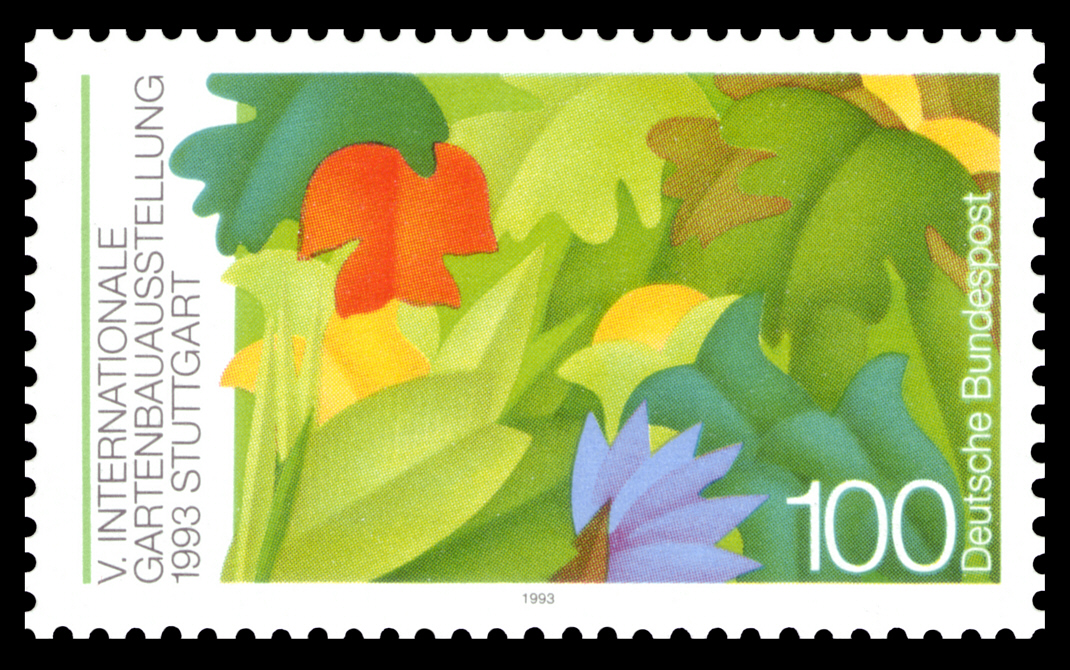
- Stamp for Horticultural Exposition 1993

Overview
- BIE-class: Horticultural exposition
- Name: 1993 World Horticultural Exposition
- Visitors: 7,300,000

Location
- Country: Germany
- City: Stuttgart
- Venue: Wartburg and Killesburg Park

Timeline
- Opening: April 23, 1993
- Closure: October 17, 1993

Horticultural expositions
- Previous: Expo '92 in Zoetermeer
- Next: Expo '99 in Kunming

Specialized expositions
- Previous: Expo '92 in Genoa
- Next: Expo '98 in Lisbon

Universal expositions
- Previous: Expo '92 in Seville
- Next: Expo 2000 in Hanover

Simultaneous
- Specialized: Expo '93

The Internationale Gartenbauausstellung 93 (short: IGA 93) was held in Stuttgart, Germany. Recognised by the Bureau International des Expositions (BIE), the Expo ran from April 23, 1993, to October 17, 1993. Held at Wartenberg and Killesberg parks, the goal was to be visually and functionally integrated with two prominent features of Stuttgart's landscape, the Wartberg and the Leibfriedscher Garten. This was achieved. The long-term goal to create a U-shaped greenbelt around the city (known as the Grünes U) became a reality. The mascot of the horticultural show was "Flori", a bird in a cowboy hat. Overall, 7.3 million people visited the show, exceeding projections of 7 million.

== Application and preparation ==
The event was organized and managed by the Central Association of Horticulture IGA Stuttgart'93 GmbH. The chairman was the then-Mayor Manfred Rommel. As early as 1977 was the preparation of temporary and permanent installations, the Technical Department of the City of Stuttgart, headed by Mayor Hans-Dieter Künne, a postdoctoral civil responsibility. In the Parks Department project groups were formed to support sustainable approach.

== Horticultural show areas ==
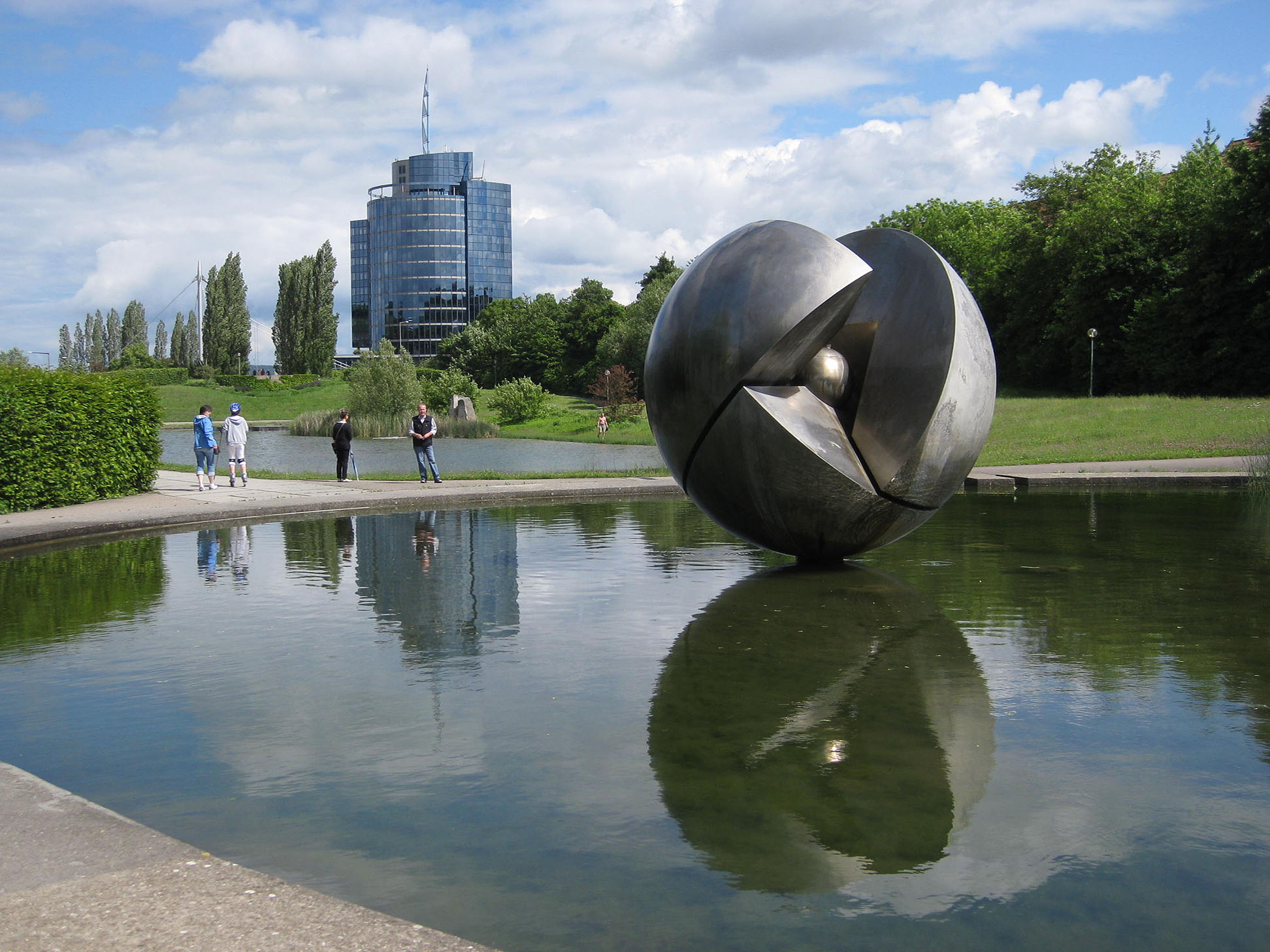
Hans Dieter Bohnet, ball object and water fountains on Egelsee, 1993

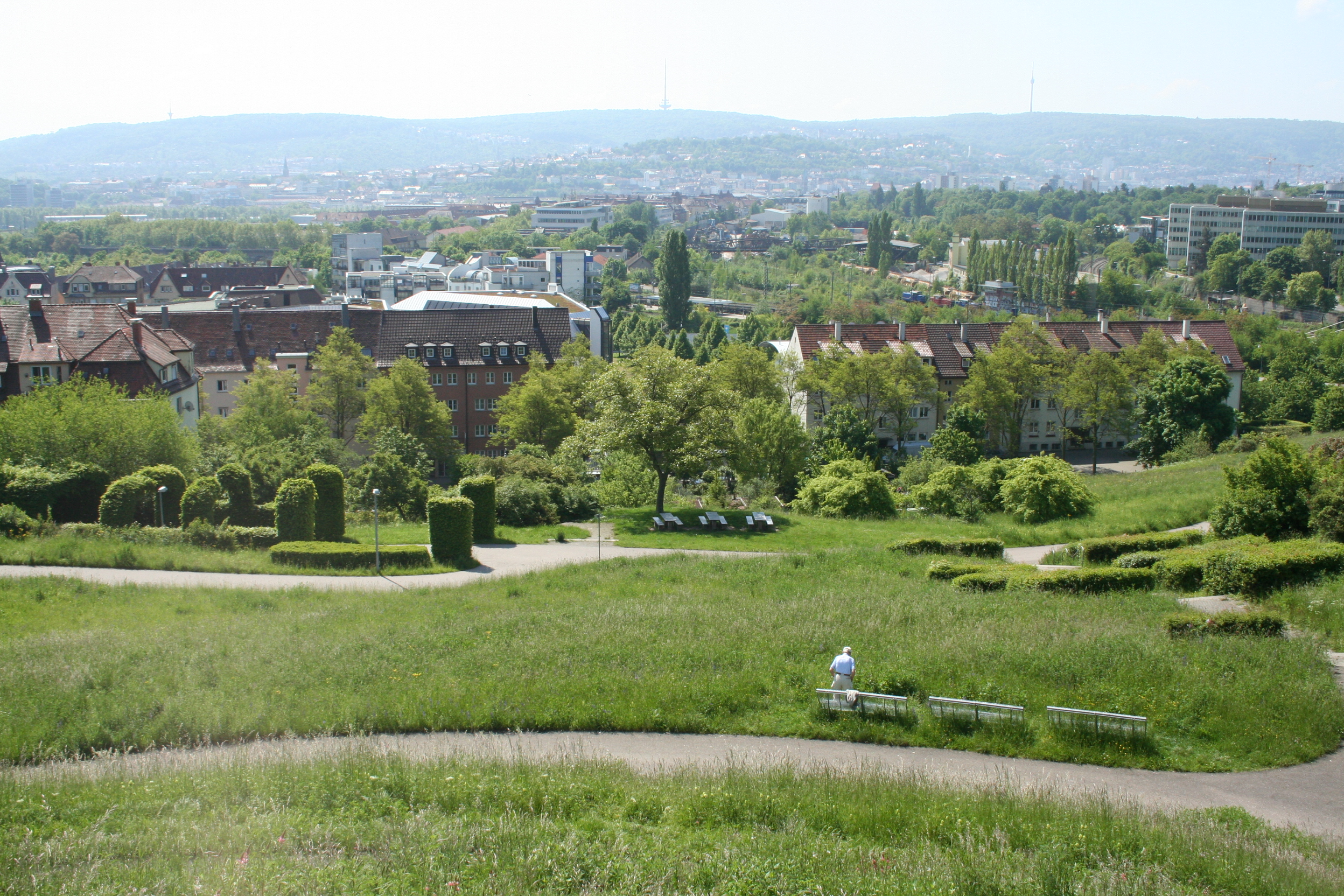
The Leibfriedsche Garden has benefited greatly from the IGA'93; Today it is a well-kept recreational area

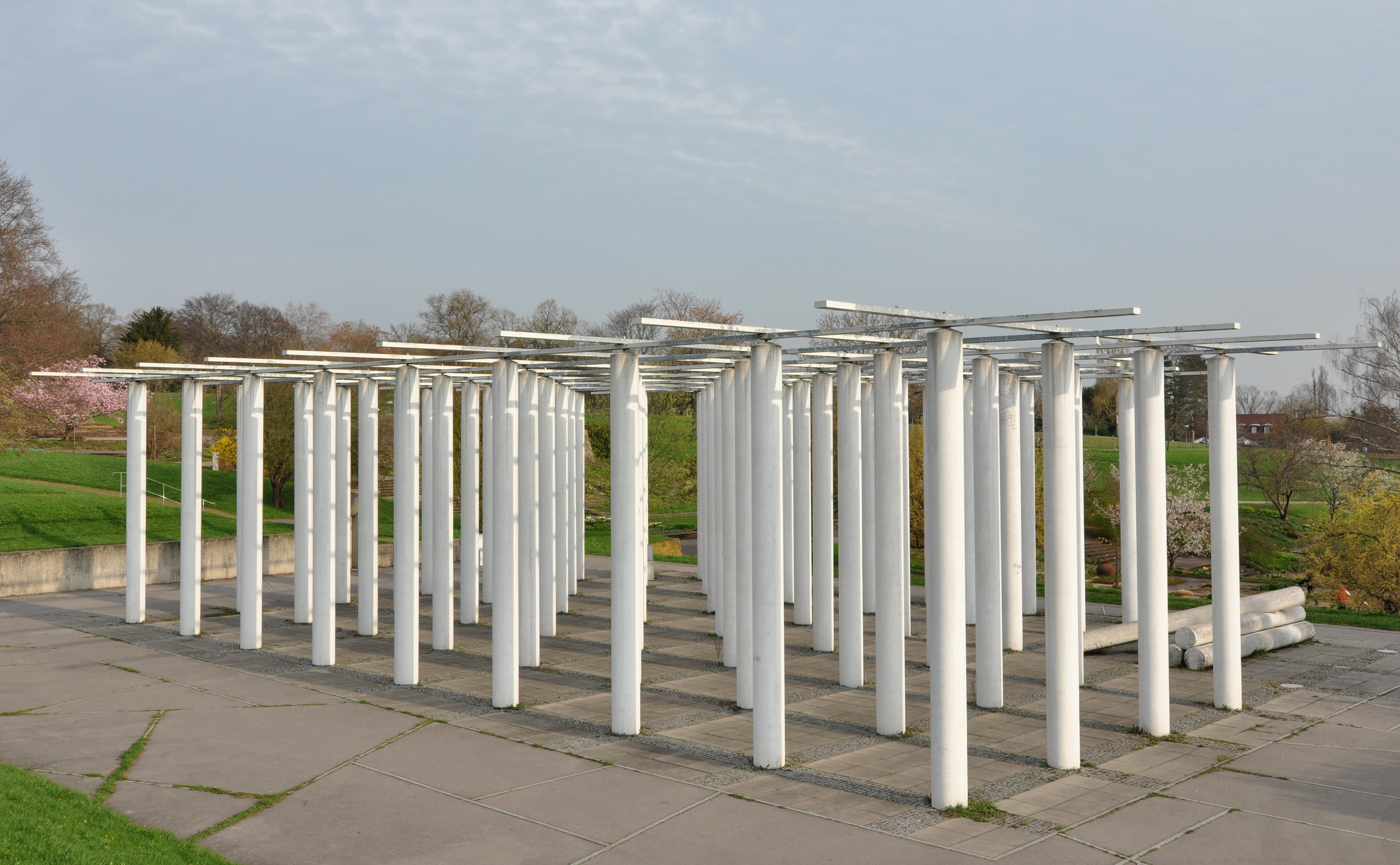
Stangenwald the Killesberg park, built in 1993 by Hans Dieter Schaal

At Wartberg there was a landscape of extensive use, with virtually no public access. Hedges, ditches, dry stone walls and orchards dominated the terrain. No less challenging was the terrain of Leibfried's garden, which had a woodland park of trees.

Two main issues dominated the garden show at Wartberg, the preservation of an intact environment and the commitment to the concerns of people with disabilities. The land at Wartberg slopes were re-parceled. 40 permanent allotments resulting from this measure. The 3.5-kilometre-long (2 mi) network of paths had a width of 5.5 m (18 feet). To remain true to the premise of a responsible treatment of nature, the initiators came regarding the path width that only 3.5 m (11 feet) were asphalted. The edges of one meter width were gravelled.

In Killesburg, the lake in the "Valley of Roses" was deepened and new sealed and equipped for the purpose of oxygen supply with a fountain permanently in operation. An open-air stage was created with 4,000 seats. The large flower meadow was lush (begonias, chrysanthemums, geraniums, marigolds, verbena, zinnia, impatiens, snapdragons and carnations planted).

At the Nations Gardens, 22 nations presented their products on an area of 52,000 square meters. The gardens were connected by wooden walkways. The various countries' typical plants were presented, such as apple (Belgium, Switzerland, Netherlands), olive (Iran, Sardinia and others), palm (Egypt, Angola, Tunisia, India), cherry (China) or grape (Austria, Hungary, Turkey and South Africa). A special garden was the Chinese "Qing Yin Garden", the "garden of beautiful melody". Using wood, brick and sandstone, it was created by the architects and gardeners of the "Middle Kingdom". It is a garden of bamboo and various conifers.

== Bridges ==
Two bridges were built in tubular steel construction. Two other three-arm suspension bridges lead over the Stuttgart North station and the "Heilbronner Straße". The bridge at Löwentor displays the motto "Oben Landschaft, unten Verkehr" ("Landscape above, traffic below"). The planning and construction supervision was Schlaich Bergermann Partner, Stuttgart.

- Brno Steg (1992, in use)
- Footbridge Heilbronnerstraße (1992, in use)
- Lodz Steg (1992, in use)
- Samara web (I) (1992, in use)
- Samara web (II) (1992)
