= Wartberg =

Wartberg may refer to:

- Wartberg ob der Aist, municipality in Austria
- Wartberg an der Krems, municipality in Austria
- Wartberg im Mürztal, municipality in Austria
- the German name for Senec, Slovakia
- Wartberg (Niedenstein), a mountain of Schwalm-Eder-Kreis, Hesse, Germany
- Wartberg (Stuttgart), a mountain of Baden-Württemberg, Germany
- Wartberg (Heilbronn), a mountain of Baden-Württemberg, Germany
- Wartberg culture, a.k.a. Wartberg group

== See also ==
- Wartburg (disambiguation)
