= Leopoldina Ferreira Paulo =

Portuguese anthropologist (1908–1996)

- Born: 12 January 1908; Porto, Portugal
- Died: 1996 (aged 87–88)
- Occupation: Anthropologist
- Known for: First woman to receive a PhD from the University of Porto

Leopoldina Ferreira Paulo (1908–1996) was a physical or biological anthropologist. She was the first woman to be awarded a Doctorate by the University of Porto in Portugal.

== Education ==
Leopoldina Ferreira Paulo' was born in the parish of Vitória in the city of Porto in Portugal on 12 January 1908. She completed high school with distinction in 1928. She then attended the Faculty of Sciences of the University of Porto between 1928 and 1933, graduating in Historical-Natural Sciences. While taking this degree she completed a qualification as a teacher of drawing and, more or less simultaneously, studied a range of transdisciplinary subjects including Aesthetics and Art History at the Faculty of Letters of the University (1930 – 1931), as well as Figure Drawing, Statue Drawing, Living Model Drawing, Ornate Drawing, Modelling and Styling at the School of Fine Arts of the University (1931 – 1933). She also took exams in the subjects of General Mathematics and Descriptive Geometry.

During the first Portuguese colonial exhibition and World's Fair, held in Porto in 1934, Paulo worked under the direction of Prof. António Mendes Correia to present scientific investigations of Indians in Portuguese colonies. She also took part in the first National Congress of Colonial Anthropology (Porto, 1934) where she presented, in collaboration with Drª Emília Duarte de Oliveira, a paper on “Anthropometric Canons of Indigenous Women of the Colonies”. Paulo then taught in the city of Guimarães during the academic year 1933 – 34 before enrolling in and completing a Pedagogical Sciences Course at the Faculty of Arts of the University of Coimbra, Portugal's oldest university. She also taught in private secondary education, in Porto, between 1935 and 1942, while studying for a Doctorate and carrying out other functions within the university. She became assistant professor of anthropology at the Faculty of Sciences of Porto, in 1935. In 1944, she became the first woman to obtain a Doctorate from the University of Porto, after defending a thesis entitled “Some morphological characters of the hand in the Portuguese”. She received widespread publicity in the press for her achievement. However, in an academic atmosphere that remained prejudiced against women, her attempts to secure a permanent staff position at the university were not successful until 1970. She retired in 1976, one year after obtaining tenure.

== Career ==
Paulo became a member of the Sociedade Portuguesa de Antropologia e Etnologia (SPAE – Portuguese Society of Anthropology and Ethnology), which was based at the University of Porto and regularly organized scientific meetings and published a journal. Unlike many similar societies, the SPAE was noted for welcoming women as members. The SPAE was for a time oriented towards physical or biological anthropology, under the influence of its founder, António Mendes Correia (1888 - 1960), as opposed to social or cultural anthropology. This tendency is reflected in the fieldwork of Paulo, as indeed it was in the subject of her Doctoral thesis.

== Research and publications ==
Throughout her academic career, Paulo carried out anthropological research on the peoples of what were at the time Portuguese colonies, under the direction of Mendes Correia. She participated in an Anthropological and Ethnological Mission to Guinea (1946-1947) and was also involved in the work of the Junta de Investigações do Ultramar (Overseas Investigation Board) of the Ministry of the Colonies (Junta do Ultramar) of the authoritarian Estado Novo government. In the 1950s and 1960s she received several scholarships from German institutions. She published numerous scientific works, including:

- Contribuição para o estudo da pigmentação dos portugueses. 1940. (Contribution to the study of pigmentation in the Portuguese)
- Restos humanos pré-históricos do Monte de Pedrogal. 1940. (Prehistoric human remains of Monte do Pedrogal)
- Alguns caracteres morfológicos da mão nos portugueses. 1944. (Some morphological characteristics of the hand in the Portuguese)
- Prognatismo e capacidade craniana no homem. 1944. (Prognathism and cranial capacity in men)
- Os tipos constitucionais e as profissões. 1950. (Constitutional types and professions)
- Corpulência, volume e constituição em português. 1957. (Corpulence, volume and constitution in the Portuguese)
- Impressões digitais nos indígenas da Guiné portuguesa. 1957. (Fingerprints on indigenous people in Portuguese Guinea)
- Contribution à l’étude des ostracodes du Portugal : note sur une nouvelle espéce du genre Herpetocypris. 1969. (Contribution to the study of ostracods in Portugal: note on a new species of the genus Herpetocypris)
- Alguns caracteres descritivos dos cabindas e Angolas. 1970. (Some descriptive characters from Cabindas and Angolas)

== Death ==
Leopoldina Ferreira Paulo died in 1996.
