= Floriade 1992 =

Garden exhibition

Coordinates: 52.0430°N 4.4680°E

EXPO 1992 Zoetermeer

Overview
- BIE-class: Horticultural exposition
- Name: Floriade 1992
- Area: 168 acres
- Visitors: 3.36 million

Location
- Country: Netherlands
- City: Zoetermeer
- Venue: Rokkeveen

Timeline
- Opening: April 9, 1992
- Closure: October 10, 1992

Horticultural expositions
- Previous: Expo '90 in Osaka
- Next: 1993 World Horticultural Exposition in Stuttgart

Specialized expositions
- Previous: Expo 91 in Plovdiv
- Next: Taejŏn Expo '93 in Taejŏn

Universal expositions
- Previous: Expo '70 in Osaka
- Next: Expo 2000 in Hannover

Simultaneous
- Universal: Seville Expo '92
- Specialized: Genoa Expo '92

Floriade 1992 was an international garden exhibition held in Zoetermeer, Netherlands, recognized by the Bureau International des Expositions (BIE) and organized under the authority of the Dutch Ministry of Agriculture and Fisheries. The Floriade ran from April 9 to October 10, 1992, and was held on a converted pasture outside Zoetermeer near The Hague. The exhibition covered 168 acres and had participants from more than 20 countries. Thirteen foreign countries participated (Germany, India, Japan, Belgium, France, Great Britain, Austria, Italy, Hungary, Poland, Russia, Thailand and Indonesia). The Floriade hosted 3.36 million visitors.

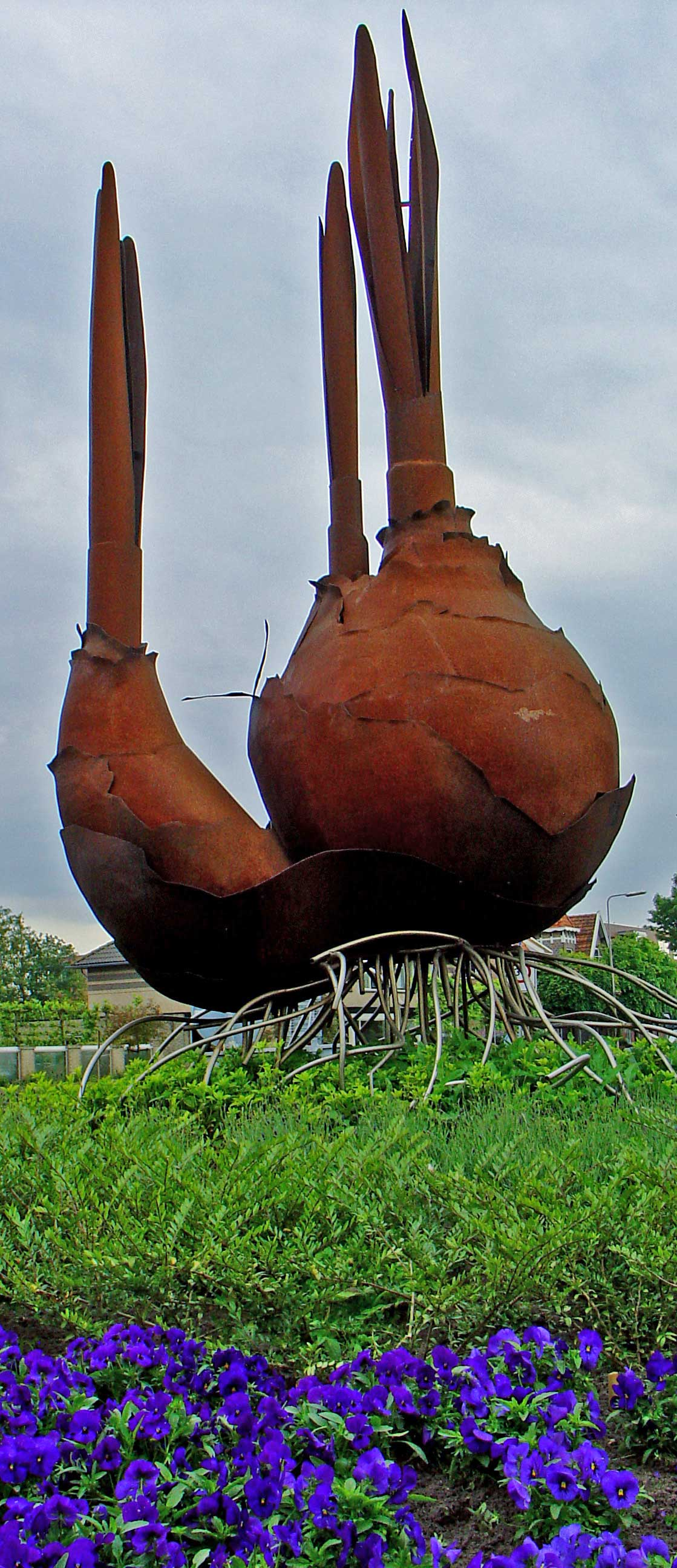
Moeder en Kind (Mother and Child), sculpture of an onion, created for the Expo

The Floriade site was also the setting for a sculpture exhibition, in which many artists including Rob Scholte helped construct an exhibition called "The Colossus of Zoetermeer". The exhibition was officially opened by Queen Beatrix. A special tram line was built to service the exhibition.
