= Crystal Palace (Porto) =

Former exhibition building in Porto, Portugal

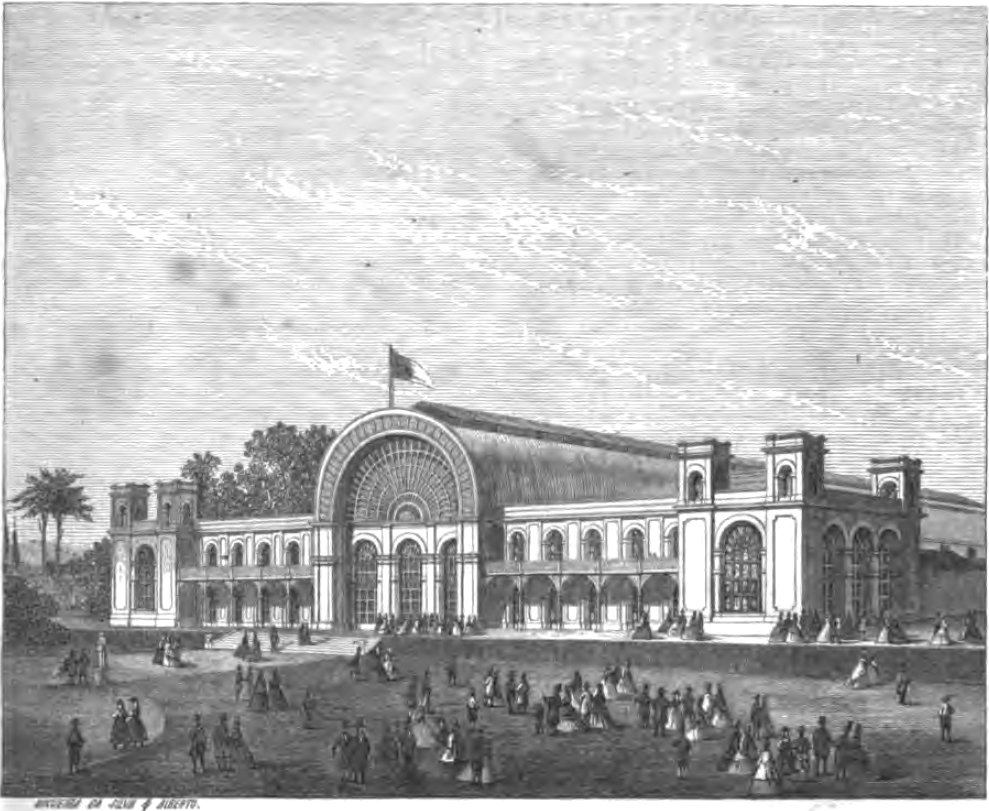
- View of the Crystal Palace, which was demolished in 1951
- Interactive map of the Crystal Palace (Porto) area

General information
- Type: Exhibition Centre
- Location: Porto, Portugal
- Coordinates: 41°08′49″N 8°37′33″W
- Construction started: 3 September 1861
- Inaugurated: 18 September 1865

Technical details
- Structural system: Granite, iron and glass

Design and construction
- Architect: Thomas Dillen Jones
- Civil engineer: Francis Webb Sheilds

The Crystal Palace (O Palácio de Cristal) in Portugal's second largest city of Porto was inspired by The Crystal Palace in London. It was inaugurated in 1865 to host the 1865 International Exhibition. Eventually falling into disrepair, it was demolished in 1951 to make way for a Sports Pavilion, today known as the Rosa Mota Pavilion, named after the Portuguese marathon runner.

== Construction ==
Porto's Crystal Palace was designed by English architect Thomas Dillen Jones and the Anglo-Irish engineer Francis Webb Sheilds. It was built at Torre da Marca on the edge of the city centre in granite, iron and glass, with the Crystal Palace in London serving as a model, as Jones and Sheilds had both worked on that building. Designed to host the 1865 International Exhibition in Porto, it was funded by Porto's Industrial Association, which formed the Sociedade de Palácio de Cristal Portuense (Porto Crystal Palace Company) in 1854. It was 150 metres long and 72 metres wide and was divided into three sections: a central nave (150 metres long and 25 metres wide), and two side aisles (each 100 metres long and 9 metres wide), and included two theatres. The first stone was laid on 3 September 1861, with King D. Pedro V in attendance, shortly before his death. The Crystal Palace was inaugurated on 18 September in 1865 by King D. Luís. The International Exhibition attracted over 3000 exhibitors, including 499 from France, 265 from Germany, 107 from Britain, 89 from Belgium and 62 from Brazil, as well as Spaniards, Danes, Russians, Dutch, and exhibitors from Turkey, the United States and Japan.

== Activities ==
Surrounded by landscaped gardens, the Palácio de Cristal became a popular place for residents of Porto to visit, even when there were no events in progress. Over its 86 years of existence, the Crystal Palace hosted many exhibitions, including one devoted to roses in 1879 and an agricultural exhibition in 1903. It was used for a reception in 1922 to celebrate the first air crossing of the southern Atlantic by Carlos Viegas Gago Coutinho and Artur de Sacadura Cabral, who flew from Lisbon to Rio de Janeiro. The building contained a pipe organ that was one of the largest in the world and hosted concerts by noted Portuguese performers such as the pianist and composer José Vianna da Motta and the cellist Guilhermina Suggia. It also hosted social events for the elite of Porto, such as Balls.

== Gardens ==
The Crystal Palace gardens, which cover about 8 hectares and have views over the River Douro, were landscaped when the Crystal Palace was built and include rhododendrons, camellias, araucarias, ginkgoes, and beech trees, in addition to fountains and statues. There are also several themed gardens including the Garden of Feelings, the Garden of Aromatic Plants, and a Rose Garden. The gardens also contain a chapel devoted to the King of Sardinia, who died while exiled in Porto in 1849. This small temple predates the Crystal Palace, having been erected by the late King's sister in 1854. A museum, in the 19th-century Quinta da Macieirinha, provides an insight into the lifestyle and culture of the late 1800s. It was occupied by the King of Sardinia during his brief exile.

== Degradation and demolition ==
In the first decades of the 20th century the building suffered a lack of income and, consequently, a lack of maintenance, and showed signs of degradation and neglect. In view of its condition, the City Council of Porto bought it in 1933, together with the gardens. This was to facilitate the holding of the Portuguese colonial exhibition, which opened in June 1934, being planned by the dictatorial Estado Novo regime as a means of creating a favourable image of Portugal's role as a colonial power, at a time when discontent was beginning to emerge in its colonies. At this exhibition a map was unveiled with the title of "Portugal is not a small country", in which the Portuguese colonies appear superimposed on the European continent. This event also served as a trial run for the Portuguese World Exhibition held in 1940 in the Portuguese capital of Lisbon.

The palace was demolished in 1951, with a reinforced-concrete dome that became known as the UFO quickly erected in its place, in order to host the 1952 Roller Hockey World Cup. Initially known as the Sports Pavilion it was renamed in 1991 in honour of Rosa Mota, the Olympic-winning marathon runner who came from Porto. There was much popular opposition to the building's destruction, leading the authorities to retain the name for the surrounding gardens, which are known as the Jardins do Palacio de Cristal.
