= National Ecuadorian Exposition =

1909 world's fair in Quinto, Ecuador

1909 Quito
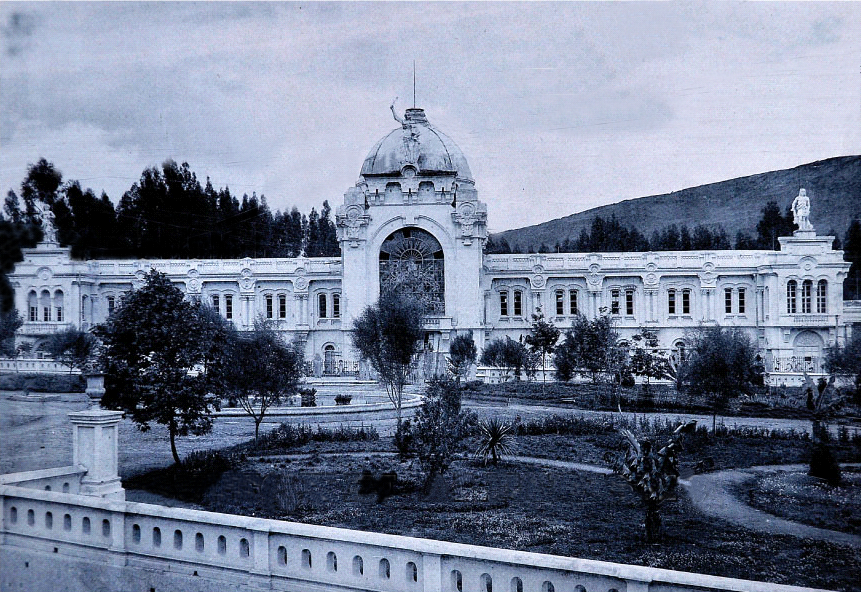
- Exhibition Palace

Overview
- BIE-class: Unrecognized exposition
- Name: National Ecuadorian Exposition
- Organized by: Eloy Alfaro

Participant(s)
- Countries: 9

Location
- Country: Ecuador
- City: Quito
- Venue: Recoleta
- Coordinates: 0°13′51.6″S 78°30′44.28″W

Timeline
- Opening: 10 August 1909

The National Ecuadorian Exposition was a world's fair held in Quito in 1909 to mark 100 years since the start of the campaign for Ecuadorian independence from Spain.

The Palace of the Exhibition was formally opened on 10 August 1909 to mark 100 years since the "First Cry for Independence". The fair opened on 8 September.

== Participating countries ==
Countries that presented included Chile, Colombia, France, Japan, Spain, Italy, Peru and the USA.

Ecuador's own pavilion was made from reinforced concrete, two stories tall with a 30 metre dome. On top of the dome there was a statue of an Andean condor with outstretched wings.

The Japanese pavilion was made from Guayaquil wood, and was painted red and white.

The United States pavilion was designed by Francisco Durini in the style of the White House.

== Prizes ==
Prizes were awarded on 28 September 1909, with winners including the cognac manufacturer Fromy, Rogée & Co, presidents of all participating countries, and Eloy Alfaro the 'protector' of the exhibition.

== Legacy ==
The Chilean pavilion was given to the National Conservatory of Music, the Colombia pavilion to the city, the American pavilion, to the Military Committee. the Italian pavilion to the Ladies Committee, and an Art Nouveau style cafe became the home of the Ministry of National Defence in 1937.

A Japanese kiosk was given to the commerce of Quito and Eloy Alfaro gave the Japanese pavilion to the newly formed Sociedad Geografica de Quito (SGQ).
