= Expo 85 (Plovdiv, Bulgaria) =

International exposition

1985 Plovdiv

Overview
- BIE-class: Specialized exposition
- Name: Expo 1985 Plovdiv
- Motto: The Achievements of Young Inventors
- Building(s): International Fair Plovdiv
- Area: 5,8 Ha
- Visitors: 1,000,000

Participant(s)
- Countries: 73

Location
- Country: Bulgaria
- City: Plovdiv

Timeline
- Opening: November 4, 1985
- Closure: November 30, 1985

Specialized expositions
- Previous: 1984 Louisiana World Exposition in New Orleans
- Next: Expo 86 in Vancouver

Universal
- Previous: Expo '70 in Osaka
- Next: Seville Expo '92 in Seville

Simultaneous
- Specialized: Tsukuba 1985

Expo 1985 Plovdiv was an international exposition that took place from November 4–30, 1985 in Plovdiv, Bulgaria. The exhibition had the theme "The Achievements of Young Inventors". The specialized exhibition was the 24th held by the Bureau International des Expositions and the second held in Plovdiv. Another specialized exposition, Expo '85 in Tsukuba, Japan occurred the same year.

== Facts ==
- Participating countries: 73
- Visitors: 1,000,000

== See also ==
- List of world's fairs
