= International Fair Plovdiv =

Bulgaria's largest and oldest international trade fair

Coordinates: 42°09′29″N 24°45′25″E

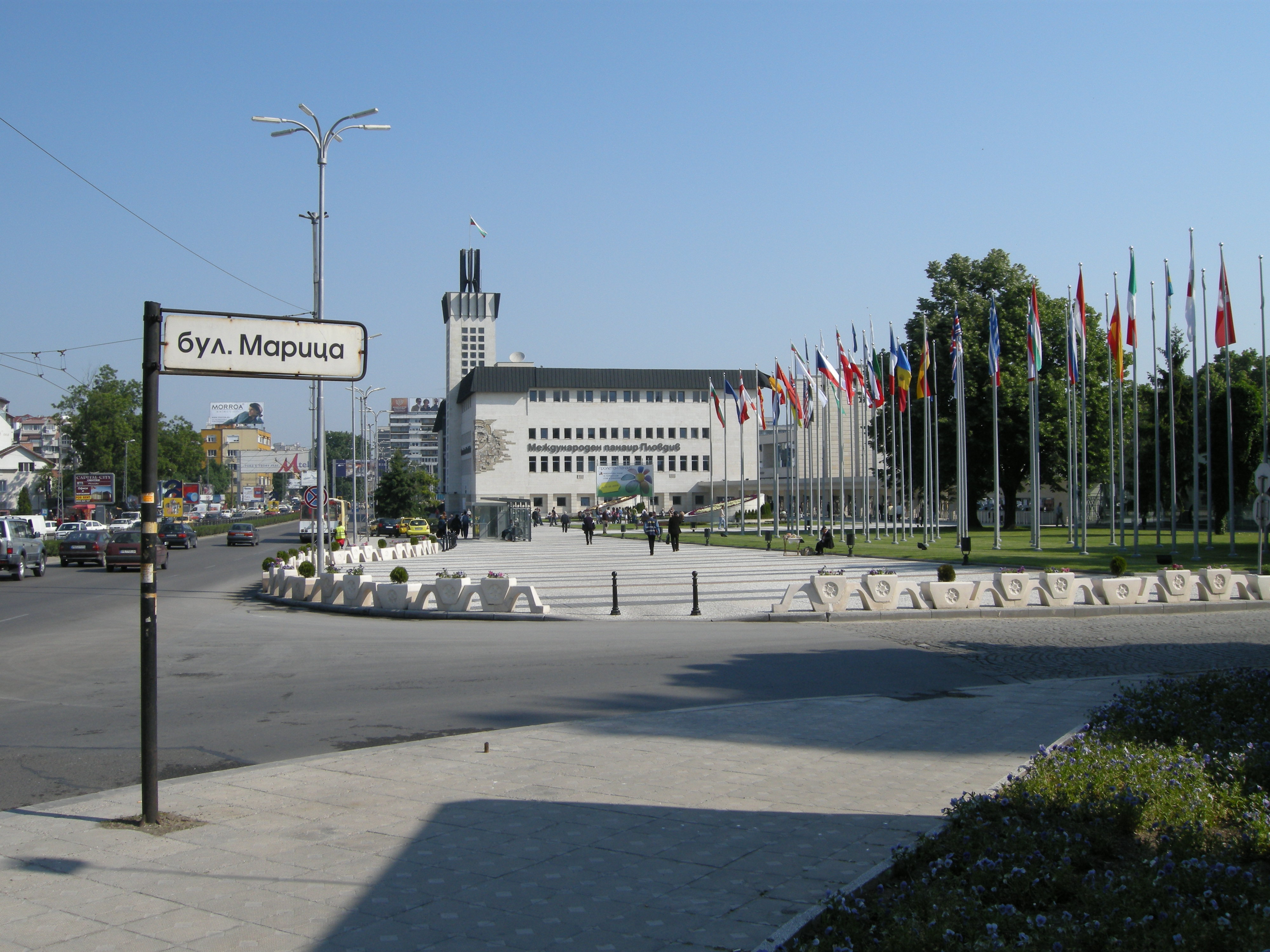
The fair ground

Logo of International Fair Plovdiv

International Fair Plovdiv (Bulgarian: Международен панаир Пловдив), held in Plovdiv, is Bulgaria's largest and oldest international trade fair.

== History ==
It was established in August 1892 as an industrial and agricultural show, and attracts more than 600,000 visitors from many countries.

During its first year, the Plovdiv Fair had an exhibition area of 90,000 m^{2}, participants from 25 countries and 167,000 visitors during its two and a half months.

The fair has been held annually since 1933.

A National Industrial Exhibition was organized in 1933 that had 424 exhibitors and 120,000 visitors, being the first sample fair in Plovdiv. A second followed in 1934, when the Plovdiv Fair was proclaimed permanent and the only in Bulgaria on 16 May. The fair officially became an international one by joining Union des Foires Internationales (UFI) in 1936, when over 1,000 Bulgarian and 385 foreign companies took part.

The USSR first took part in the fair in 1940. Soviet agricultural tractors and other goods were offered for export to Bulgaria, but the Axis attack on the USSR in 1941 brought the trade to a halt.

In 1948-1949, the architectural complex of the International Fair was built, which was later used in other public events between fairs.

It was used for Expo 81, Expo 85 and Expo 91.

The modern International Fair Plovdiv is situated in a large-scale exhibition complex of 360,000 m^{2}, of which 95,000 m^{2} exhibition area (and 60,000 m^{2} indoor). The fair has 24 multifunctional pavilions and has the largest capacity in Southeastern Europe. Some 40 shows are held a year, in which 7,000 exhibitors from 58 countries participate.
