= Tropical & Subtropical Arboretum =

Arboretum and botanical garden in Okinawa, Japan

Coordinates: 26°40′52.0″N 127°52′52.3″E

Tropical & Subtropical Arboretum 熱帯・亜熱帯都市緑化植物園
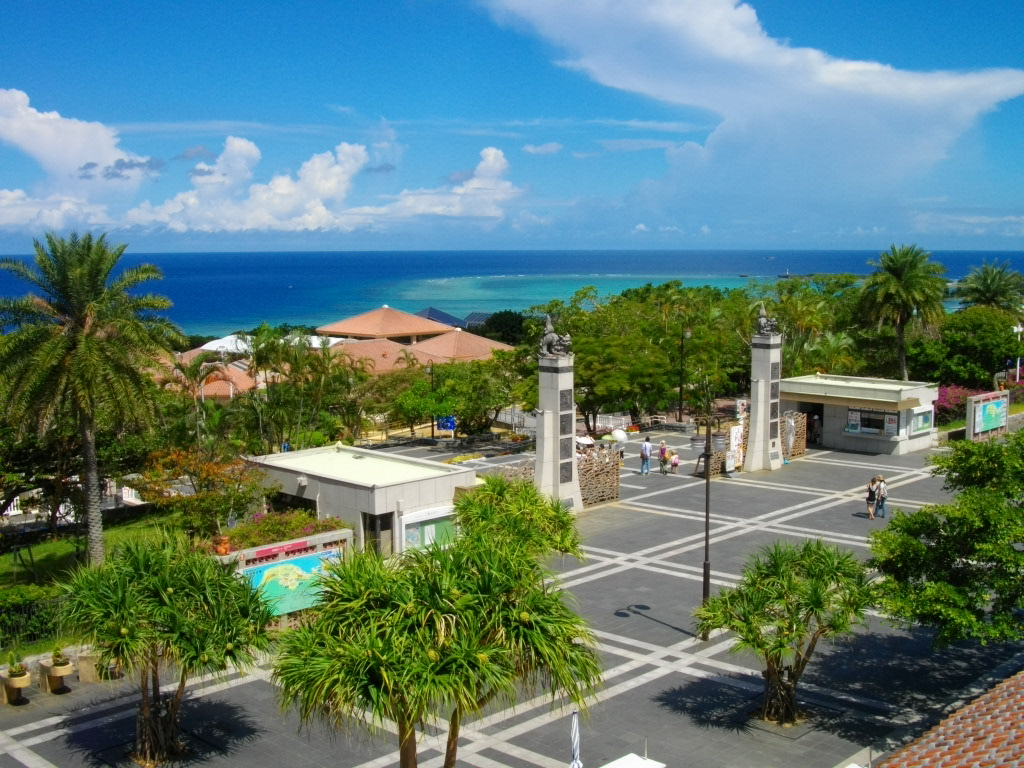
- Interactive map of Tropical & Subtropical Arboretum 熱帯・亜熱帯都市緑化植物園
- Type: Botanical

The Tropical & Subtropical Arboretum (熱帯・亜熱帯都市緑化植物園, Nettai Anettai Toshi Ryokka Shokubutsuen) is a 9-hectare (22-acre) arboretum and botanical garden located in the southern tip of the Ocean Expo Park at Ishikawa 424, Motobu-cho, Kunigami-gun, Okinawa, Japan. It is open daily without charge.

The arboretum was established in August 1976 on the site of the 1975 Okinawa Ocean Expo, and describes itself as the only tropical and subtropical arboretum in Japan with Okinawan climate. Its mission is education and the promotion of the urban afforestation, with sample gardens including nearly 37,500 plants representing 320 species of tropical and subtropical plants. Major arboretum features include an herb garden, hedge & vine area, ground cover area, street trees, and sections for salt and wind tolerant trees, palm trees, and bushes.

There is an aquarium in the botanical garden where rainforest fish such as Arapaima and various species of Arowana, Catfish, and Freshwater Stingray are bred.

== See also ==
- Okinawa Churaumi Aquarium (Facilities in Ocean Expo Park)
- Expo '75
- List of botanical gardens in Japan
