= Floralies Internationales de Montréal =

1980 horticultural exposition

EXPO 1980 Montreal
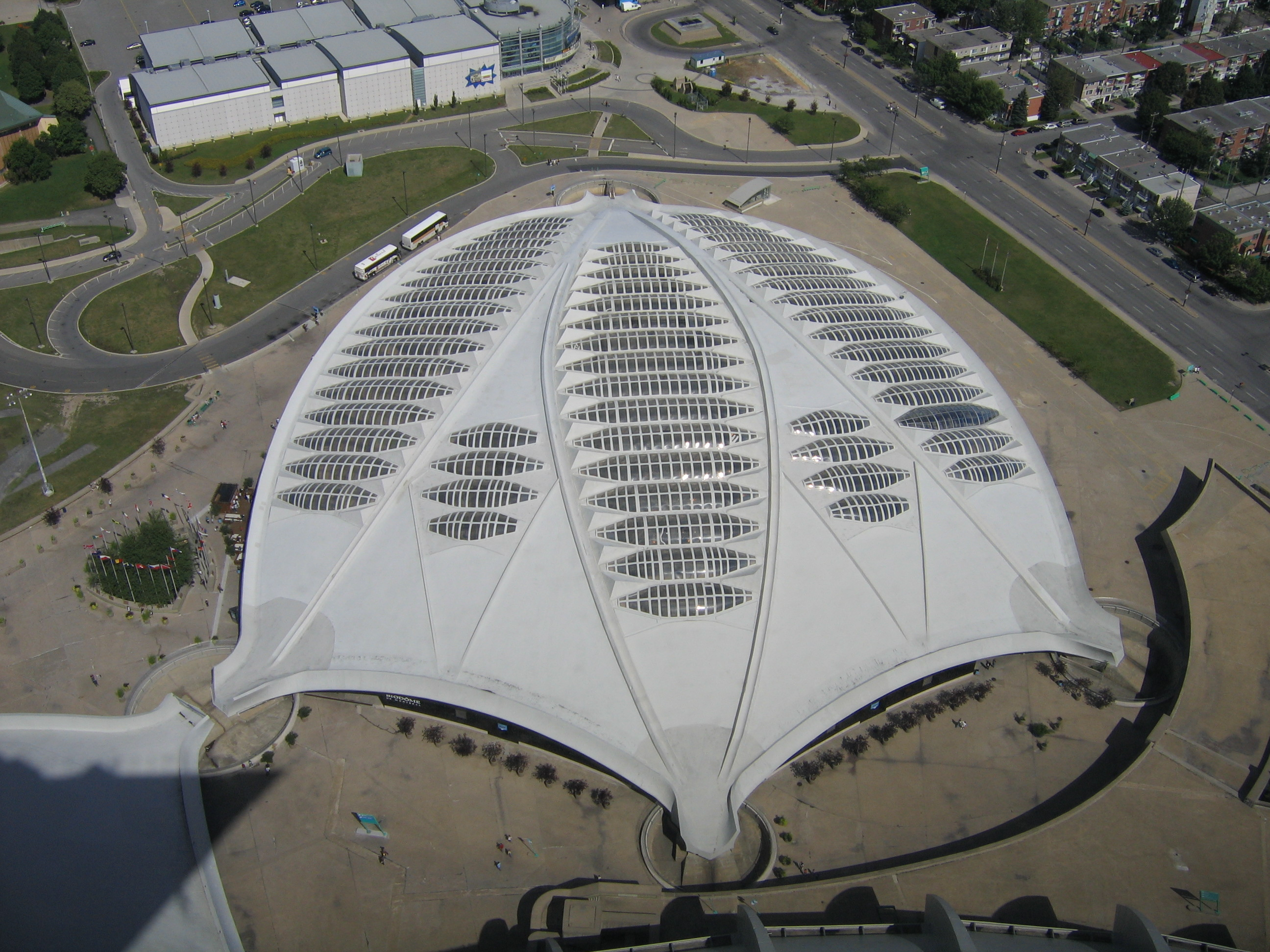
- The 1976 Olympic Velodrome, venue of the indoor exhibits

Overview
- BIE-class: Horticultural exposition
- Name: Floralies Internationales de Montréal

Participant(s)
- Countries: 23

Location
- Country: Canada
- City: Montreal
- Coordinates: 45°30′21.2″N 73°31′39.1″W

Timeline
- Opening: May 17, 1980
- Closure: September 1, 1980

Horticultural expositions
- Previous: Wiener Internationale Gartenschau 74 in Vienna
- Next: Floriade 1982 in Amsterdam

Specialized expositions
- Previous: Expo '75 in Okinawa
- Next: Expo 81 in Plovdiv

Universal expositions
- Previous: Expo '70 in Osaka
- Next: Seville Expo '92 in Seville

The Floralies Internationales de Montréal was the 8th international horticultural exposition recognized by the Bureau of International Expositions. It was held during the spring and summer of 1980, from May 17 to September 1. The Expo was split in two sequential exhibitions, starting with an indoor event in the former Montreal Olympic Velodrome and later on different gardens on Notre Dame Island, the site of the Expo 67. 17 countries were represented at the indoor exhibition and the Velodrome was converted to the Montreal Biodome afterwards. The indoor exhibition opened on May 17 and closed May 29. The gardens at the outdoor part opened on May 31. 12 countries showed their gardens to the public during the summer until September 1.

== Locations ==
- Interior flower show: Olympic Velodrome (May 17, 1980 to May 29, 1980)
- Outdoor flower show: Notre Dame Island (May 31, 1980 to September 1, 1980)

== Participating countries and square footage ==
Interior Floralies	Exterior Floralies
South Africa (50); Belgium (325); Canada (240 and 350); Cameroon (90); China (300); Colombia (185); Costa Rica (70); Spain |(80); United States (305 et 105); France (290); Guatemala (80); Netherlands (300); Indonesia (80); Italy (390); Japan (110); Peru (60); Venezuela (140)	Austria (500); Belgium (3300); Canada (3700); Spain (250); United States (6500); Israel; Spain (5200); Italy (1500); Mexico (300); Peru (250); Portugal (400); United Kingdom (3400); Czechoslovakia (300)
