= Fromy, Rogée & Co =

French cognac manufacturing company

Fromy, Rogée & Co (French: Fromy, Rogée et Cie) was a cognac manufacturer based in Saint-Jean-d'Angély, Charente-Maritime department in southwestern France.

== History ==
The company was founded in 1815 by François Fromy. His son Frédéric and then his son Eugène Rogée succeeded him. His grandson Eugène Rogée-Fromy constructed the headquarters around 1880. The company received a number of rewards for its products, such as the Grand Prix in Hanoi 1902, in St. Louis 1904, Milan 1909, Seattle 1909, Quito 1906, Charleroi 1911 and Casablanca 1915. It was also member of the jury in Paris 1900, Liege 1905, Bordeaux 1907, London 1908, Brussels 1910, Turin 1911, Gand 1913 and Strasbourg 1919. It received an imperial and royal warrant of appointment to the Austro-Hungarian court.

The company ceased production a little before the outbreak of World War II. The headquarter buildings were placed under heritage protection.
