= Portuguese colonial exhibition =

World's fair

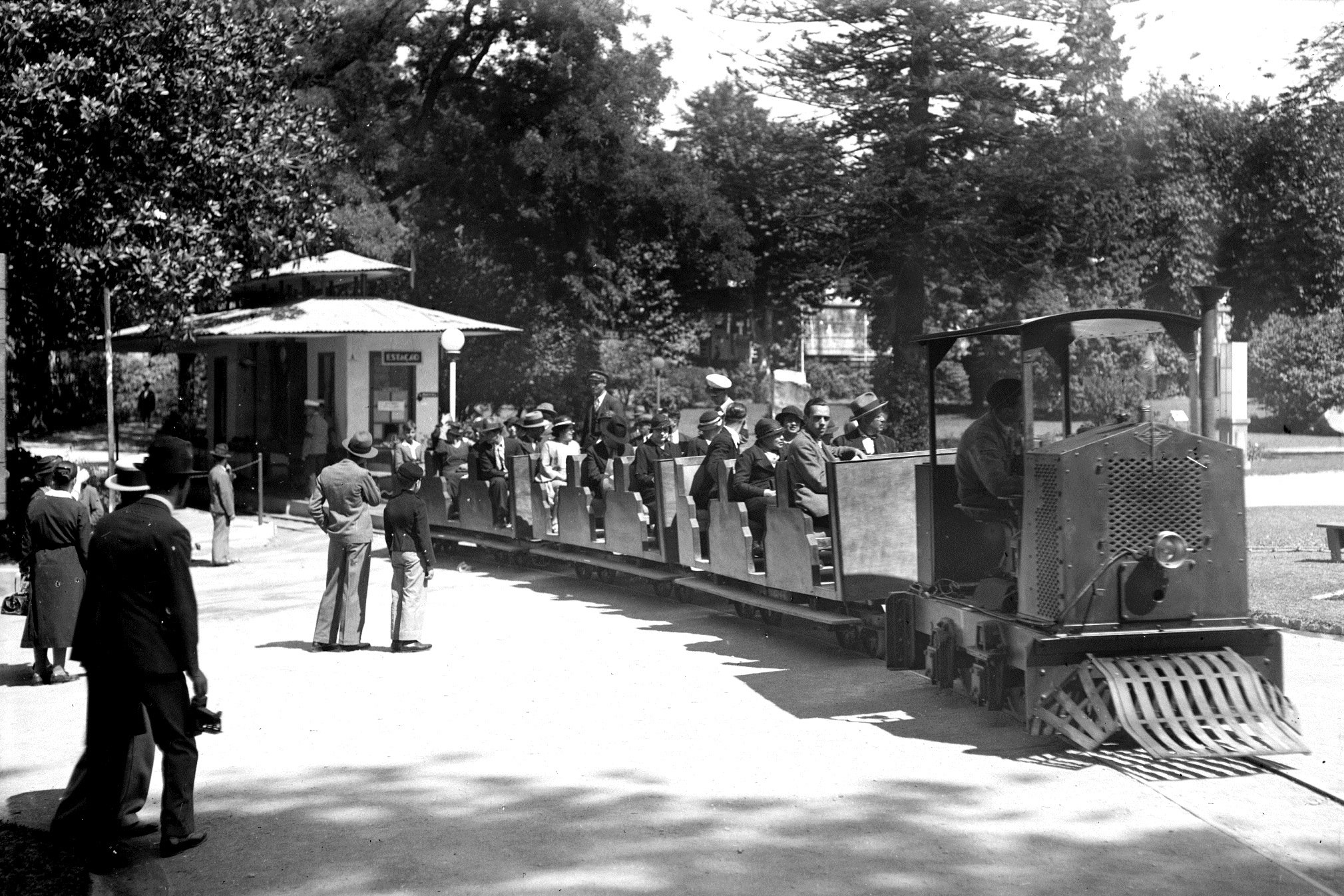

Overview
- BIE-class: Unrecognized exposition
- Building(s): Palácio de Cristal
- Visitors: 1.5 million
- Organized by: Henrique Galvão

Location
- Country: Portugal
- City: Porto
- Coordinates: 41°08′48.76″N 8°37′33.56″W

Timeline
- Opening: 16 June 1934
- Closure: 30 September 1934

The Portuguese colonial exhibition was a world's fair held in Porto, Portugal in 1934 to display achievements of Portugal's colonies in Africa and Asia and allow the visitors to travel throughout the empire in a metaphorical sense.

Portugal's director of 'Colonial Show Fairs' Henrique Galvão who had represented Portugal at the Paris Colonial Exposition in 1931 was made the technical director for this exhibition.

It was decided to re-use the Palácio de Cristal which had been constructed for an earlier exhibition in Porto.

It ran from 16 June to 30 September and by the time it had closed there had been 1.5 million visitors.

== Exhibits ==
The Exhibition featured over 400 exhibits placed around streets that were named after different areas of the Portuguese Empire. The exhibits came from Portugal itself (Braga, Chaves, Leixões, Matosinhos and Porto), Angola, Cape Verde, Guinea (Guinea-Bissau), India, Macao (including a reproduction of the Guia lighthouse), Mozambique, São Tomé and Príncipe, and Timor (Portuguese Timor).

There were reproductions of villages from different colonies and of the Padrões of Dighton and Yellala, along with a zoo, restaurants a theatre, a cinema which showed 'The Dawn Patrol and an amusement park. The Macao pavilion included a teahouse and Chinese musicians while India was represented by a Hindu temple.

== Indigenous presence ==
As similar to other colonial exhibitions in Europe, native people from the colonies were present at the exhibition as features of the exhibits and as sources of anthropological study. Reports say that 324 native people were at the colonial exhibition but only 185 were officially given assistance. The indigenous people present were also the subjects of portraits such as those by the artist Eduardo Malta which were put to use as picture postcards. Photography taken by Fotografia Alvão also involved the natives present at the exhibition. While the indigenous people of the colonies were referred to as Portuguese citizens, they were also treated as being of the classification "indigenous" and were viewed as curiosities from the colonies.
