= Expo 91 =

International exposition in Plovdiv, Bulgaria

1991 Plovdiv

Overview
- BIE-class: Specialized exposition
- Name: EXPO Plovdiv 1991
- Motto: Young inventors at the service of world peace
- Building(s): International Fair Plovdiv

Location
- Country: Bulgaria
- City: Plovdiv

Timeline
- Opening: June 7 1991
- Closure: July 7 1991

Specialized expositions
- Previous: World Expo 88 in Brisbane
- Next: Genoa Expo '92 in Genoa

Universal
- Previous: Expo '70 in Osaka
- Next: Seville Expo '92 in Seville

The International Exhibition in Plovdiv was an international exhibition that was held from June 7 to July 7 of 1991 in the city of Plovdiv, Bulgaria, under the theme of "The creative activity of young inventors at the service of a world peace." The exhibition was coordinated by the Bureau International des Expositions.

== Organizers ==
The organizers of the exhibition were:

- The Ministry of Economy and Planning of Bulgaria
- The Chamber of Commerce and Industry of Bulgaria
- The Republican Council of scientific and technical creativity of the youth of Bulgaria
- International Foundation "Ludmila Jivkova"
- The Institute of inventions and rationalizations.

The exhibition was organized with the cooperation of the World Intellectual Property Organization, a specialized agency of the United Nations.

== See also ==
- International Inventions Exhibition: 1885 in London
- List of world's fairs
