= Expo 85 (Tsukuba, Japan) =

1985 world's fair held in Ibaraki, Japan

Tsukuba Expo '85
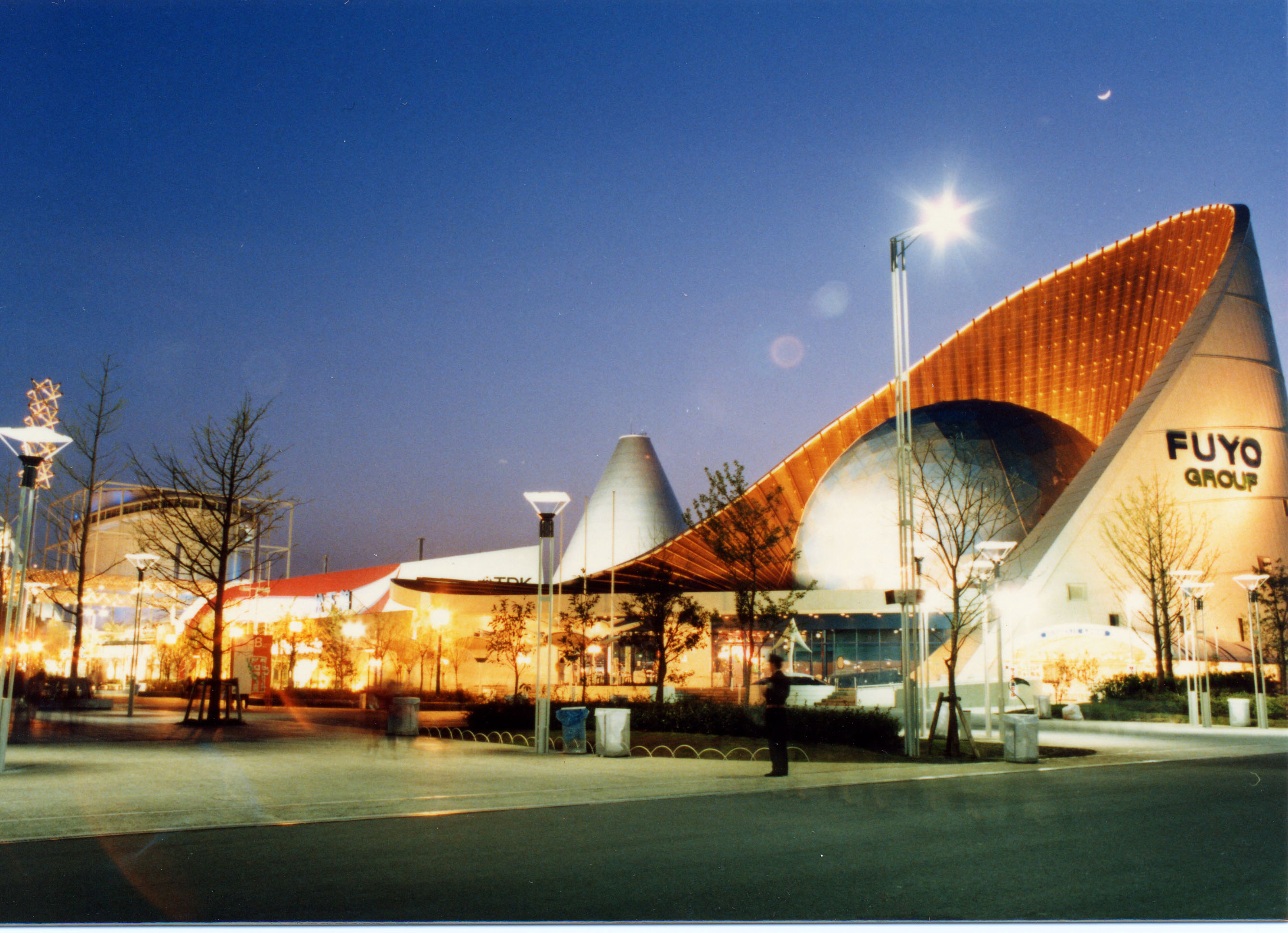
- Fuyō Pavilion

Overview
- BIE-class: Specialized exposition
- Category: International specialized exposition
- Name: Tsukuba Expo '85
- Motto: Dwellings and surroundings – Science and Technology for Man at Home
- Area: 102 hectares (250 acres)
- Visitors: 20,334,727
- Mascot: Cosmo Hoshimaru

Participant(s)
- Countries: 48
- Organizations: 3
- Business: 18

Location
- Country: Japan
- City: Tsukuba Science City

Timeline
- Opening: March 17, 1985
- Closure: September 16, 1985

Specialized expositions
- Previous: 1984 Louisiana World Exposition in New Orleans
- Next: Expo 86 in Vancouver

Universal expositions
- Previous: Expo '70 in Osaka
- Next: Seville Expo '92 in Seville

Horticultural expositions
- Previous: International Garden Festival in Liverpool
- Next: Expo '90 in Osaka

Simultaneous
- Specialized: Expo 85 in Plovdiv

Expo '85, officially called the International Exhibition, Tsukuba Japan 1985 (国際科学技術博覧会, Kokusai Kagaku Gijutsu Hakurankai; "The International Science Technology Exposition"), was a world's fair held in Tsukuba Science City, (Note: Tsukuba Science City is a planned city focused on technology north of Tokyo, not a municipality name. city of Tsukuba was established in 1987, after closure of Expo '85.) Ibaraki, Japan between Sunday, March 17 and Monday, September 16, 1985. The main venue was located in town of Yatabe, and the sub venue was in village of Sakura. The theme of the fair was "Dwellings and surroundings – Science and Technology for Man at Home". Attendance was over 20 million and 48 countries participated, along with several companies.

== The exposition ==
The exhibition recognised by the Bureau International des Expositions (BIE), was devoted to the advancements in science and technology, and sought to highlight the impact of technological evolution on ordinary life to ensure that science and technology would be accessible to everyone.

The exhibition had a double intention. It was expected that the exposition would showcase Japan as a country of technological innovation. In addition, organisers hoped that the Expo would give some much needed exposure to Tsukuba, a city created 2 decades before as a scientific center, without much success.

Among the attractions of the exposition was the first Jumbotron, a huge TV screen developed by the Japanese firm Sony.

Grouped by continent, the participant countries were as follows:

Africa

- Egypt
- Ivory Coast
- Kenya
- Senegal
- Seychelles
- Tunisia
- Zambia

Asia

- Brunei
- China
- Indonesia
- Iran
- Japan
- South Korea
- Nepal
- Philippines
- Sri Lanka
- Thailand

The Americas

- Brazil
- Belize
- Canada
- Costa Rica
- Dominican Republic
- Jamaica
- Panama
- United States
- Uruguay

Europe

- Belgium
- Bulgaria
- France
- West Germany
- Italy
- Portugal
- Sweden
- Switzerland
- Soviet Union
- Turkey
- United Kingdom
- Yugoslavia

Oceania

- Australia
- Fiji
- Kiribati
- Nauru
- Papua New Guinea
- Samoa
- Solomon Islands
- Tonga
- Tuvalu
- Vanuatu

In regards to the companies, the ones who were present are as follows:

- Daiei
- Fujitsu
- Fuyo Group
- Hitachi
- IBM
- Japan Automobile Manufacturers Association
- Kodansha
- Matsushita
- Mitsubishi
- Mitsui
- NEC
- NTT
- Shueisha
- Sony
- Sumitomo Group
- Suntory
- TDK
- Toshiba
- UCC Ueshima Coffee Co.
- Japan Airlines

Also present were the United Nations, the European Economic Community, the Organisation for Economic Co-operation and Development (OECD) and the Asian Development Bank, along with the government of the Ibaraki prefecture.

=== Mascot ===
The mascot was Cosmo Hoshimaru was designed by a student in a design competition. and shows either an anthropomorphic planet with a ring or an alien astronaut with a flying saucer.

== See also ==
- Technocosmos (Ferris wheel that was built for the Expo '85)
- Japanil Kalyanaraman (Indian Tamil film that was filmed on location)
