= Oran Exposition =

1930 French colonial exposition in Oran, Algeria

Overview
- BIE-class: Unrecognized exposition
- Name: Oran Exposition

Location
- Country: French Algeria
- City: Oran
- Coordinates: 35.689°N 0.645°E

Timeline
- Opening: 1 January 1930
- Closure: 30 June 1930

The Oran Exposition was a French colonial exposition held in Oran, Algeria in 1930 to help celebrate the 100th anniversary of French control over Algeria.
