= Sierra Leone Exhibition =

Overview
- BIE-class: Unrecognized exposition
- Name: Sierra Leone Exhibition
- Organized by: J. T. Comissiong

Participant(s)
- Countries: 8

Location
- Country: Sierra Leone Colony and Protectorate
- City: Freetown

Timeline
- Opening: February 28, 1865
- Closure: April 22, 1865

The Sierra Leone Exhibition was an event held in Freetown in 1865 to promote the agriculture of countries in that region and their colonial overseers.

== History ==
=== Background ===
In 1863, the R. W. Hartshorn was discussing the topic of agriculture in the Colony of Sierra Leone with a group of men that had created the Young Men's Institute. These discussions then led to the suggestion of an exhibition to be held in Sierra Leone. On December 18, 1863, a dozen men in Freetown met to discuss the possibility of holding an exhibition of African products in the colony.

An executive committee was created on January 5, 1864 under the leadership of the J. T. Comissiong. On March 26, a public meeting was held to discuss the proposed exhibition to the mechanics and farmers of the colony. The colonial government granted £250 and another £427 2s. 6d. was raised from private individuals in the colony.

The first major problem of the organising committee was in finding a suitable building for the exhibition. Not having the funds to build a new exhibition building, the committee found it suitable to use the fruit and vegetable market building and the adjacent Court House connected by a temporary building for the exhibition.

=== Nations represented ===
The exhibits were divided into 4 sections which was then divided into 34 classes. There were 8 nations represented at the exhibition:

Africa

- Gambia, Gorée, Lagos, Liberia, Senegal, Sierra Leone

Europe

- France, Great Britain

=== Exhibition ===
The Exhibition was opened on February 28, 1865 by Governor Samuel Blackall. It closed on April 22, 1865. After open for 30 days, the exhibition saw an attendance of about 4,000. Admission of Tuesdays was 2s. 6d., on Wednesdays and Thursdays it was 1s., on Fridays it was 6d. and on Saturdays it was only 3d. The exhibition was closed on Sundays and Mondays. A season ticket cost 10s. 6d for men and 7s. 6d. for women. The total cost of the exhibition was £1,027 2s. 3d. and the total revenues amounted to £1,089 14s. 10½d. This left a profit of £62 12s. 7½d.
