= Expo 81 =

1981 exhibition in Plovdiv, Bulgaria

1981 Plovdiv

Overview
- BIE-class: Specialized exposition
- Name: Expo 81
- Motto: Hunting, fishing, and man in society
- Building(s): International Fair Plovdiv

Location
- Country: Bulgaria
- City: Plovdiv

Timeline
- Opening: June 14, 1981
- Closure: July 12, 1981

Specialized expositions
- Previous: Expo '75 in Okinawa
- Next: 1982 World's Fair in Knoxville

Universal
- Previous: Expo '70 in Osaka
- Next: Seville Expo '92 in Seville

The Plovdiv International Exhibition of 1981 was regulated by the Bureau International des Expositions and took place from June 14 to July 12, 1981, in Plovdiv, Bulgaria. The exhibition had an area of 51 hectares. The sample application was filed on June 12, 1980, registering the event as a specialized exposition.

The exhibition theme was "hunting, fishing and men in society." The goal was to present the environment through the exhibits of participating countries, the development of hunting in different parts of the world, showing the interaction between hunting, fishing and man in contemporary society and to contribute to maintaining and strengthening the culture of hunting

== See also ==
- List of world's fairs
