= Expo '75 =

World's Fair held on Japanese island of Okinawa

1975 Okinawa
- Logo

Overview
- BIE-class: Specialized exposition
- Name: Expo '75
- Motto: The sea we would like to see
- Building(s): Aquapolis
- Area: 101.17 hectares (250.0 acres)
- Visitors: 3,485,750

Participant(s)
- Countries: 33

Location
- Country: Japan
- City: Okinawa
- Coordinates: 26°41′30″N 127°52′30″E

Timeline
- Awarded: May 25, 1972
- Opening: July 20, 1975
- Closure: January 18, 1976

Specialized expositions
- Previous: Expo '74 in Spokane
- Next: Expo 81 in Plovdiv

Universal expositions
- Previous: Expo '70 in Osaka
- Next: Seville Expo '92 in Seville

Horticultural expositions
- Previous: Wiener Internationale Gartenschau 74 in Vienna
- Next: Floralies Internationales de Montréal in Montreal

Expo '75, also known as The Okinawa International Ocean Exposition (Japanese: 沖縄国際海洋博覧会, romanized: Okinawa kokusai kaiyou hakurankai), was a world's fair held on the Japanese island of Okinawa from July 20, 1975, to January 18, 1976.

== Background ==
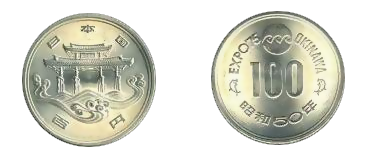
Japanese commemorative coin, 100 yen, issued in 1975. Shuri-mon, a historic site in Okinawa, is shown on the reverse.

Expo 75 was conceived, in part, to commemorate the American handover of Okinawa to Japan in 1972. The theme of the exposition was the oceans, and focused on oceanographic technologies, marine life, and oceanic cultures. The motto was “The sea we would like to see" (海－その望ましい未来, Umi - sono nozomashii mirai).

The event was located on the western end of the Motobu Peninsula, with a site area of 1,000,000 square metres (including sea areas). Thirty-seven nations participated, along with eight domestic and three international organizations. The keynote speaker on opening day was American author James A. Michener.

The exposition is the given reason for the construction of the Nakagusuku Hotel.

== Site ==
The site was divided into four “Clusters” in which there were pavilions and exhibits:

=== Fish Cluster ===
- Iran Pavilion
- Sumitomo Pavilion
- Aquarium
- Dolphin Land
- Expo Future Car (C.V.S.)

=== Peoples and History Cluster ===
- International Pavilion No. 1
- Okinawa Pavilion
- EXPO Hall
- Hitachi Pavilion
- Oceanic Culture Museum — Audio-visual hall, planetarium and exhibition hall displaying ships, carvings, and other cultural items from the Pacific Ocean area.
- Mitsubishi Pavilion — Ride featuring underwater technologies
- International Pavilion No. 2

=== Science and Technology Cluster ===
- World Ocean Systems (W.O.S) — Whale-shaped theater.
- Mistui Children’s Pavilion
- Fuyo Group Pavilion — Featuring oceanic robotics and aerial garden.
- U.S.A. Pavilion
- Aquapolis — Centerpiece floating city.
- Canada Pavilion
- Australia Pavilion
- Italy Pavilion
- U.S.S.R. Pavilion
- Expo New City Car (K.R.T.)

=== Ships Cluster ===
- International Pavilion No. 3
- Midori/Icearama Pavilion – Iceberg-shaped building displaying a 3,000-year-old ice core, and a 12,000-year-old ice core.
- EXPO Port
- Guest House

There was also EXPO Port, EXPO Beach, and an amusement park named EXPO Land.

== Highlights ==
The centerpiece of Expo 75 was the Aquapolis, a floating city designed by Japanese architect Kiyonori Kikutake. It was envisioned as a concept of how humans could live harmoniously on the ocean, and a prototype for marine communities. The Aquapolis was constructed at a shipyard in Hiroshima, Japan, and then towed to the Expo site. The facility was funded by the Japanese government, and cost 13 billion yen. It was thirty-two meters high, and had a one-hundred square meter deck. It was later sold for scrap in 2000.

The Expo Transit System featured two types of automated, electric transport vehicles: The "Expo New City Cars" (KRT) ran on a 3.7 km track almost the whole length of the site, there were three stations. The Expo Future Cars (CVS) track was at the north end and connected the Fish Cluster with Expo Land via five stations.

== Post-Exposition ==
After the Expo was over, the site became Okinawa Commemorative National Government Park (国営沖縄記念公園), also known as Ocean Expo Park. Most of the exhibits were removed, although the Aquapolis was retained as an attraction and eventually hosted four million visitors. As years passed, the number of visitors to the Aquapolis declined and it was closed in 1993. In October 2000, the Aquapolis was towed away to Shanghai to be scrapped.

The main tank of the aquarium facility that was opened at Expo was the largest indoor aquarium in the world at that time with a water volume of 1,100,000 litres (291,000 US gal). After that, the Aquarium facility used in Expo'75 continued to be used and was opened as the Okinawa Ocean Expo Aquarium. The Okinawa Ocean Expo Aquarium closed in 2002 due to aging and then reopened as Okinawa Churaumi Aquarium.

The Tropical & Subtropical Arboretum were later constructed on the site.
