= Wartberg (Stuttgart) =

Mountain in Baden-Württemberg, Germany

Coordinates: 48°48′14″N 9°10′38″E

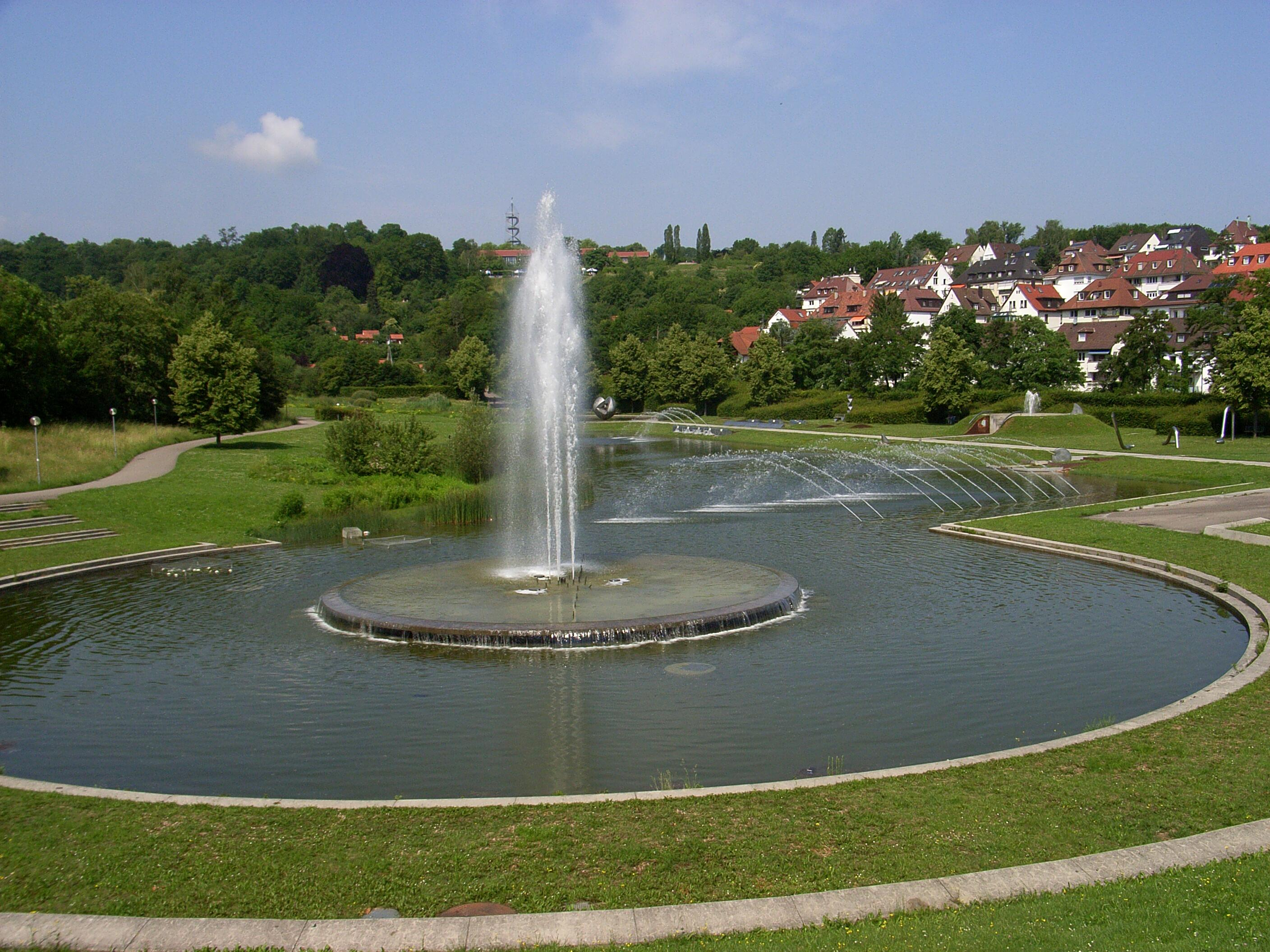
- Wartberg.

Geography
- Location: Baden-Württemberg, Germany

Wartberg (Stuttgart) is a low eminence in the city of Stuttgart in the German state of Baden-Württemberg.
