= 1865 International Exhibition =

World's fair in Porto, Portugal, in 1865

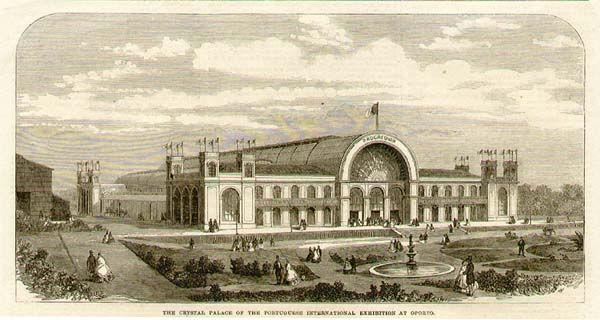
Wood-engraving, published in The Illustrated London News, of the Palácio de Cristal, which was constructed to house the Exhibition

The Exposição Internacional do Porto, known in English as the International Exhibition of 1865, was a world's fair held in the Portuguese city of Porto. The exhibition was housed inside the grand Palácio de Cristal, which was modelled on the synonymous Crystal Palace erected for The Great Exhibition held during 1851 in London. The building's designer was Anglo-Irish civil engineer Francis Webb Sheilds, who also engineered its construction – he had been the resident engineer for the earlier building between 1852 and 1858. The building was demolished in 1951 after hosting many other expositions.

== Background ==
The exhibition was inaugurated on 18 September 1865 in the presence of the Portuguese king, Luís I and his consort Maria Pia of Savoy. Upon inauguration, it became the first world's fair to occur on the Iberian Peninsula. The exhibition was shown until January 1866, and the theme of the event was industrial and trade innovations with an emphasis in primary materials, machinery, manufacture and fine arts.

== Organization ==
Chiefly organized by the Associação Industrial Portuense (today called the Associação Empresarial de Portugal), the exhibition hosted 3,139 exhibitors, of which 499 were French, 265 German, 107 British, 89 Belgian, 62 Brazilian, 24 Spanish, and 16 Danish. Russia, the Netherlands, Turkey, the United States and Japan were also represented.
