= Colombo '92 =

1992 cultural event in Italy

Coordinates: 44.4103°N 8.9264°E

1992 Genoa
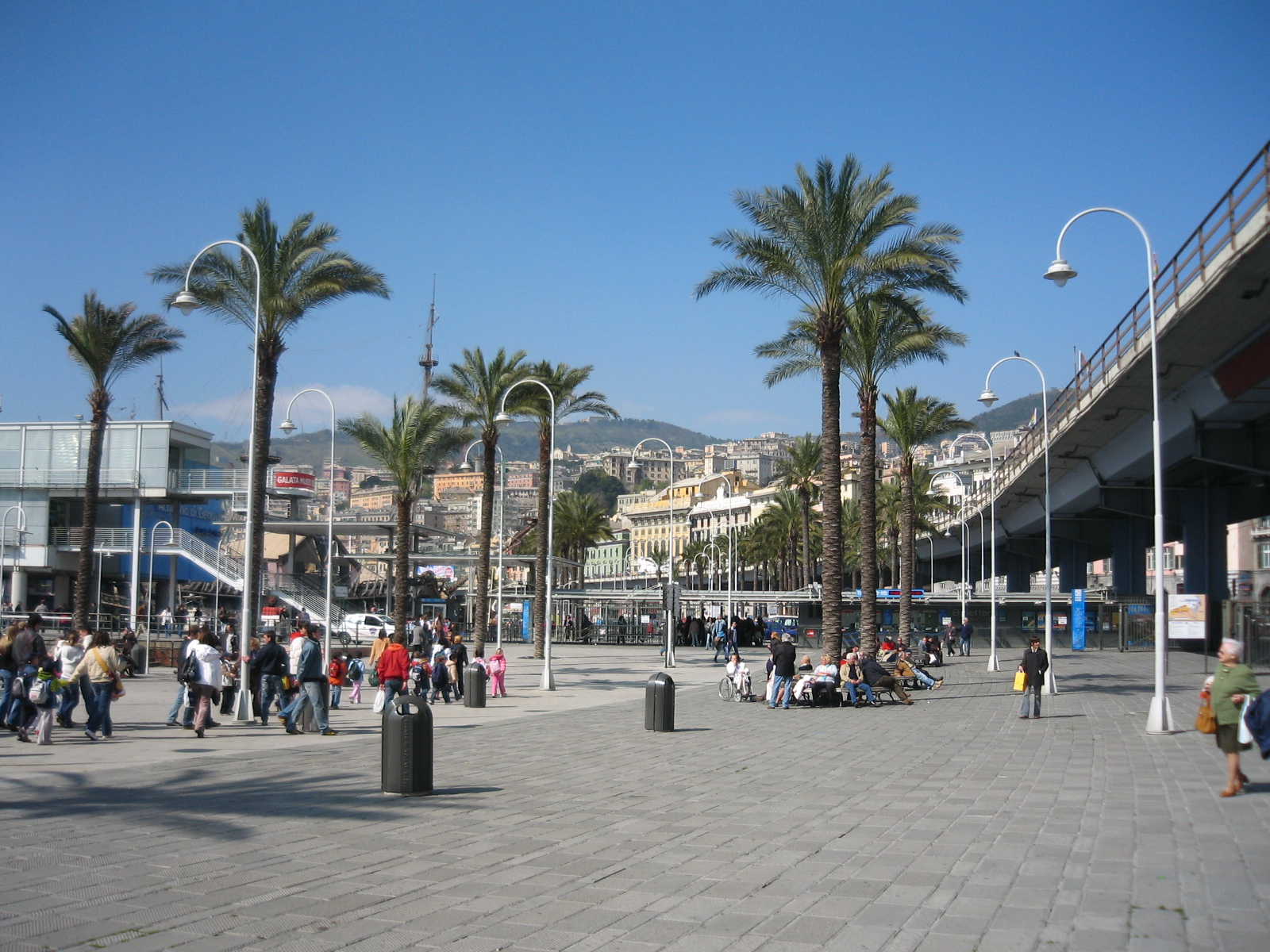

Overview
- BIE-class: Specialized exposition
- Name: Christopher Columbus, The Ship and the Sea
- Area: 6 hectares
- Visitors: 694,800
- Mascot: Gatto Cristoforo

Participant(s)
- Countries: 54

Location
- Country: Italy
- City: Genoa
- Venue: Porto Antico

Timeline
- Opening: 15 May 1992
- Closure: 15 August 1992

Specialized expositions
- Previous: Expo 91 in Plovdiv
- Next: Taejŏn Expo '93 in Daejon

Universal
- Previous: Expo '70 in Osaka
- Next: Expo 2000 in Hanover

Simultaneous
- Universal: Seville Expo '92
- Horticultural (AIPH): Floriade 1992

L'Esposizione Internazionale Specializzata Genova '92 - Colombo '92 (in English International Exhibition Genoa '92 - Colombo '92) or more informally Expo 1992, was held in Genoa, Italy, from 15 May to 15 August 1992. The theme was "Christopher Columbus, The Ship and the Sea", and the Expo was timed to celebrate the 500 years since the discovery of America by the Genoese sailor Christopher Columbus. Because of the theme, the expo was also known as Colombiadi. It was a specialized Exhibition with 54 countries represented. Total visitors were 694,800. The exposition ran at the same time as the larger and longer duration Seville Expo '92, a Universal Exposition, held in the city from whose port (on the Guadalquivir) Columbus had sailed in 1492. The expo's logo was a "500" number with Genoa's flag; the mascot was a cat dressed like Christopher Columbus called "Gatto Cristoforo".

== Exposition ==
The International Exposition of Genoa '92 was held at the Porto Antico and allowed the entire redesign of the area, designed by the architect Renzo Piano. The aquarium hosted the sea's pavilion and the ship "Italia" hosted the ship's pavilion. Other important places were "Piazza delle Feste", a covered square, the "Magazzini del Cotone" an old port structure that now hosts the conference center, "Porta Siberia" a historical port's fortress and the "Palazzina Millo".

== Participants ==
54 countries attended the event officially (three unofficially) and, initially, it was announced that the Expo reached about 1.7 million visitors, of 3,000,000 provided, but the count was later revised in only about 800,000 visitors. In the fall of 1992, it was discovered that the actual visitors were less than what was announced at first and that the Ente Colombo, who ran the event, had collected only 13 billion compared to 45 billion planned. Because of the false news circulated and the lack of success of the event, the Mayor Romano Merlo, who was also president of Colombo, resigned and was replaced by Deputy Mayor Claudio Burlando.

The guest of honor was the Government of the Bahamas, where Christopher Columbus first landed in the Americas on the island of Guanahani. Sculptures called "Obelisk" by Alessandro Matta and "Dolphin" by Bruno Elisei were displayed in the Bahamian hall, in homage to Columbus.

Participating Countries
Asia
China	South Korea	Japan	Israel
Africa
Cameroon	Egypt	Morocco	Senegal
Tunisia
Europe
Bulgaria	CIS	Croatia	France
Germany	Greece	Hungary	Czech Republic
Denmark	France	Italy	Malta
Monaco	Poland	Portugal	Romania
Spain	Switzerland	Vatican City
Americas
Argentina	Bahamas	Bolivia	Brazil
Chile	Colombia	Costa Rica	Cuba
Dominica	El Salvador	Ecuador	Guatemala
Haiti	Honduras	Mexico	Nicaragua
Panama	Paraguay	Peru	Uruguay
United States	Venezuela
Organizations
European Union
