= Yaba-chō, Nagoya =

Neighbourhood in Japan

Coordinates: 35°09′50″N 136°54′33″E

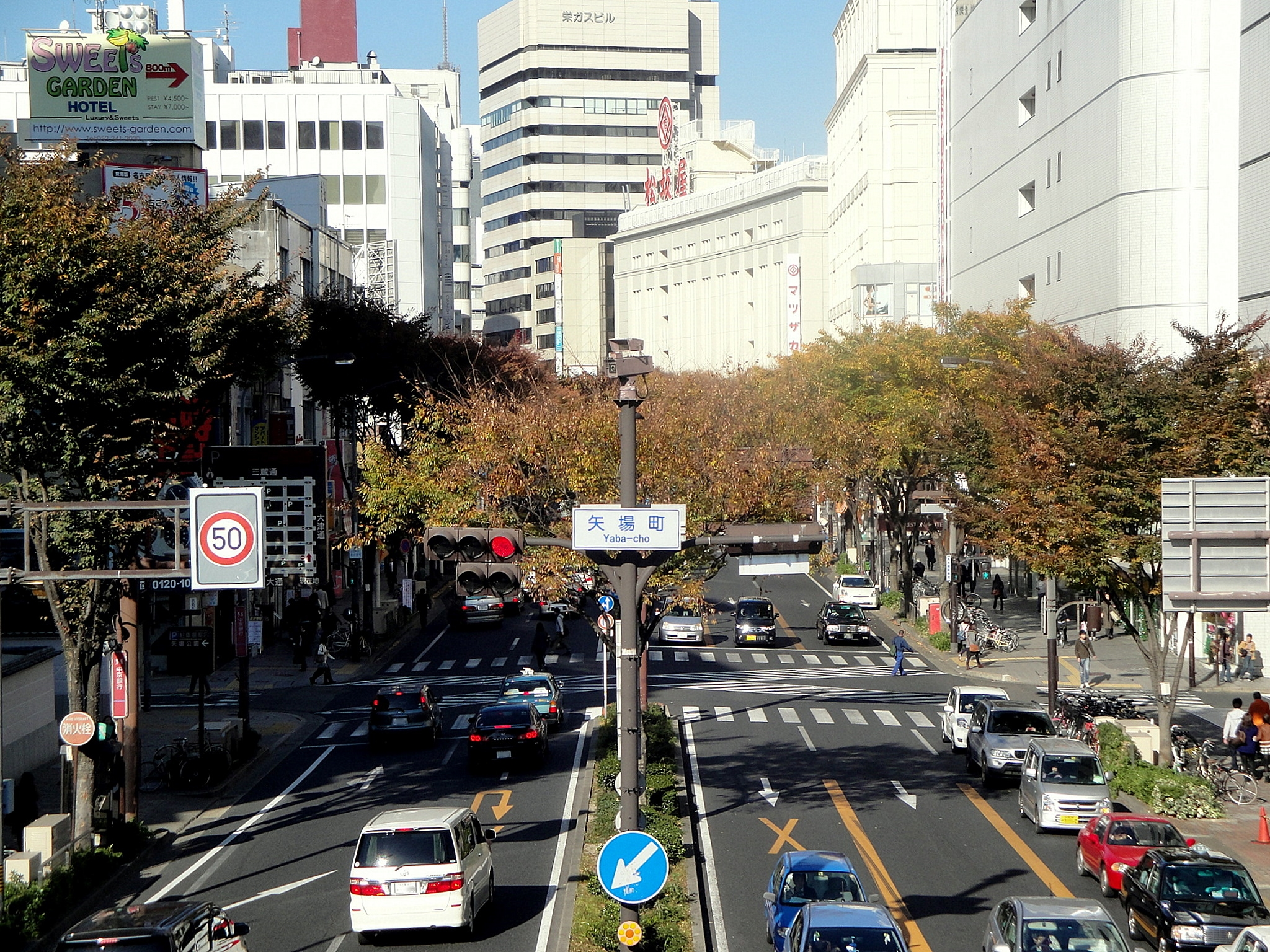
Yaba-chō in central Nagoya

Yaba-chō (矢場町) is a historic neighbourhood located in the Naka ward of Nagoya.

It is located next to Sakae. It is served by the Yabachō Station of the Meijo line.
