= International Design Centre Nagoya =

Museum in Japan

Coordinates: 35°9′55.7″N 136°54′18.9″E

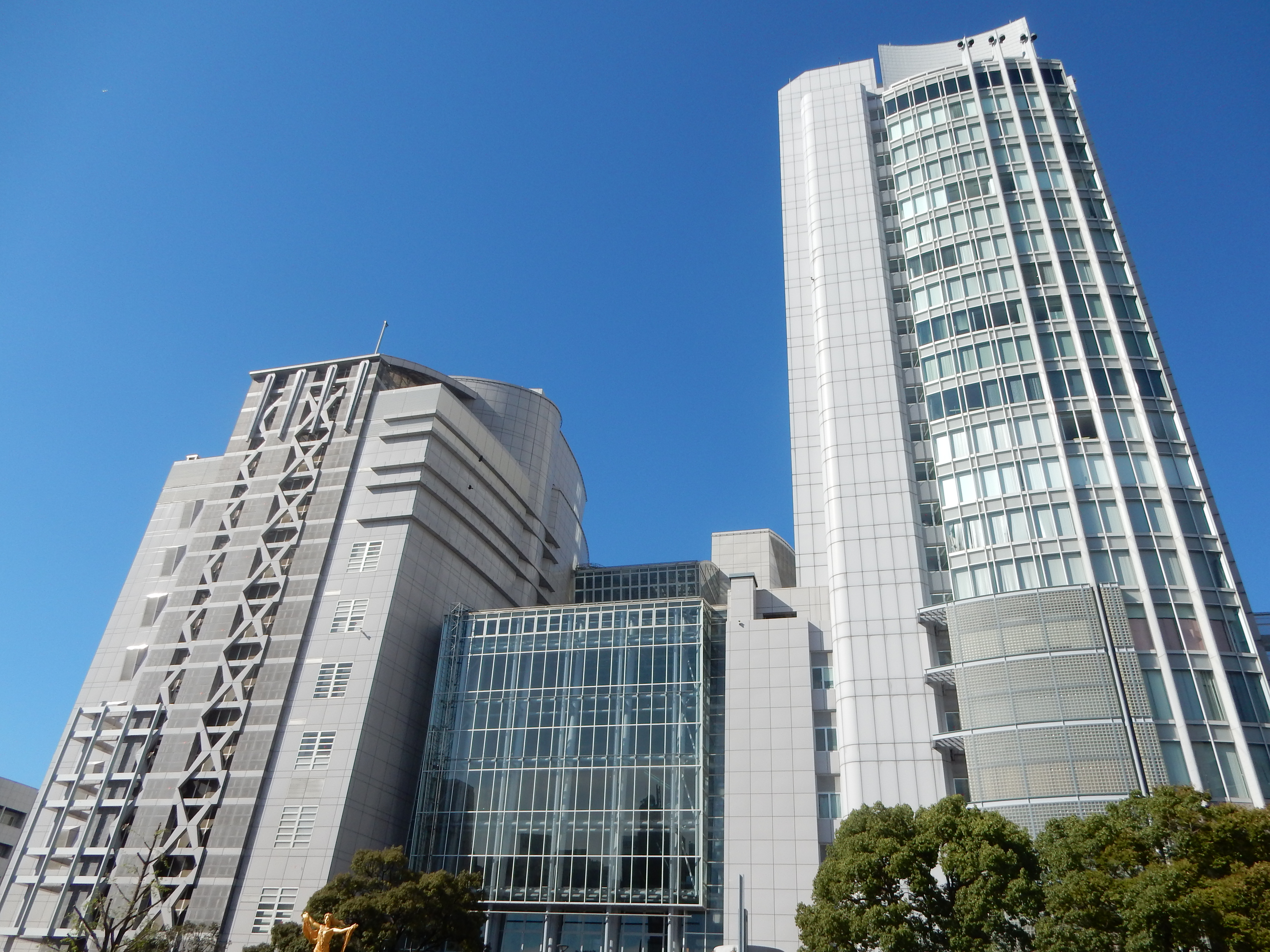
International Design Centre (left) at Nadya Park, Nagoya

The International Design Center NAGOYA and Design Museum (国際デザインセンター, Kokusai Dezain Sentā), abbreviated as IdcN, is a museum and exhibition hall located in Sakae, Nagoya, central Japan.

== History ==
The World Design Exhibition 1989 was held in Nagoya. The museum was established in 1992 and opened in 1996 in the Nadya Park skyscraper. Exhibited are leading designers and artists of conceptualisation, form and function. The pieces range from the Art Deco to the present. Works by Isamu Noguchi and Arne Jacobsen are included, as well as product design icons such as the Mini Cooper.

The Loft department store for shoppers interested in design is also located in Nadya Park.

Access by public transport is Yabachō Station on the Meijō Line.
