= Ishida-ryū =

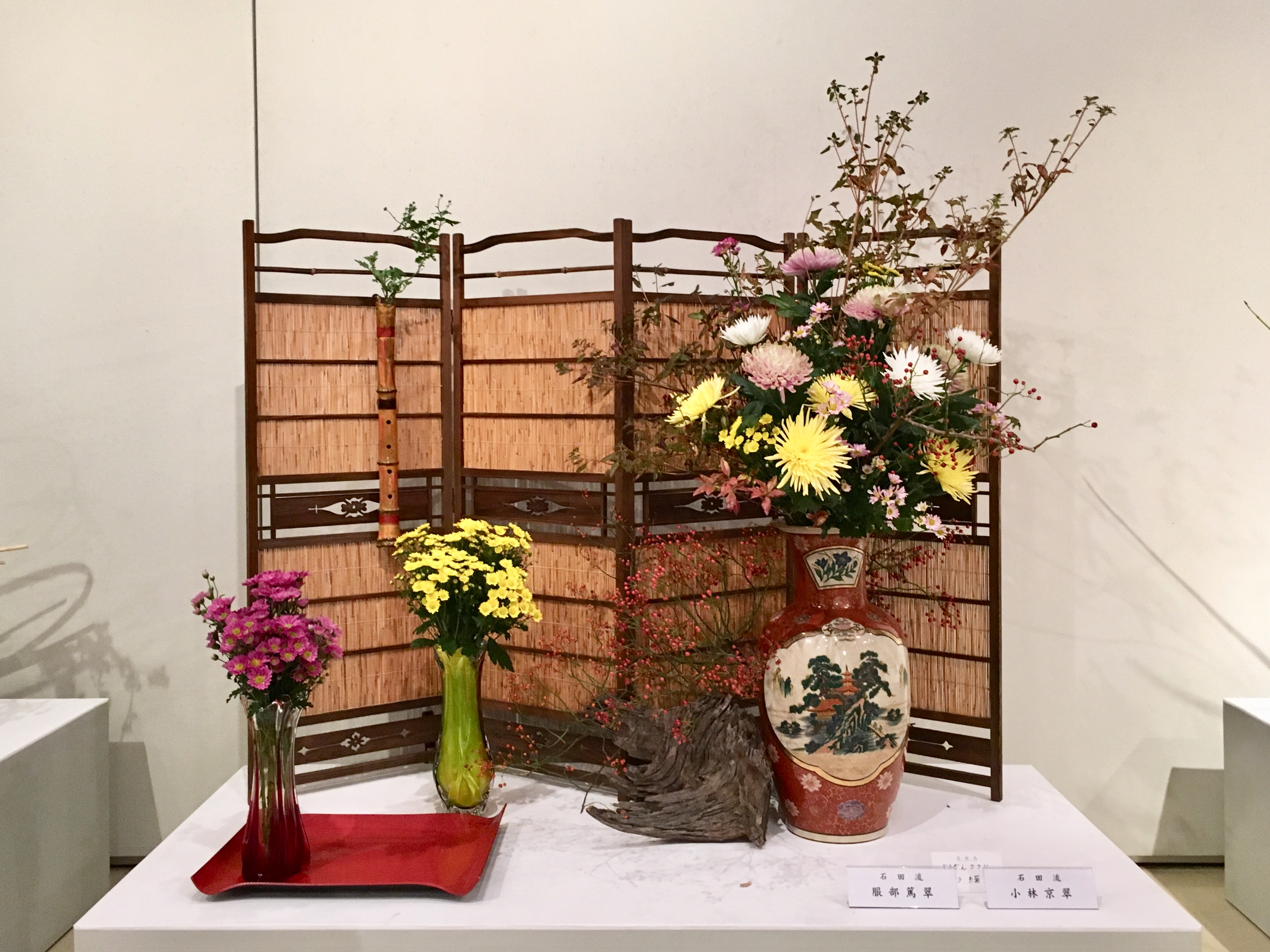
Flower arrangement by the Ishida-ryū, exhibited in Sakae (2018)

Ishida-ryū (石田流) is a school of Ikebana, or Japanese floral art.

== History ==
It was established in 1922 in Nagoya.

The organisation is currently headed by the second-generation headmaster Ishida Shyūsui (二代家元 石田秀翠).
