= Oriental Nakamura =

Japanese department store

Oriental Nakamura (オリエンタル中村百貨店, Orientaru Nakamura Hyakkaten) was a Japanese department store in Sakae, Nagoya, central Japan.

== History ==
The history goes back to the year 1869 (Meiji 2）when the Nakamura a dry goods store was founded on the corner of Honmachi street in Nagoya. Today the Bank of Tokyo-Mitsubishi is located there. After World War II, the company moved to a newly built department store on February 16, 1954, and was renamed Oriental Nakamura.

Along with Matsuzakaya, Maruei, and Meitetsu, Oriental Nakamura was one of the four major department stores of Nagoya.

The flagship store installed a rooftop Ferris wheel. The artist Tarō Okamoto was commissioned to install a large mural on the main facade of the flagship store. A new design for shopping bags and packaging was also introduced. In 1974 a new store in Hoshigaoka was opened. In 1977 however, Tokyo-based Mitsukoshi bought the Nakamura group and renamed the stores in 1980, which effectively meant the end of the name.

In front of the entrance to the flagship store, a modern sculpture of a kangaroo was placed, which quickly became a favourite meeting-spot. The large mural by Taro Okamoto was demolished after Mitsukoshi bought the store. The Ferris wheel however still exists. It is the oldest extant commercially running Ferris wheel in Japan and was registered in 2005 as a tangible cultural property.
