= Ginza Six =

- ギンザシックス
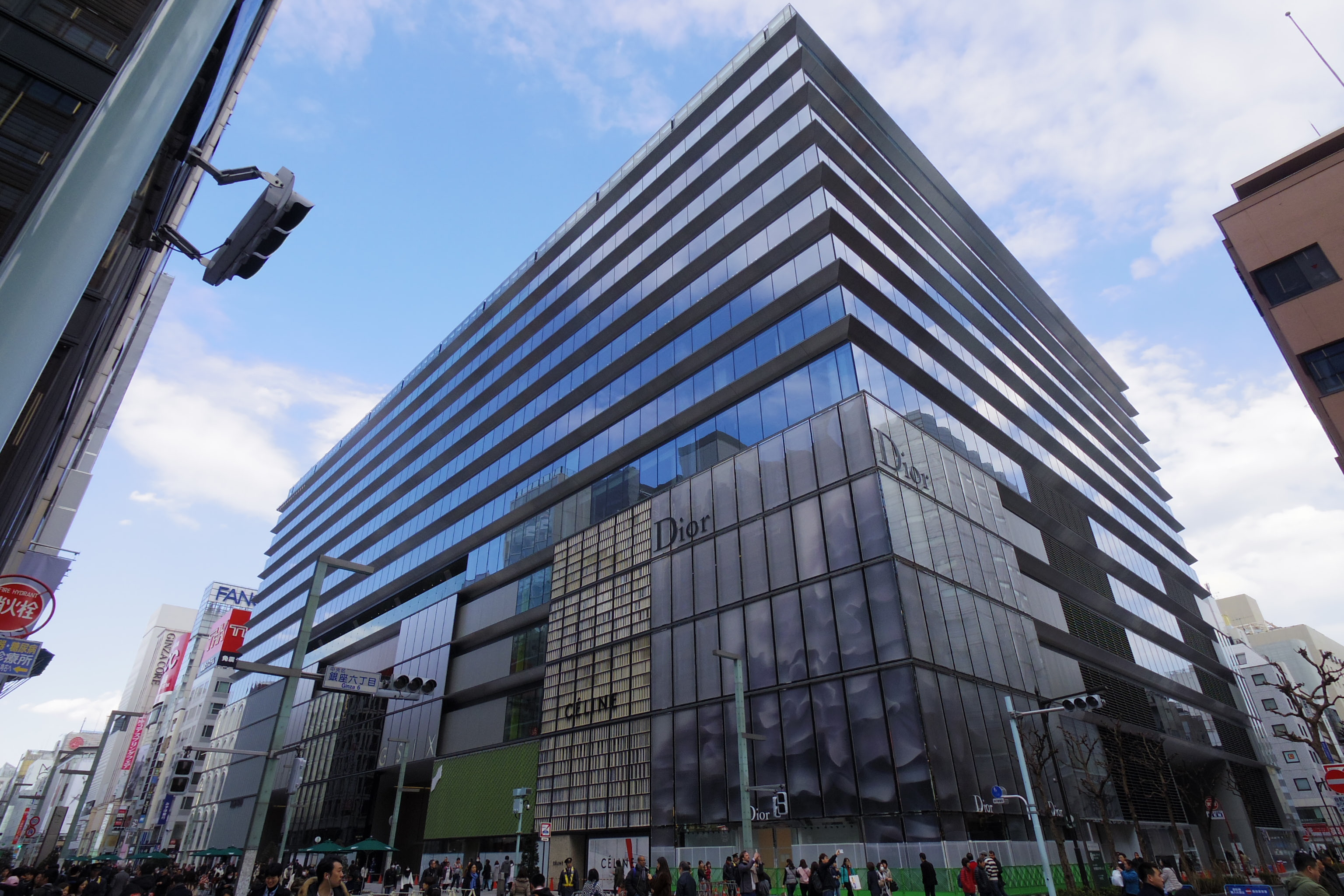
- Chuō-dori frontage

General information
- Status: Open, in use
- Type: Retail/Office building
- Architectural style: Postmodern
- Location: 6-10-1 Ginza, Chuo-ku, Tokyo, Japan
- Coordinates: 35°40′10.45″N 139°45′50.69″E
- Opened: 20 April 2017; 9 years ago
- Inaugurated: 17 April 2017
- Owner: Ginza Six Retail Management Co. Ltd.

Height
- Height: 56 m (184 ft)

Technical details
- Structural system: Steel frame, reinforced concrete, steel reinforced concrete
- Floor count: 18
- Floor area: 148,700 square metres (1,601,000 sq ft)

Design and construction
- Architect: Yoshio Taniguchi
- Other designers: Gwenael Nicolas, Kenya Hara
- Main contractor: Kajima

Website
- ginza6.tokyo

Ginza Six is a luxury shopping complex located in the Ginza area of Tokyo, jointly developed by Mori Building Company, J. Front Retailing, Sumitomo Corporation and L Catterton Real Estate. The name Ginza Six or G Six reflects the building address in Ginza 6-chome as well as the desire to provide an exceptional "six-star" shopping experience.

== History ==
Ginza Six was built on the location of the former Matsuzakaya department store, which was Ginza's first ever department store. The complex was inaugurated on 17 April, 2017, in a ceremony attended by Prime Minister of Japan Shinzo Abe, Governor of Tokyo Yuriko Koike, Chairman of LVMH Bernard Arnault, and President of J. Front Retailing Ryoichi Yamamoto, among others. It is the largest retail space in Ginza.

=== Incidents ===
On May 25, 2026, tear gas was reportedly used at the lobby of Sumitomo Mitsui Banking Corporation, affecting 25 persons with reports of severe headaches, sore throats, and coughing.

== Architecture ==
The building has space for up to 241 stores, including flagship facilities for Fendi, Kenzo, Vivienne Westwood, Alexander McQueen, Yves Saint Laurent and Van Cleef & Arpels. It also contains six floors of office space (floors 7—12), 24 restaurants and cafes, a banquet hall, a 480-seater Noh theater and a 4,000 square-meter rooftop garden. A terminal for tourist buses, a tourist information center, currency exchanges and duty exemption services cater to tourists.

Ginza Six has an art program run by Fumio Nanjo of the Mori Art Museum. The complex focuses on contemporary Japanese art, in an attempt to "sp[eak] to the creativity associated with modern-day Japan rather than the traditional Japanese aesthetic." The Central atrium artworks are a symbol of GINZA SIX and the inaugural exhibits included works by Yayoi Kusama and Patrick Blanc, among others.

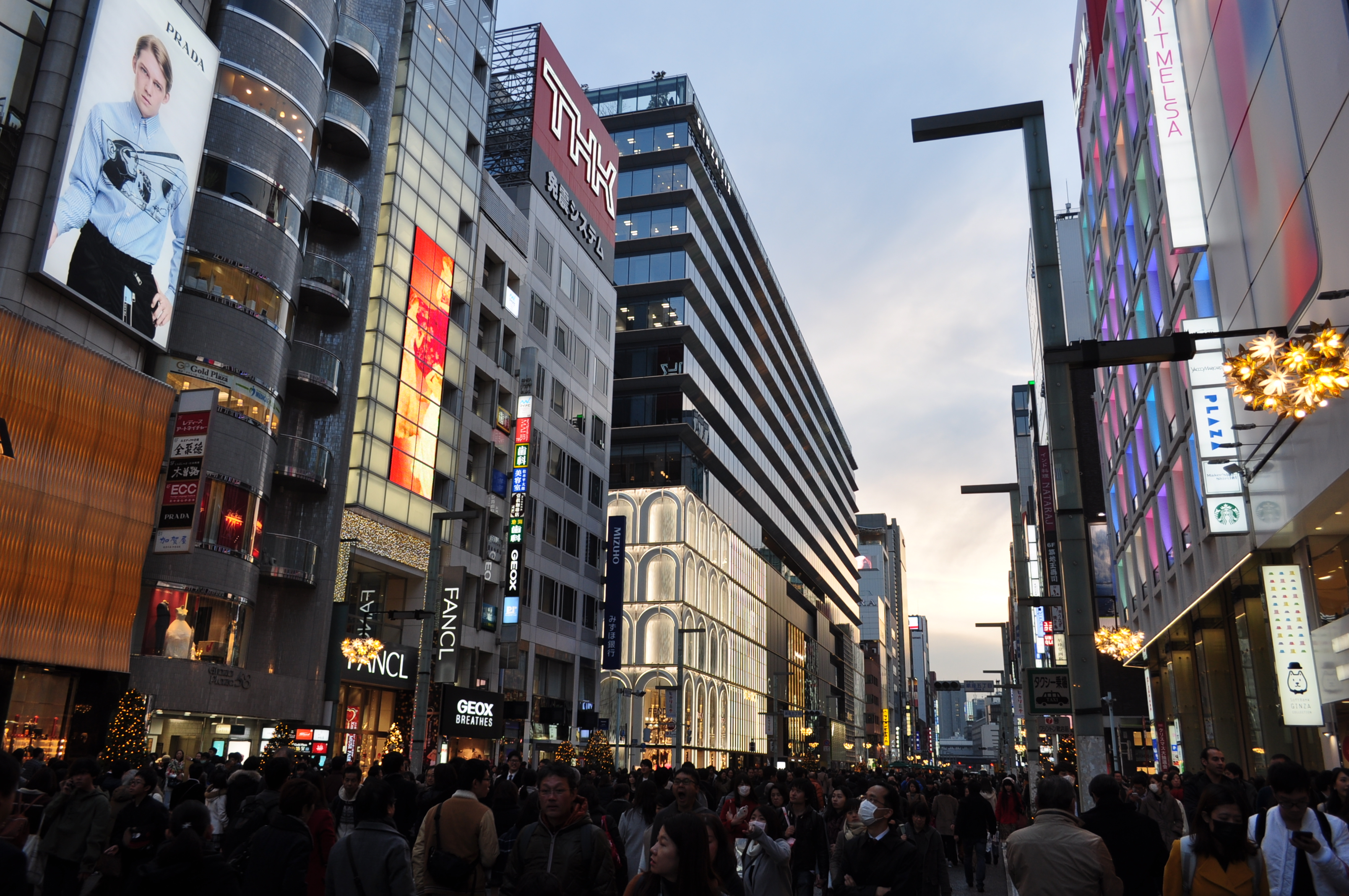
View of Ginza 6 with other buildings

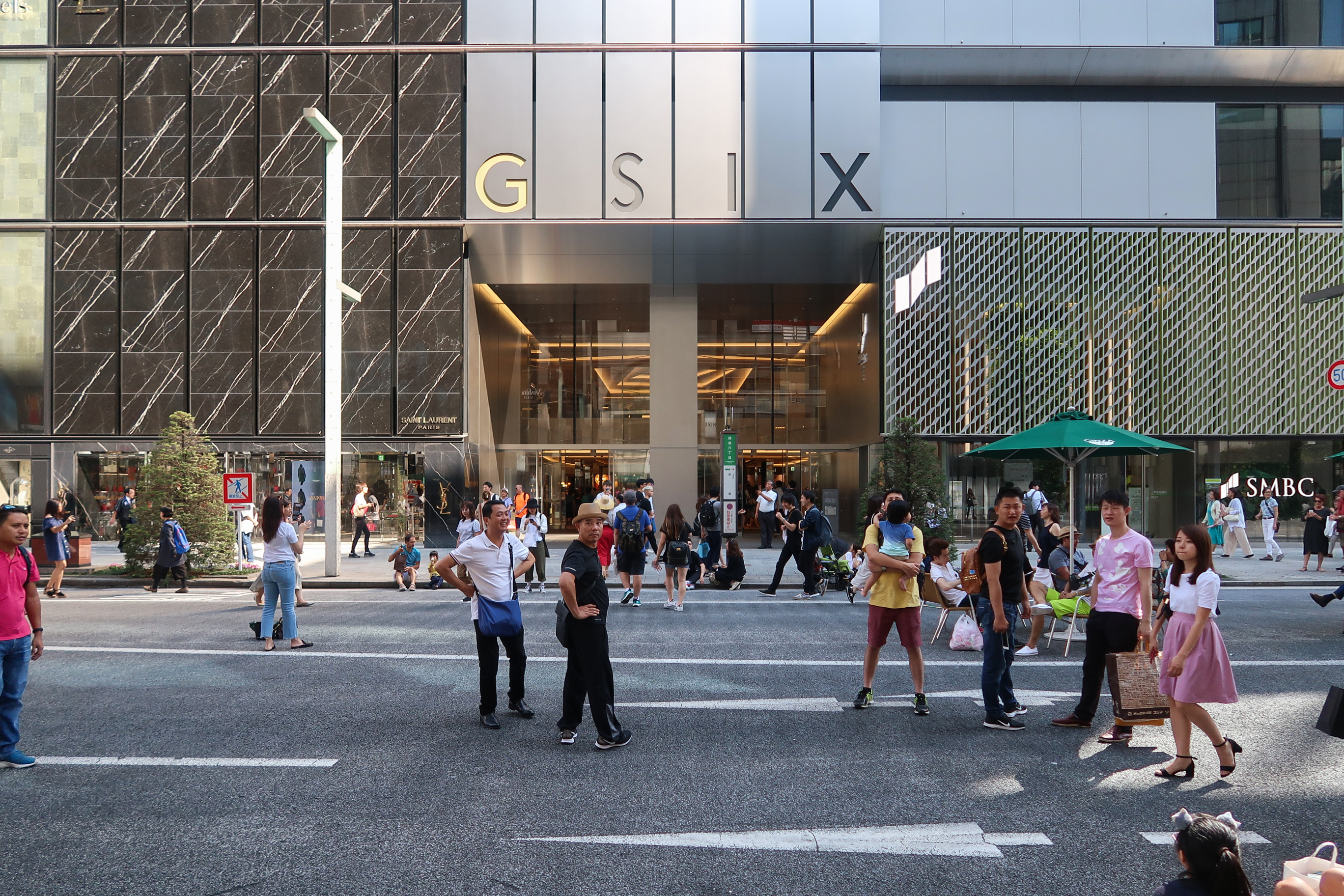
Ground floor entrance

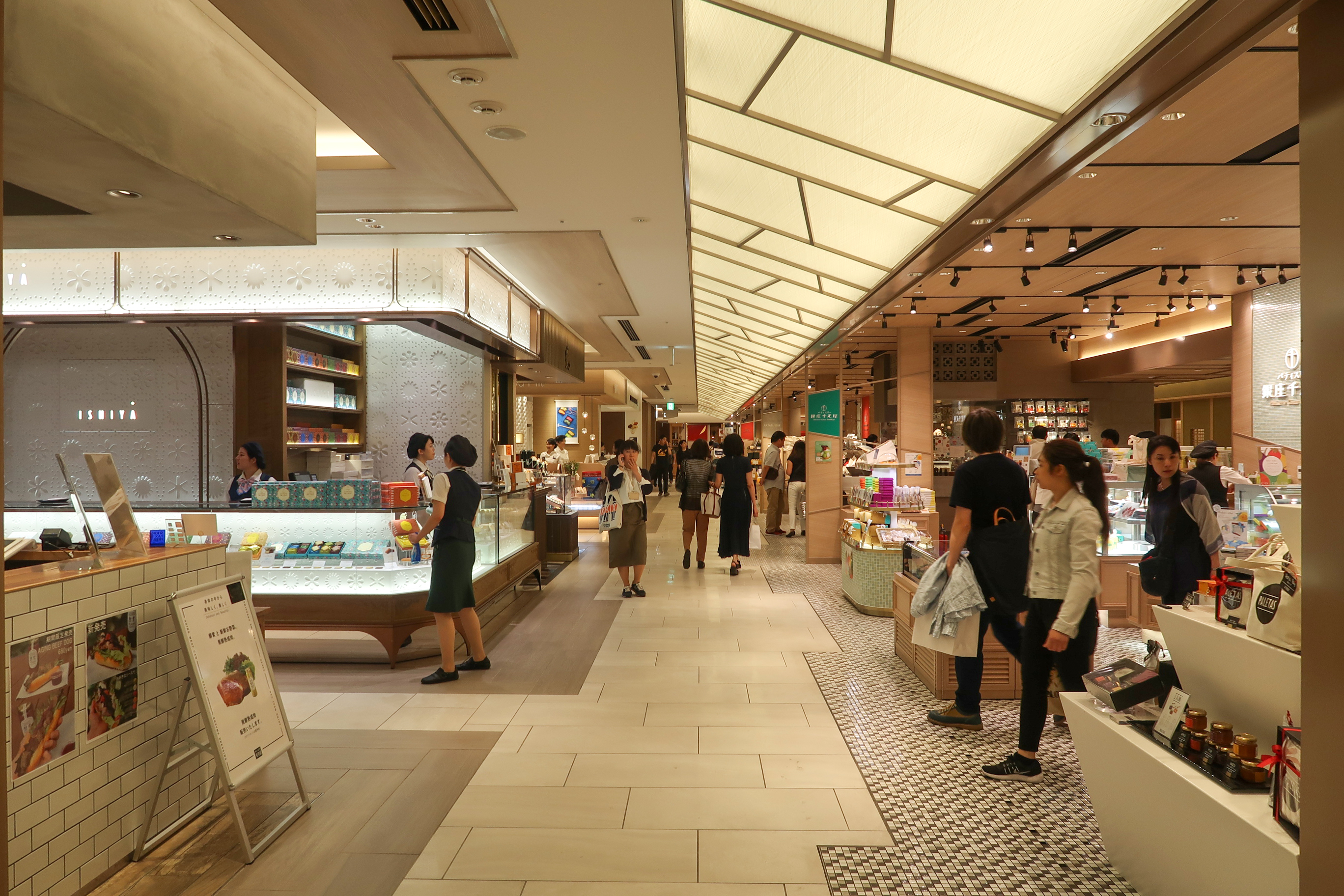
Basement Level 2

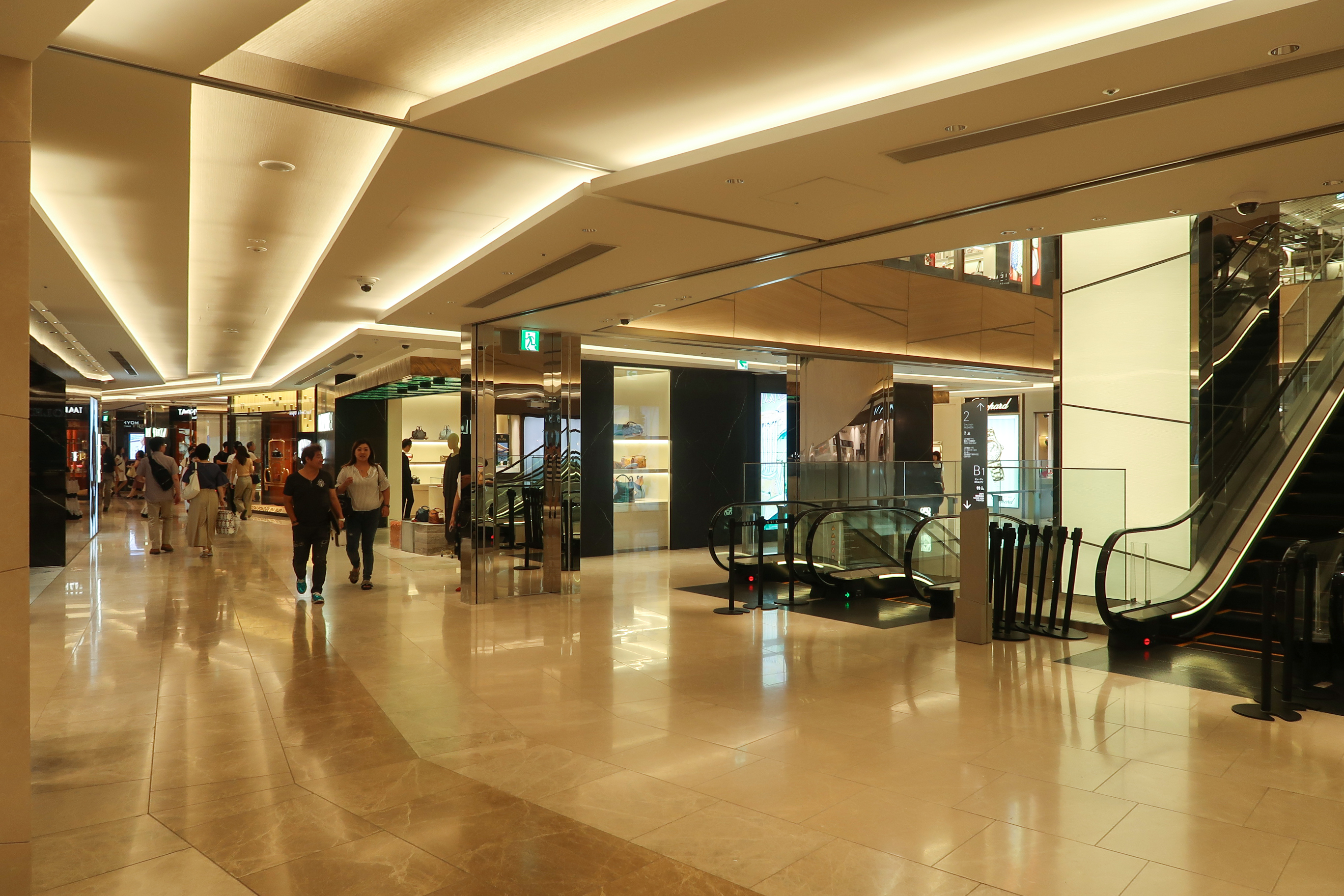
Basement Level 1

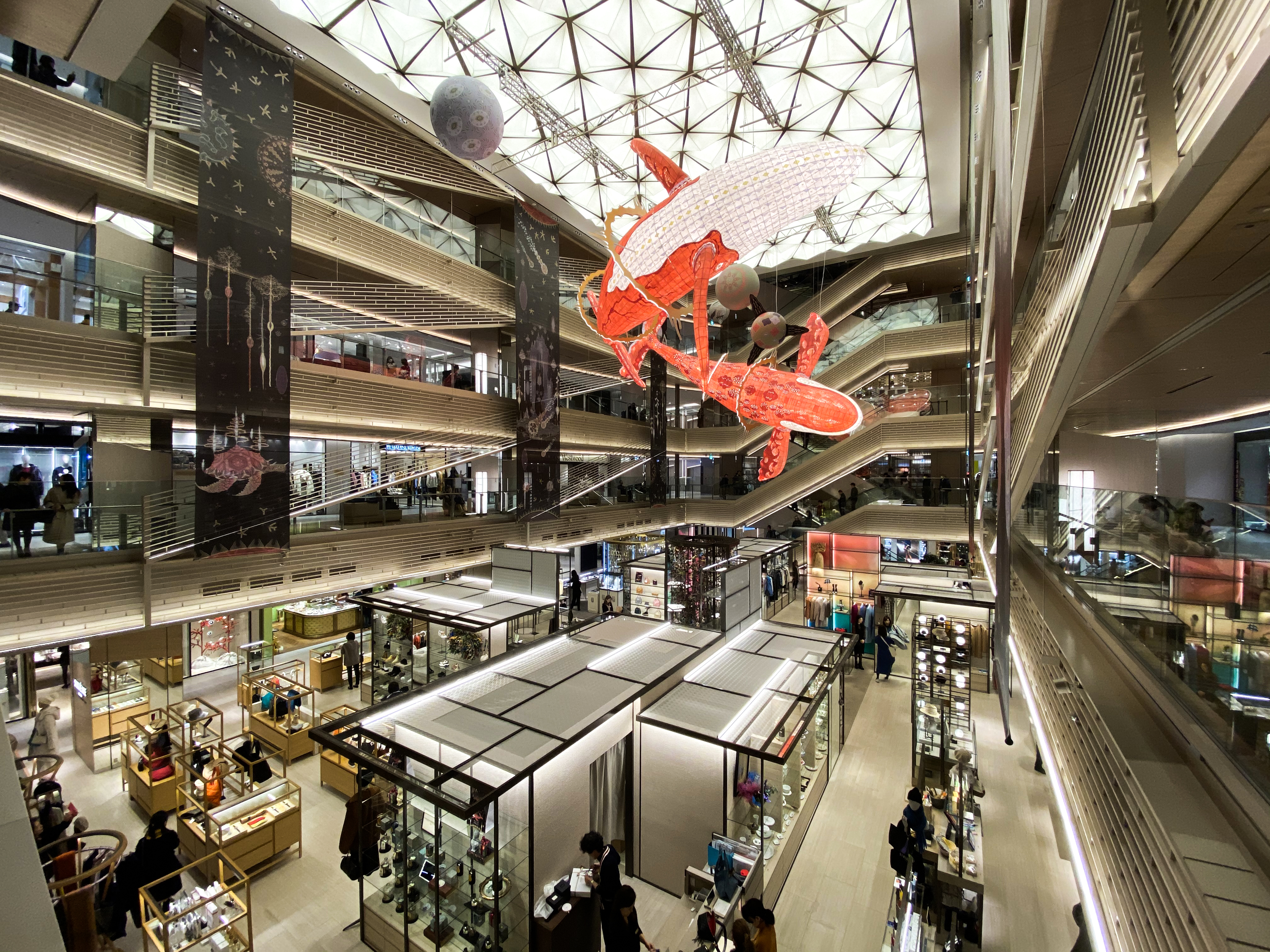
Central atrium

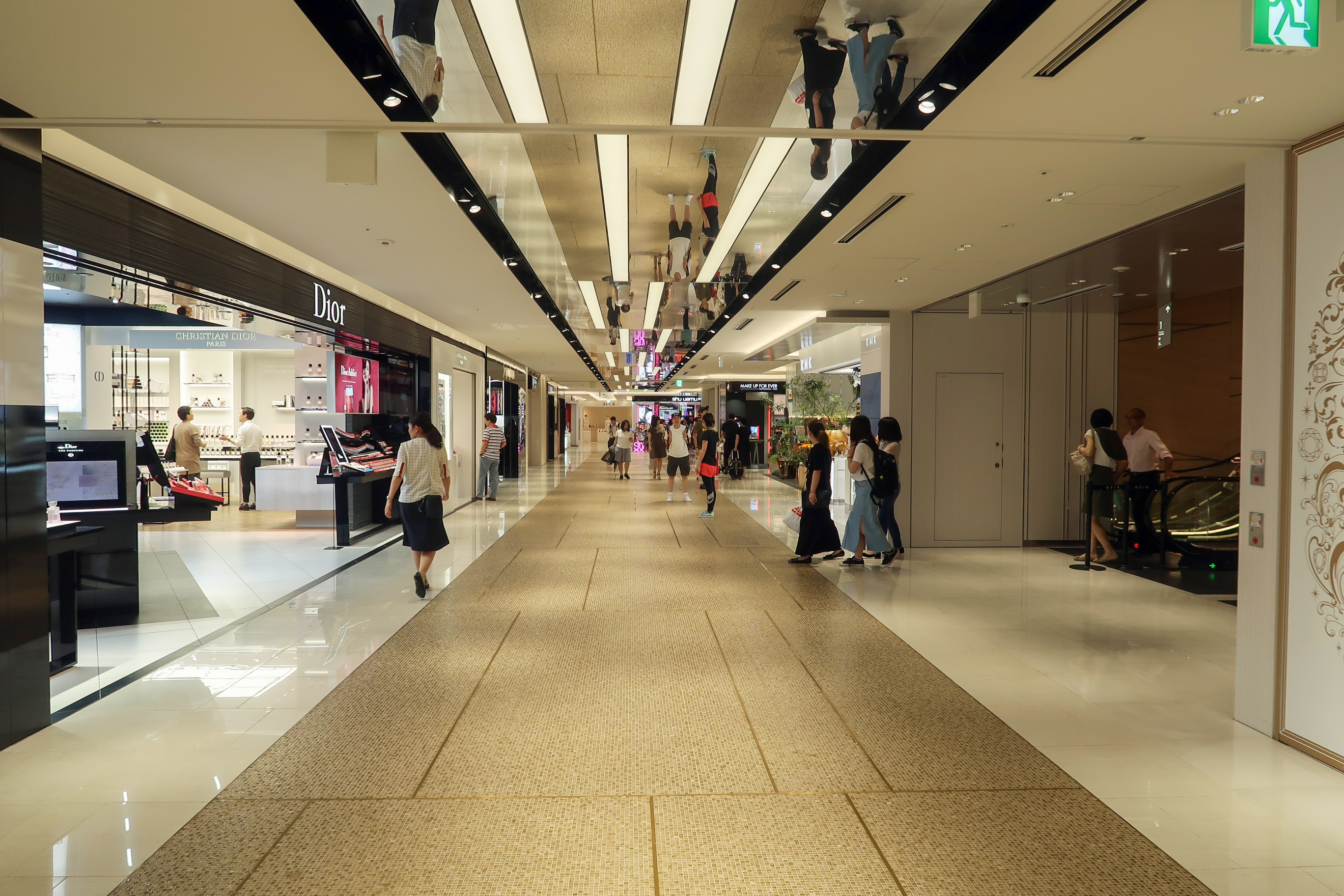
Level 1

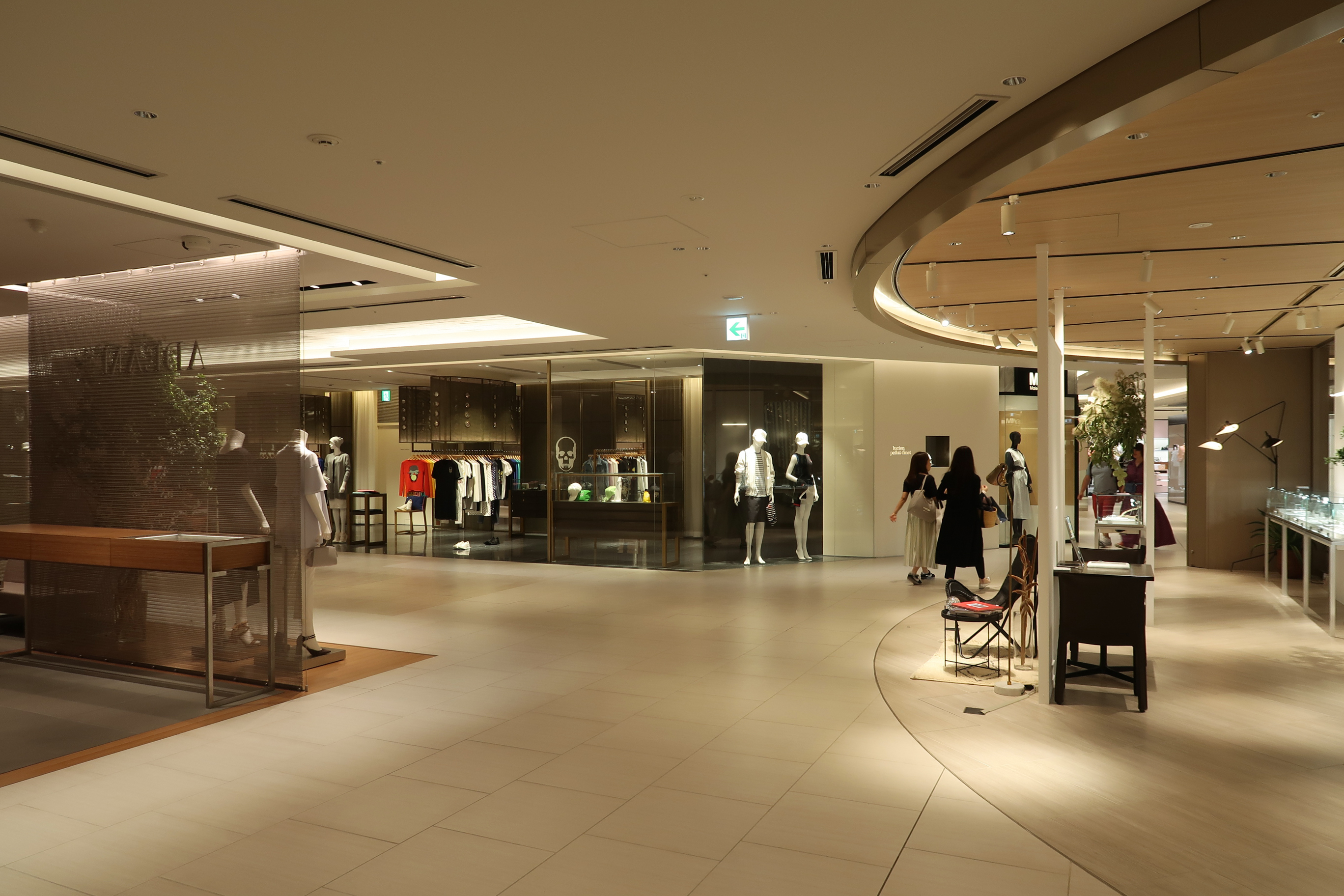
Level 3

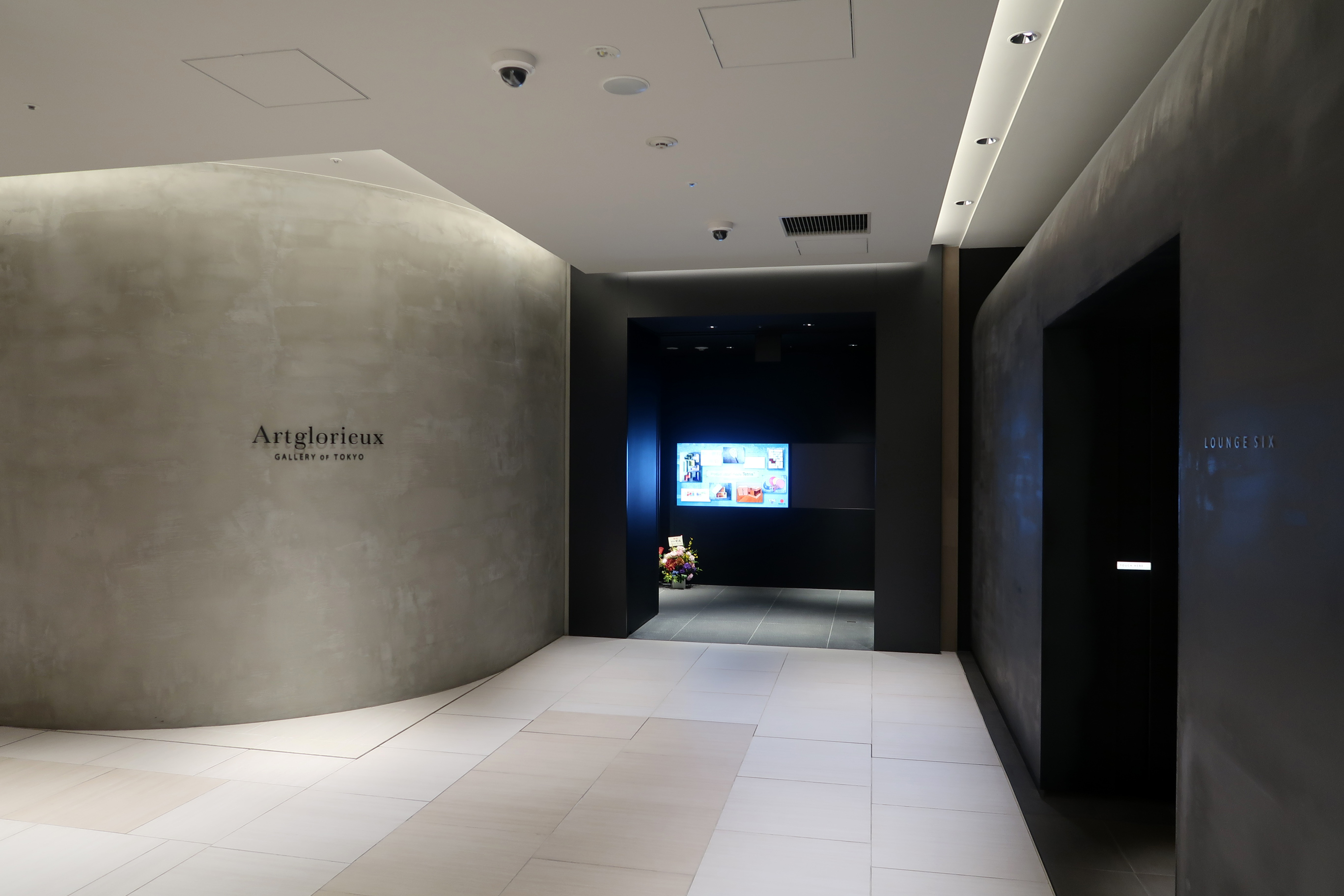
Artglorieux Gallery, Level 5

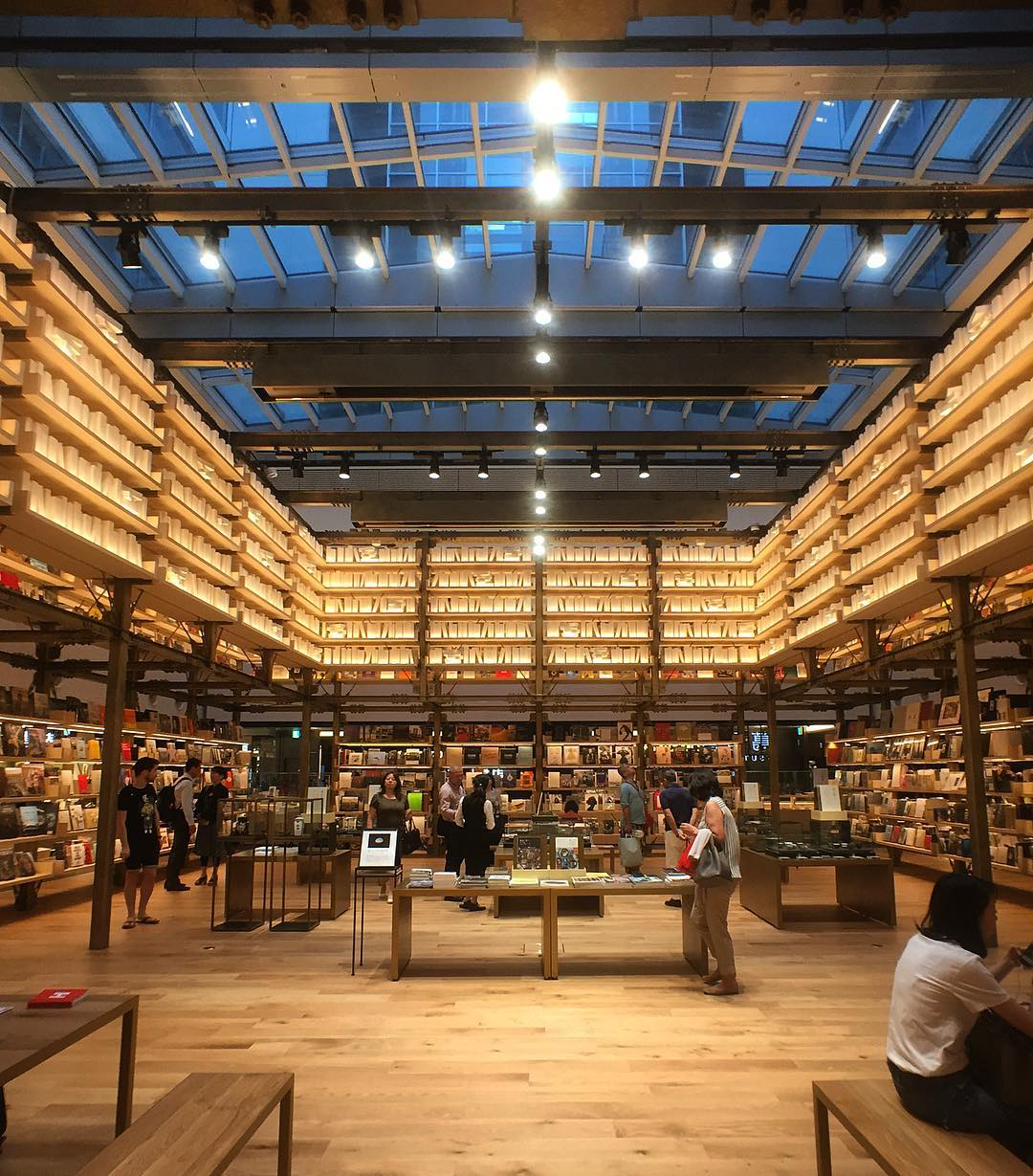
Tsutaya Books, Level 6

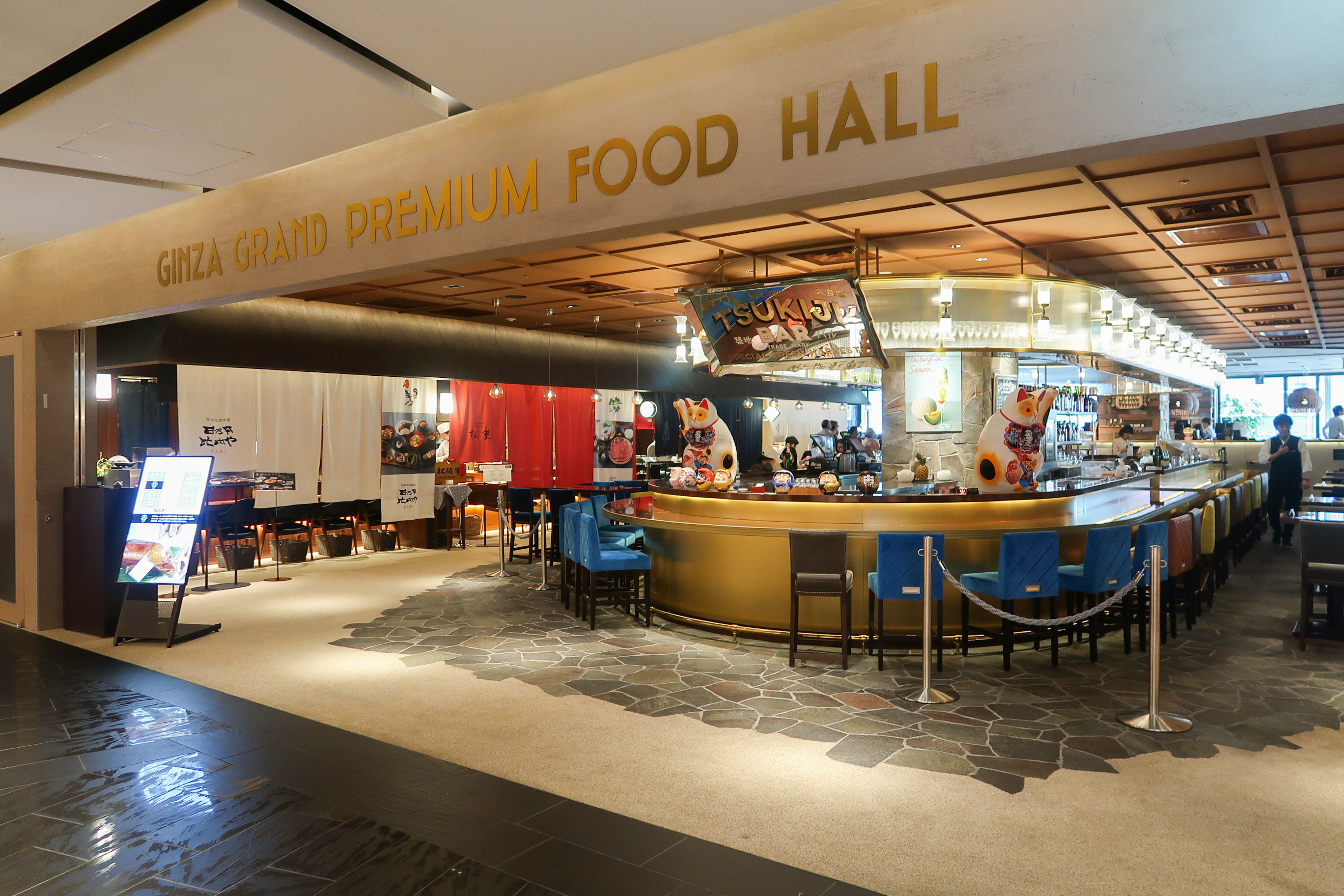
Food Hall, Level 6

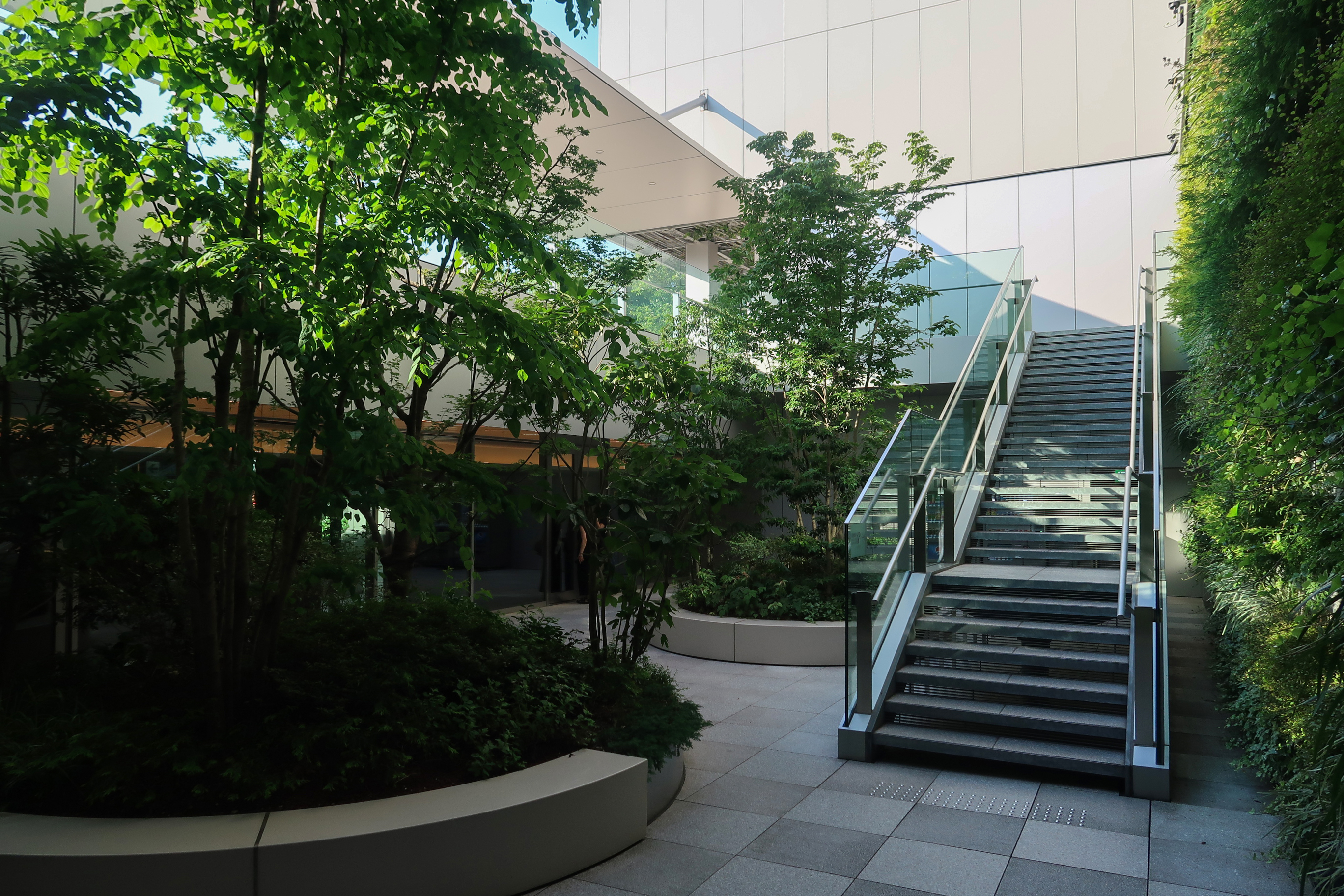
Stairs to the roof garden, Level 13

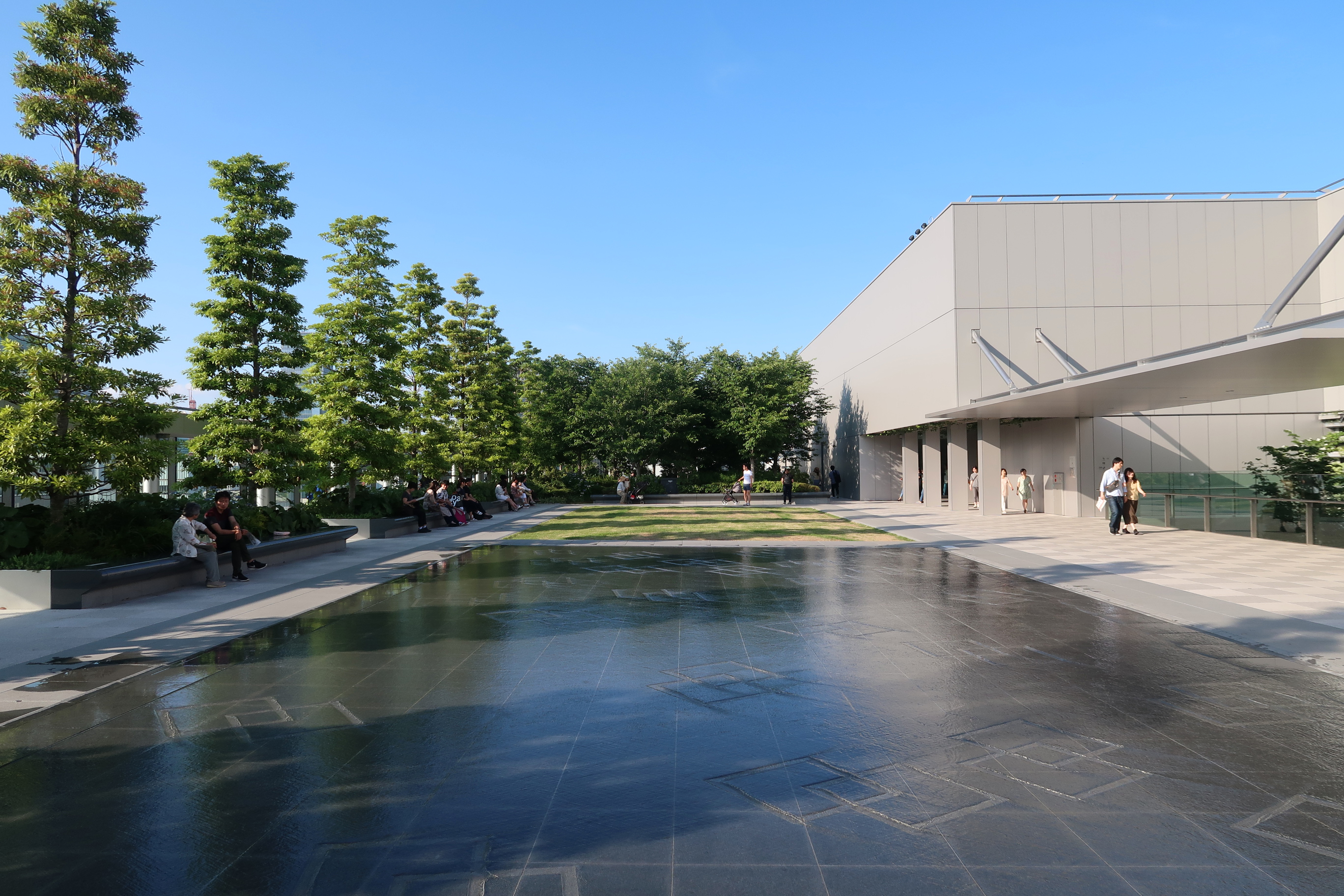
Roof Garden
