= World Design Exhibition 1989 =

International design event at Nagoya Congress Center

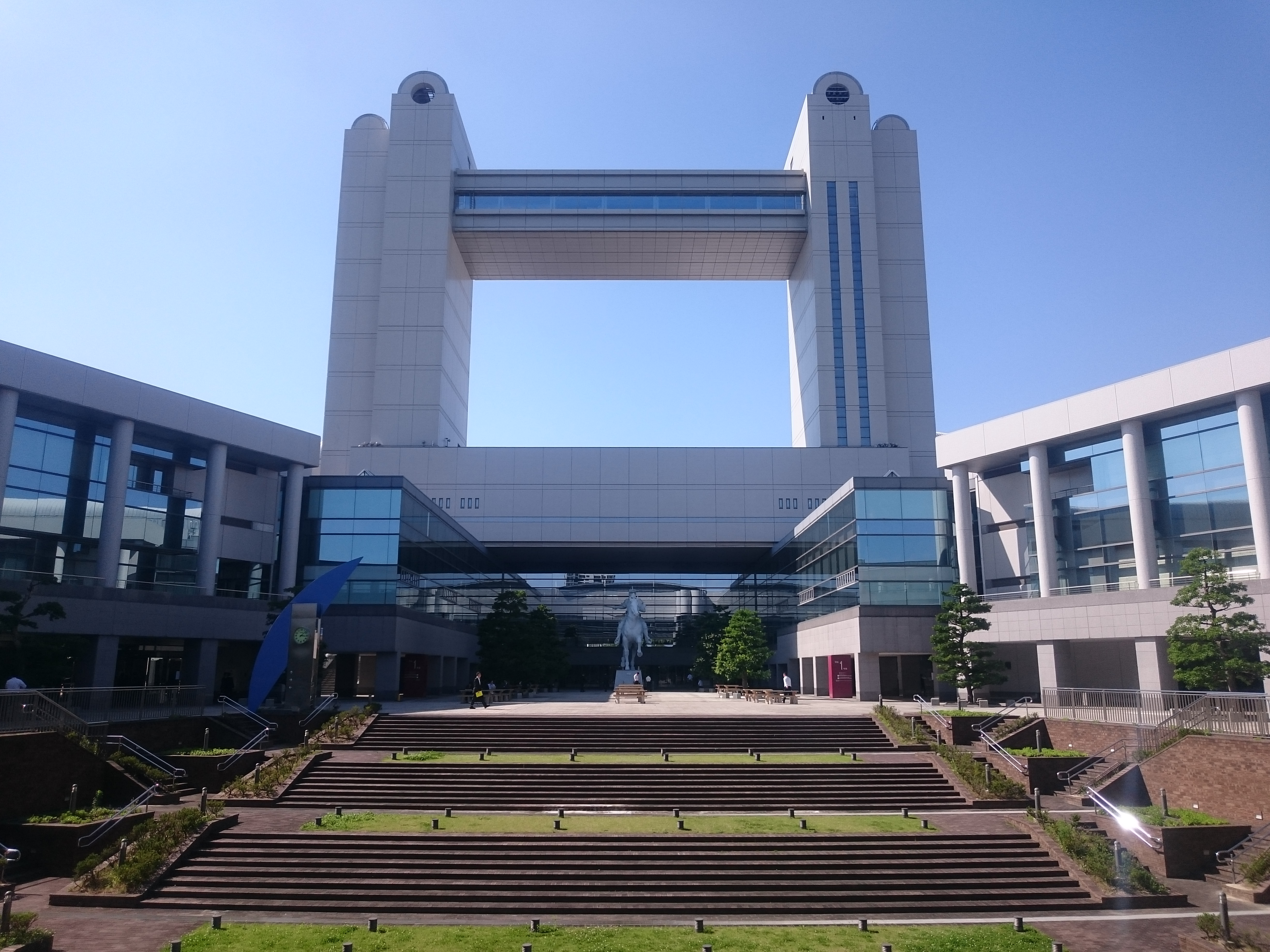
The Nagoya Congress Center was the venue of the exhibition

The World Design Exhibition 1989 (世界デザイン博覧会), also abbreviated "Design-Haku", was an event held at the Nagoya Congress Center July 15 - November 26, 1989. It was hosted by the World Design Organization. Other venues included Nagoya Castle and Nagoya Port.

It was visited by over 15 million people. The congress of the host organisation was also held there in the same year.

Following the expo the International Design Centre Nagoya was established in 1992 and opened in 1996.

== Pavilions ==
Shirotori venue

- Theme Pavilion
- White Museum - Fuji Baking,Chunichi Shimbun and Tokai-TV shared the same building space.
- NTT Challenge Pavilion
- Hikari Theater - Chubu Electric Power.
- Mitsui&Toshiba Pavilion
- Matsushita Pavilion
- Third Planet Pavilion - Morimura Group.
- NEC C&C Pavilion
- Sumitomo Pavilion
- Mitsubishi Future Pavilion
- Toyota Group Pavilion
- Toho Gas Fantasy World
- Interior Pavilion- Karimoku and Sangetsu shared the same building space.
- Fujitsu Pavilion 3DCG Theater
- Hitachi Group Pavilion
- Meitec&Chunichi Shimbun&CBC Pavilion
- Aichi 21st Century Pavilion
- Yume Shugo Σ21
- Ovarseas Exhibitors Pavilion
- Shirotori Stage

Nagoya Castle venue

- Water Fantasy Palace - Meitetsu Group.
- Gaudi Castle - Utilized Nagoya Castle Keep.
- Creative Factory Tokai Bank Pavilion
- Karakuri Wonder Land Nagoya City Pavilion
- Chubu no Takumi Pavilion
- Pachinko Pachislot Omoshiro Design Pavilion
- Rinnai Honmaru Stage

Nagoya Port venue

- Uny Group Pavilion
- Tokimeki City Pavilion - Aichi Bank and Chukyo Bank shared the same building space.
- JR Tokai Linear Station
- Nippon Sharyo Pavilion Los Angeles Square
- Design Eye Arena Asahi & Menicon Pavilion
- Port Gallery
- Port Stage

== See also ==
- Nagoya Pan-Pacific Peace Exposition
- Expo 2005
