= Nagoya Congress Center =

Convention center in Nagoya, Aichi Prefecture, Japan

Nagoya Congress Center 名古屋国際会議場
- Century Plaza
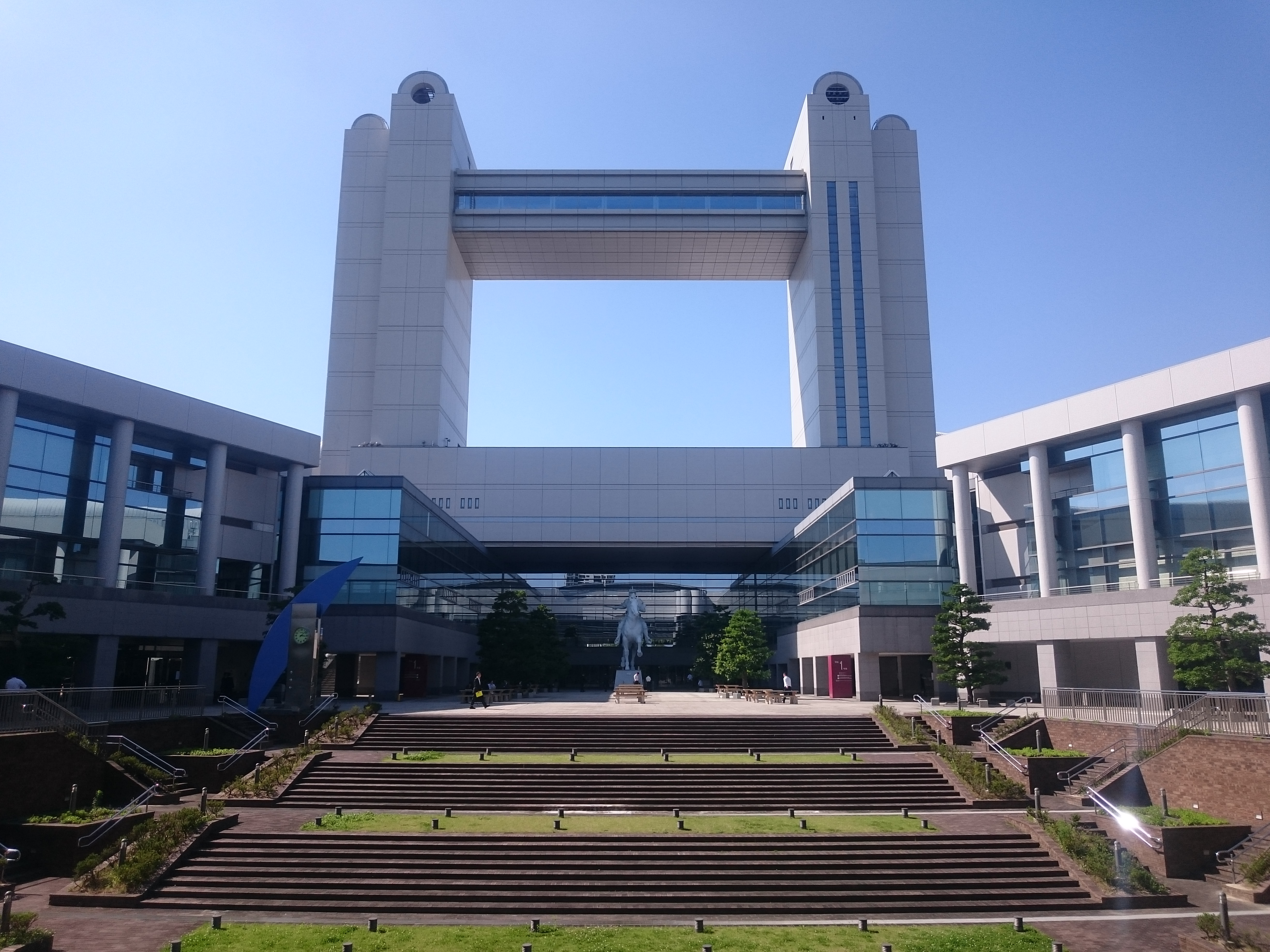
- Interactive map of Nagoya Congress Center 名古屋国際会議場
- Location: Shirotori Park; Atsuta-ku, Nagoya, Aichi Prefecture; Japan
- Coordinates: 35.132081°N 136.898049°E
- Owner: City of Nagoya
- Capacity: 3,000
- Type: Convention center

Construction
- Built: April 1987
- Opened: July 1989

Website
- Homepage (in English)

The Nagoya Congress Center (名古屋国際会議場, Nagoya Kokusai Kaigijō) is a multi-purpose convention center, in the city of Nagoya, Aichi Prefecture, Japan.

The centre was constructed for the World Design Exhibition 1989 (世界デザイン博覧会). Other venues included Nagoya Castle and Nagoya Port.

It has 28 meeting rooms. The amount of exhibition space is 3,625 square metres.

== Venues ==
- Century Hall: 3,000 seats
- Event Hall: 1,480 seats
- Shirotori Hall: 1,280 seats

== Past events ==
- 2010 Convention on Biological Diversity Congress
- 2013 T-ara Japan Tour 2013: Treasure Box
