= Nagoya Pan-Pacific Peace Exposition =

1937 World's Fair in Japan

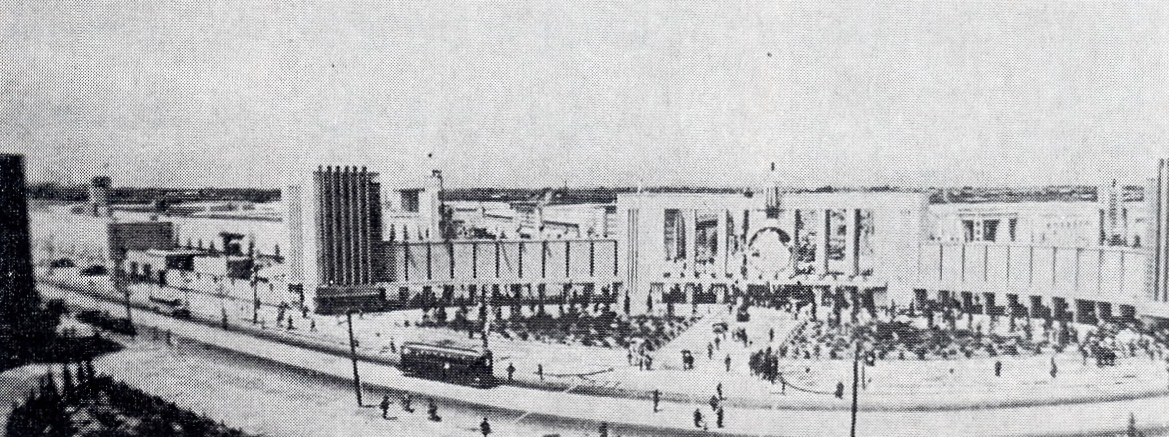
- West site entrance

Overview
- BIE-class: Unrecognized exposition
- Name: Nagoya Pan-Pacific Peace Exposition
- Area: 119 acres
- Visitors: 4,808,164
- Organized by: Higashikuni Naruhiko (chair)

Participant(s)
- Countries: 28

Location
- Country: Japan
- City: Nagoya
- Venue: Atsutamaeshinden
- Coordinates: 35°6′25.7″N 136°53′5″E

Timeline
- Opening: 15 March 1937
- Closure: 31 May 1937

The Nagoya Pan-Pacific Peace Exposition (1937) (名古屋汎太平洋平和博覧会, Nagoya hantaiheiyo heiwa hakurankai) was a world's fair held in what is now part of the Minami Ward of Nagoya city, Japan, from 15 March to 31 May in 1937.

== History ==
Sponsored by the Japanese government and with HIH Prince Higashikuni Naruhiko as chairman, the Nagoya Pan-Pacific Peace Exposition was intended to promote industry, transportation, education, science, construction, architecture, social welfare, tourism, fine arts and crafts. Each of the participating nations or colonies had its own pavilion to promote its products and culture, and each of the prefectures of Japan (with the exception of Tottori and the external territories of Taiwan, Karafuto and Korea) also had a pavilion. In addition, major Japanese industries also sponsored their own pavilions.

Over the two and a half months of operation, the Nagoya Exhibition received more than 4,800,000 visitors, or roughly four times the population of the greater Nagoya area at the time. Daily attendance averaged at 61,643 people.

== List of participating countries ==
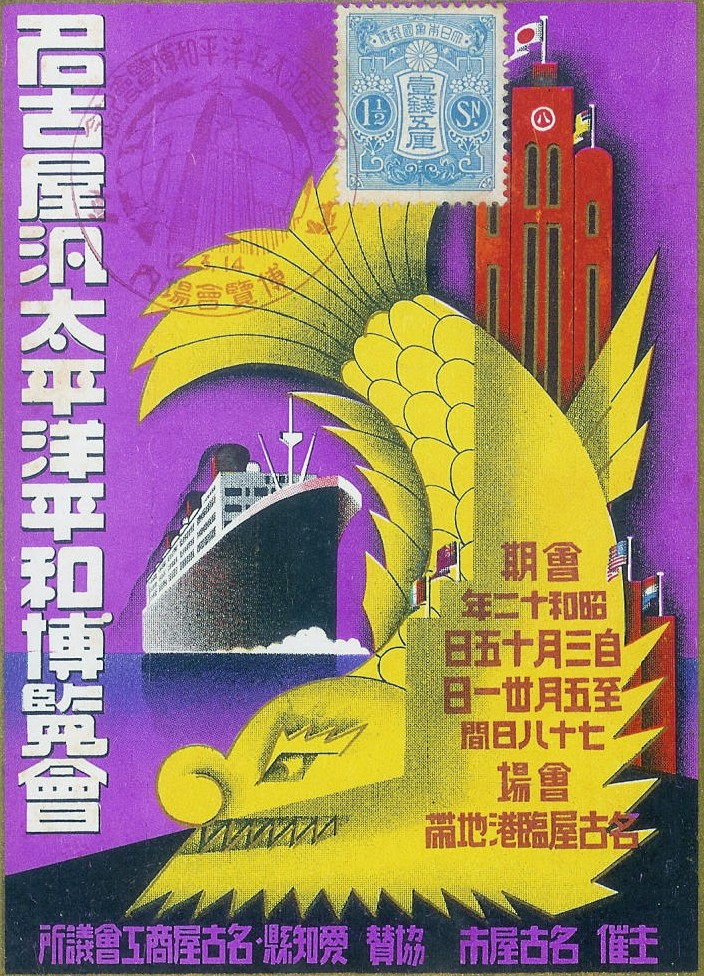

1. Japan
2. Manchukuo
3. Siam
4. Netherlands East Indies
5. Brazil
6. China
7. Mysore
8. Singapore
9. Philippines
10. Mexico
11. Guatemala
12. Honduras
13. Costa Rica
14. El Salvador
15. Panama
16. Venezuela
17. Colombia
18. Peru
19. Chile
20. Australia
21. French Indochina
22. Burma
23. Ceylon
24. Union of South Africa
25. Argentina
26. Canada
27. Cuba
28. United States

The Second Sino-Japanese War erupted only two months after the Exposition closed.

== See also ==
- World Design Exhibition 1989
- Expo 2005
