= Maruei =

Nagoya Department Store

Maruei 丸栄

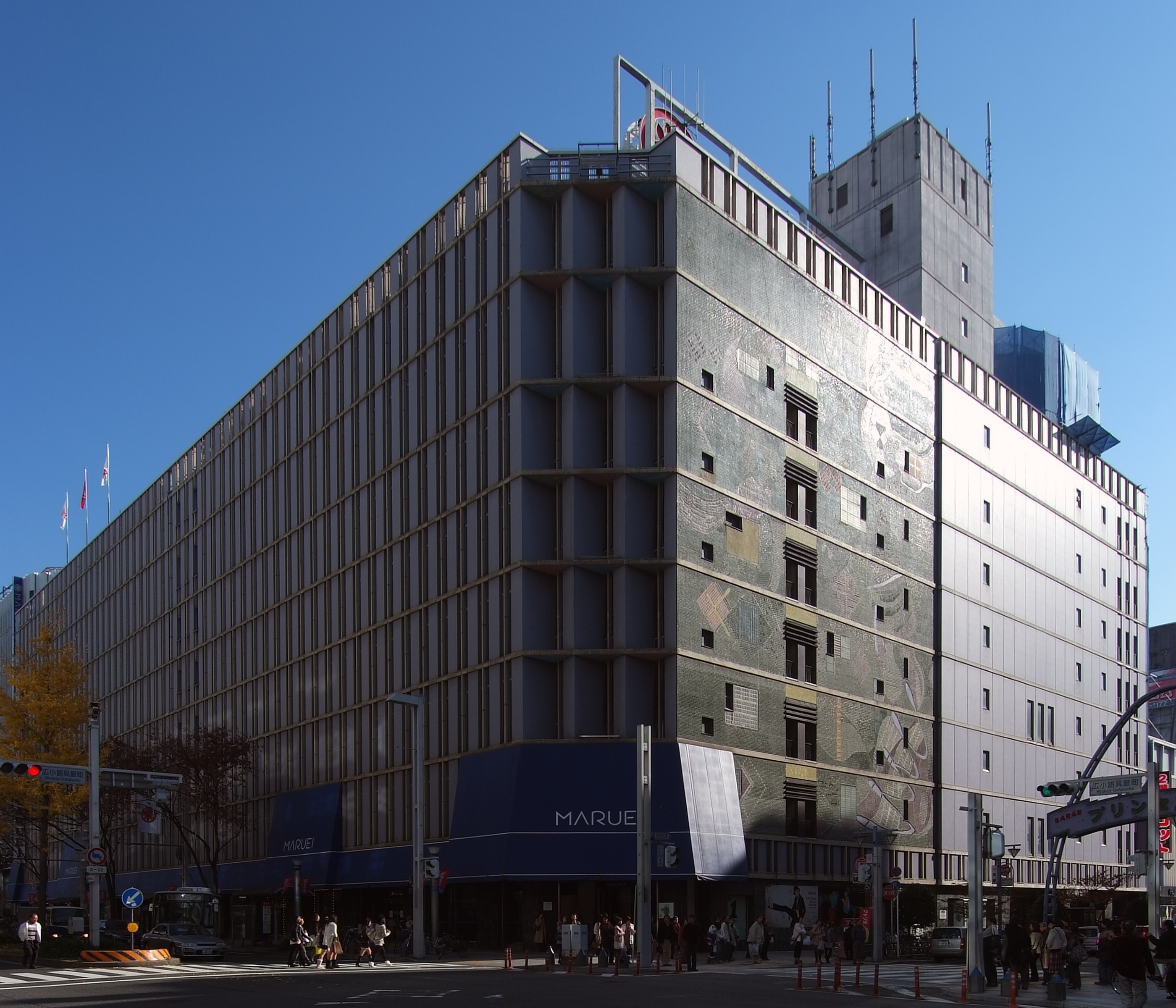
- Industry: Retailing
- Founded: 1615 (JUICHIYA); 1943 (Maruei Department Store Co., Ltd.)
- Headquarters: Sakae, Nagoya, Japan

Maruei (丸栄) (TYO: 8245) is a department store in Nagoya Japan. Toyohashi Maruei (豊橋丸栄) in Toyohashi, Aichi is a subsidiary company.

Along with Matsuzakaya, Meitetsu, and formerly Oriental Nakamura (now Mitsukoshi), Maruei is one of the four major department stores of Nagoya.
