= Matsuzakaya =

Japanese department store chain

Matsuzakaya 松坂屋
- Industry: Retailing
- Founded: 1611; 415 years ago (Ito Gofuku); 1910 (Matsuzakaya Co., Ltd.)
- Headquarters: Naka-ku, Nagoya, Japan
- Parent: Daimaru Matsuzakaya Department Stores
- Website: matsuzakaya.co.jp

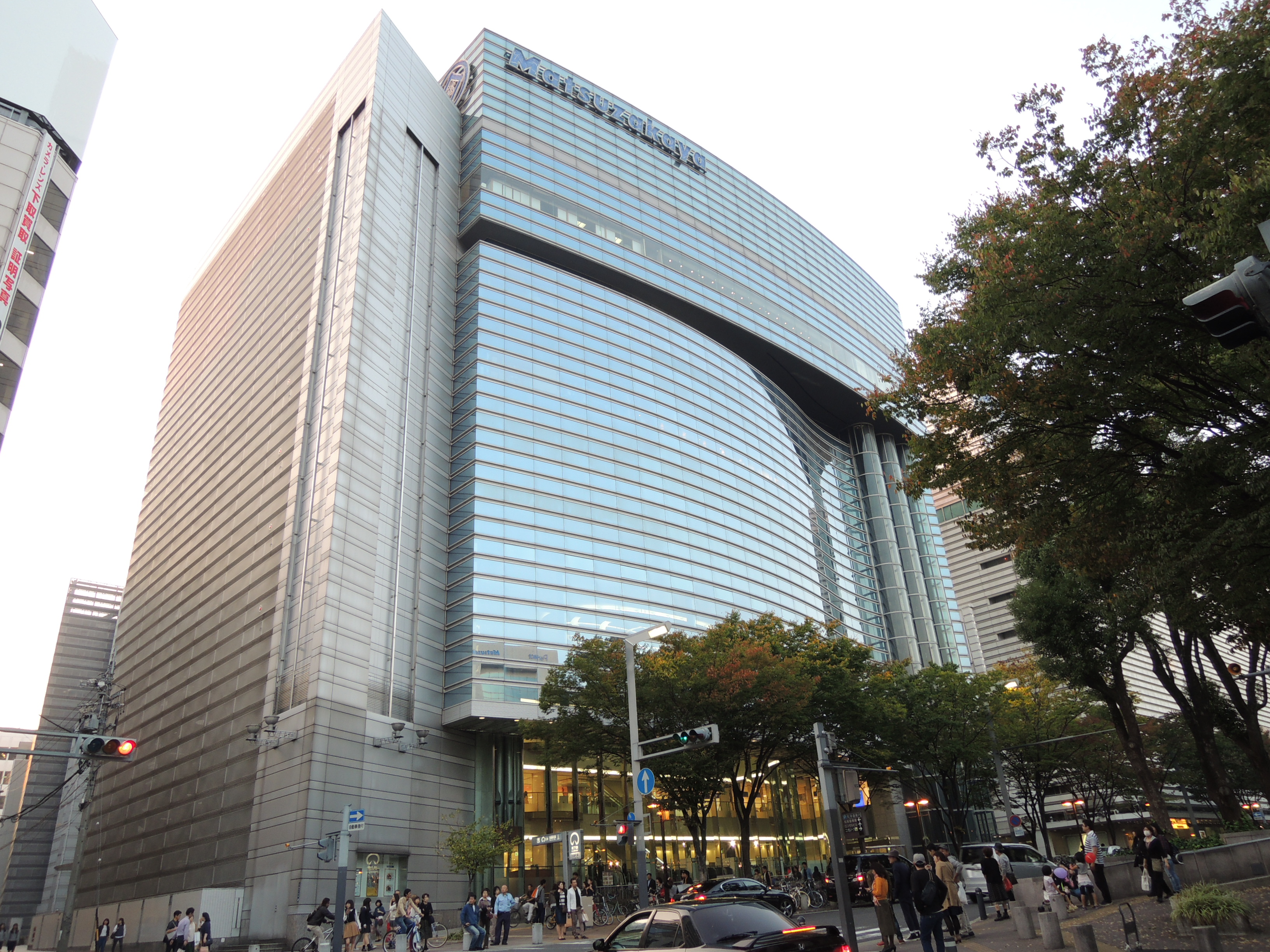
Matsuzakaya South Building in downtown Nagoya

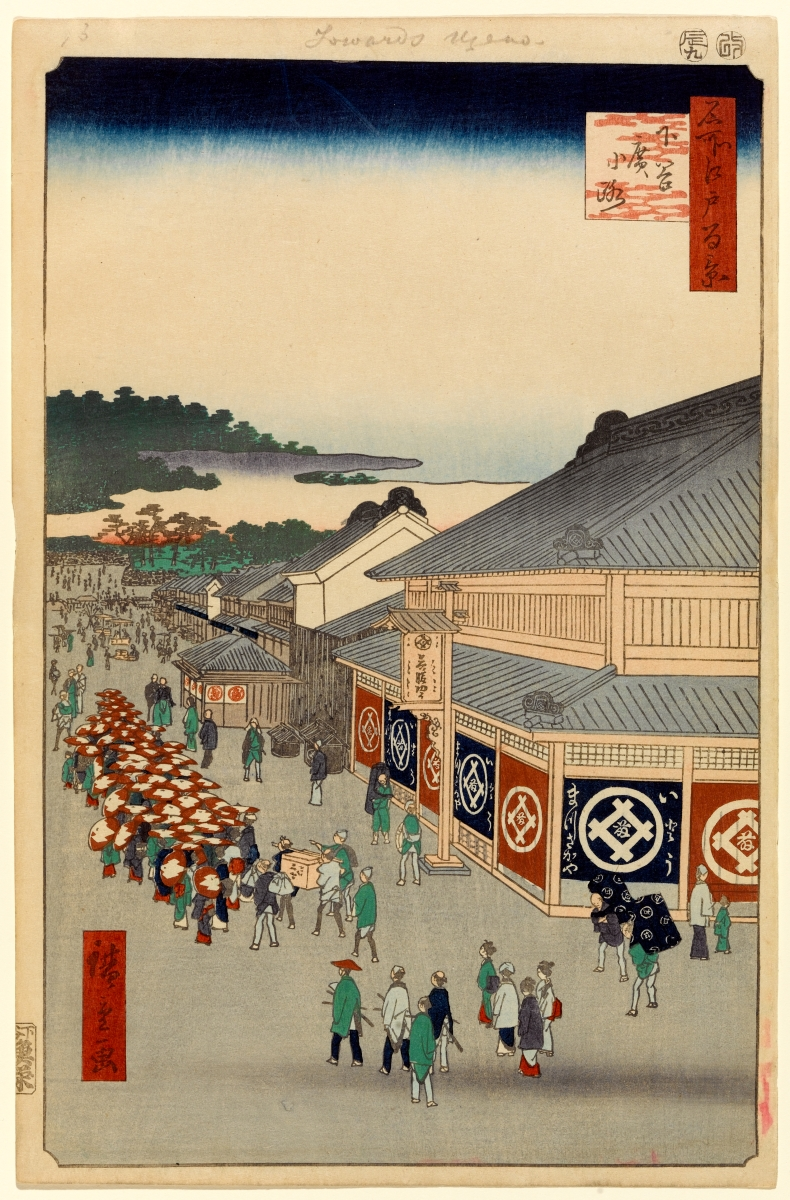
Matsuzakaya store, Ueno at Shitaya Hirokoji (ukiyo-e from One Hundred Famous Views of Edo by Hiroshige II, 1856)

Matsuzakaya (松坂屋) (TYO: 8235, delisted) is a major Japanese department store chain operated by Daimaru Matsuzakaya Department Stores, a subsidiary of J. Front Retailing. When the chain was an independent company, Matsuzakaya Co., Ltd. (株式会社松坂屋, Kabushiki-gaisha Matsuzakaya), it had its headquarters in Naka-ku, Nagoya.

== History ==
Established in 1611 in Nagoya by Sukemichi "Ranmaru" Itō, it is one of the oldest department stores in the world. It was initially a modest wholesale manufactory of silk kimono and Japanese lacquerware. In 1736 the company expanded its business to the retail sale of cotton and linen kimono. A second store was opened in Kyoto in 1745. The old capital was at that time the only region producing high-quality kimono.

The store in Ueno at Shitaya Hirokoji was depicted in an ukiyo-e print from One Hundred Famous Views of Edo by Hiroshige II in 1856.

With the industrialisation during the Meiji era, Matsuzakaya store was changed in 1910 to a western-style department store. In 1924, its Ginza branch became the first department store in Japan where customers could keep their shoes on everywhere inside the store (before that, people had to leave their shoes at the cloakroom). In 1931 a centre for textile art was opened in the Kyoto branch. Between 1931 and 1939, a remarkable collection of kimono came together with the work of dye craftsmen, antique dealers, and private collectors.

Formerly there was a branch at Patterson Street, Causeway Bay, Hong Kong; this was the second Hong Kong branch, the first being when the Japanese Military Government of Hong Kong renamed and transferred Lane Crawford to Matsuzakaya. The branch in Paris had to close when the Japanese economy started cooling in the late 1980s. The store in Yokohama had to close in 2008.

There are branches in Ginza and Ueno in Tokyo, Shizuoka City, Toyota, Aichi, and Takatsuki, Osaka. The store at Ginza was closed in 2013 for a large makeover. It was reopened in 2017 as Ginza Six.

The south wing of the main store in Nagoya has in its lobby a large pipe organ. It was made in Canada and has 3231 pipes, of which the longest is 11 meters. On the top floor of the south wing is the Matsuzakaya Art Museum. The latest exhibitions featured ancient Egyptian treasures from the Egyptian Museum in Cairo, works by Rubens from the collection of the Academy of Fine Arts Vienna, the Lady with an Ermine by Leonardo da Vinci from the Czartoryski Museum in Kraków, and exhibit about empress Maria Theresa and Schönbrunn Palace.

The Guimet Museum in Paris has a special exhibition on the kimono collection of Matsuzakaya from February–May 2017.

Along with Maruei, Meitetsu, and formerly Oriental Nakamura (now Mitsukoshi), Matsuzakaya is one of the four major department stores of Nagoya.

== Public transport ==
The main store in Nagoya is served by Yabachō Station and has a direct underground passage and entry to the subway.
