= Yabachō Station =

Metro station in Nagoya, Japan

Coordinates: 35.1640°N 136.9092°E

M04 Yabachō Station 矢場町駅
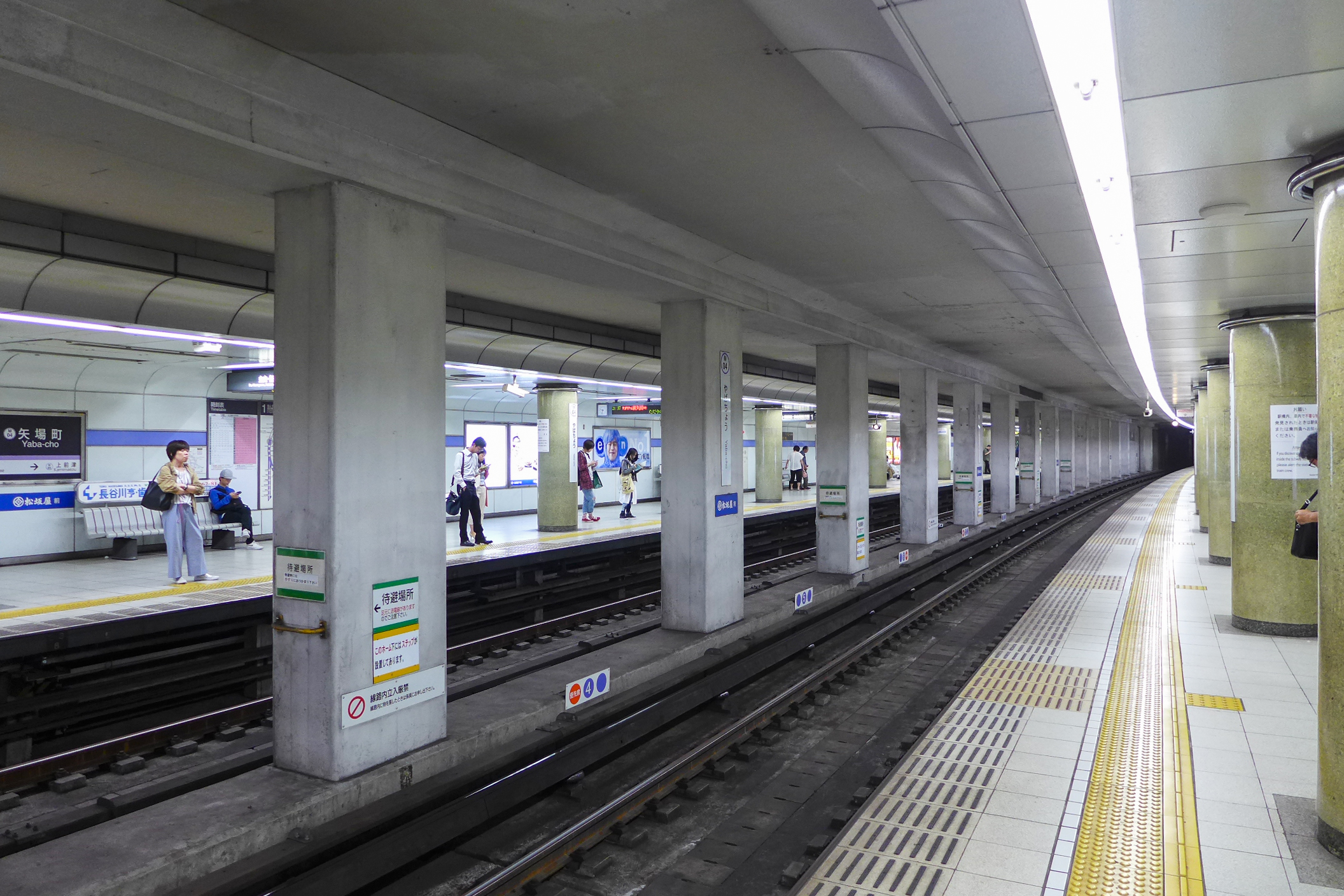
- Yabachō Station platform in June 2017

General information
- Location: Sakae 3-31-13, Naka, Nagoya, Aichi （名古屋市中区栄三丁目31-13） Japan
- System: Nagoya Municipal Subway station
- Operator: Transportation Bureau City of Nagoya
- Line: Meijō Line
- Connections: Bus stop

Other information
- Station code: M04

History
- Opened: 30 March 1967; 59 years ago

Passengers
- 2009: 25,818 daily

Services
Preceding station	Nagoya Municipal Subway	Following station
Kamimaezu M03 anticlockwise	Meijō Line	Sakae M05 clockwise
Location

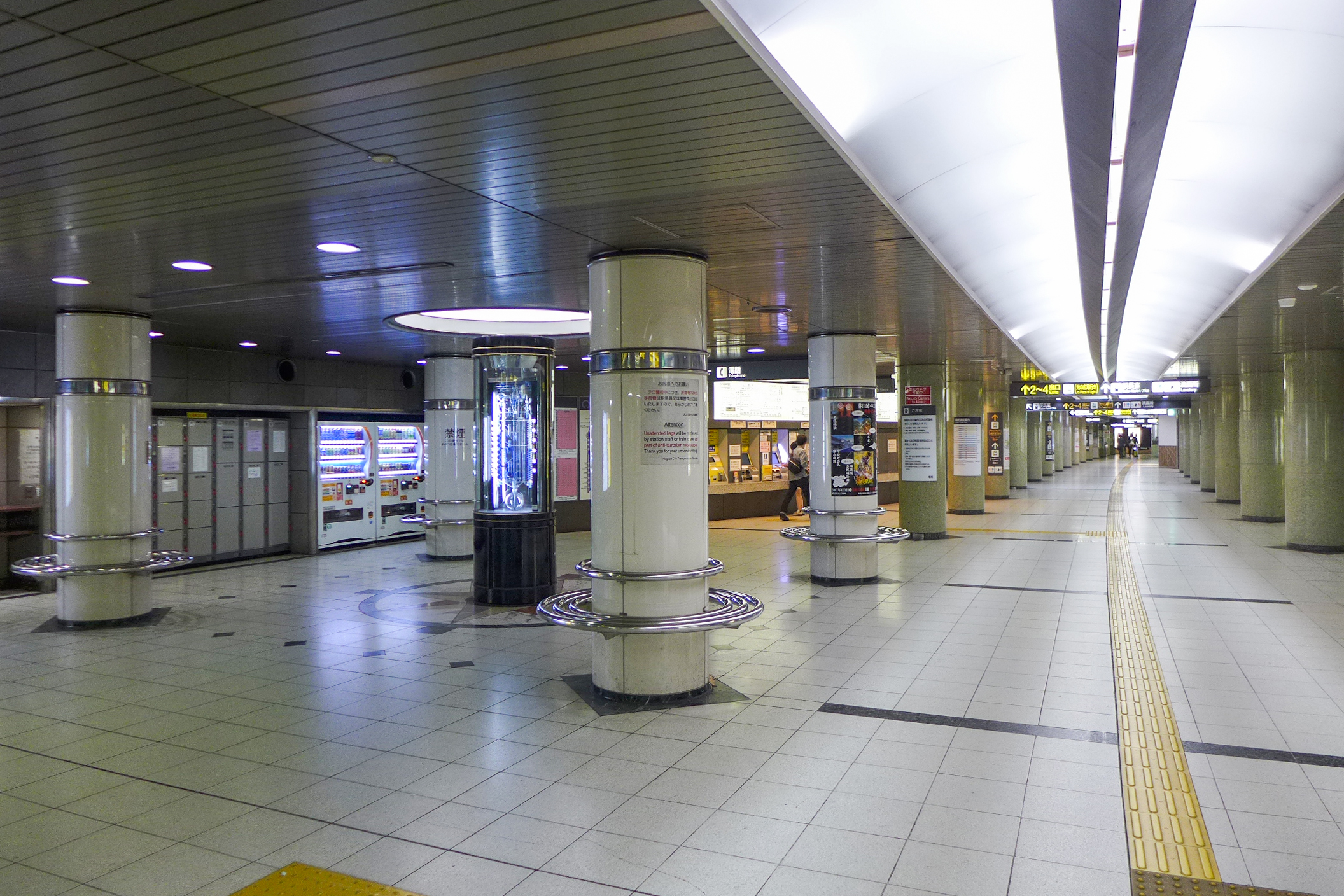
Station concourse with the mechanical water clock on the left side

Yabachō Station (矢場町駅, Yabachō-eki) is an underground metro station located in Naka-ku, Nagoya, Aichi Prefecture, Japan, operated by the Nagoya Municipal Subway. It is located 2.3 rail kilometers from the terminus of the Meijō Line at Kanayama Station. This station provides access to several department stores in Sakae such as Parco and Matsuzakaya.

== History ==
Yabachō Station was opened on 30 March 1967. It is named after the historic neighbourhood of Yaba-chō.

At the entrance to the turnstiles, a mechanical water clock by the French scientist Bernard Gitton was installed in the 1990s.

== Lines ==
- Nagoya Municipal Subway
  - Meijō Line (Station number: M04)

== Layout ==
Yabacho Station has two underground opposed side platforms.

=== Platforms ===
1	■ Meijō Line	For Kanayama, Aratamabashi, and Nagoyakō (counterclockwise)
2	■ Meijō Line	For Sakae and Ōzone (clockwise)
