= Sakae, Nagoya =

Coordinates: 35°10′1.715″N 136°53′46.37″E

Sakae 栄
- Night view of Oasis 21 and Nagoya TV Tower (2026)
- Interactive map of Sakae
- Country: Japan
- Region: Chūbu
- Prefecture: Aichi
- City: Nagoya
- Ward: Naka
- Name established: March 30, 1966; 60 years ago

Area
  - Total: 1.42 km^{2} (0.55 sq mi)
- Elevation: 12 m (39 ft)

Population (2019)
  - Total: 10,629
  - Density: 7,490/km^{2} (19,400/sq mi)
- Time zone: UTC+9 (Japan Standard Time)
- Postal code: 460-0008
- Area code: 052
- Vehicle registration: 名古屋

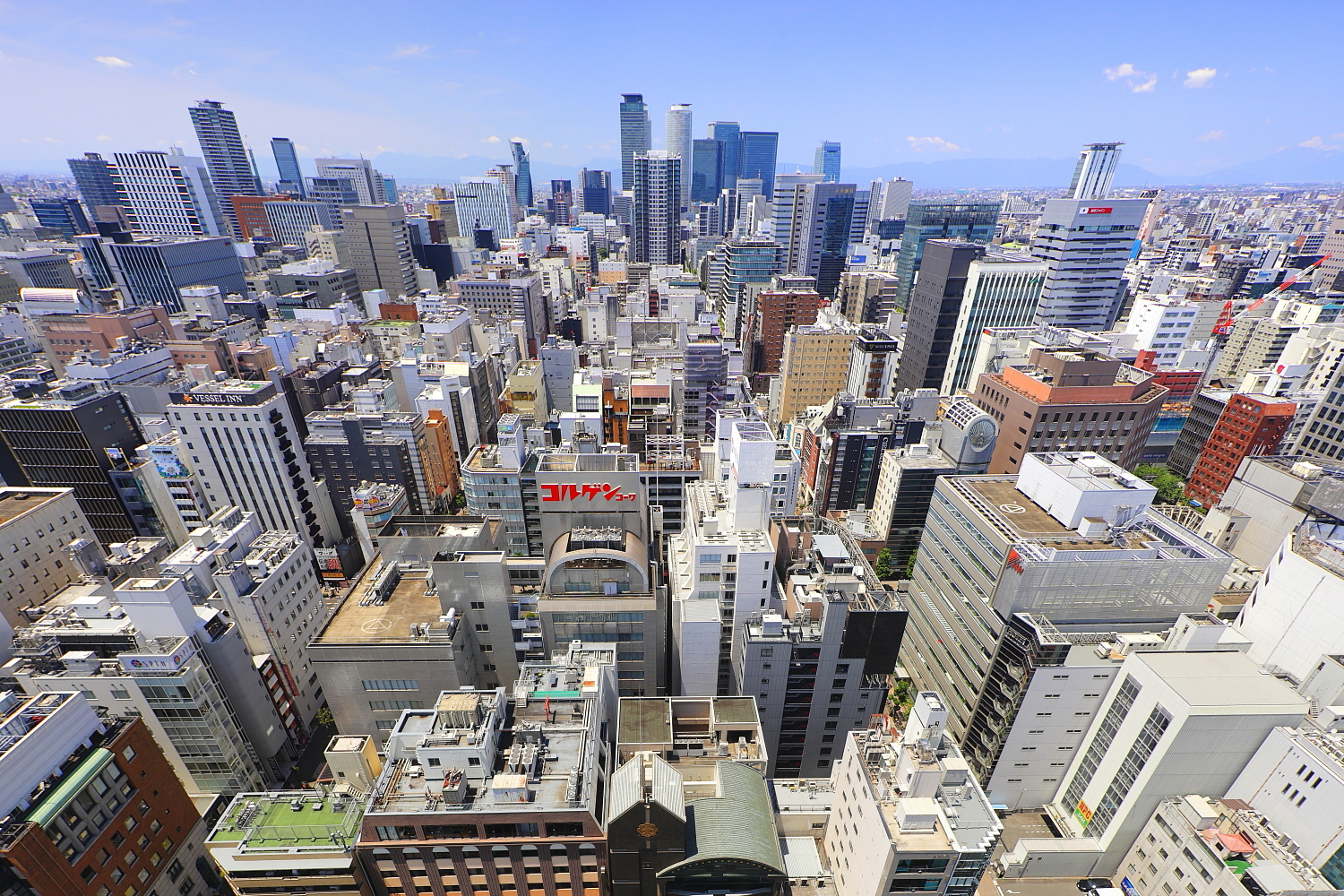
Skyline of Sakae, May 2022

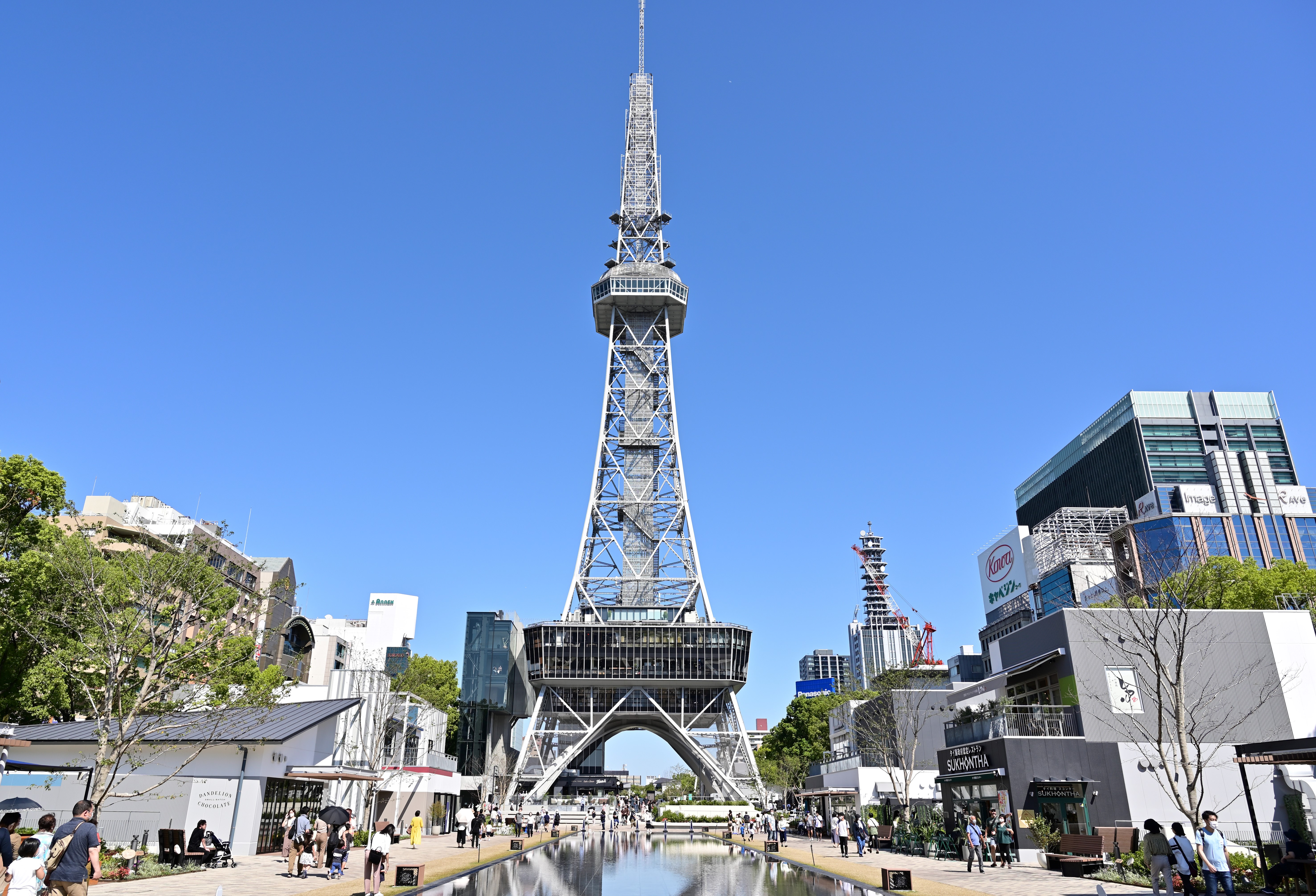
Nagoya TV Tower at the Hisaya Ōdori Park

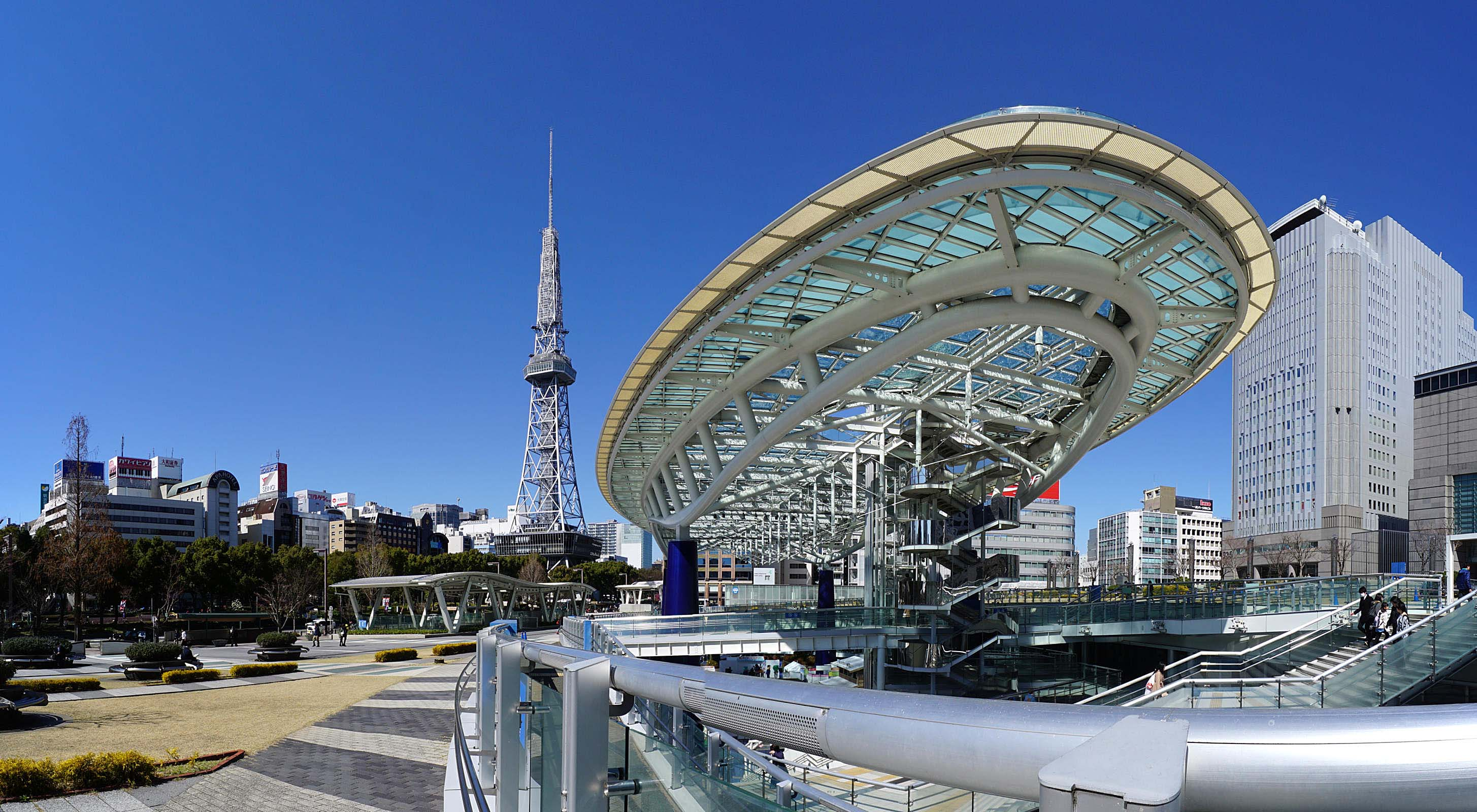
Oasis 21

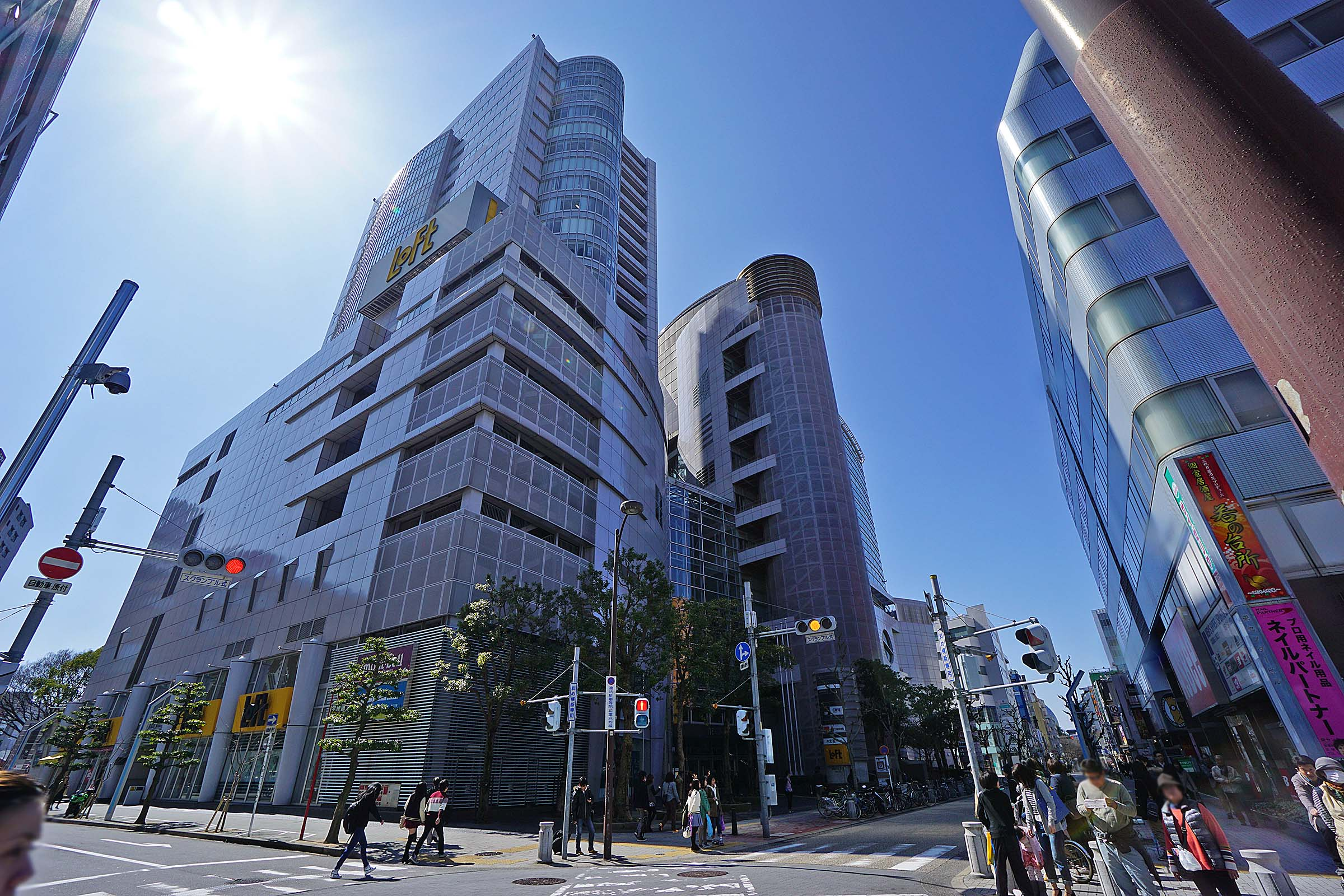
Nadya Park

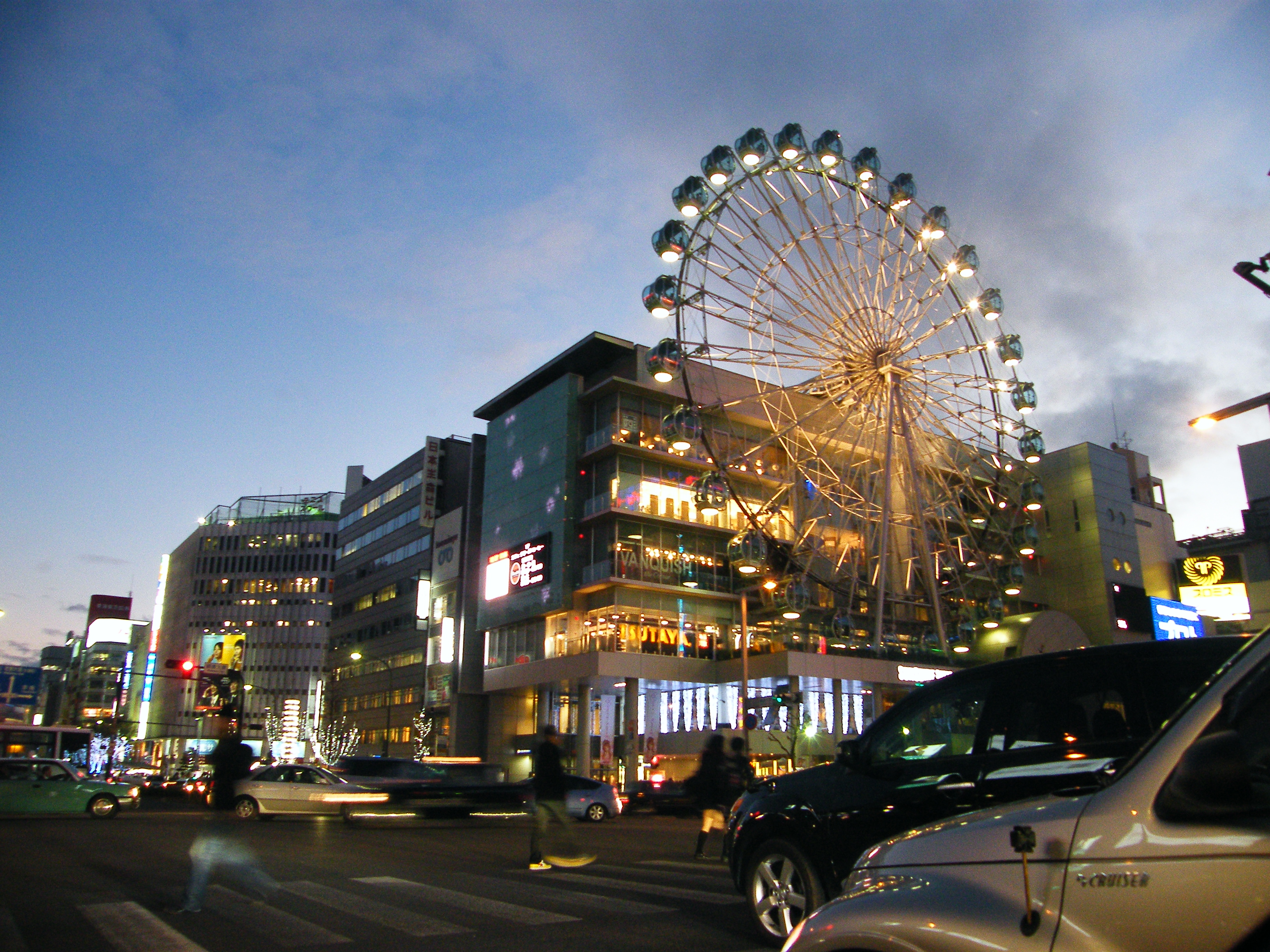
Sunshine Sakae

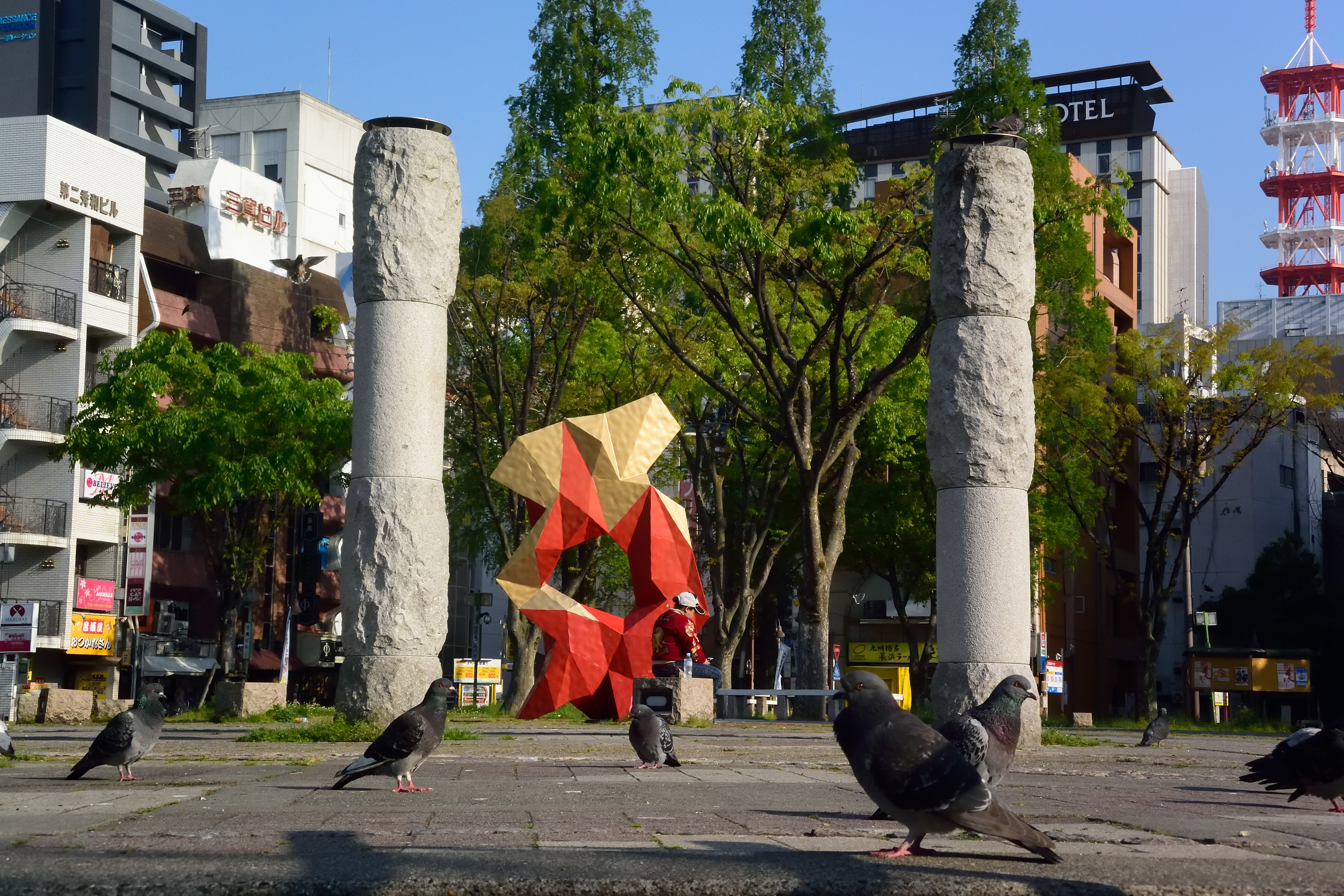
Ikeda park

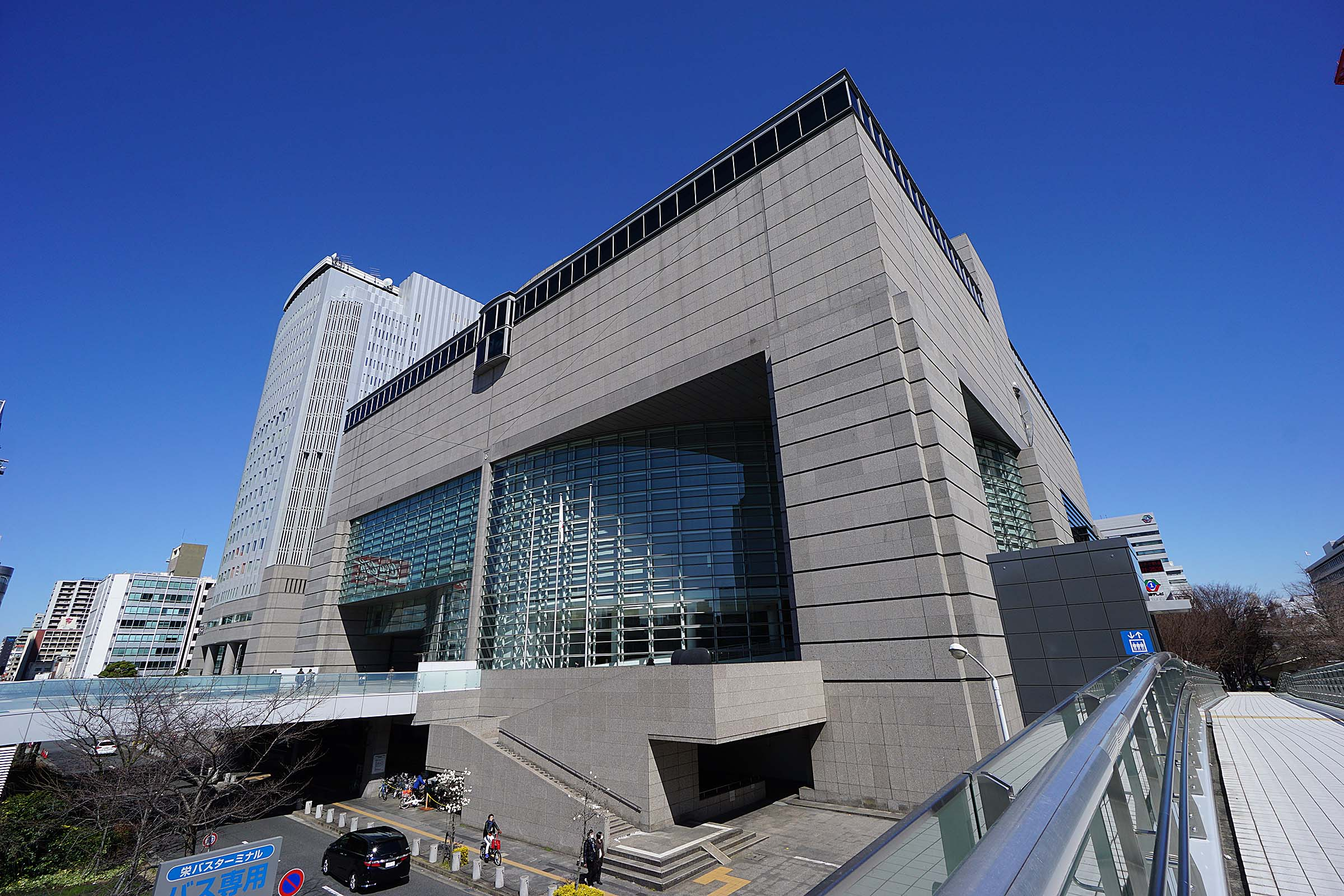
Aichi Arts Center

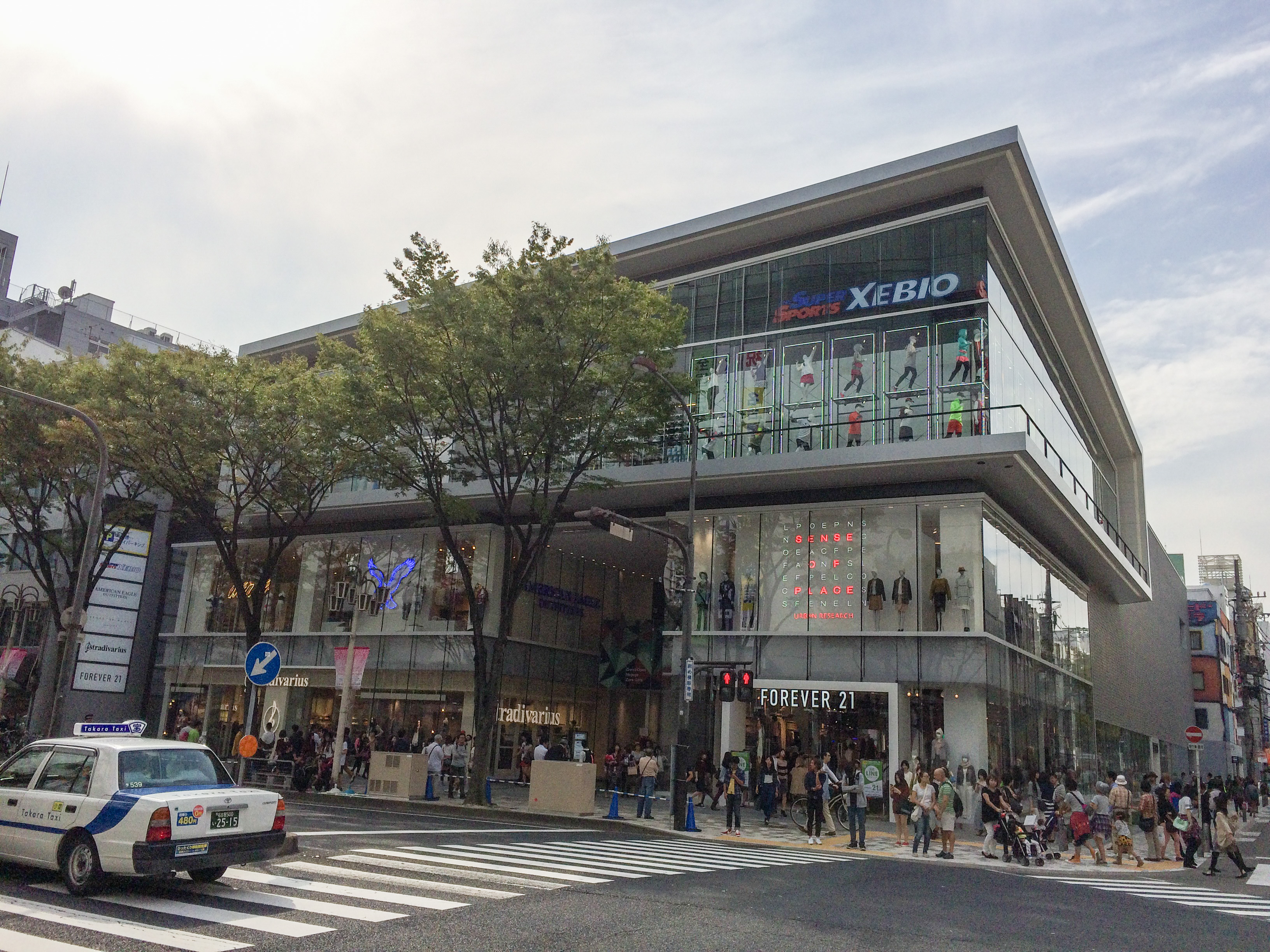
Nagoya ZERO GATE

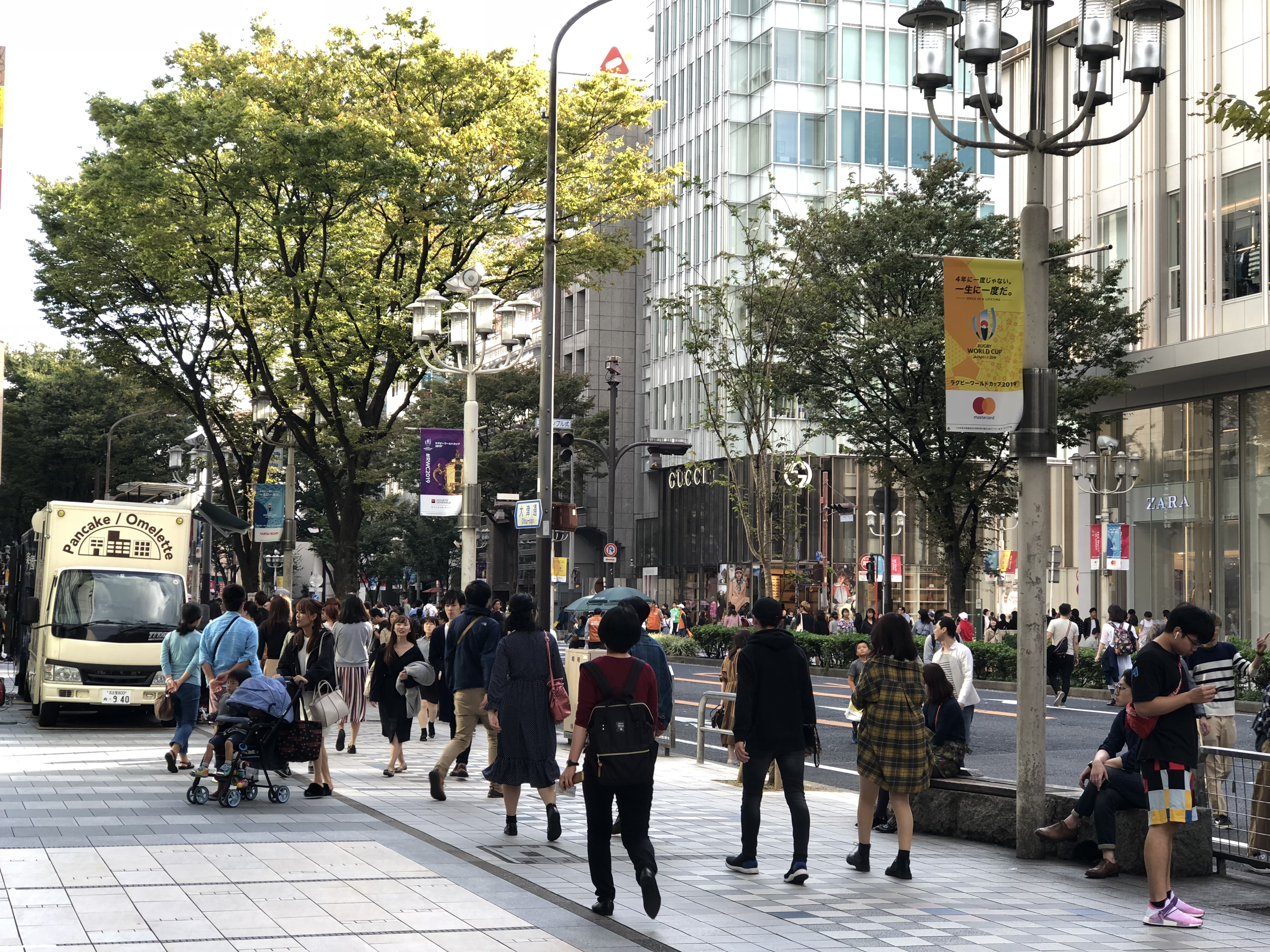
Pedestrian mall of Otu Street

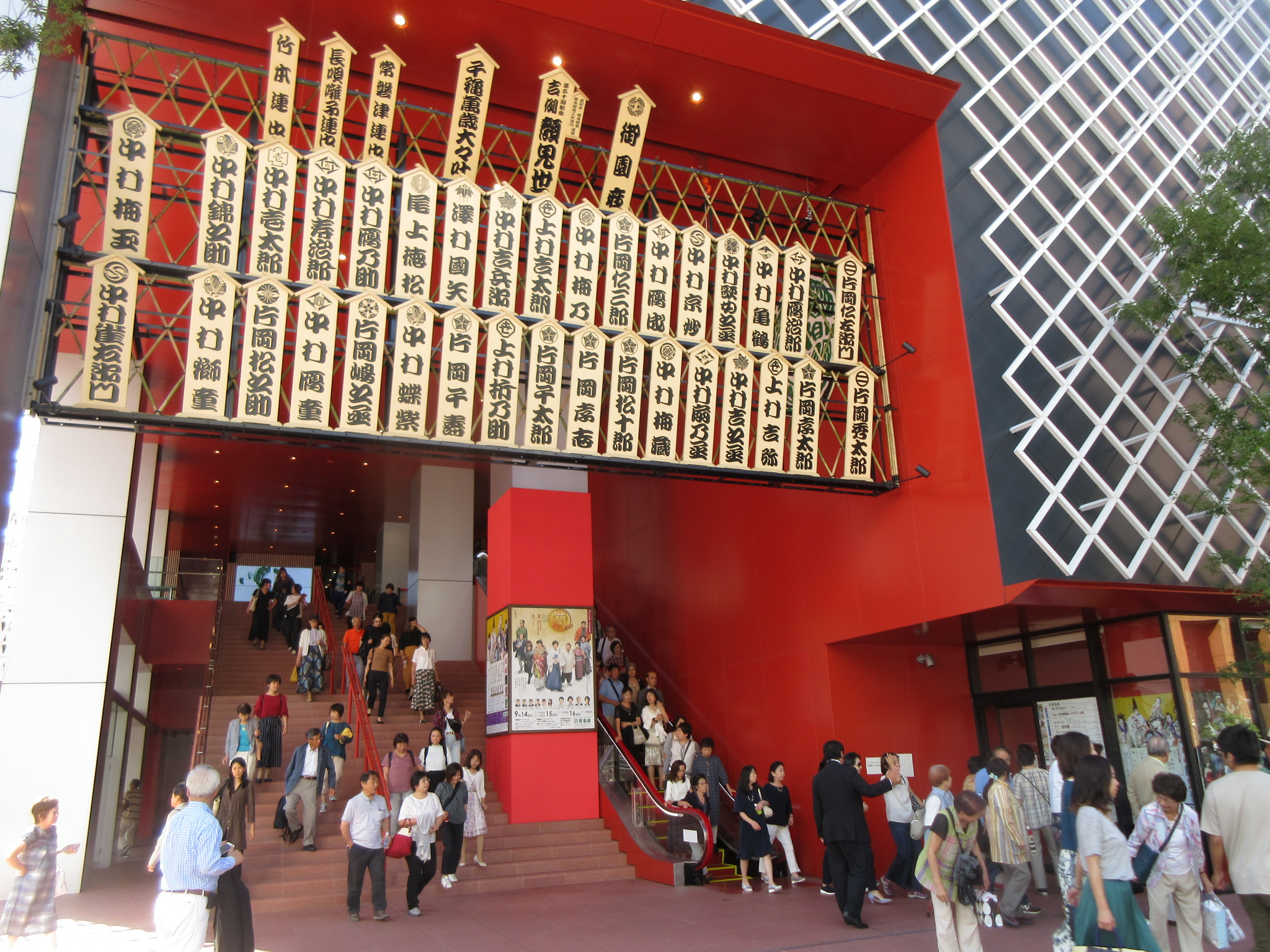
Main entrance to Misono-za theatre

Sakae (栄) is an area in Naka-ku, Nagoya, Aichi, Japan. It refers to the areas around Sakae intersection, Sakae Station on the Nagoya Municipal Subway and Sakae Station on the Meitetsu Seto Line. Sakae is in the heart of Nagoya and is, along with Nagoya Station, one of Nagoya's main commercial districts.

== Overview ==
Shogun Tokugawa Ieyasu founded Nagoya in 1612 as a grid-planned castle town after relocating the Owari clan's ancestral seat from Kiyosu to Nagoya, also known as the "Kiyosu-goshi".

The Great Manji Fire of 1660, which destroyed half of the castle town, is when the name Hirokoji, or "widened small street", first appeared. The Horikiri road (Hisaya-cho to Choja-machi), which runs along the southern boundary of the grid, has been enlarged from 5 meters to 27 meters. Hirokoji-dori, the hub of entertainment and recreation, would be crowded with people on festival days.

Hirokoji-dori, which connects Nagoya Station to the lively, central Sakae neighborhood during the Meiji era, was the primary thoroughfare.

The Sakae district is formed around the Sakae intersection Otsu-dori going north–south and Hirokōji-dori going east–west. It is the main shopping district of Nagoya, along with Nagoya Station and its immediate vicinity.

Parallel to Otsu-dori is Hisaya-Ōdori; this road runs from Yaba-cho to Sakae except for Sotobori-dori, which is maintained as Hisaya Ōdori Park. Popular events are held in this park on the weekend.

Also, inside Hisaya-odori Park is the 180-meter Nagoya TV Tower, built in 1954, which is often mentioned as a symbol of Nagoya. At night, the tower is lit and can be seen all over Sakae. Adjacent to the tower is a large facility called Oasis 21, which has restaurants, stores, and a bus terminal. Adjacent to Oasis 21 is the major cultural facility Aichi Fine Arts Center, which contains facilities such as Aichi Fine Art Museum and Aichi Performing Arts Theater.

The department stores Matsuzakaya, Maruei Sakae, and Mitsukoshi are known as the 3M of Nagoya (or 4M if Meitetsu Department Store is included). Large shopping facilities such as Yaba-cho Parco, Nadya Park, and Lachic, among others, extend to the adjacent area known as Yaba-cho. In recent years, high-end luxury import brand stores as have been increasing along Otsu-dori, making it one of the country's foremost brand store areas. Along with those, the number of high-end furniture and home interior stores has been increasing. There is a Noritake branch here.

At stations at each of these lines where they come together, the Higashiyama Line, under Hirokoji-dori running parallel to Nishiki-dori, and the Meijō Line and Meitetsu Seto Line, under Hisaya-odori, have vast underground shopping areas, such as Sakae-Mori Underground Shopping Center (in Sakae Station), Sakae Chika (under Hirokoji-dori), and Central Park (under the northern section of Hisaya-Odori Park). Under Hisaya-odori Park are huge, multistory parking areas such as Hisaya Municipal Parking Area and Angel Park.

== History ==
Since the Moving of Kiyosu, at the time of the setup of Nagoya Castle, the area of Sakae was at the southeastern tip of the area around Nagoya Castle and served as an entrance to Kamiida Road. Houses were scattered around the area.

At the Meiji Restoration, public offices (such as those of the prefectural government and the schools) as well as businesses (like traditional Japanese restaurants) were created. At the same time, a tram along Hirokoji-dori started running, expanding the town. In 1902 (year 35 of the Meiji Era), Hirokoji-dori road to Chikusa was made and greatly increased traffic to and from the eastern suburbs of Nagoya. In 1910 (year 43 of the Meiji Era) Ito Dry Goods (predecessor to the modern Matsuzakaya) transferred and started business. In 1915 (year 4 of the Taisho Era) Juichiya Department Store (predecessor to the modern Maruei) opened for business. Maruei traces its origins to 1615, but the store known as Maruei opened when Juichiya Department Store and another department store merged on August 27, 1943.

During the final period of World War II, for less than two years, the northern half of Naka Ward was established as Sakae Ward.

After World War II, according to the postwar reconstruction plan, Hisaya-odori and Nishiki-dori, among others, were reconstructed. From the reconstruction of infrastructure such as parks, subways, and underground shopping areas, the Sakae area has developed greatly as Nagoya's central commercial area.

In recent years, although places like Oasis 21 and Sakae Park continue to operate, development in the area of Nagoya Station has been remarkable, and Sakae is searching for a way to remain as the center of Nagoya.

SKE48 and its theater are based in this area.

== Geography ==
Generally, what is known as Sakae was the area denoted before as Sakae Town, which had its center at Sakae Intersection. There are many places known as Sakae, such as Nishiki, Shin-sakae town, Higashi-ku Higashisakura, north of Sakae proper, and adjacent north of Nishiki, the south side of Marunouchi and one section of Higashi-ku Izumi.

In this way, the Sakae district has a wide range, encompassing many well-known places. There are areas also known by the names of streets like Hirokoji or Hisaya-odori. Sakae includes Nishiki 3-chōme or "sankin", a red light district. The area is divided into the north and south districts, in the same manner as Osaka.

As for town names, in 1966 (year 41 of the Showa Era), the whole area encompassed by the Airport Line going east, Horikawa going west, Wakamiya-dori going south, Hirokoji going north was made to use the new address names Sakae 1-chome to Sakae 5-chome, destroying the old historical town names. For this reason, the Sakae 1-chome and Sakae 2-chome around Fushimi Station are Fushimi, Sakae 3-chome and Sakae 5-chome around Yaba-cho station are Yaba-cho, and are also known by these older names.

== Transportation ==
- Rail
  - Nagoya Municipal Subway
    - Sakae Station - Higashiyama Line, Meijō Line
    - Yabachō Station - Meijō Line
    - Fushimi Station - Higashiyama Line, Tsurumai Line
    - Hisaya-ōdōri Station - Sakura-dōri Line
  - Meitetsu
    - Sakaemachi Station, Meitetsu Seto Line
- Roads
  - Hisaya Odori
  - Otsu-dori
  - Sakuradori (Route No. 19)
  - Nishiki Tooru
  - Hirokoji-dori (street Nagakute, Aichi, Nagoya Line No. 60)
  - Wakamiya Odori
  - Nagoya City Road Takaoka (Airport Line)

== Main establishments ==
1-chome

- Asahi Kaikan (Nagoya headquarters of Asahi Shimbun)
- Hilton Nagoya
- Barn Bridge Richmond Hotel Nagoya
- Yomiuri Shimbun Chūbu Branch
- Head Toenec Corporation
- Misonoza
- Shin Nagoya Musical Theater
- Sakae Elementary School

2-chome

- Nittochi Nagoya Building
- Mitsui Sumitomo Insurance Group Shirakawa Hall
- Electric Culture Museum (Electric Science Museum)
- Nagoya Chamber of Commerce
- Shirakawa Park
  - Nagoya City Science Museum
  - Nagoya City Art Museum

3-chome

- Maruzen
- Maruei Sukairu
- Mitsukoshi Nagoya
- Lachic Sakae
- Matsuzakaya Nagoya
- Nagoya PARCO
- Nadya Park
- AsahidoCamera
- Yamada Denki Sakae
- Washington Hotel Plaza Sakae
- Chukyo Bank, Limited Head Office
- Aichi Bank head office
- Wakamiya Hachiman Inc.
- Ando Cloisonné Company

4-chome

- Chunichi Building
- Naka-ku Ward Office
- Nihon Keizai Shimbun Nagoya Branch
- Nagoya Tokyu Hotel
- Shojitaijidori
- Soji Hall

5-chome

- International Design Centre Nagoya
- NTT Naka building (NTT Tokai Branch Neomeito)

== Idol groups from Nagoya ==
- SKE48 (2008-present)
