= Tōkai Television Broadcasting =

Japanese television station

JOFX-DTV
- Logo used since 1968. (Note: The logo's wordmark has been in use since 1965.)

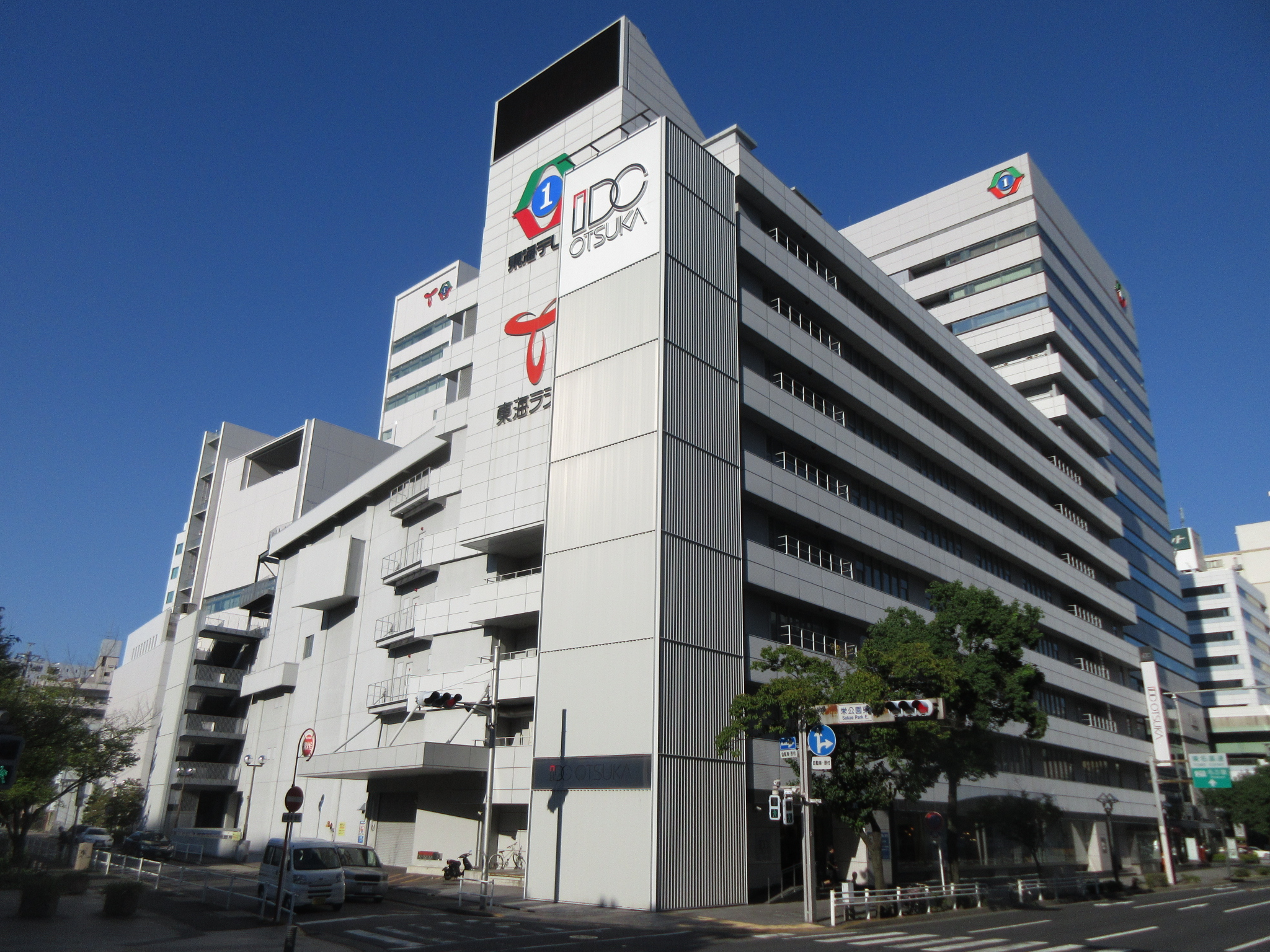
- Headquarters in Higashi-ku, Nagoya
- Chubu region; Japan
- City: Nagoya, Aichi Prefecture
- Channels: Digital: 21 (UHF); Virtual: 1
- Branding: Tokai Television; THK

Programming
- Language: Japanese
- Affiliations: Fuji News Network and Fuji Network System

Ownership
- Owner: Tokai Television Broadcasting Co., Ltd.

History
- First air date: December 25, 1958
- Former call signs: JOFX-TV (1958–2011)
- Former channel numbers: 1 (VHF analog, 1958–2011)
- Call sign meaning: Fuji X (similar to sister stations whose fourth letter is an X)

Technical information
- Licensing authority: MIC
- Transmitter coordinates: 35°10′20.7″N 136°54′30″E

Links
- Website: www.tokai-tv.com
- Native name: 東海テレビ放送株式会社
- Romanized name: Tōkaiterebihōsō kabushikigaisha
- Type: Kabushiki gaisha
- Industry: Media
- Founded: February 1, 1958
- Headquarters: 1-14-27 Higashisakura, Higashi-ku, Nagoya, Aichi Prefecture, Japan
- Key people: Hiroshi Kojima (president and CEO)
- Services: Television broadcasting
- Subsidiaries: Tokai TV Enterprise; Tokai TV Production; Unimall
- Footnotes; Data from its corporate profile

JOFX-DTV (channel 1), branded as Tokai Television, (Note: Japanese: 東海テレビ, Hepburn: Tōkai Terebi; THK) is a Japanese television station serving as an affiliate of the Fuji News Network and the Fuji Network System for the Chūbu region. Owned and operated by Tokai Television Broadcasting Co., Ltd., (Note: 東海テレビ放送株式会社, Tōkaiterebihōsō kabushikigaisha) its headquarters and studios are located at the Tokai Hoso Kaikan buildings in the Higashi-ku ward of Nagoya, Aichi Prefecture.

== History ==
=== 1957–1964: Founding and early broadcasts ===
In 1957, seven companies applying for the third television broadcasting license in the Tokai region made a joint bid: Tokai Broadcasting, Tokai TV, Tokai Radio, Kinki Tokai Broadcasting, Nippon Color TV, Nagoya Broadcasting and Nippon Television. Tokai Broadcasting, Tokai TV, Tokai Radio, and Kinki Tokai Broadcasting merged to form New Tokai Television and obtained a broadcasting license on October 22, 1957.

It was anticipated that New Tokai TV would broadcast on channel 1 in the Tokai region, although there were voices in the regulator who believed that channel 1 should be used by CBC, as it was historically the first station to broadcast. However, CBC was willing to continue to use channel 5, as its frequency was widely known, and the number was located in the center of the TV channel switching dial at that time. Therefore, Tokai TV used channel 1.

On December 1 of the same year, New Tokai TV set up an office in the New Nagoya Building, and began preparations for broadcasting. On January 20, 1958, the headquarters were established in Higashishincho, Higashi-ku, Nagoya City, and on February 17 the name was changed to Tokai Television, referred to in short as THK.

On December 18, Tokai TV began airing test signals, and began test broadcasts on December 21. At 11:15 on December 25, Tokai TV officially started broadcasting, becoming the 17th private TV station in Japan. At launch time, Tokai TV and Kansai TV established a network relationship. In 1959, with the launch of Fuji TV, Tokai TV joined the network with Fuji TV as the flagship station, but also broadcast some programs from both Nippon TV and NET TV. In 1961, THK abolished the off-air period in the afternoon and broadcast continuously from morning to evening. With the launch of Nagoya TV in 1962, Tokai TV stopped broadcasting programs from both networks, and became a full-time member of the Fuji TV network. In 1964, Tokai TV broadcast a color program for the first time (the British series Stingray), which was being networked by Fuji TV. Four years later, its own programs were now produced in color, the first being Kazuo Hasegawa's Masterpiece Series.

=== 1965–1987: Growth ===
In 1965, Tokai TV adopted a new logo, designed to the concept of "gazing at the modern eye". In 1968, in order to adapt to the arrival of the color TV era, THK changed the color of the central circular part of the logo from black to blue. On May 18 Masahiko Harada's match against Ed Geoffrey, broadcast by Tokai TV, set a record rating of 68%, making the boxing broadcast a signature program of the Fuji TV series. In 1967, as part of the local business contribution, Tokai Television donated a fountain to Nagoya City, which was set up in Sakae Park. Tokai TV produced many commemorative programs on the occasion of its 10th anniversary, among which the TV series Hida Koshito was affirmed by the Meiji Centennial Art Festival. This period was also the first peak in viewership for Tokai TV. In 1967 and 1968, Tokai TV won the triple crown of ratings for two consecutive years. In 1970, Tokai TV became the first company in the Japanese TV industry to have a two-day weekend. In 1977, Tokai TV's pre-tax profit exceeded 10 billion yen.

In 1982, Tokai TV won the Triple Crown of ratings again for the first time in 14 years, due to the increase in the ratings of Fuji TV and an increase in the ratings of the baseball broadcast of games played by the Chunichi Dragons. Tokai TV's average ratings throughout the day reached 9.3%, 18.5% during prime time, and 17.7% during the evening. From the third week of May 1984 to the fourth week of September 4, 1987, Tokai TV ranked first in the average ratings of the whole day for 176 consecutive weeks. Tokai TV's ratings triple crown lasted for 16 years, from 1982 to 1997. In 1987, Tokai TV's pre-tax profit exceeded 20 billion yen, and they aired the 30th anniversary documentary Big White Night Journey to the Extreme North of the Soviet Union, broadcast throughout Japan. In April 1988, Tokai TV started 24-hour broadcasting at weekends.

=== 1989–1999 ===
On January 27, 1989, Tokai TV's 30th anniversary commemorative TV series Nagoya Bride Story was serialized and broadcast until 1998. Its thirdseason in 1991 achieved an audience rating of 29.7% in Nagoya, and won the Excellent Award of the Democratic Federation of Freedom of the Year. In 1991, Tokai TV produced high-definition TV programs for the first time. In 1996, in order to publicize the program, Tokai TV purchased all the advertising space in some carriages of Nagoya Municipal Subway's Higashiyama Line and Meijo Line, and named it "Tokai TV Station". Since 1987, Tokai TV hosts Tokai TV Festival (東海テレビまつり) activities. On the 40th anniversary of the first broadcast, the Tokai TV Festival was held for two days on November 21 and 22 1998, attracting more than 34,000 people. Tokai TV also established the Tokyo Production Department in 1999 to strengthen its production capabilities in Tokyo.

=== 2000–2010 ===
With the appearance of well known figure skaters in Nagoya, Tokai TV has held many figure skating events since 2000, contributing to the popularization of figure skating in Japan. On December 1, 2003, on the occasion of the 45th anniversary of broadcasting and a move to new headquarters, Tokai TV began to broadcast digital TV. On November 1, Tokai TV broadcast a 7-hour and 30-minute special program with the theme of "Challenge" to commemorate the 45th anniversary of the broadcast. In 2004, Tokai TV once again won the triple crown in ratings after 7 years. During the 2005 Aichi World Expo, Tokai TV set up an exhibition hall (Yumemiruyama/梦みる山) with Chunichi Shimbun, Central Nippon Broadcasting, and other companies to showcase the latest imaging technology. On the 50th anniversary of broadcasting in 2008, Tokai TV held the Tokai TV Thanksgiving Festival from November 1 to 3. The Nagoya TV Tower in Hisaya Odori Park was used as the venue, attracting 370,000 people.

=== 2011–present: End of analog broadcasting ===
On July 24, 2011, Tokai TV ceased analog TV broadcasting. However, the "Mr. Cesium" incident (see below) occurred the following month, which seriously damaged its credibility. At the same time, due to the sluggish ratings of Fuji TV, Tokai TV ratings also fell. In 2018, on the occasion of the 60th anniversary of its launch, Tokai TV produced a special program Goodbye, TV, exposing the difficulties faced by its news department, which had repercussions in the TV industry. This documentary was later adapted into a movie. In 2020, Tokai TV and three other private TV stations in Nagoya (CBC TV, Chukyo TV and TV Aichi) jointly created the on-demand video service Locipo.

== Mascots ==
Since 1997, the eve of the 40th anniversary of broadcasting, Tokai TV has launched a new mascot every 10 years. In 1997, the mascot "ヤッパくん" was an alien who liked to watch their programs. In 2008, Tokai TV launched a new mascot "わんだほ", whose appearance was based on clouds. The basic shape is the channel number "1" of Tokai TV Station, but can be deformed into other shapes. In 2018, the mascot was Icchy (イッチー), a little fairy from the flower fields in Tokai, which looks like a yellow bear.

== Programming ==
=== News ===
Tokai TV's first news program hosted by a host was News Corner (ニュースコーナー) which started broadcasting in 1961. In 1963, Tokai TV held the first court live broadcast in Japanese TV history. In 1965, Tokai TV Station began to broadcast a 30-minute large-scale news program Chunichi TV News Sunday Evening Edition on Sunday. In order to strengthen the news reporting system, the news departments of Tokai TV and Tokai Radio were integrated in 1967. When the Hidagawa bus crashed in 1968, Tokai TV broadcast the accident report at 7:45 in the morning, and was commended by Fuji News Network. In the early 1970s, Tokai TV produced a series of news special programs about Yokkaichi asthma, which won the Galaxy Award and other awards. During the hijacking of Japan Airlines Flight 124 in 1974, THK broadcast a special program that lasted more than seven hours, significantly longer than other private TV stations. Beginning in 1978, Tokai TV broadcast a large-scale strip news program Evening News 630 from Monday to Friday evening, making the weekday news programs also large-scale. In the following year a dedicated news studio was opened to strengthen the ability to produce news programs. When Emperor Showa died in 1989, Tokai TV aired a special program that lasted 42 hours and 2 minutes. When China Airlines Flight 140 crashed in 1994, Tokai TV was able to report the news quickly because it had a live weather video camera at Nagoya Airport. It broadcast a flash report at 20:26, ahead of other stations, and started broadcasting at 20:39. The station produced a special program and devoted as many as 347 employees to report on the accident.

In 1991, Tokai TV opened its first overseas branch, the FNN Vienna branch, broadcasting news from all over Europe centered on Eastern Europe. In 1997, the station closed the Vienna branch and opened the FNN Jakarta branch to strengthen news reports in Southeast Asia. In 2003, Tokai TV opened the FNN Beijing branch.

=== TV series ===
The first TV series produced by Tokai TV was the satirical comedy Ganbare Your Excellency. In 1960, THK began to broadcast the theater of Famous Water Yaozuo, and it was successfully sold to Mainichi Broadcasting. In May 1964, Tokai TV broadcast the first work of its most famous TV series Noon Series, Snow Burning, which increased the noon ratings. The fifth episode of the noon series The Worry of This World set a record with an average audience rating of 20% in Nagoya area; the average audience rating of the tenth episode The Sun of Love even exceeded 30%. In order to facilitate the appearance of top line actors, the series was re-produced in Tokyo in 1969. Beginning in April 1976, the length of the midday series was extended from 15 to 30 minutes. The noon series No Ambition, which began broadcasting in October the same year, had an average audience rating of 15.3% in Nagoya. Due to its wide acclaim, it was repeatedly extended, and finally aired as many as 210 episodes. In 1986, the midday series The Arashi of Love was serialized due to its great success, and then the sister works Hana no Arashi and Natsu no Arashi were broadcast, and a remake was carried out in 2002. Koharu in 1996 took place in a hot spring hotel in Ishikawa Prefecture, and it was a popular series that produced as many as six parts. In 2002, Tokai TV adapted Kikuchi Kan's famous novel Mrs. Pearl into a midday series, which caused a social phenomenon. The term "Mrs. Pearl" was selected as the top 10 in the New Words and Buzzwords Awards of the year. Peony and Rose in 2004 is considered to be the pinnacle work of the love-hate route of the noon series. From 2015 to 2016, Peony and Rose was remade as well. However, due to changes in the audience's living habits, Tokai TV's noon series aired the last work Lam's Tears~We Have Tomorrow~ in March 2016. At the same time that the noon series ended, Tokai TV set up six new adult dramas on Saturday night, and continued to provide series for the Fuji TV network. Compared with the mid-day dramas that mainly focus on love-hate dramas, the six dramas of adults are late-night dramas, with more diverse themes.

Music Calendar (ミュージックカレンダー), which began broadcasting in 1967, is a long-lived program that has been broadcast for 10 years. It has also been successfully broadcast on other members of the network such as Fuji TV. This program was also Tokai TV's first self-made color program. After the establishment of the Tokyo production department, the production capacity for variety shows has been significantly improved. The production of Age Difference Showdown! (年の差バトル! 言い分 vs Eぶん!!) has achieved more than 10% ratings. Sun's House, which began broadcasting in 2003, is hosted by Tomomitsu Yamaguchi. It is a long-lived program, having been broadcast for more than 17 years with at least 800 episodes.

=== Informational programs and documentaries ===
In 1961, Tokai TV produced the housewife's information program Hello, Madam (Ou-様こんにちは) for the first time, broadcast from Monday to Friday. The name of the program Housewife Information Your Two Points (奥様信息あなたの2时です), which began broadcasting in 1971, came from an audience poll. It gave various practical information for housewives and established the foundation of Tokai TV's local information programs. Today Tokai, which began broadcasting in 1974, is a housewife-oriented program that incorporates news color, and it is broadcast every Monday to Friday evening. In 1998, Tokai TV became the first private TV station to broadcast 6 editions a week of live strip local information program with P-can TV. In 2006, Tokai TV began broadcasting the information program Style Plus on Sundays, making THK broadcast local information programs every day. Now Tokai TV broadcasts the strip information program Switch in the morning period from Monday to Friday, and Mr. Taichi!, hosted by Kokubun Taichi, at noon on Sunday.

Hometown Journey, which began broadcasting in 1963, visited the settings of literary works all over Japan. It has been broadcast for 44 years and has a total of 2,279 episodes. The program was not only sold and broadcast overseas, but also obtained material from China in 1982. In 1975, Tokai TV's documentary Showa 49 Spring Osawa Village won the Art Festival Grand Prize, and was the first work of Tokai TV to do so. In 1982, Tokai TV became the first western TV station to be allowed to cover the Baikal-Amur railway. The documentary The Disappearing Village (消える村), recording the changes in the lives of residents in the flooded area of Tokuyama Reservoir, was affirmed by the 25th Anniversary Special Award of the Galaxy Awards. In 1990, the documentary film tracking a 10,000-yen banknote (SY660000H) produced by Tokai TV won the Excellence Award in the TV Entertainment Department of the People's Liberation Association. The 2003 documentary Papa is Edison (とうちゃんはエジソン) about Kato Yuanzhong won the Galaxy Award and the FNS Documentary Award this year. It was the first time that Tokai TV won the Galaxy Award Grand Prize.

== Criticism and controversy ==
=== Mr. Cesium incident ===
On August 4, 2011, during the "Happy Shopping" segment in Tokai TV's program Bessatsu! P-Can TV (Bessatsu! ぴーかんテレビ), Inaniwa udon noodles from Akita Prefecture were advertised. Suddenly, the announcement screen for the winner of the Love Rice at First Sight Produced in Iwate Prefecture appeared, having nothing to do with the contents of the show. The winners' names were written as "怪しいお米セシウムさん" (lit. "suspicious rice Mr. Cesium") and "汚染されたお米セシウムさん" (lit. "contaminated rice Mr. Cesium"). The screen was shown for 23 seconds. After returning to the studio, the host of Bessatsu! P-Can TV and Tokai TV host Tomoyuki Fukushima quickly apologized. Afterwards, according to an investigation by the channel, the cause of the incident was that the subtitle producers accidentally broadcast the subtitle screen for practice. Because this incident happened about five months after the Fukushima Daiichi nuclear power plant accident and cesium is a radioactive pollutant, it caused a public outcry.

After the incident, Tokai TV received a large number of calls and emails from viewers to protest. Iwate Governor Tatsumoto also protested against Tokai TV on behalf of the Iwate government. The Japan Commercial Broadcasters Union issued a serious warning in writing to Tokai TV for this incident. After the incident, Tokai TV stopped broadcasting the program. Then president Shuo Asano also publicly apologized on TV and to the Iwate Prefectural Government. Tokai TV also set up a countermeasure headquarters to comprehensively verify the cause of the accident and prevent similar incidents from happening again. On August 30, Tokai TV broadcast a one-hour report, explaining the cause of the incident, and apologized to the audience and agricultural workers in Iwate Prefecture. After the incident, Tokai Television also established a regeneration committee to rebuild broadcasting ethics and launch activities to support the Tohoku region.

== See also ==
- Tokai Radio Broadcasting
