= Festivals in Nagoya =

There are many festivals held in the city of Nagoya in central Japan. These festivals (matsuri) take place throughout the year. Apart from the main national festivals and holidays, which are celebrated across the entire country, Nagoya has its own unique festivals. Major events include the Atsuta Festival at Atsuta Shrine in June, the Port Festival at Nagoya Port in July, the Nagoya Castle Summer Festival in August, and the Nagoya Festival at the Hisaya Ōdori Park in October. Various smaller festivals exist, and different wards and areas of the city have their own local festivals.

== Events and festivals ==
=== January ===
- Coming of Age Day (成人の日, Seijin no Hi) is a Japanese holiday held annually on the second Monday of January. It is held in order to congratulate and encourage all those who have reached the age of majority—20 years old (二十歳, hatachi)—over the past year, and to help them realize that they have become adults. Festivities include coming of age ceremonies (成人式, seijin-shiki) held at local halls and the Nagoya City Hall or the Aichi Prefectural Government Office, as well as after-parties amongst family and friends.

=== March ===
- Hinamatsuri (雛祭り, Doll Festival), or Girls' Day, is held on March 3. Platforms covered with red carpet are used to display a set of ornamental dolls (雛人形, hina-ningyō) representing the Emperor, Empress, attendants, and musicians in traditional court dress of the Heian period. Doll makers from Nagoya continue to be one of the most outstanding ones in Japan.

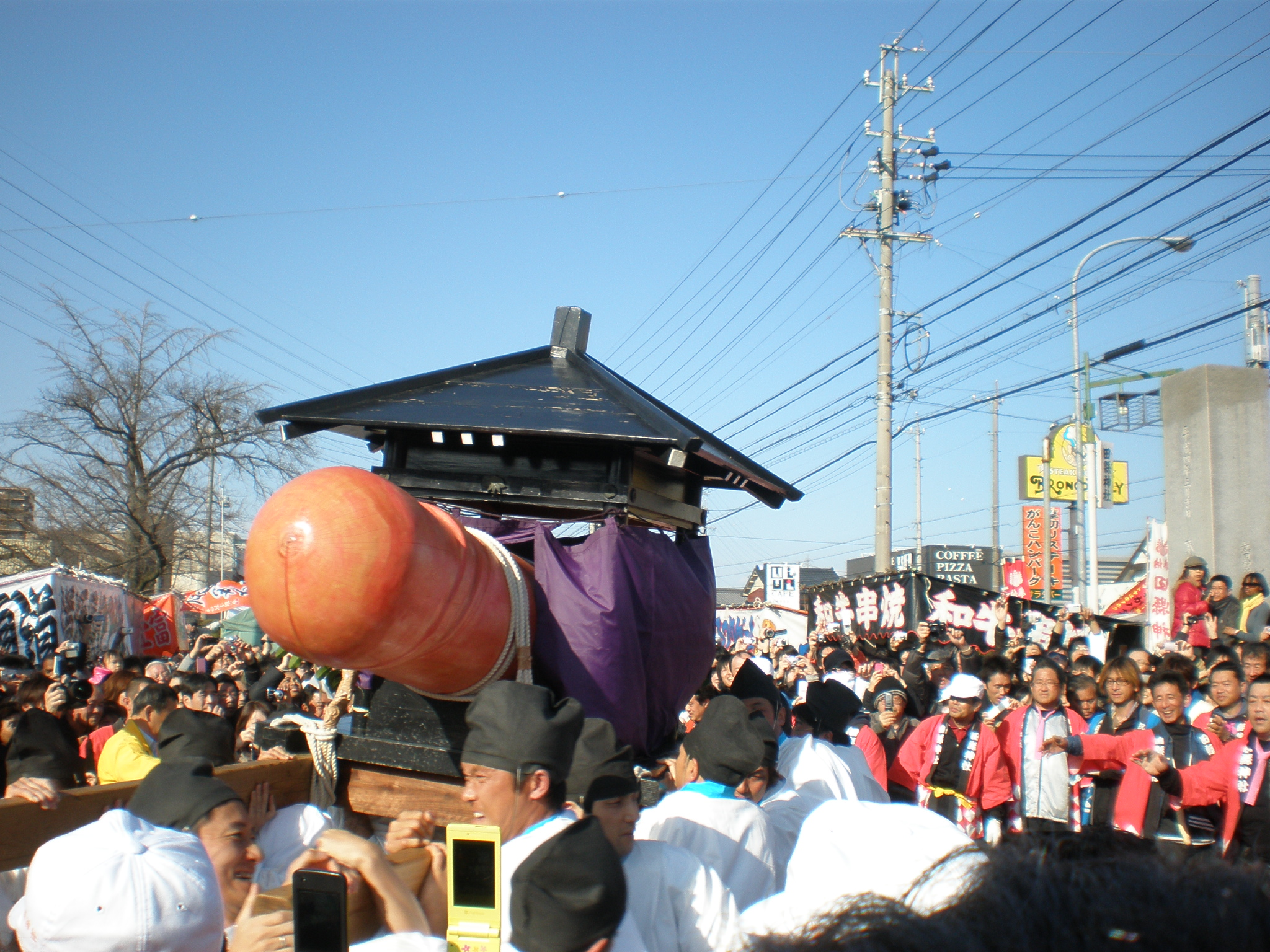
Hōnen Matsuri at Tagata Shrine in Komaki

- Hōnen Matsuri (豊年祭, Harvest Festival) is a fertility festival celebrated every year on March 15 at Tagata Shrine in Komaki, just north of Nagoya. Hōnen means "prosperous year" in Japanese, implying a rich harvest, while a matsuri is a festival. The Hōnen festival and ceremony celebrate the blessings of a bountiful harvest and all manner of prosperity and fertility. The festival's main features are Shinto priests playing musical instruments, a parade of ceremonially garbed participants, all-you-can-drink sake (wine), and a 280 kg (620 lb), 2.5-meter-long (98 in) wooden phallus.

=== April ===
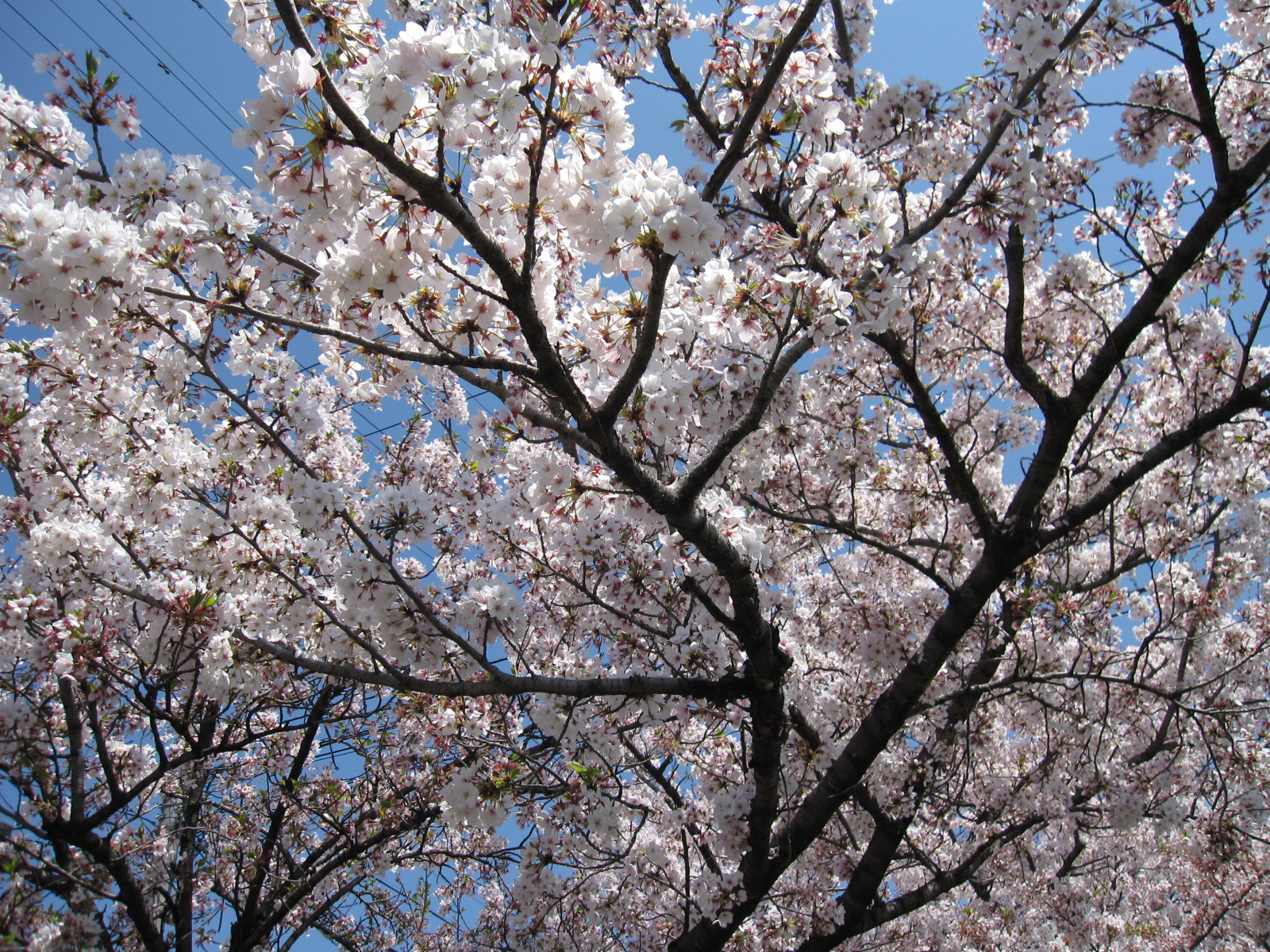
Cherry blossoms in Hara, Tenpaku-ku

- Hanami (花見; lit. "flower viewing") is the traditional custom of enjoying the beauty of flowers, "flower" in this case almost always meaning cherry blossoms or ume blossoms. Sakura season in Nagoya tends to be from March to April. Hanami mostly consists of having an outdoor party beneath the sakura during daytime or at night in places such as Meijō Park, Nagoya Agricultural Center, and Nagoya Castle.

=== May ===
- The Nagoya Walkathon and International Charity Festival is a foreign-organized charity event that started in 1991 and is held every May. The event is sponsored by the American Chamber of Commerce in Japan (ACCJ) and Nagoya International School (NIS), and its main purpose is to join the international community with Japanese friends and companies in raising money for local orphanages and charities.

=== June ===
- The Atsuta Festival is held on June 5 at the Atsuta Shrine. This is the biggest festival of the 70 festivals held at the shrine, and one of the calendar's most auspicious events. In the shrine's main sanctuary, religious rites are performed by the high priests while, within the greater compound, portable shrines (mikoshi) are carried, a martial arts contest is conducted, and performances by street entertainers are held. In the evening, vendors with paper lanterns on their wagons line the streets, and fireworks are set off in the sky.

=== July ===
- Tanabata (七夕, Evening of the seventh) is the star festival, originating from the Chinese Qixi Festival. It celebrates the meeting of Orihime (Vega) and Hikoboshi (Altair). According to legend, the Milky Way is a river of stars that crosses the sky, separating these lovers, and they are allowed to meet only once a year on the seventh day of the seventh lunar month of the lunisolar calendar. The celebration is held at night.
- The Marine Day Nagoya Port Festival is held at Nagoya Port around Marine Day (海の日, Umi no Hi), known as 'Ocean Day' or 'Sea Day,' celebrated on the third Monday each July. Many people take advantage of the holiday and summer weather to travel to a beach. The highlight of this annual festival is the raftsmen's water logging contest. Since the Edo period, the port has been the distribution centre for logs that were cut in the mountains and floated by raftsmen down the Hori River to port. Other attractions include a massive street dance with over 1,500 performers, a marching band, and large amounts of fireworks.
- The Nagoya Basho Sumo Tournament is the annual mid-July sumo wrestling tournament, held everyday from the second to the fourth Sunday at the Aichi Prefectural Gymnasium in the Ninomaru enceinte of Nagoya Castle.

=== August ===
- The Nagoya Castle Summer Festival is held early in August at Nagoya Castle. The festival starts after sunset, when the temperatures become cooler and more bearable for visitors. Vendors line the streets to watch the Bon Festival dance, listen to live music, watch Noh plays, and watch bonfires being lit.

=== September ===
- Chrysanthemum Day on September 9 is a celebration of the chrysanthemum, Japan's national flower. The tradition started in 910 CE, when the imperial court held its first chrysanthemum show. Various flower shows are held and popular historical scenes are depicted by clay dolls dressed in robes made from chrysanthemum petals.

=== October ===
- Nagoya Matsuri (名古屋祭, Nagoya Festival) is held in mid-October in the central Hisaya Ōdori Park in Sakae. The highlight of the festival is the procession of the Three Heroes of Nagoya: Oda Nobunaga, Toyotomi Hideyoshi, and Tokugawa Ieyasu. The characters come along with their soldiers clad in armour and carrying weapons and banners. The parade normally has over 700 people, stretching over 1.5 km in length, and is accompanied by a band.
- Ōsu Daidō-chōnin Matsuri (大須大道町人祭, Ōsu Street Performer's Festival) is held every year in October in the fashionable neighbourhood of Ōsu.
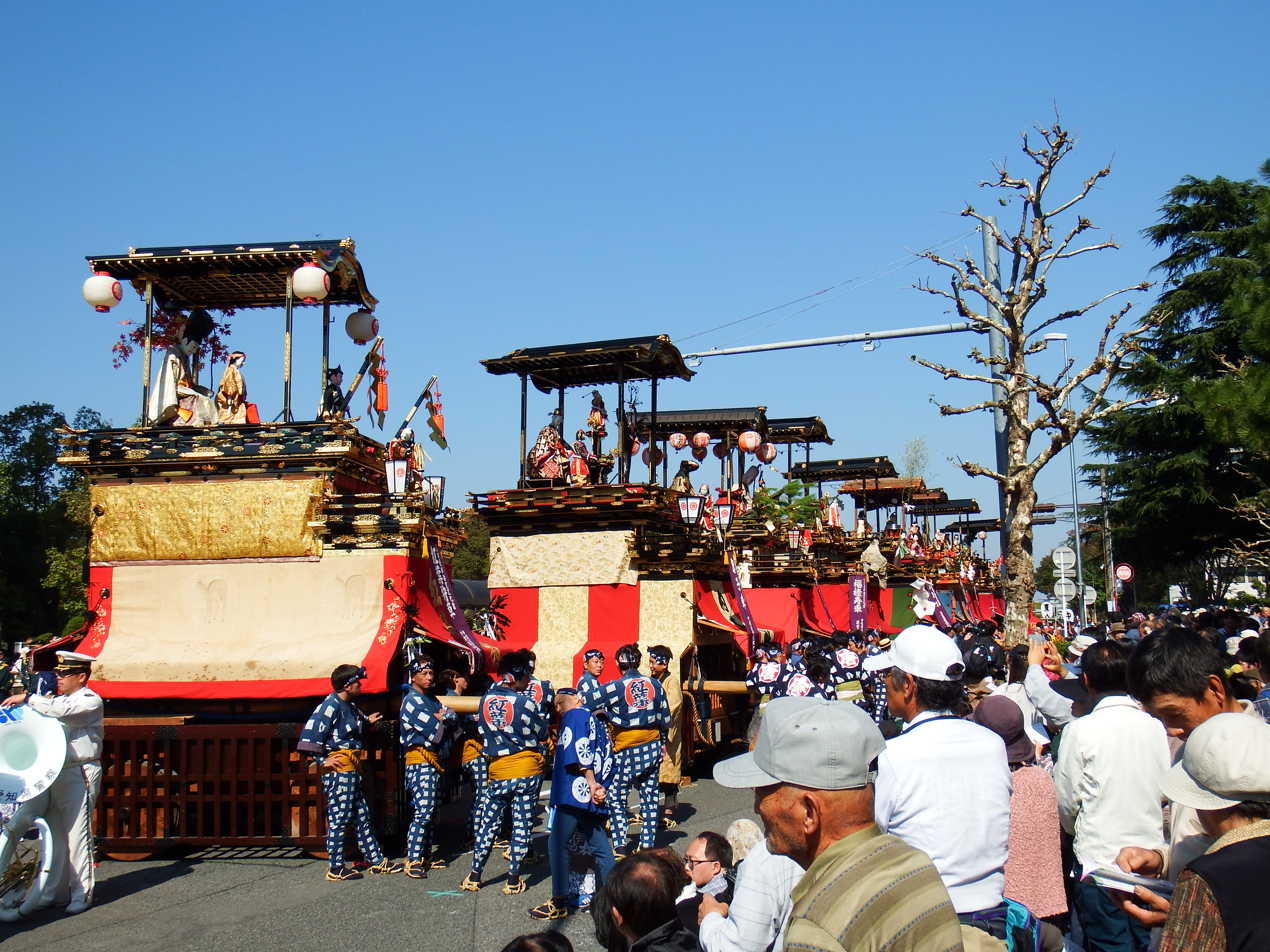
Karakuri float

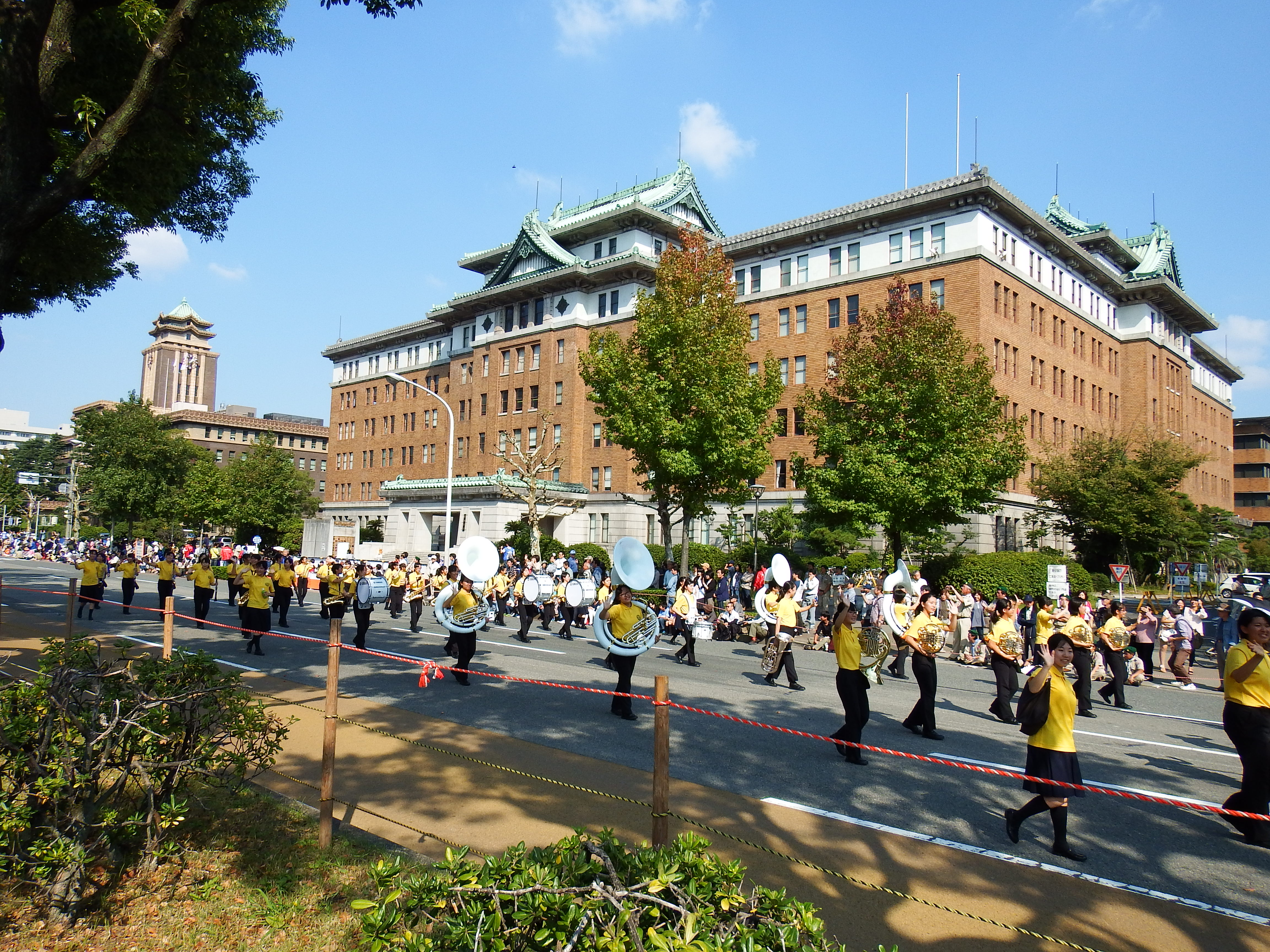
Band Parade

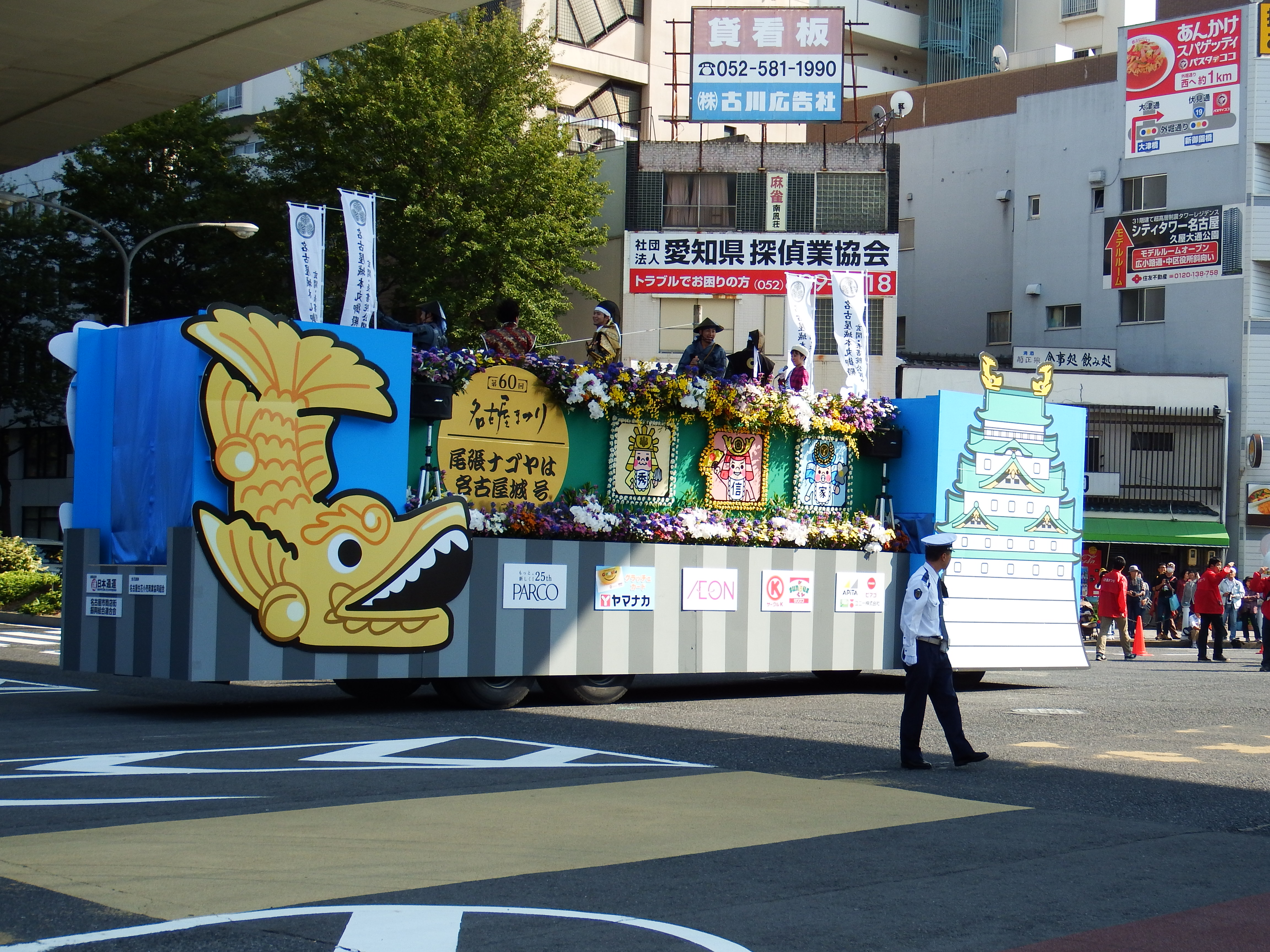
Flower Car Parade

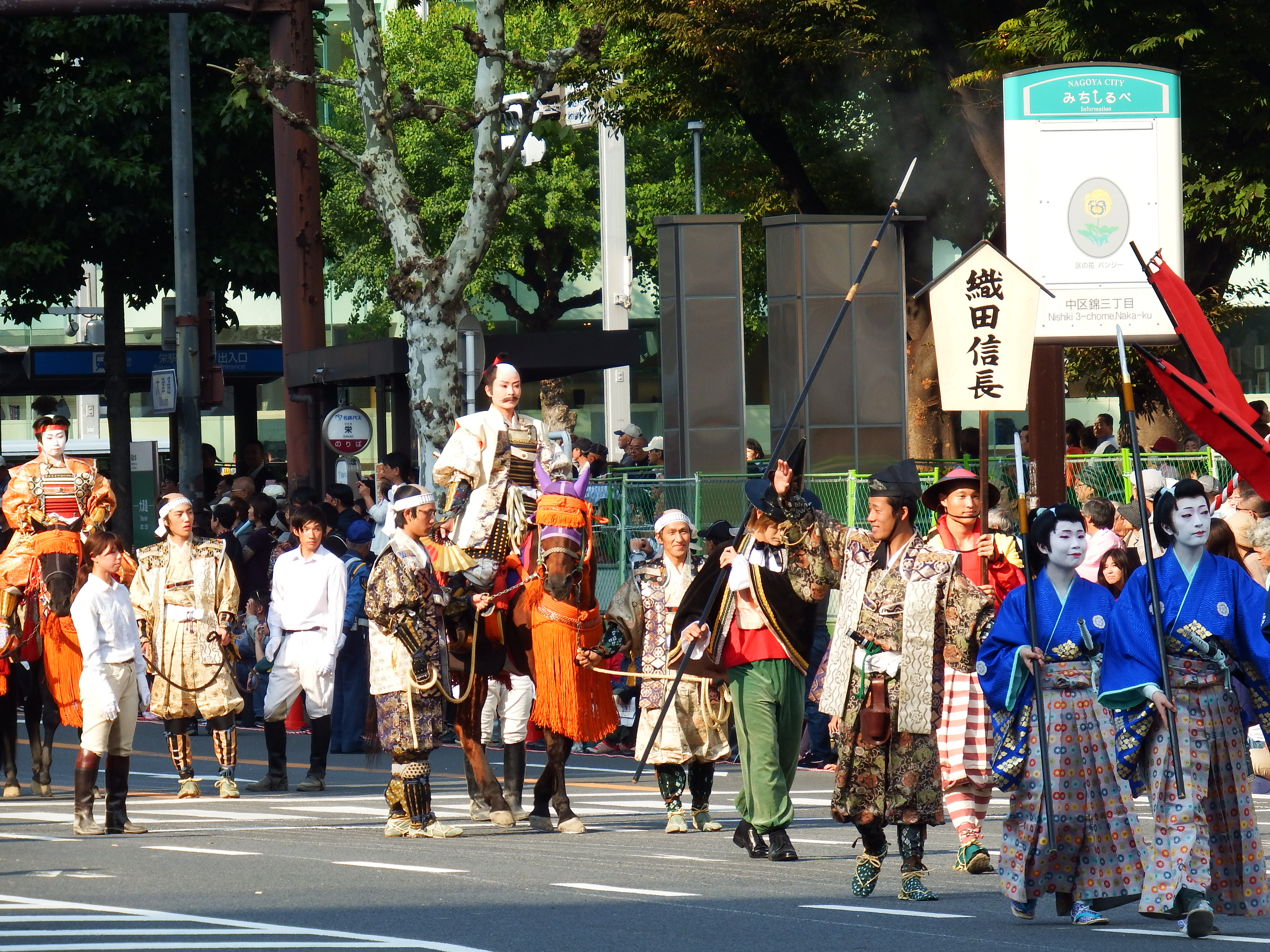
Oda Nobunaga（Procession of the Three Feudal Lords）

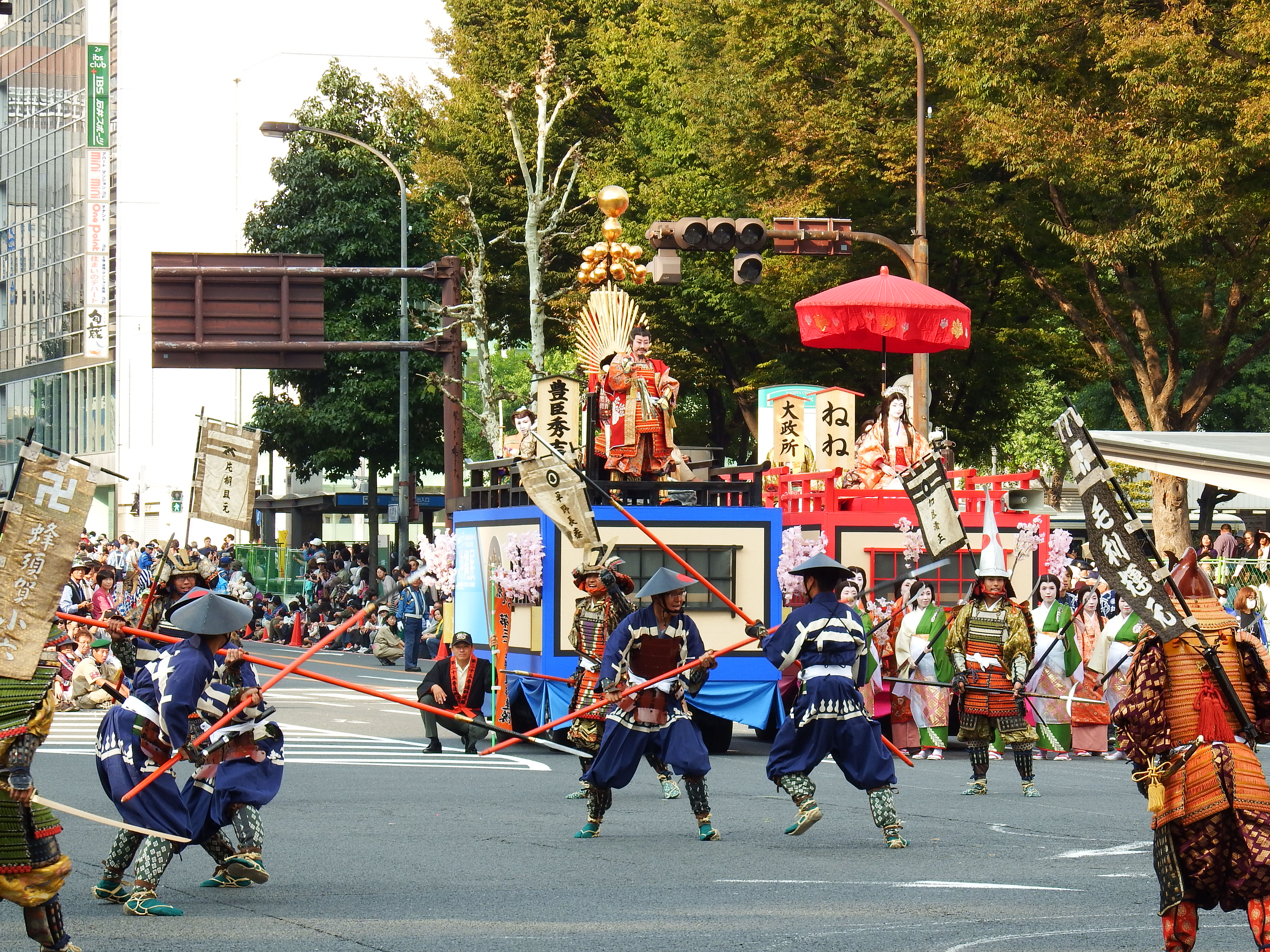
Toyotomi Hideyoshi

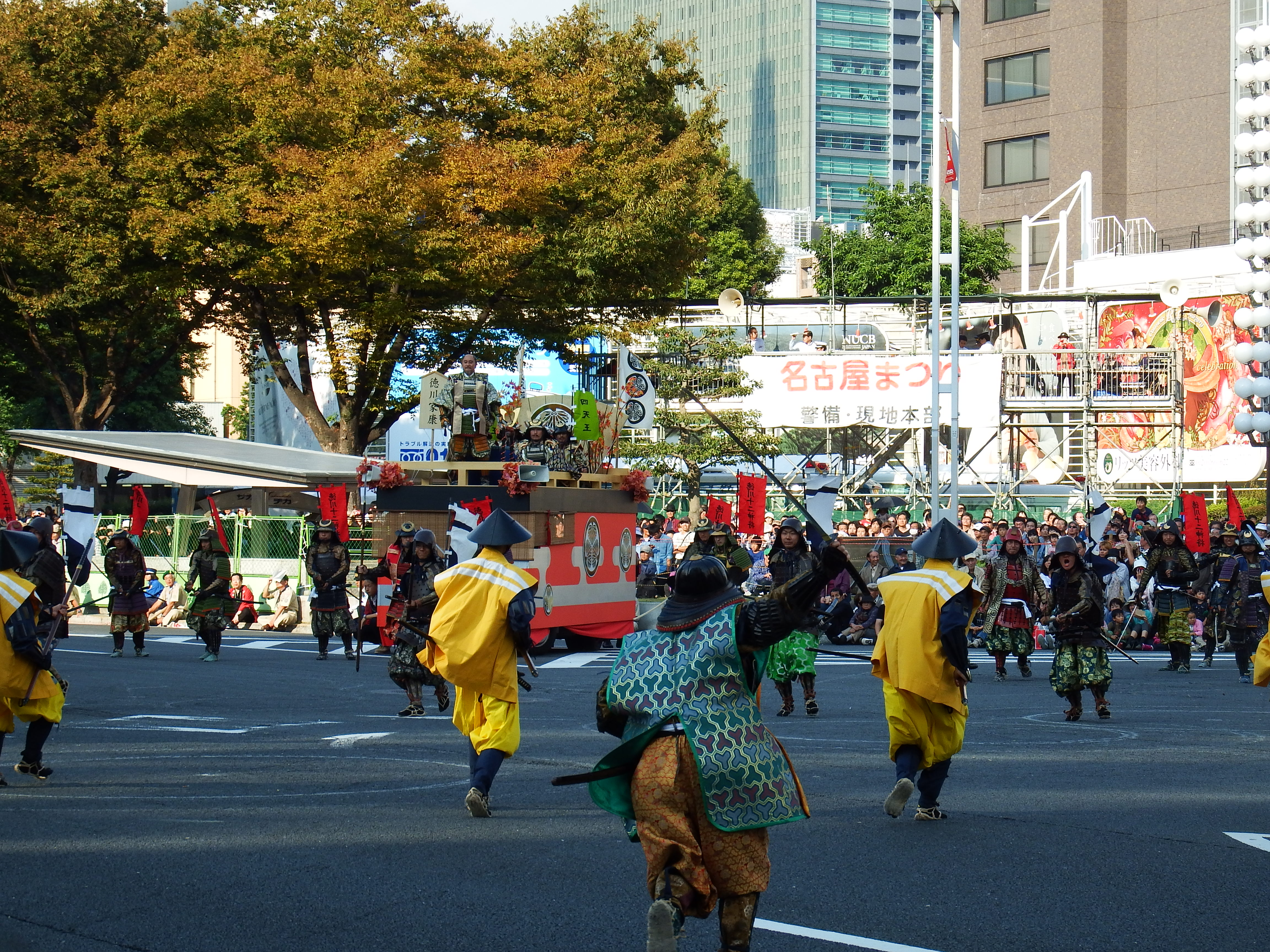
Tokugawa Ieyasu

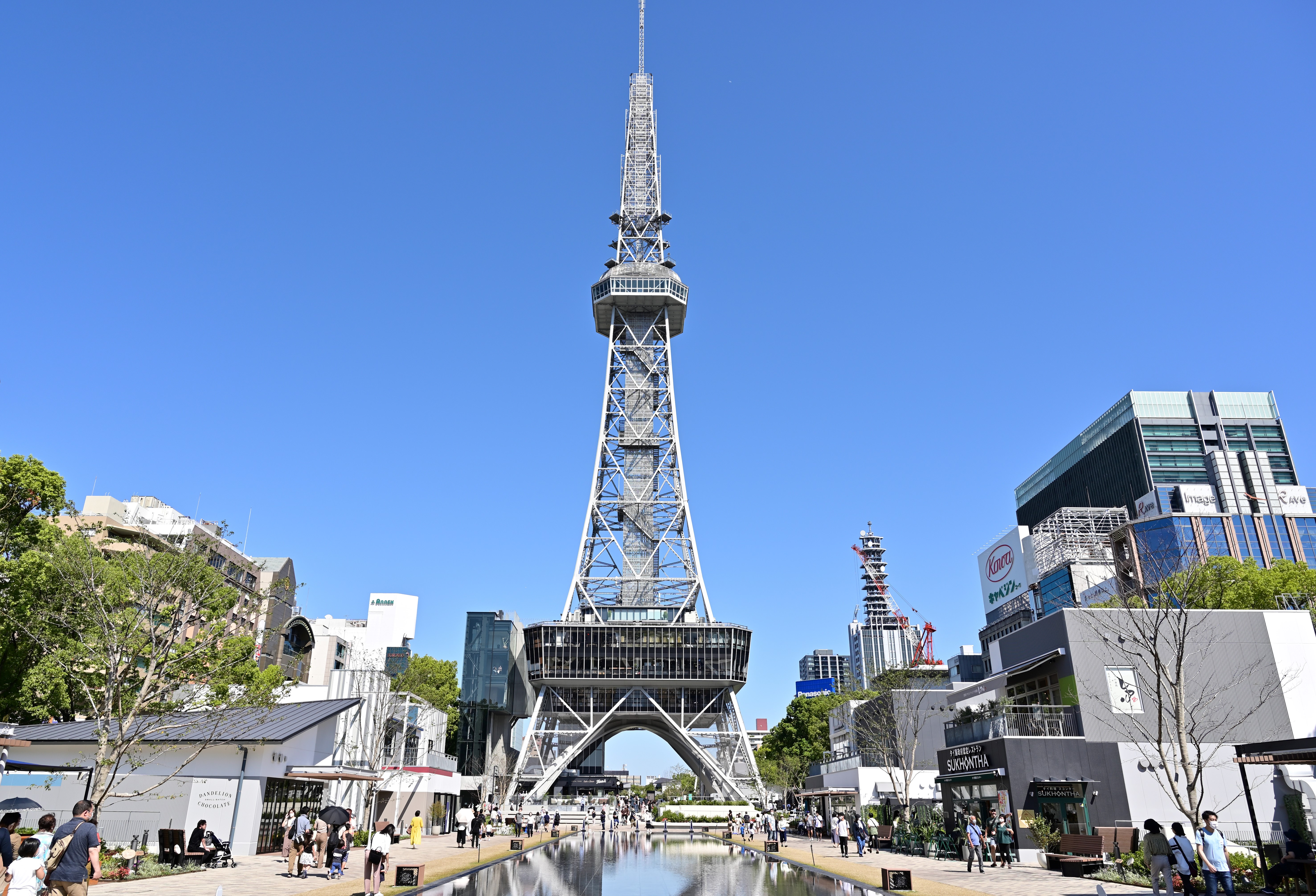
Hisaya Ōdori Park

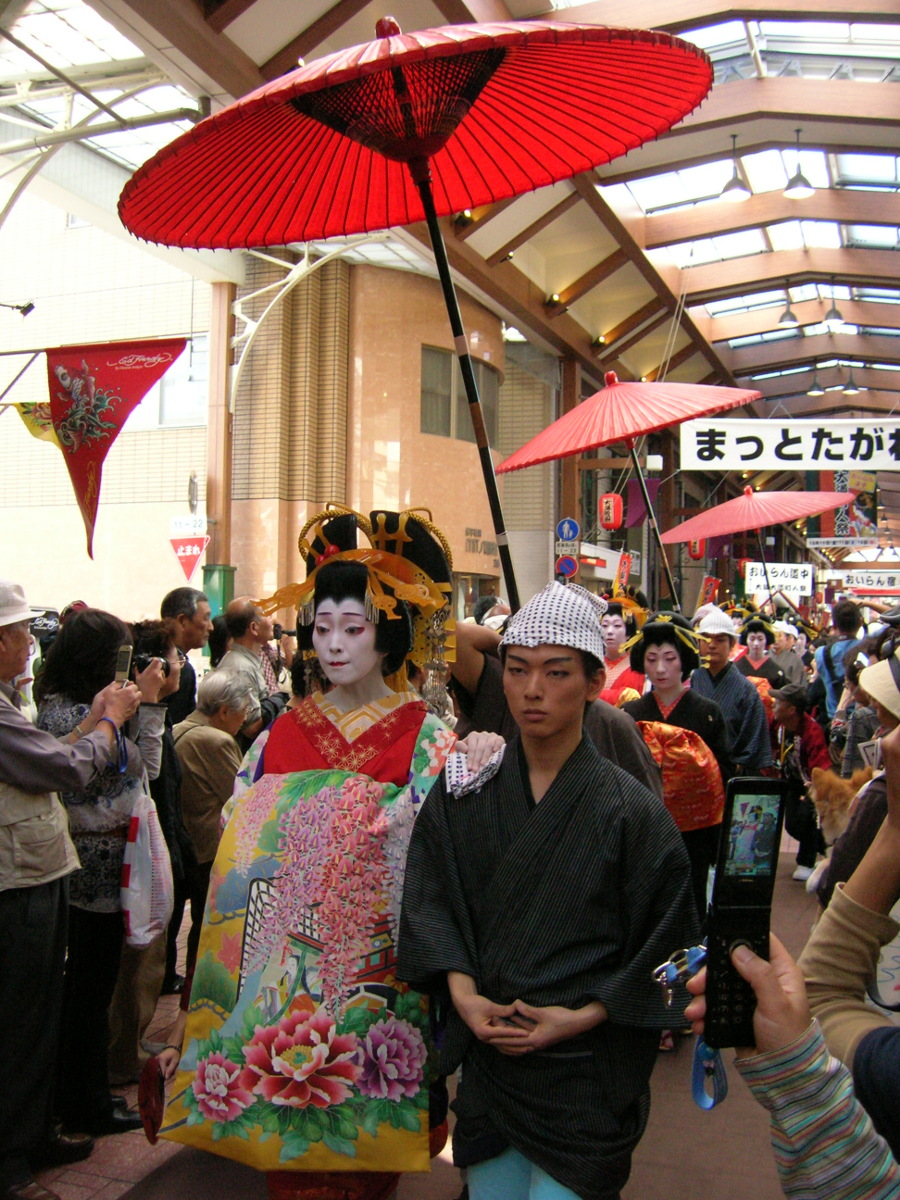
Daidō-chōnin Matsuri in Ōsu

=== November ===
- Shichi-Go-San (七五三; lit. "Seven-Five-Three") is a traditional rite of passage and festival day for three- and seven-year-old girls and three- and five-year-old boys, held annually on November 15. As Shichi-Go-San is not a national holiday, in practice it is generally observed on the nearest weekend. The children are brought to their local shrines for blessings.

=== December ===
- Ōmisoka (大晦日), or New Year's Eve, is the second-most important day in the Japanese calendar—it is the final day of the old year and the eve of New Year's Day, which is the most important day of the year. It is considered an important time for locals, who put great emphasis in shaking off the old evils and ushering in the new. Around 11:00 PM on Ōmisoka, people often gather at home for one last time in the old year to have a bowl of toshikoshi soba (年越しそば) or toshikoshi-udon (年越しうどん) together—a tradition based on people's association of eating the long noodles with “crossing over from one year to the next,” which is the meaning of toshi-koshi.

== See also ==
- Festivals in Tokyo
