= Nagoya Port Drawbridge =

Nagoya Port Drawbridge 名古屋港跳上橋
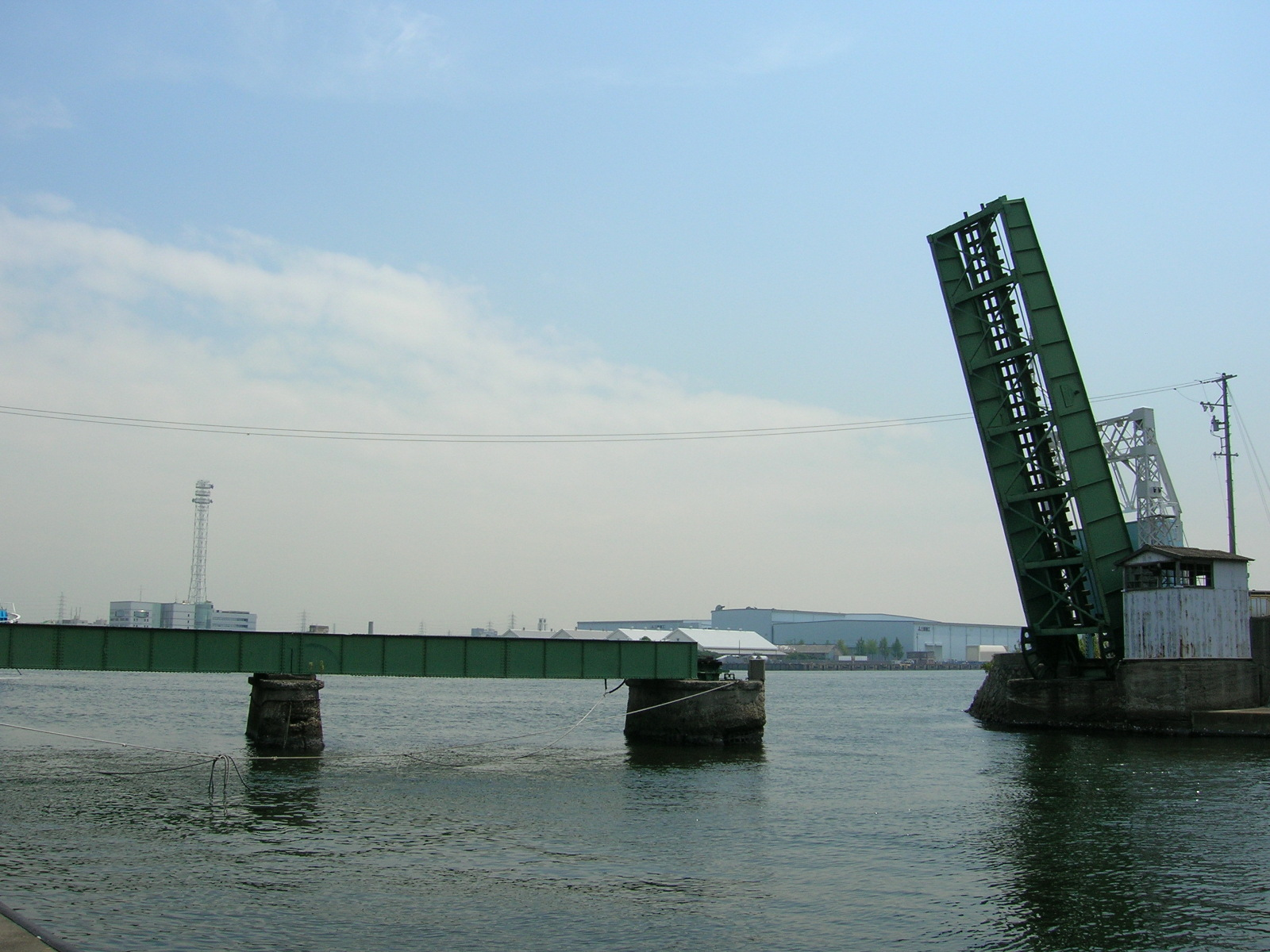
- Nagoya Port Drawbridge
- Coordinates: 35°05′36.92″N 136°53′15.62″E
- Carries: Rail
- Crosses: Nagoya Port
- Locale: Nagoya
- Owner: Nagoya Port Authority
- Heritage status: Tangible Cultural Properties of Japan; Heritage of Modern Industrialization

Characteristics
- Total length: 63.4 metres (208 ft)
- Width: 4.7 metres (15 ft)
- Longest span: 23.8 metres (78 ft)
- Load limit: 40 tonnes (44 short tons)

History
- Designer: Utarō Yamamoto
- Opened: June 20, 1927
- Closed: March 1986

Location
- Interactive map of Nagoya Port Drawbridge

The Nagoya Port Drawbridge (名古屋港跳上橋, nagoyakō haneagebashi) is a drawbridge in Nagoya Port in Nagoya, Japan.

== History ==
It was used on a rail line bound for Nagoya but has not been used since the rail line it belonged to was retired in March 1986, and now it remains up at all times. Completed in 1926 (100 years ago), it is the oldest drawbridge in Japan still in existence.

== Heritage Status ==
Since 1999, it has been a Registered Tangible Cultural Property of Japan of Japan, and it is also registered in Japan as an artifact of the Heritage of Modern Industrialization.
