= Isewan Terminal Service =

Shipping company based in Minato-ku, Nagoya, Japan

Isewan Terminal Service Co., Ltd.
- Company type: Public
- Traded as: NAG: 9359
- Industry: Shipping
- Founded: January 22, 1949
- Headquarters: Minato-ku, Nagoya, Japan
- Key people: Tadashi Ito, Chairman Shozo Goto, President
- Services: Shipping; Packing; Recycling; Warehousing
- Revenue: ¥38,685 million (2008)
- Number of employees: 834
- Website: www.isewan.co.jp/en/

Isewan Terminal Service (伊勢湾海運, Isewan kaiun)

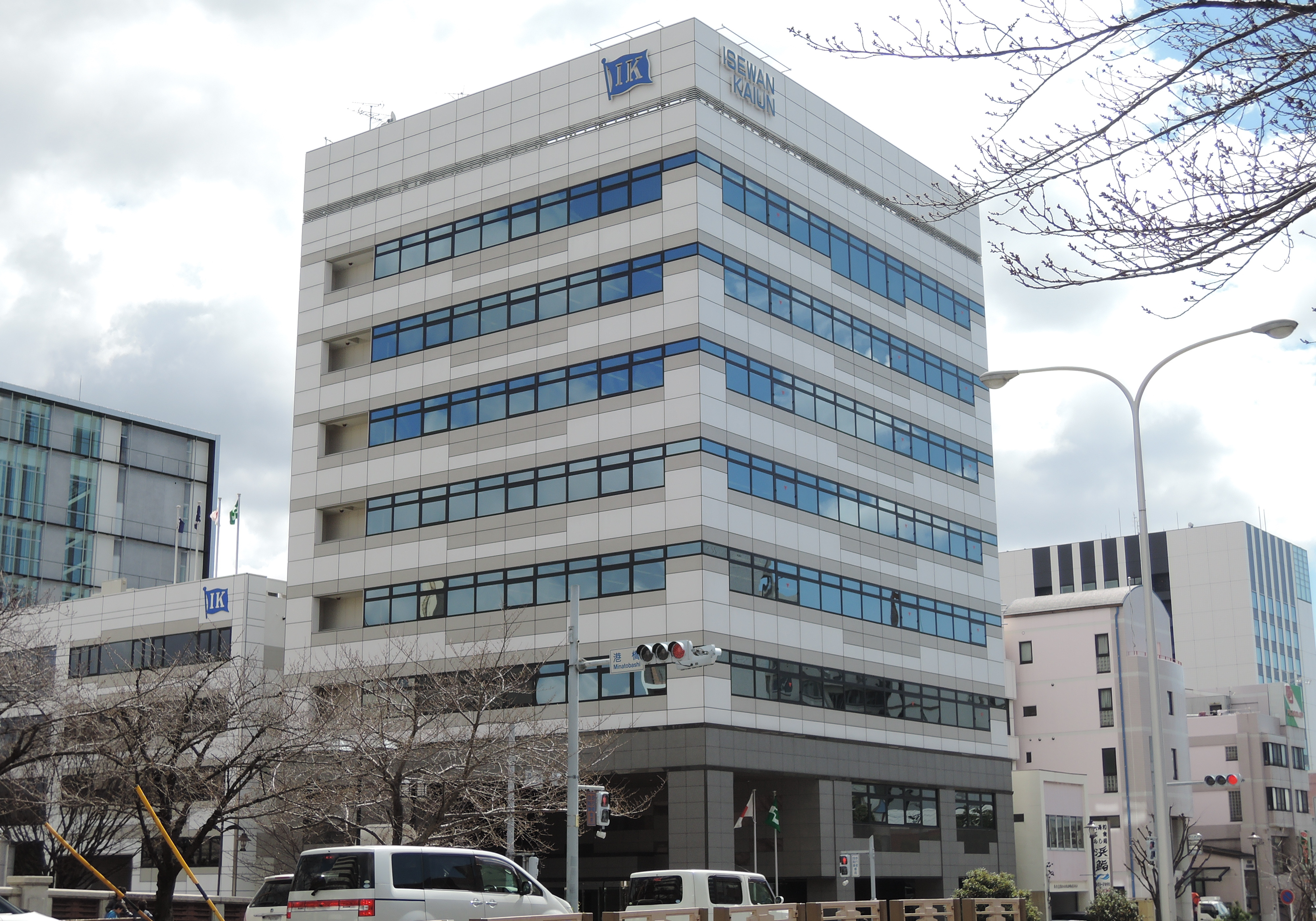

is a shipping company based in Minato-ku, Nagoya, Japan.

== Operations ==
Isewan Terminal Service is a major shipping company serving the Chūkyō Metropolitan Area, especially Nagoya Port and Central Japan International Airport, with foreign offices in The United States, China, Taiwan, Thailand, Indonesia, Mexico, Germany, Belgium and Russia. Their main operations are harbor transportation, but are also involved in the transportation-related fields of packing, recycling, and warehousing for large-scale cargo shipments by companies. Isewan means Ise Bay which is the bay in which the company bases its business.
