= Italia Mura =

Former shopping mall in Nagoya, Japan

Italia Mura 名古屋港イタリア村
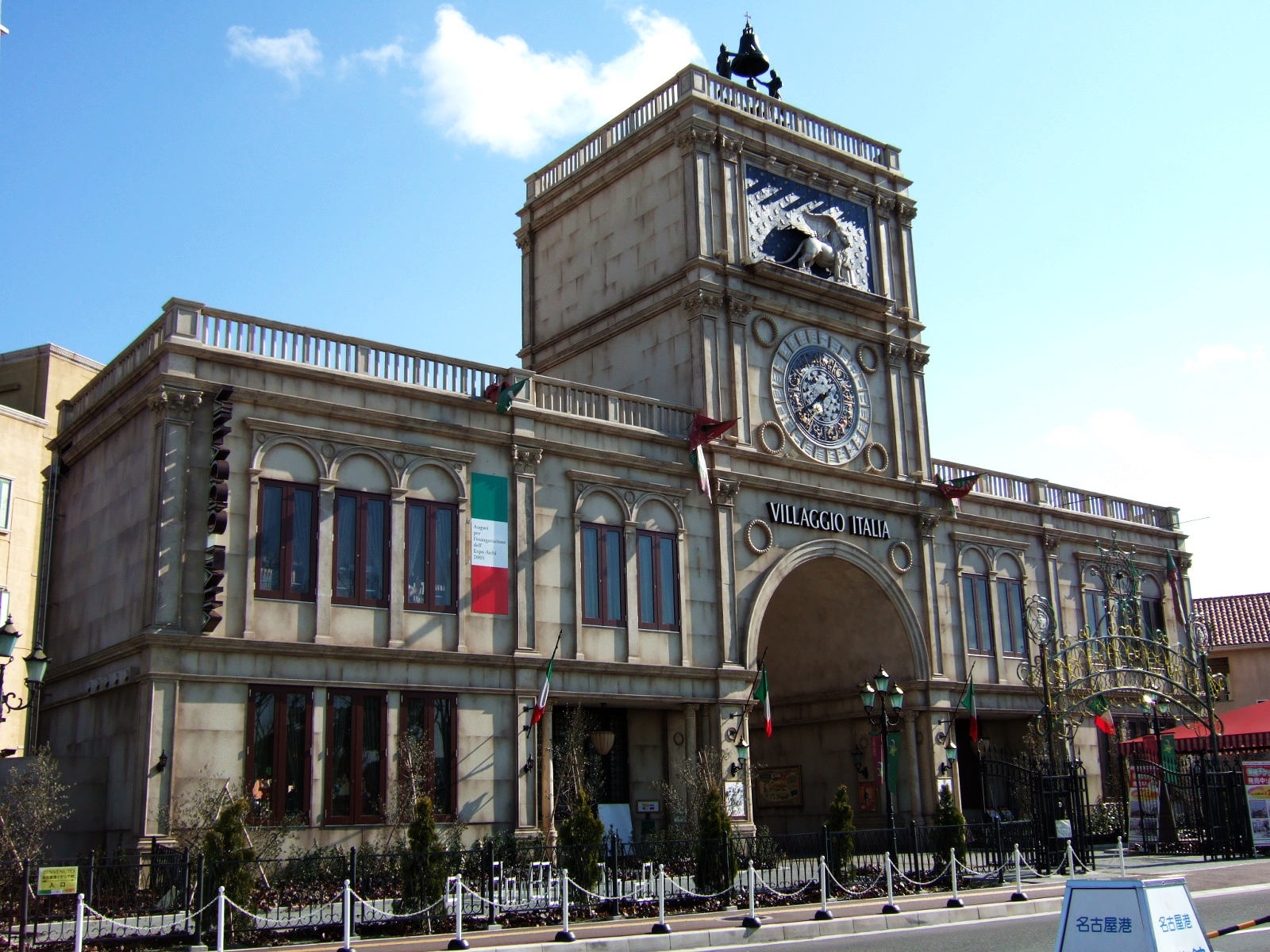
- Entrance to Italia Mura
- Interactive map of Italia Mura 名古屋港イタリア村
- Location: 1-15 Minato-ku, Nagoya, Aichi Prefecture, Japan
- Coordinates: 35°05′24.01″N 136°53′04.24″E
- Status: Defunct
- Opened: April 2, 2005
- Closed: May 7, 2008
- Owner: Nagoya Port Authority; Cest la vie Holdings
- Operated by: Nagoya Port Italia Mura KK
- Theme: Italy
- Attendance: 4.35 million (first year)
- Area: 31,000 square metres (7.7 acres)

Attractions
- Total: Horse-drawn carriage
- Water rides: Gondola
- Website: Official website; (archive)

Italia Mura (名古屋港イタリア村, Nagoya Kō Itaria Mura; lit. "Nagoya Port Italy Village") was a themed commercial complex operated within the Nagoya Port Garden area within Nagoya Port in Minato-ku, Nagoya, Aichi Prefecture, Japan. It consisted of theme park attractions such gondola and horse-drawn carriage rides as well as Italian-themed stores and restaurants. Italia Mura opened in April 2005, about a month before Nagoya established a sister city relationship with Turin.

Due to increasing debt, the facility closed in May 2008. The site was used by various businesses and as a cosplay backdrop until December 2014, when it was closed for demolition. Final demolition concluded in June 2015.

== History ==
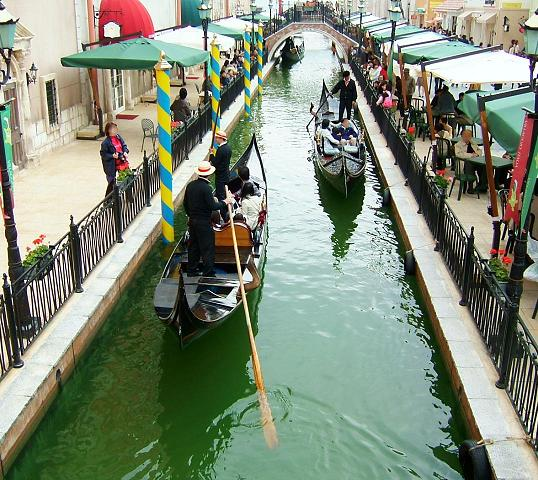
Sightseeing by gondola

Italia Mura opened on 2 April 2005 as a "convenient way for [Japanese] people to get a taste of something different". The park featured imported Italian gondolas operated by Italians on a replica of a Venice canal, a replica of St Mark's Campanile at the entrance to the park, a replica of Michelangelo's famous David statue, a replica of the Bocca della Verità, as well as 80 Italian themed restaurants and stores. The facility was about 31,000 square metres (7.7 acres) in size.

The park was developed by the Nagoya Port Authority and Cest la vie Holdings (株式会社セラヴィホールディングス, Kabushiki-gaisha Se Ra Vi Hōrudingusu), and was operated by Nagoya Port Italia Mura KK (名古屋港イタリア村株式会社, Nagoya Kō Itaria Mura Kabushiki-gaisha). During its first year of operation, it had 4.35 million visitors, more than twice the projected number. That same year, Nagoya established a sister city relationship with Turin.

In February 2008, Cest la vie failed to make a ¥100 million payment on a hot springs facility for Italia Mura, followed by the discovery of ¥100 million in unpaid taxes owed to the city of Nagoya. Additionally, the number of visitors had dwindled to less than half of those in the first year. The park filed for bankruptcy and closed in May of that year, and Cest la vie Holdings and two other subsidiaries filed for reorganization bankruptcy at the same time. The court filings for the bankruptcy protection indicated Italia Mura had about ¥17 billion in debt obligations, with the parent company and the other two subsidiaries having an additional ¥13 billion in debt. About 360 employees at Italia Mura were let go when it closed.

=== After closure ===
The day following the closure, the attorney appointed to oversee the bankruptcy assets announced that items from Italian Mura would be sold to the public at 50-90 percent off the retail price in order to get rid of inventory quickly and recover as much funding as possible to pay toward the outstanding debts. The expatriate Italians working at the facility had been hired on a 15-year contract and held a press conference expressing their frustration and anger over being fired when the park closed. At the time Italia Mura was closed, there were 18 Italians working at the park and living with their families in company housing. They stated they would be evicted at the end of May.

After the closure and bankruptcy filings, it was discovered that construction documents had been falsified, showing steel frame construction being used for the buildings when 14 of them were instead built with traditional wood framing. Various plans were made to use the facilities for other projects, but none of the plans were finalized and many of the buildings were demolished over the following years. Nagoya Port Authority announced the remaining buildings would be demolished in June 2015.

Beginning in May 2014, the former site of Italia Mura became known as a place for cosplayers to take photos because of the Italian architecture of the facilities. At least five cosplay photo events were held or planned at the site that year. The final event was planned for December 24, the day before the site was closed for demolition. Following the demolition, commercial developments were planned for the area to begin in March 2015. A request for redevelopment proposals was issued by the Nagoya Port Management Association in October 2014.

The former site of Italia Mura was used for PCR testing for COVID-19 in August 2020.
