= Port of Nagoya =

Port of Nagoya 名古屋港
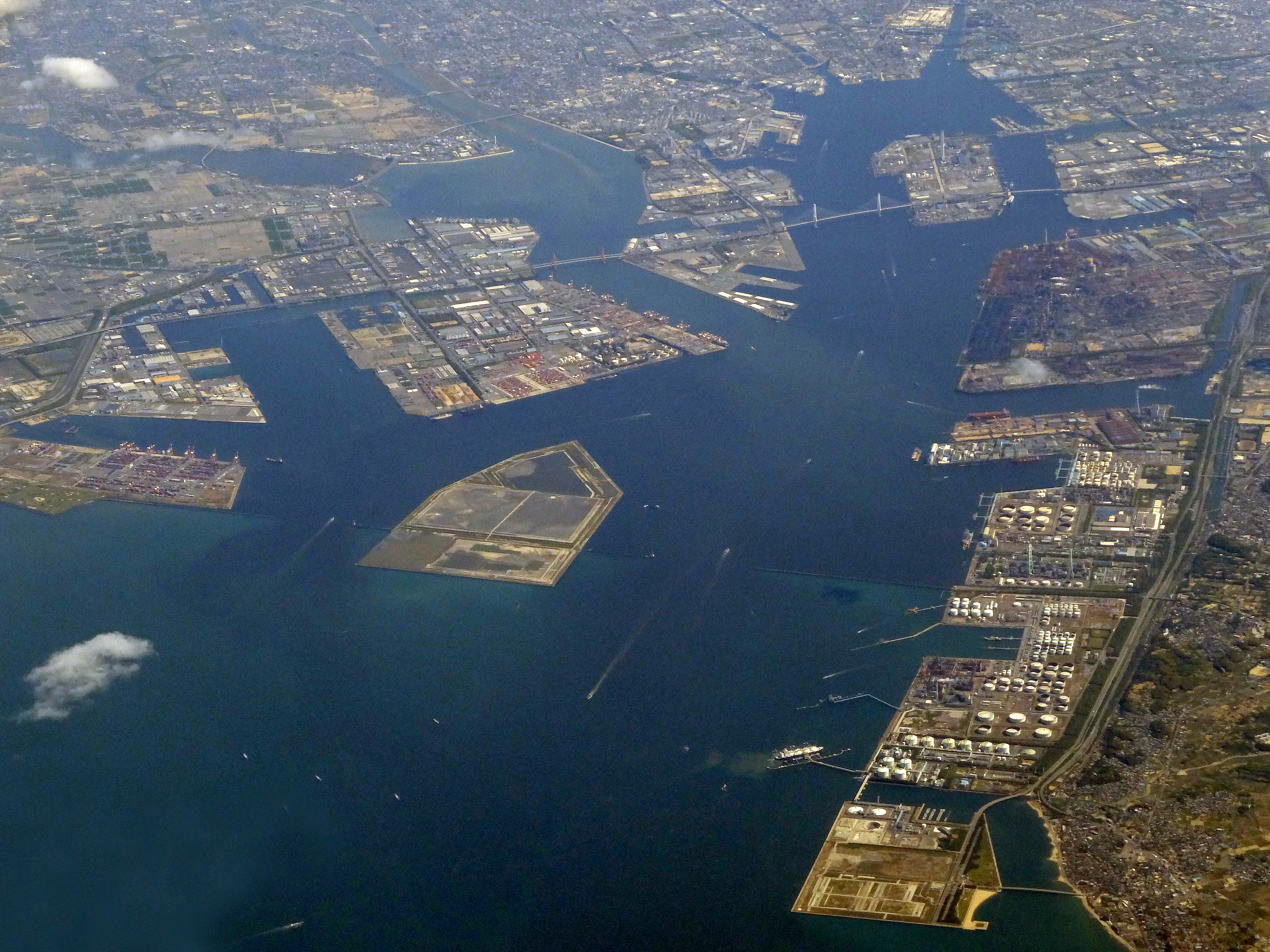
- Port of Nagoya
- Click on the map for a fullscreen view

Location
- Country: Japan
- Location: Ise Bay
- Coordinates: 35.08°N 136.88°E

Details
- Opened: November 10, 1907
- Operated by: Nagoya Port Authority
- Size of harbour: 82,279,000 square metres (885,640,000 sq ft)
- Land area: 42,133,000 square metres (453,520,000 sq ft)
- No. of berths: 290
- No. of piers: 21

Statistics
- Annual cargo tonnage: 165,000,000
- Annual container volume: 2,110,000
- Value of cargo: ¥16.7 trillion JPY (2009)
- Website www.port-of-nagoya.jp/english/

The Port of Nagoya (名古屋港, Nagoyakō), located in Ise Bay, is the largest and busiest trading port in Japan, accounting for about 10% of the total trade value of Japan. Notably, this port is the largest exporter of cars in Japan and where the Toyota Motor Corporation exports most of its cars. It has piers in Nagoya, Tōkai, Chita, Yatomi, and Tobishima.

Its mascots are Potan and Mitan.

According to Japanese media sources, Kodo-kai, a yakuza faction in the Yamaguchi-gumi group, earns large revenues by controlling the stevedoring and warehousing companies at the port.

== History ==
The Port of Nagoya opened for international trade in 1907.

=== Nagoya Port Authority ===
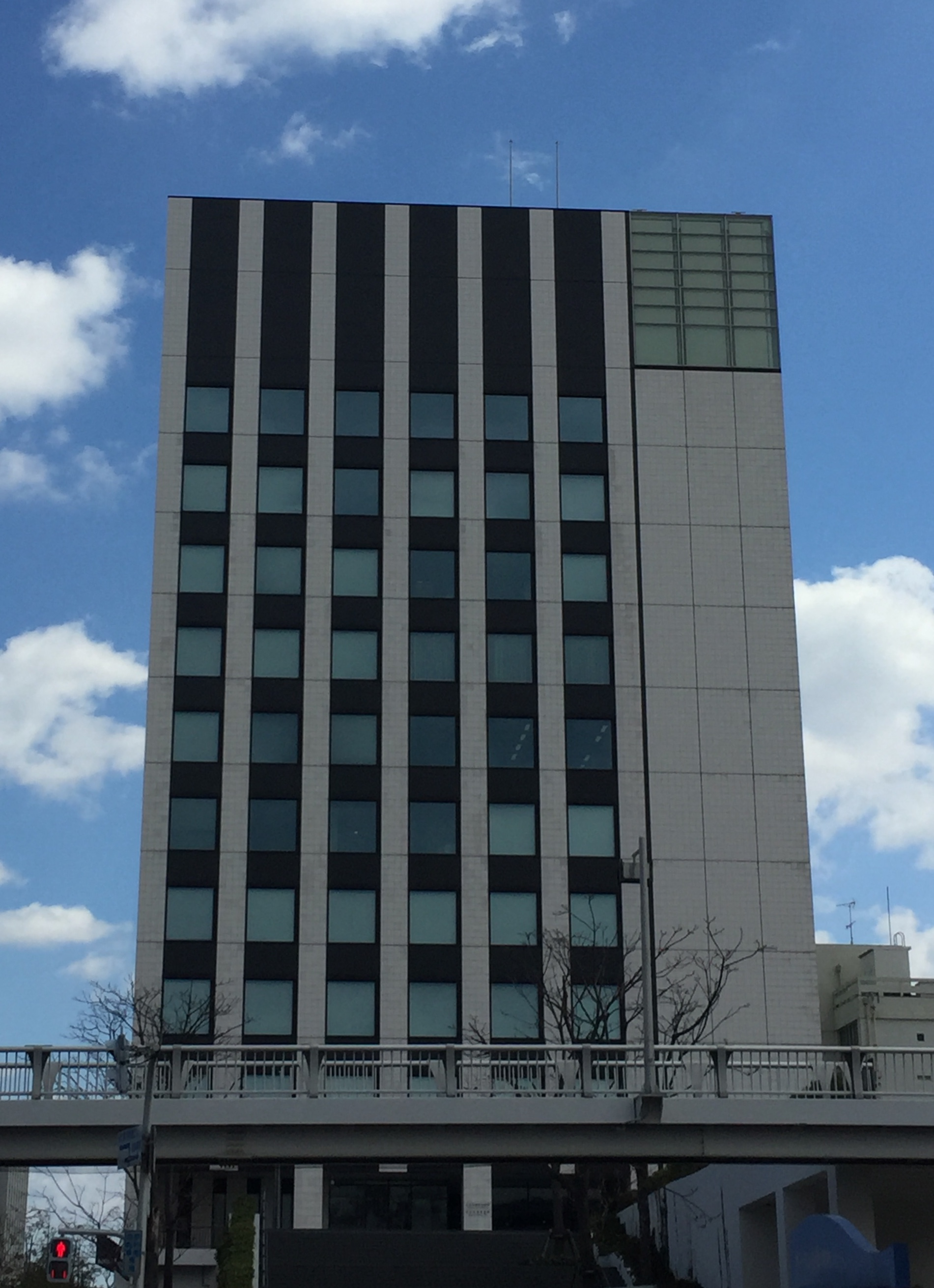
Headquarters of Nagoya Port Authority

The Nagoya Port Authority (名古屋港管理組合, Nagoyakō Kanri Kumiai) (NPA) was established on 8 September 1951 as a special local public entity that jointly operates the Port of Nagoya for the city of Nagoya and Aichi Prefecture. It has special district authority over the Port of Nagoya, which includes facilities in four different cities and one village.

The president of the NPA alternates every two years between the mayor of Nagoya and the governor of Aichi Prefecture. There are three vice presidents, including an executive vice president, as well as the vice governor of Aichi Prefecture and the vice mayor of Nagoya City. The treasurer of the prefecture acts as the treasurer of the NPA. There are also three auditors: one from the Nagoya Port Assembly, and one each from the city and the prefecture.

The NPA website was attacked via a DDoS attack by a Russian hacker group on 6 September 2022. On 7 December, the port renewed a 1988 agreement with the Port of Antwerp-Bruges, creating a "Sisterport/Partnership agreement". The port is the largest exporter of automobiles in Japan.

== Access ==
The Port of Nagoya is serviced by Nagoyakō Station on the Meikō Line of the Nagoya Municipal Subway, located northeast of the Port of Nagoya Public Aquarium and north of the port itself.

== Notable attractions and events ==
The port draws tourists from the Chūkyō Metropolitan Area as one of its primary tourist attractions. The main attraction is the Port of Nagoya Public Aquarium. Nearby is also an amusement park and the now-retired Antarctic survey ship Fuji which moors at the Port of Nagoya as a museum of the South Pole and its journeys there.

The Isewangan Expressway includes three bridges, collectively known as the Meikō Triton, which span the port.

Italia Mura was located at the port as part of the Nagoya Port Garden from 2005 until it was finally demolished in 2015. It was an Italy-themed facility with over 60 shops and restaurants, as well as a canal modeled after one in Venice.

== Sister ports ==
- Port of Los Angeles, United States (since 1959)
- Port of Fremantle, Australia, Australia (since 1983)
- Port of Baltimore, United States (since 1985)
- Port of Antwerp, Belgium (since 1988)
- Port of Shanghai, China (since 2003)
- Port of Sydney, Australia (since 2010)

== See also ==
- Aonami Line
- Isewan Terminal Service
- Nagoya Port Drawbridge
- List of East Asian ports
