= Nagoya Agricultural Center =

Park in Nagoya, Japan

Coordinates: 35°06′50.54″N 137°00′39.03″E

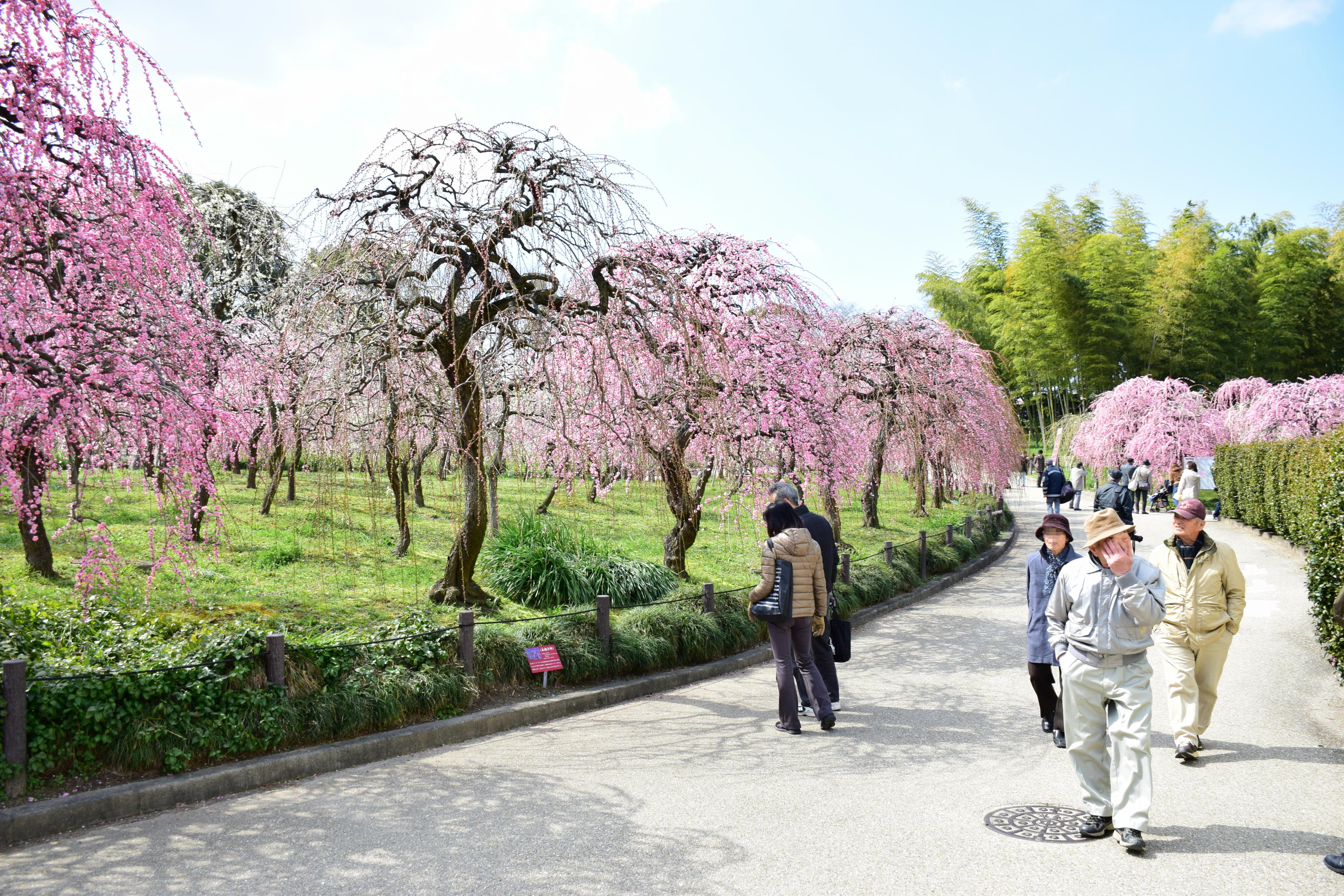
Nagoya Agricultural Center

The Nagoya Agricultural Center (名古屋市農業センター) is located in Tenpaku Ward in the city of Nagoya, central Japan.

The centre is free of charge, featuring a cafe and a shops that sells organic food such as vegetables and health foods. It also sells plants. It features glasshouses and a model farm with livestock.

The grounds are also used for picnics and sees peak visitor numbers during the plum and cherry blossom season in spring.

Access by public transport is a 15 minutes walk east from Hirabari Station on the Tsurumai Line.

== Gallery ==
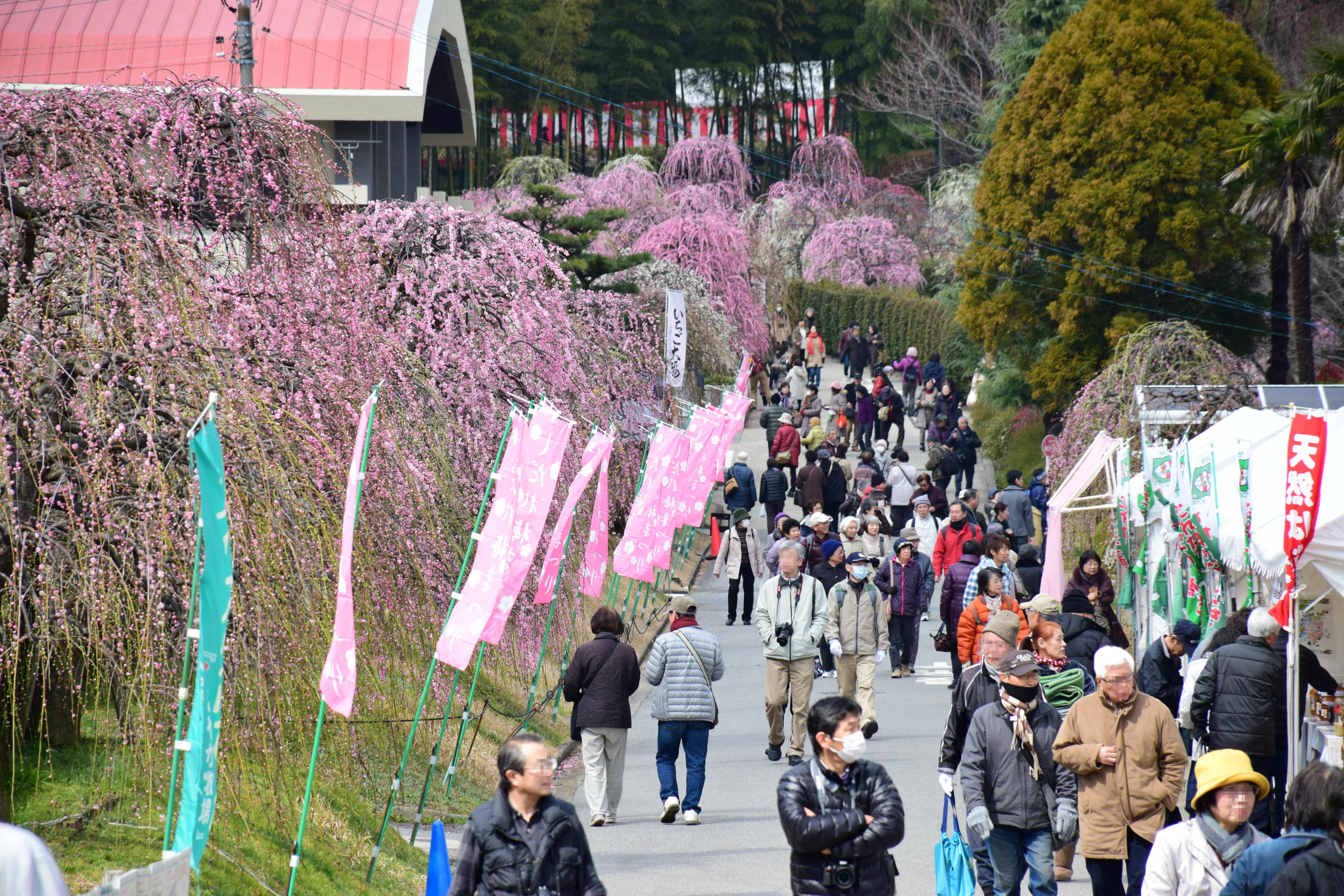

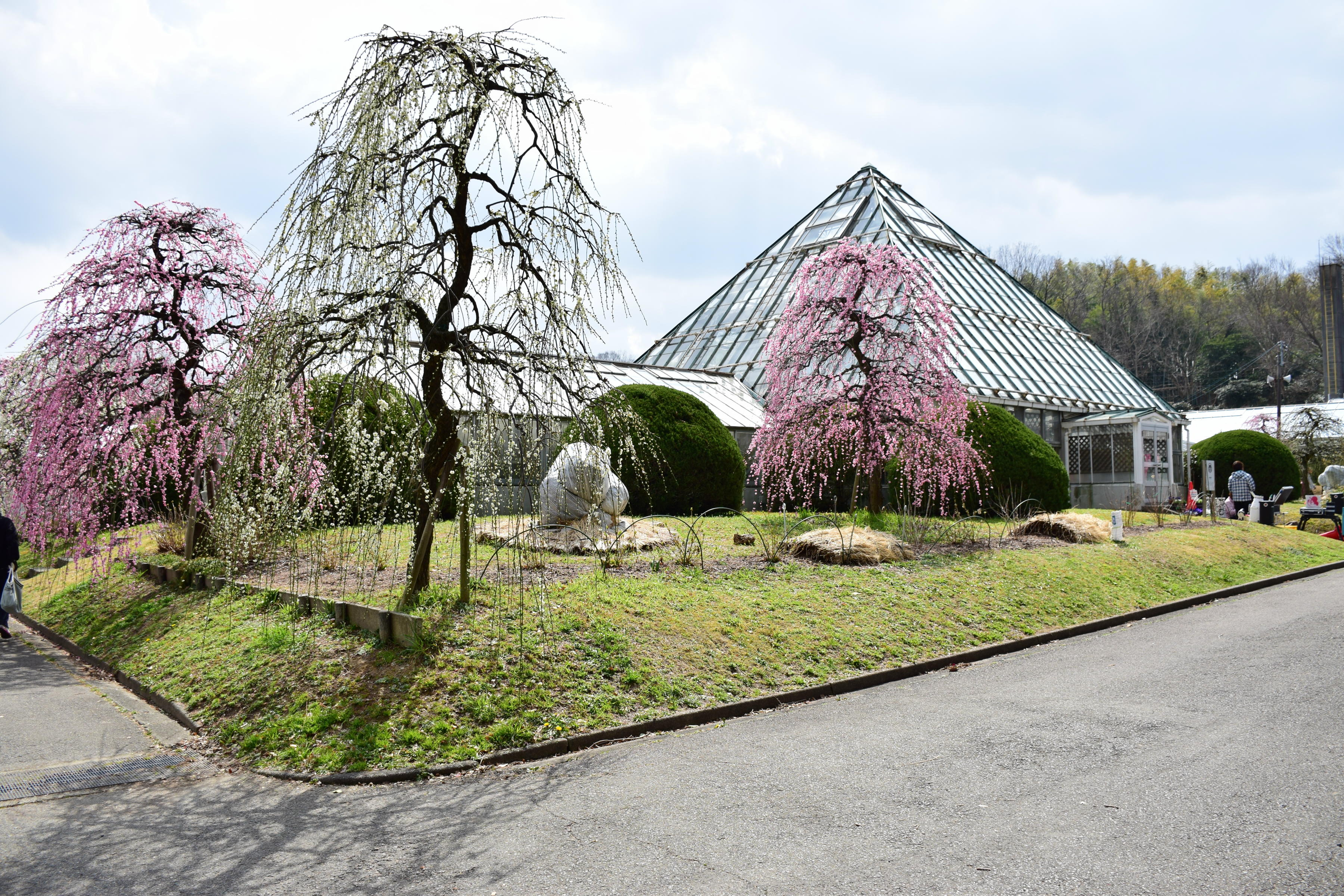

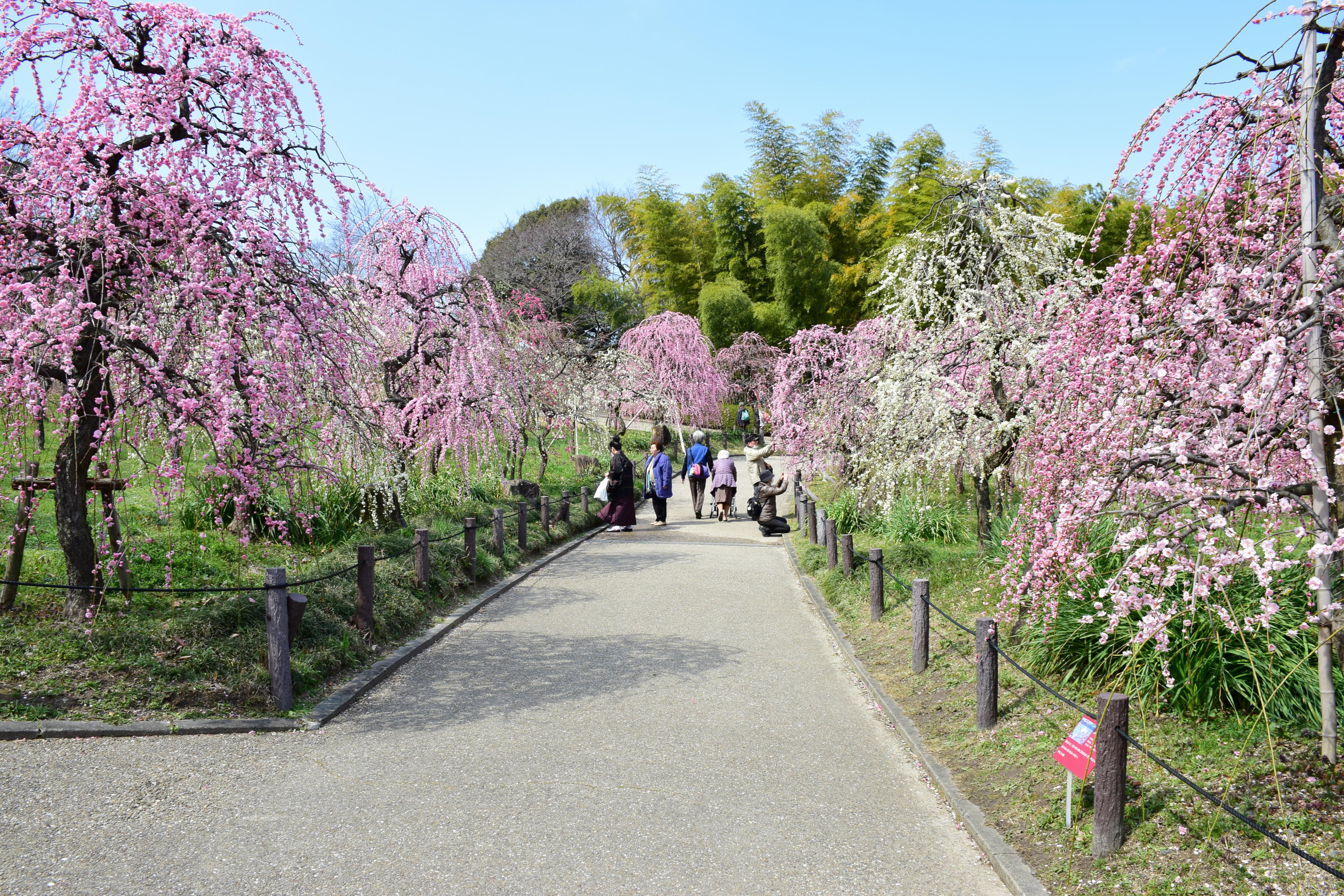

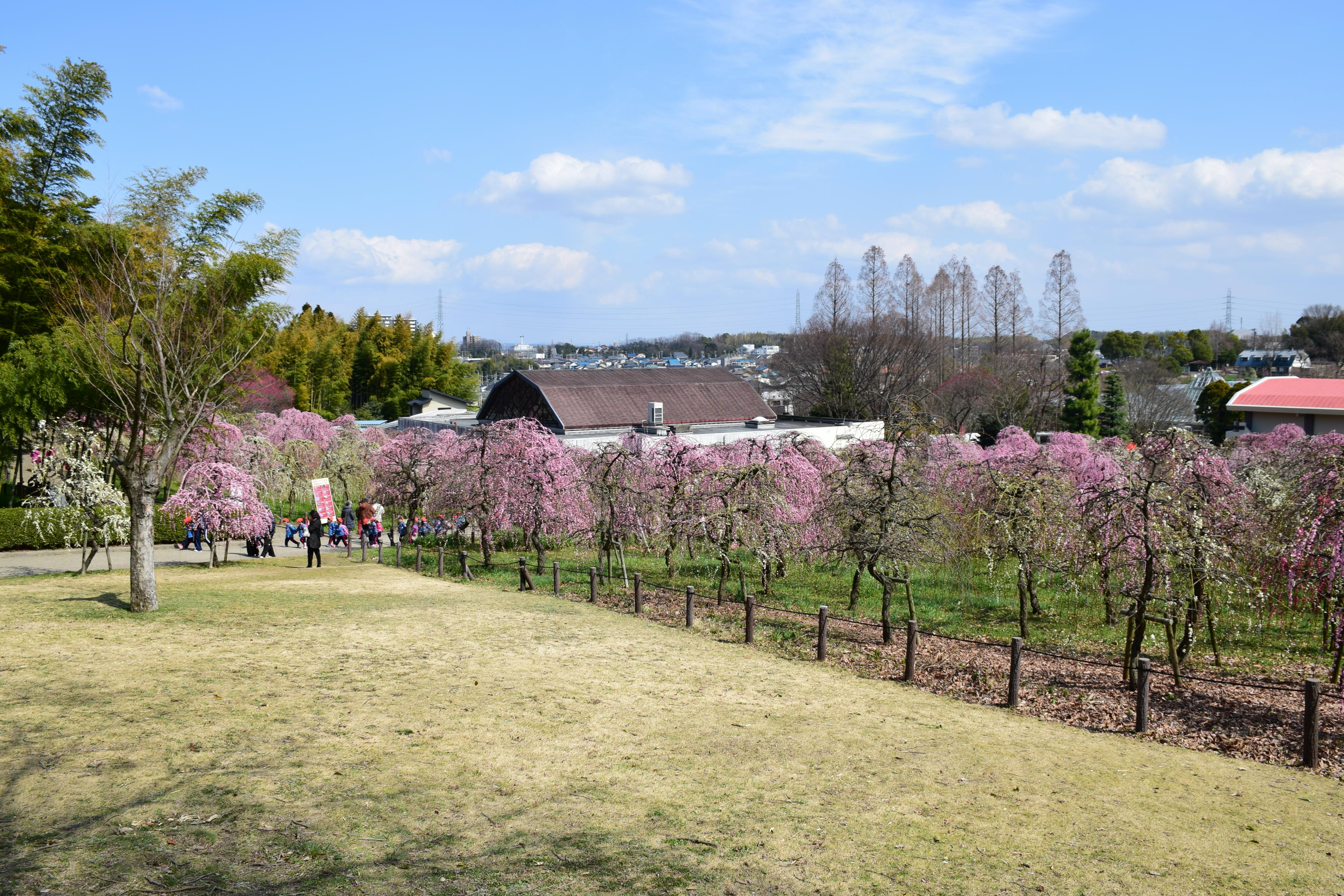

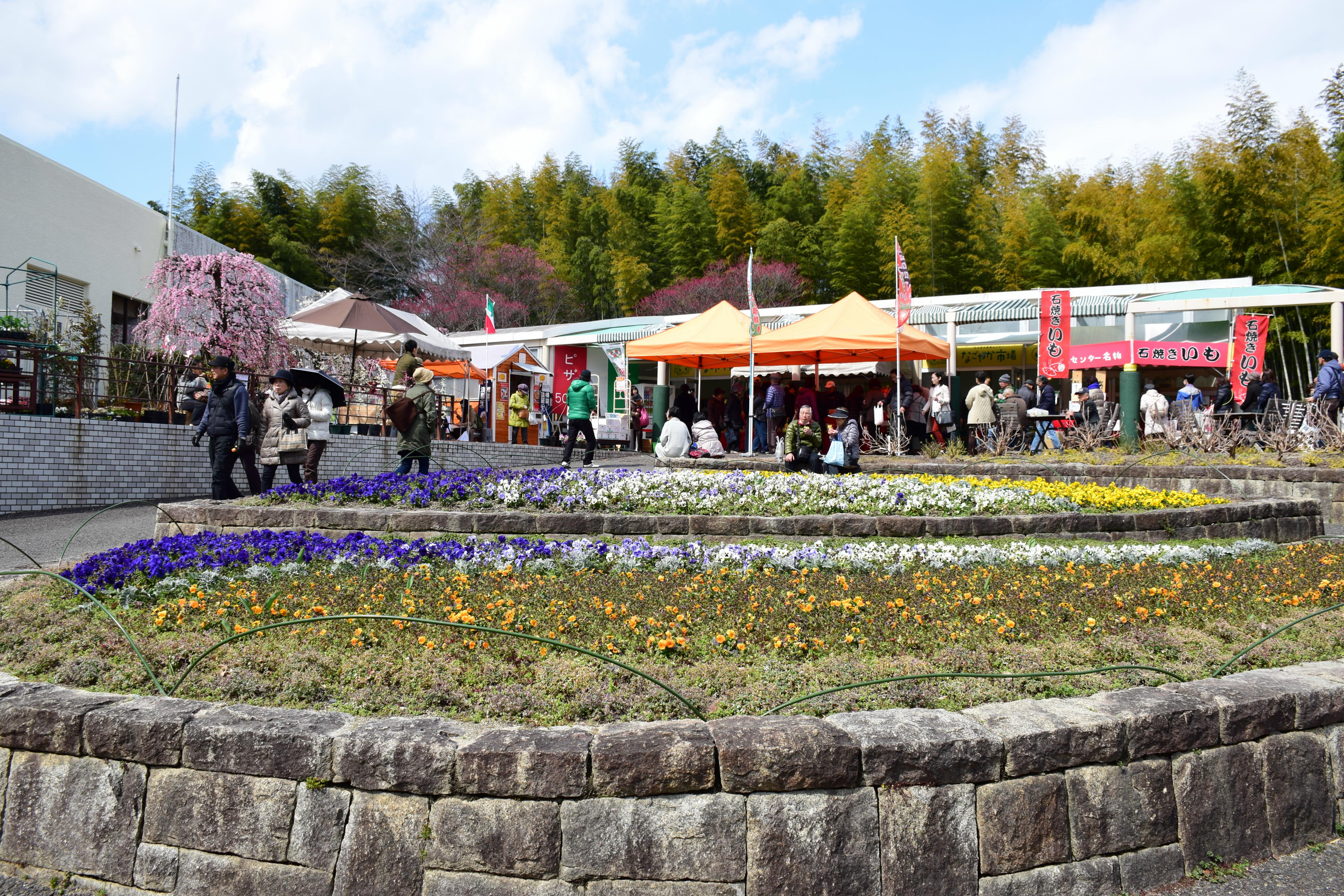

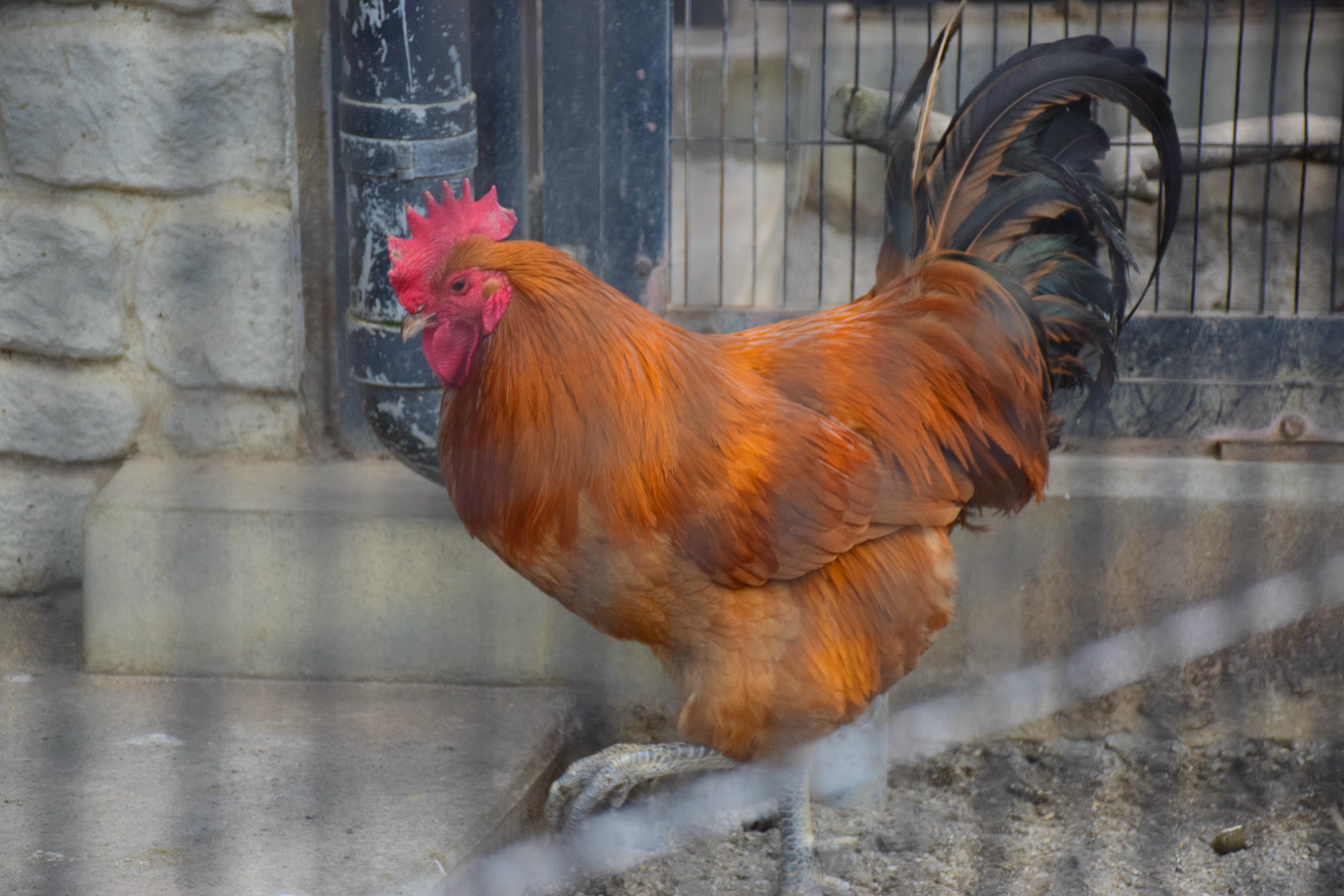
Nagoya Cochin

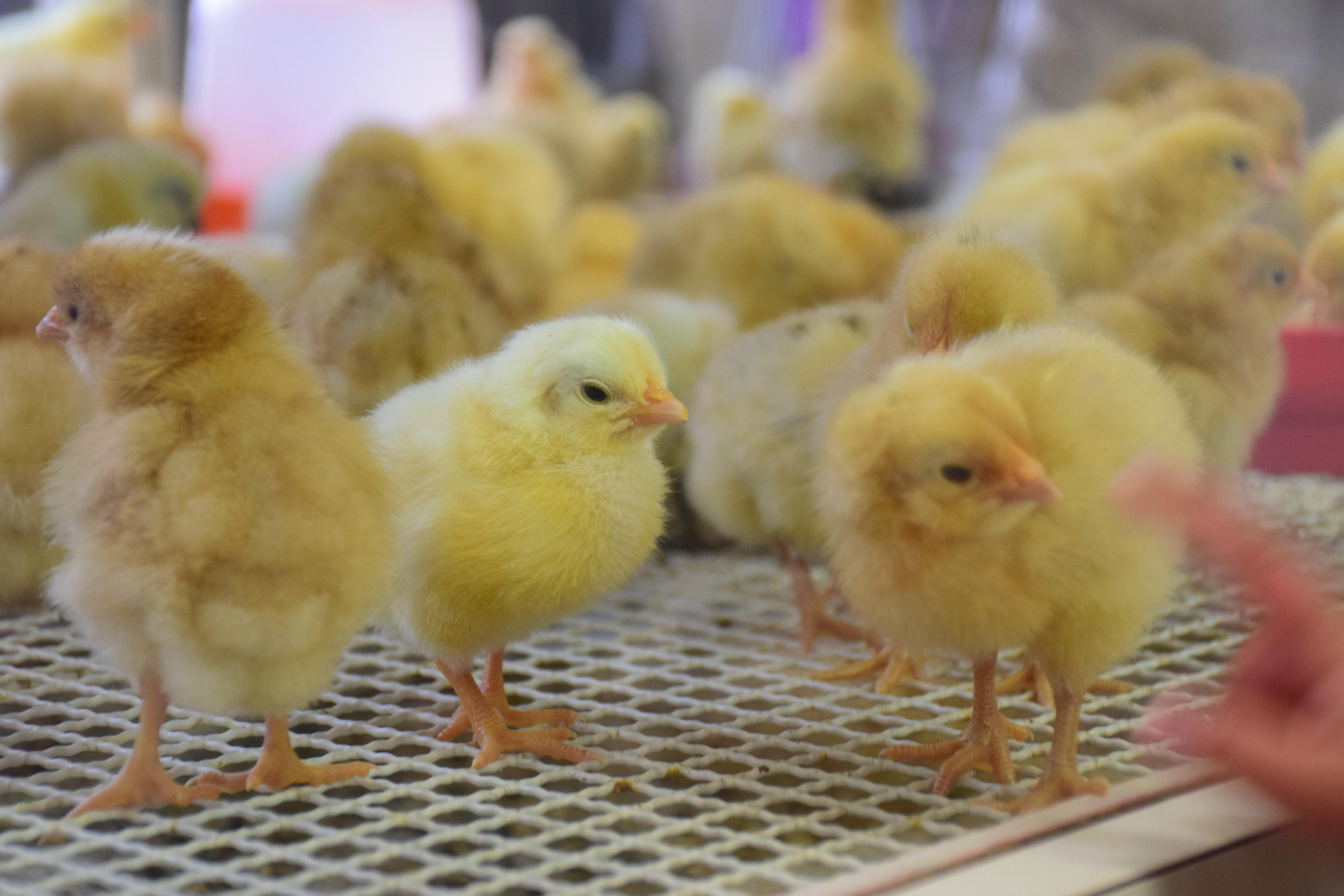

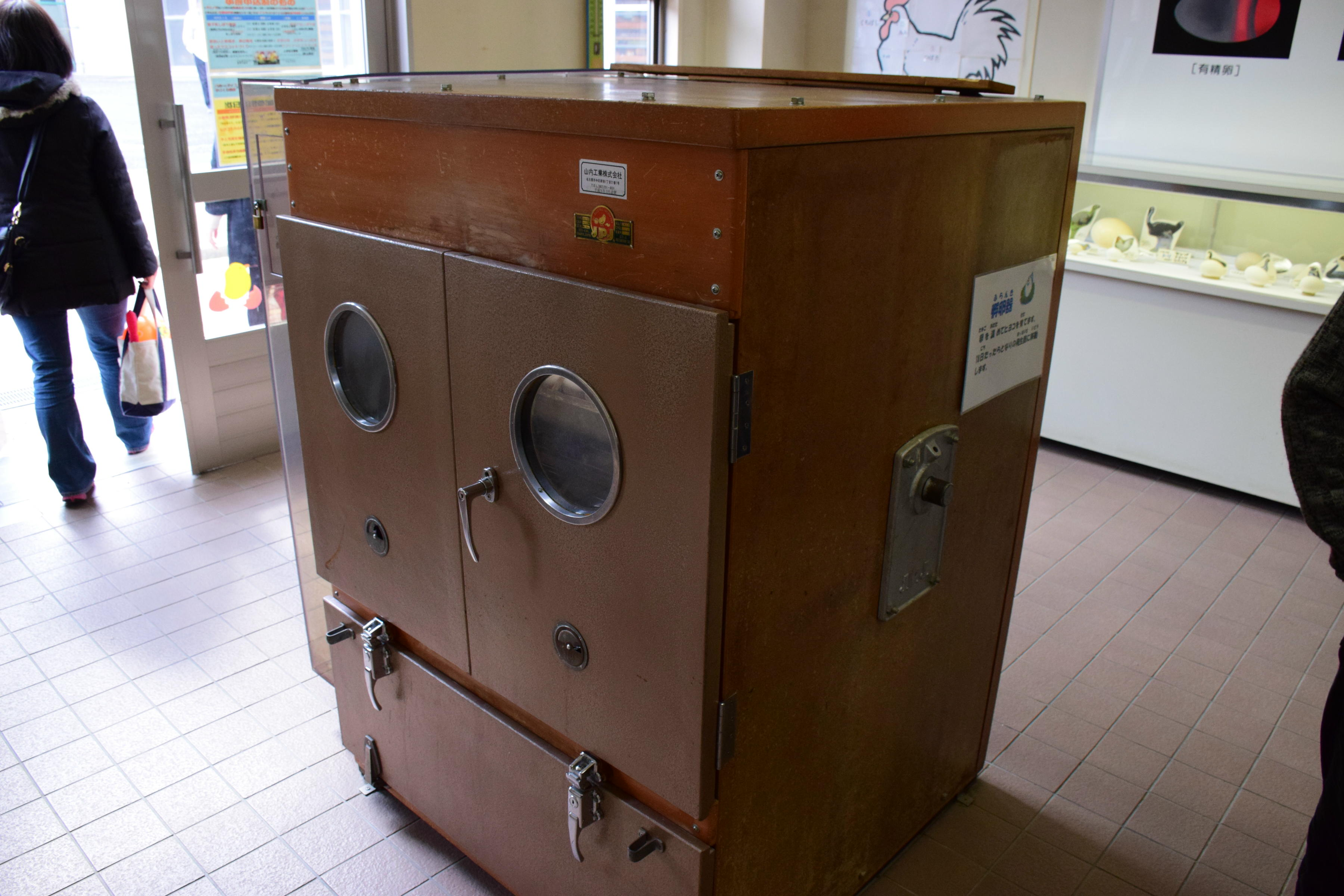
Incubator

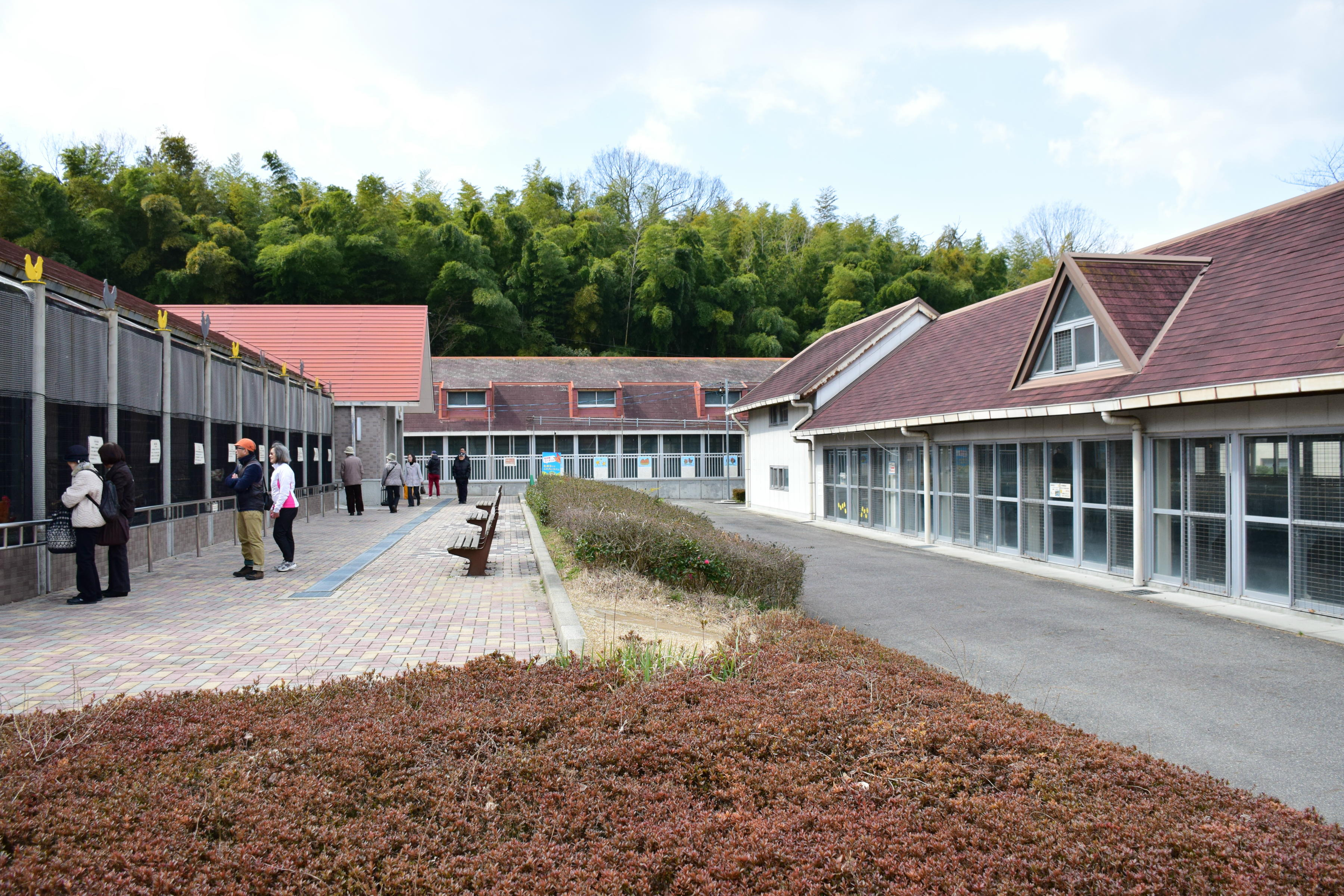
Livestock Production Facilities
