= Nagoya TV Tower =

Television tower in Japan

Coordinates: 35°10′20.7″N 136°54′30″E

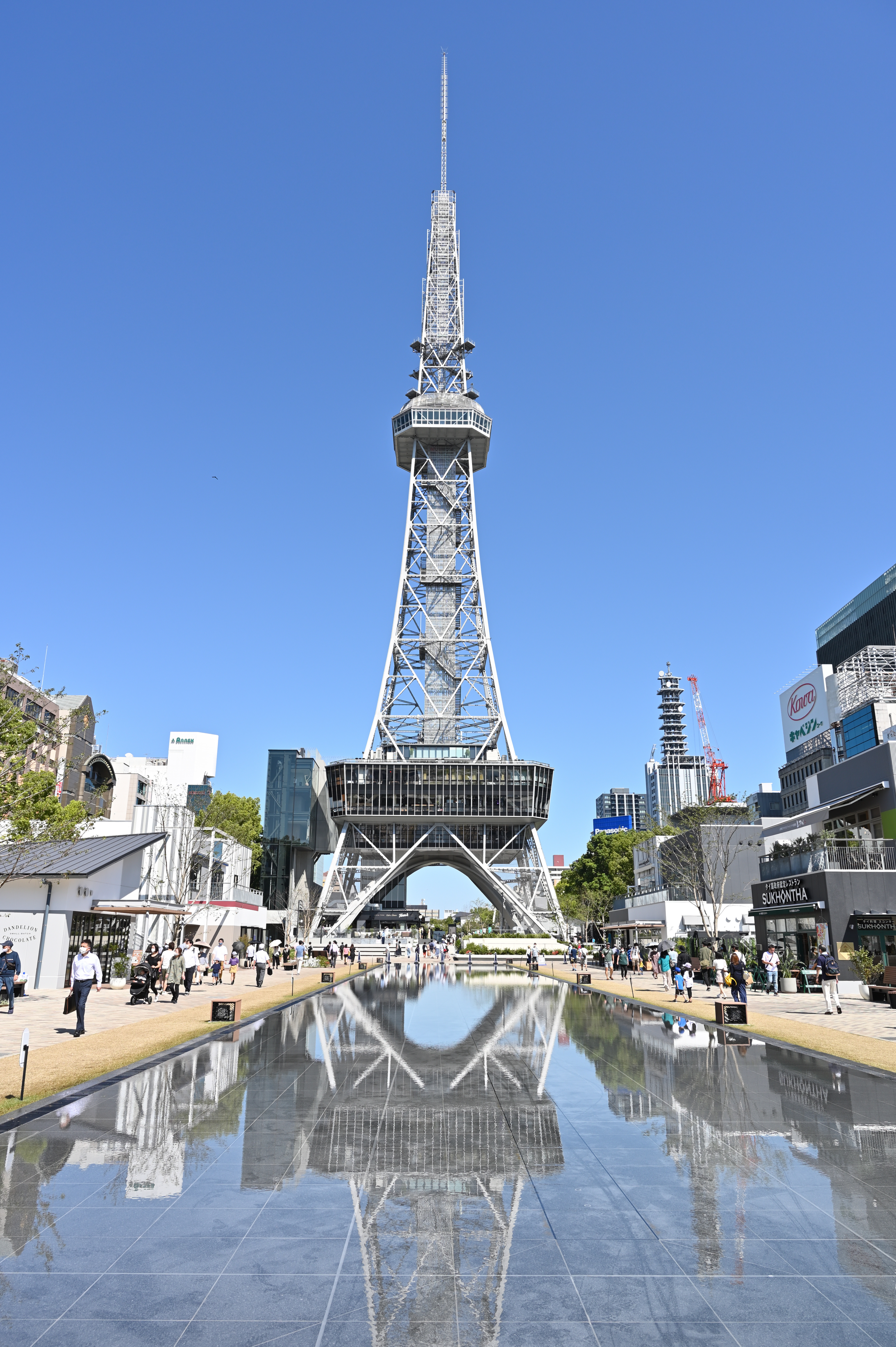
The Chubu Electric MIRAI TOWER

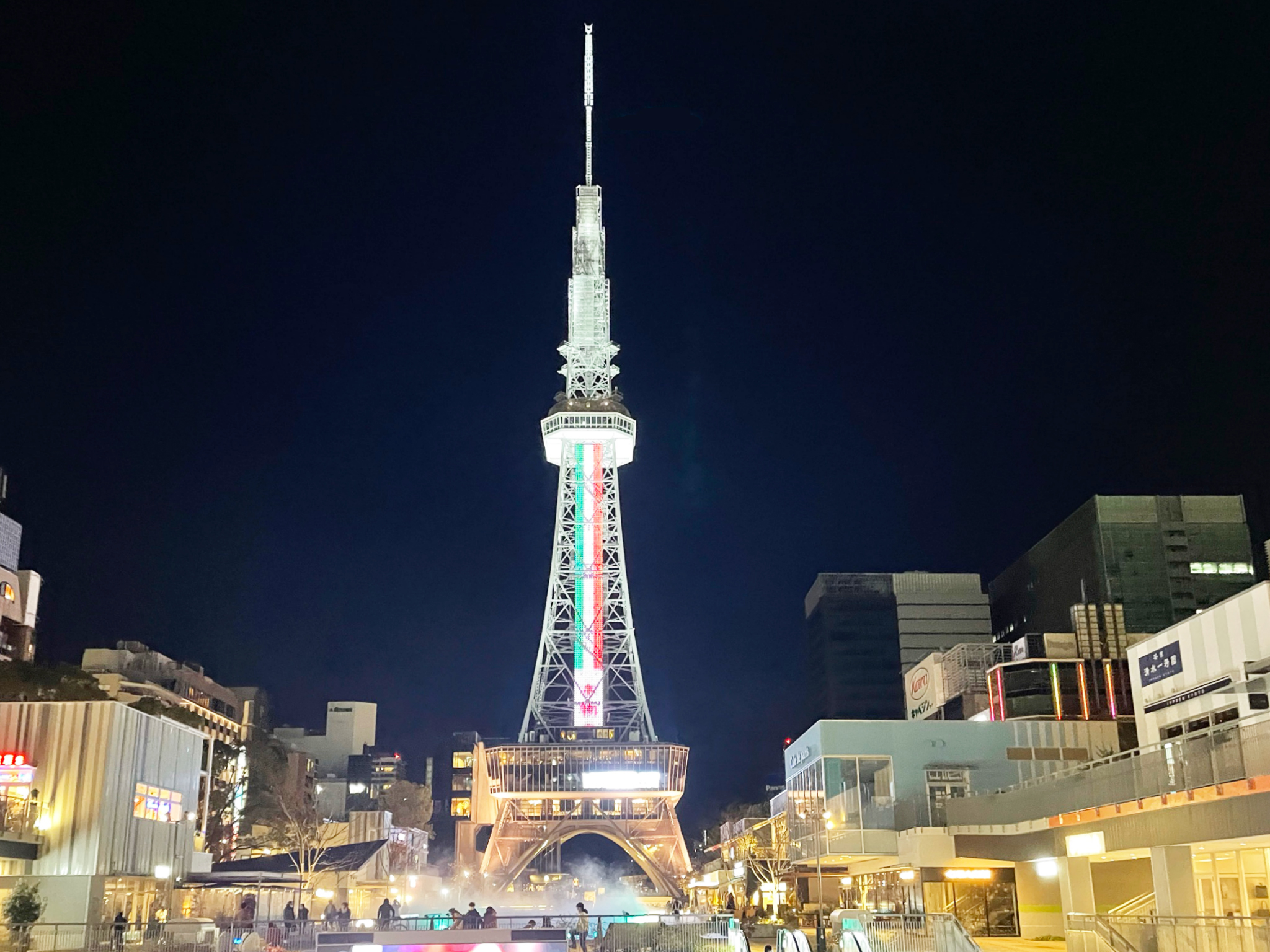
At night

The Chubu Electric MIRAI TOWER (中部電力 MIRAI TOWER, Chūbu Denryoku Mirai Tawā) (formerly but still referred to as the Nagoya TV Tower (名古屋テレビ塔, Nagoya Terebi-tō)) is a TV tower in Nagoya, central Japan.

== History ==
It is the oldest TV tower in Japan, and was completed in 1954. It is located in the centre of Hisaya Ōdori Park. The tower is 180 metres high, and has two main observation decks at the heights of 90 metres (the indoor Sky Deck) and 100 metres (the outdoor Sky Balcony). The tower also includes a restaurant and gallery at 30 metres. Nagoya TV Tower closely resembles the Eiffel Tower. Recently, the tower became known under the nickname of "Thunder Tower" due to the nighttime illumination. The tower also included a bowling alley at the top. In May 2021, the tower was given a new name, the Chubu Electric MIRAI TOWER.

== In popular culture ==
The famous movie monster, Godzilla pulled the tower down in Mothra vs. Godzilla (1964), and twenty-eight years later, it was destroyed again in the 1992 remake, Godzilla vs. Mothra. This time around, it is demolished by the monster Battra, when the creature attacks Nagoya.

In the anime Seraph of the End, the tower makes a brief appearance in episode 5 of season 2, where characters Yoichi Saotome and Shinya Hiragi use the tower as their sniping point in their mission to assassinate vampire noble Lucal Wesker.

== See also ==
- Sapporo TV Tower
- Tachū Naitō
- Tokyo Tower
