= Hisaya Ōdori Park =

Park in Nagoya, Japan

Coordinates: 35°10′07.35″N 136°54′30.18″E

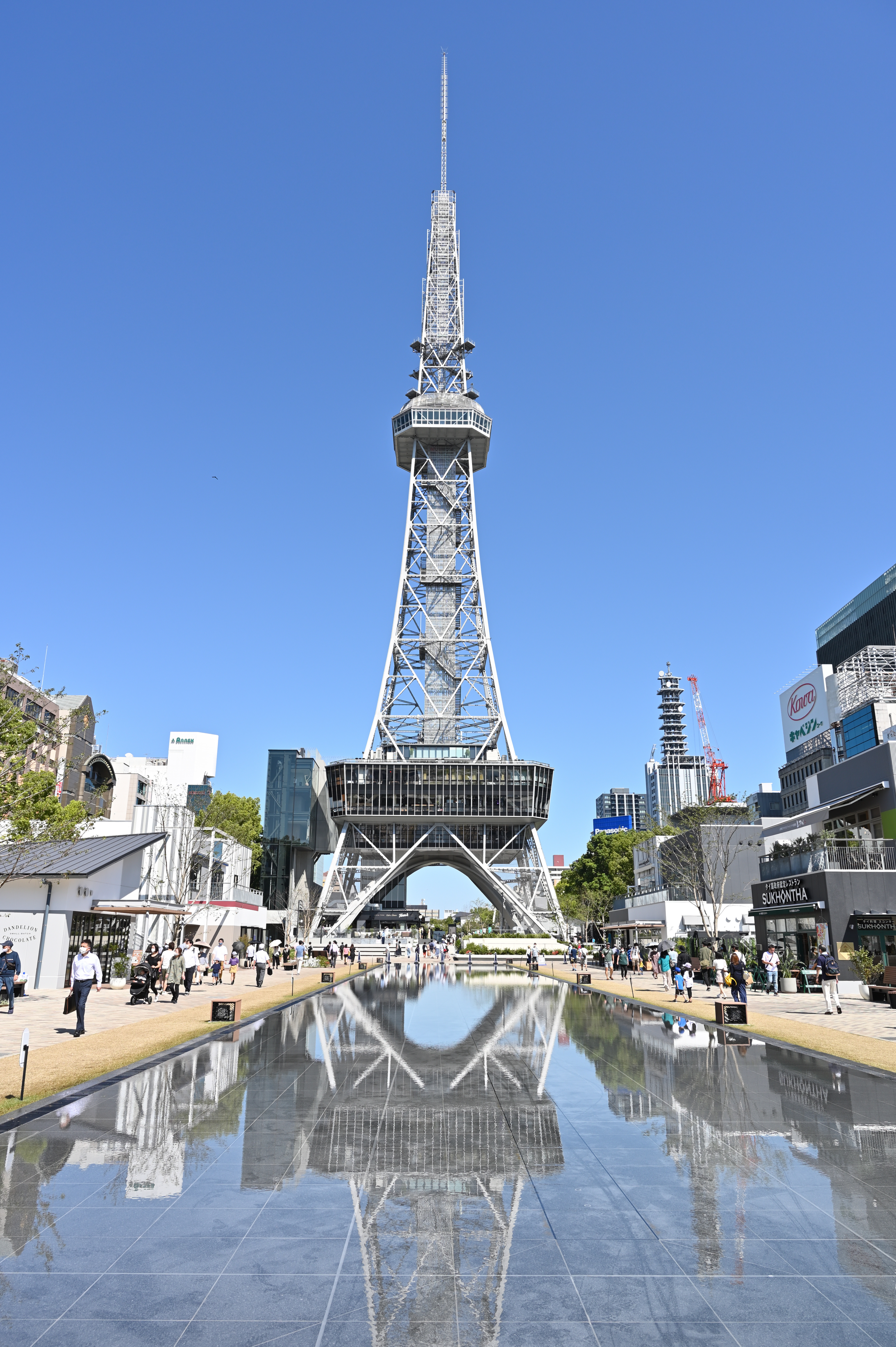
Nagoya TV Tower at the Hisaya-ōdōri Park

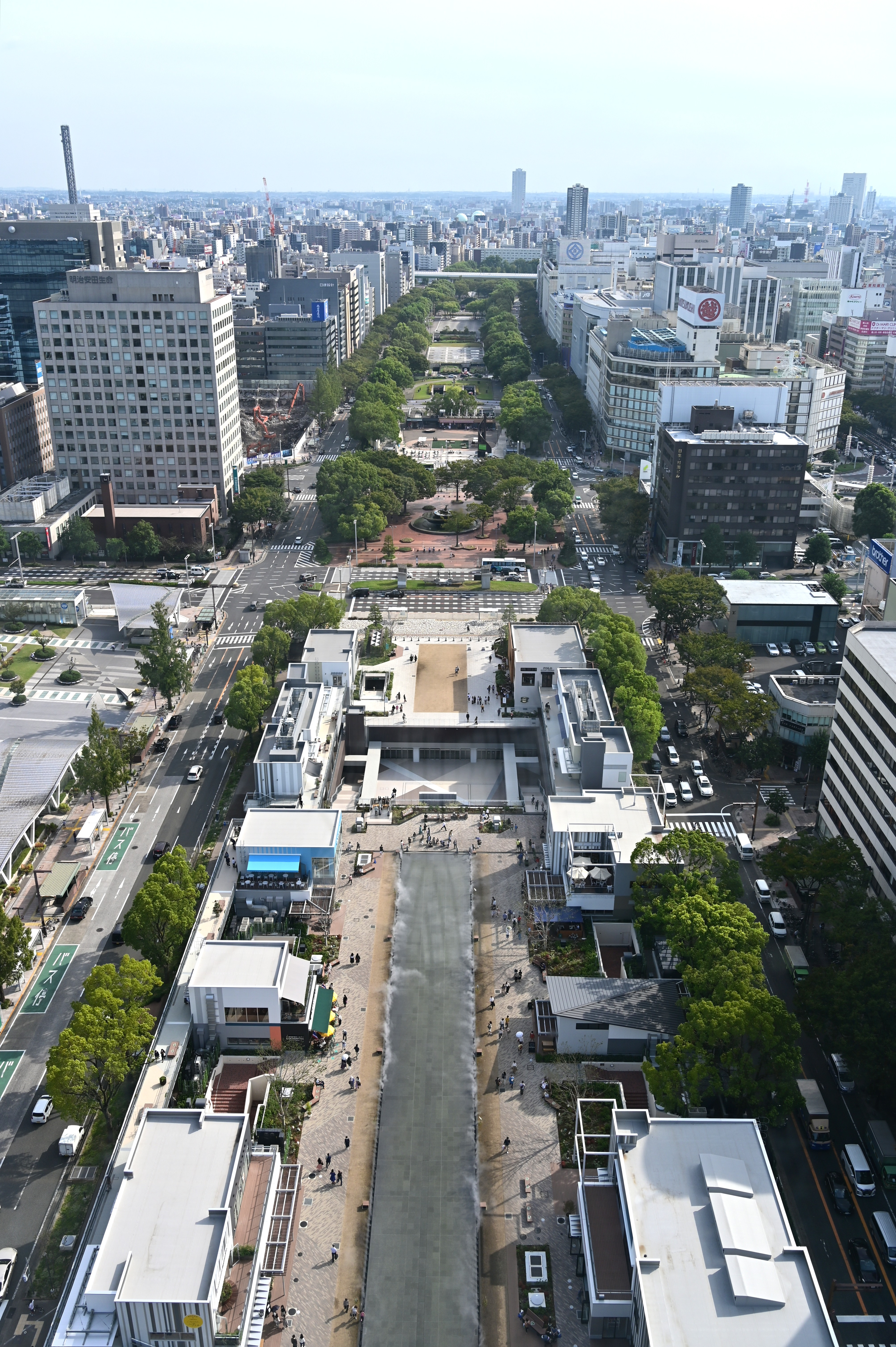
View of Hisaya-ōdōri Park from the Nagoya TV Tower

The Hisaya-ōdōri Park (久屋大通公園) is located in Sakae, Nagoya, in central Japan.

== History ==
The park was laid out after the devastation of World War II by the mayor of Nagoya, in order to create green space in the middle of the city. It acts as a central park within the downtown area and has over the years been laid out with many trees, water fountains and works of modern art such as sculptures and other installations. The park is around 2 km long and stretches roughly from north to south.

Nagoya TV Tower is located in the middle of the park.

The park is also the venue of the annual Nagoya Festival, which attracts many visitors.

The area is served by the Hisaya-ōdōri Station.
