= World Cosplay Summit =

Annual international cosplay event in Japan

- Status: Active
- Venue: Oasis 21 (2006–2013); Aichi Arts Center (2014–2017, 2019 – Present); Dolphins Arena (2018); Osu Shopping District (parade); Boulevard Riyadh City (2022 – Present)
- Locations: Sakae, Nagoya, Aichi
- Country: Japan
- Inaugurated: 2003
- Attendance: 248,000 (2016)
- Website: www.worldcosplaysummit.jp/en/

The World Cosplay Summit (世界コスプレサミット, Sekai Kosupure Samitto WCS) is an annual international cosplay event, which promotes global interaction through Japanese pop culture. It developed from a cosplay exhibition held at the Aichi Expo in 2005.

The WCS incorporated in 2012, by which time it had grown to include two weeks of activities, chief of which are a parade and championship held in Nagoya, Aichi, Japan, on Saturday and Sunday of the first weekend of August. Other related events are held in the Kanto, Kansai, and Tokai regions. Competitors are drawn from partnering anime/manga events held in the respective countries and regions.

The summit was organized by broadcaster TV Aichi until 2012. It is supported by several city organizations, businesses, the WCS student volunteer organization Omotenashi, and the Japanese Ministry of Foreign Affairs (MOFA), Ministry of Land, Infrastructure and Transport (MLIT), and Ministry of Economy, Trade and Industry (METI). Japanese embassy representatives often attend preliminaries of events in foreign countries. The WCS relies heavily on corporate sponsorship rather than ticket sales to fund its activities.

== History ==
The first World Cosplay Summit was held in 2003 to highlight the international popularity of Japanese anime and manga through cosplay (costume play). It was subsequently held as part of Expo 2005 in Nagoya, where it gathered considerable media attention. The event grew to include participants from 40 countries and encompasses multiple activities including the Osu Cosplay Parade and the Cosplay Championship.

WCS Key Facts
Year	Dates	No.countries	Venue	Champion
2003	Oct 12	4	Not Held	
2004	Aug 1	5	Not Held	
2005	Jul 31 – Aug 7	7	Expo Dome	Italy
2006	Aug 5 – 6	9	Oasis 21	Brazil
2007	Aug 4 – 5	12	Oasis 21	France
2008	Aug 2 – 3	13	Oasis 21	Brazil
2009	Aug 1 – 2	15	Oasis 21	Japan
2010	Jul 31 – Aug 1	15	Oasis 21	Italy
2011	Aug 6 – 7	17	Oasis 21	Brazil
2012	12 days	22	Oasis 21	Japan
2013	Aug 2 – 3	24	Oasis 21	Italy
2014	Jul 26 – Aug 3	26	Aichi Arts Center	Russia
2015	Aug 1 – 2	28	Aichi Arts Center	Mexico
2016	Aug 6 – 7	30	Aichi Arts Center	Indonesia
2017	Aug 5 – 6	34	Aichi Arts Center	China
2018	Aug 3 – 5	36	Dolphins Arena	Mexico
2019	Aug 27 – 31	40	Tokyo Dome, Aichi Arts Center	Australia
2021	Aug 8	30	Oasis 21	Germany
2022	Aug 6 – 7	28 (Later 27)	Aichi Arts Center, Oasis 21	France (Stage Division) And Sweden (Video Division)
2022 EX	Sep 3 – 4	39	Boulevard Riyadh City	Indonesia
2023	Aug 5 – 6	34 (Later 33)	Aichi Arts Center, Oasis 21	United Kingdom
2023 Cosplay Cup	Aug 27 – 28	45	Boulevard Riyadh City	Latvia
2024 WCCS	June 8 – 9	32	Commufa Esports Stadium Nagoya (Online Event)	Poland
2024	Aug 3 – 4	36	Aichi Arts Center, Oasis 21	Japan
2025	Aug 3	41	Aichi Arts Center	USA
2026	Jul 31 – Aug 2	41 (Later 40)	Aichi Arts Center	Hong Kong
2027	November 12 - 14		Aichi Arts Center	

=== 2003–2007 ===
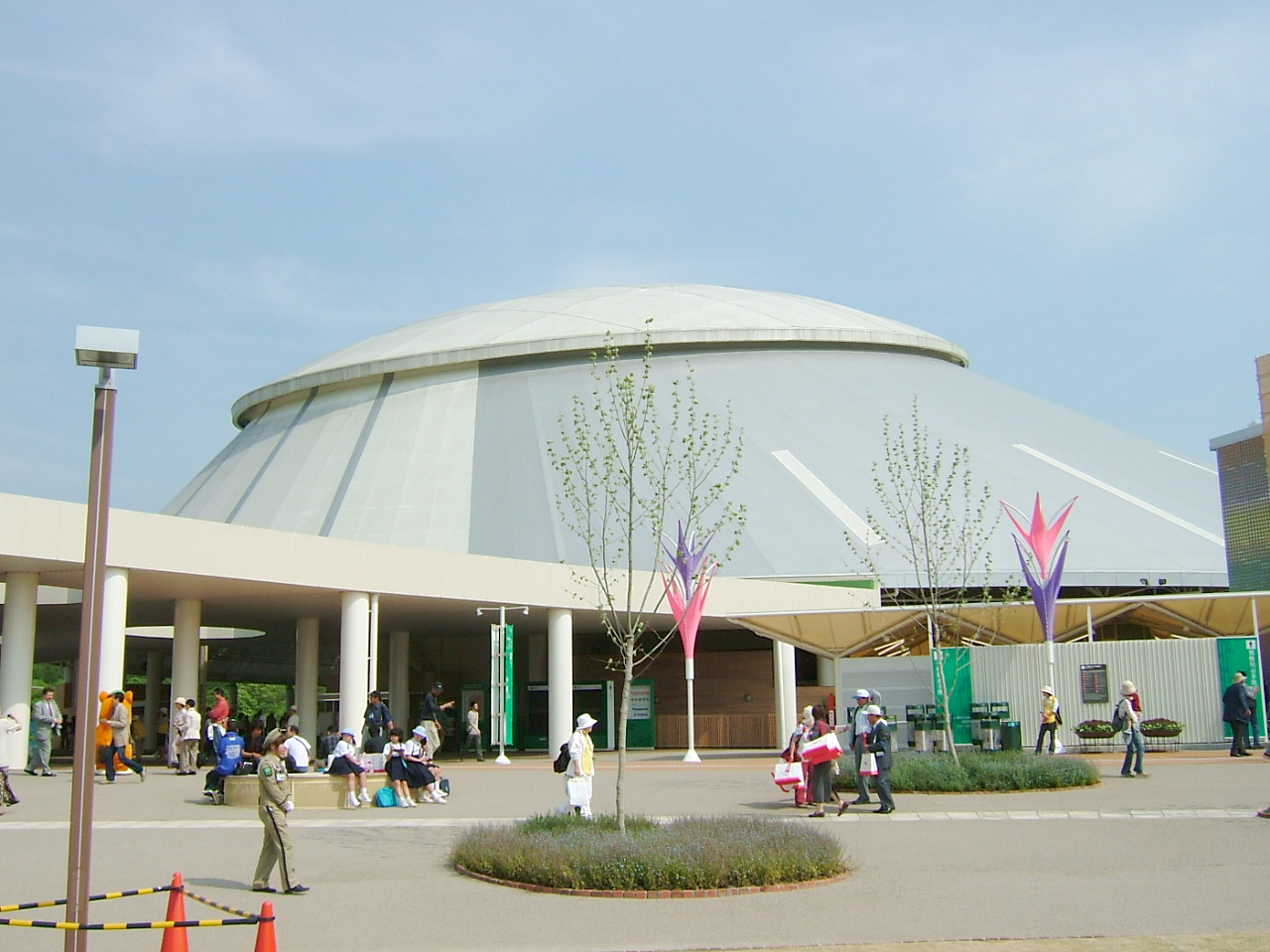
Expo Dome, the venue for the 2005 Cosplay Championship

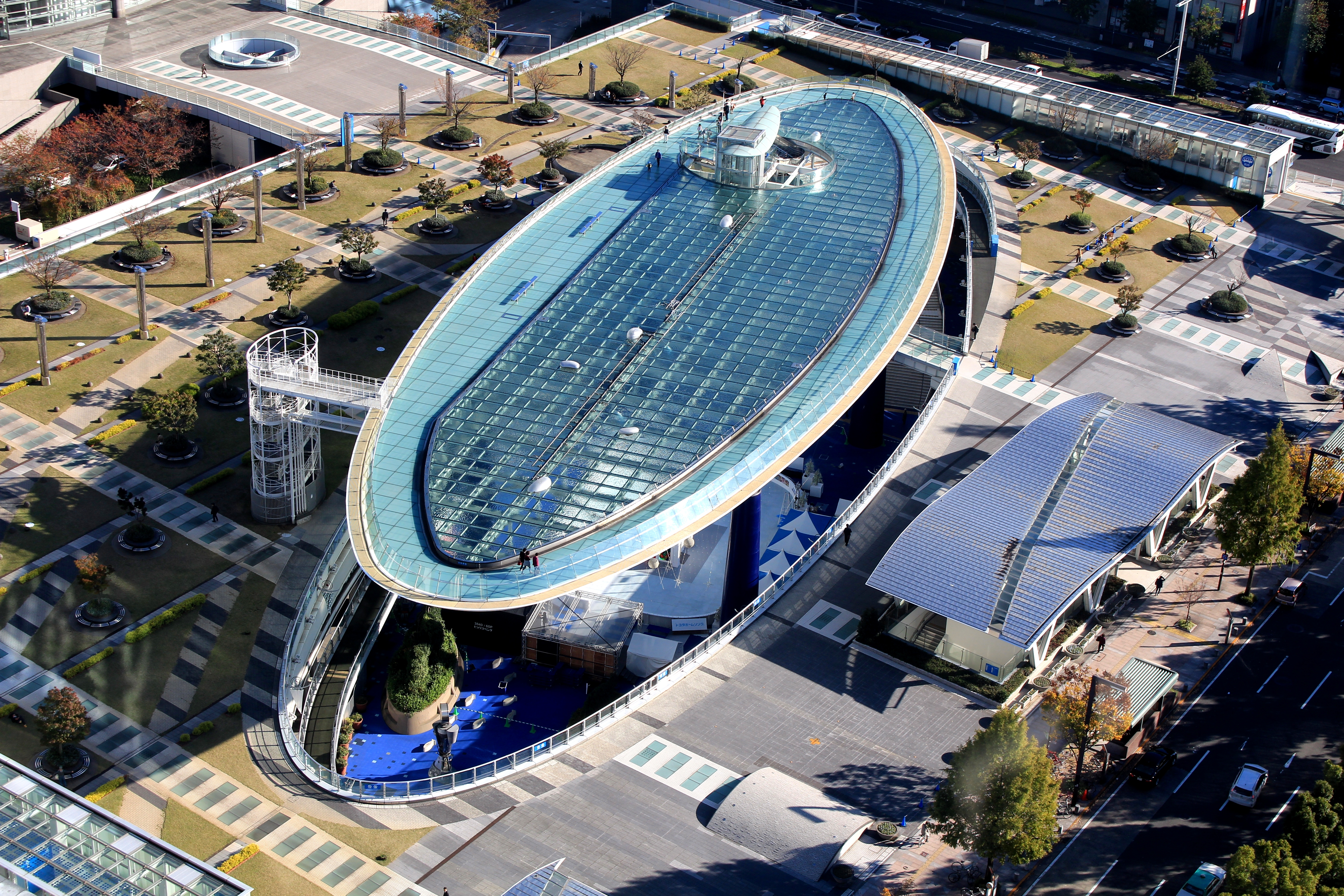
Oasis 21, the venue for the 2006–2013 Cosplay Championships

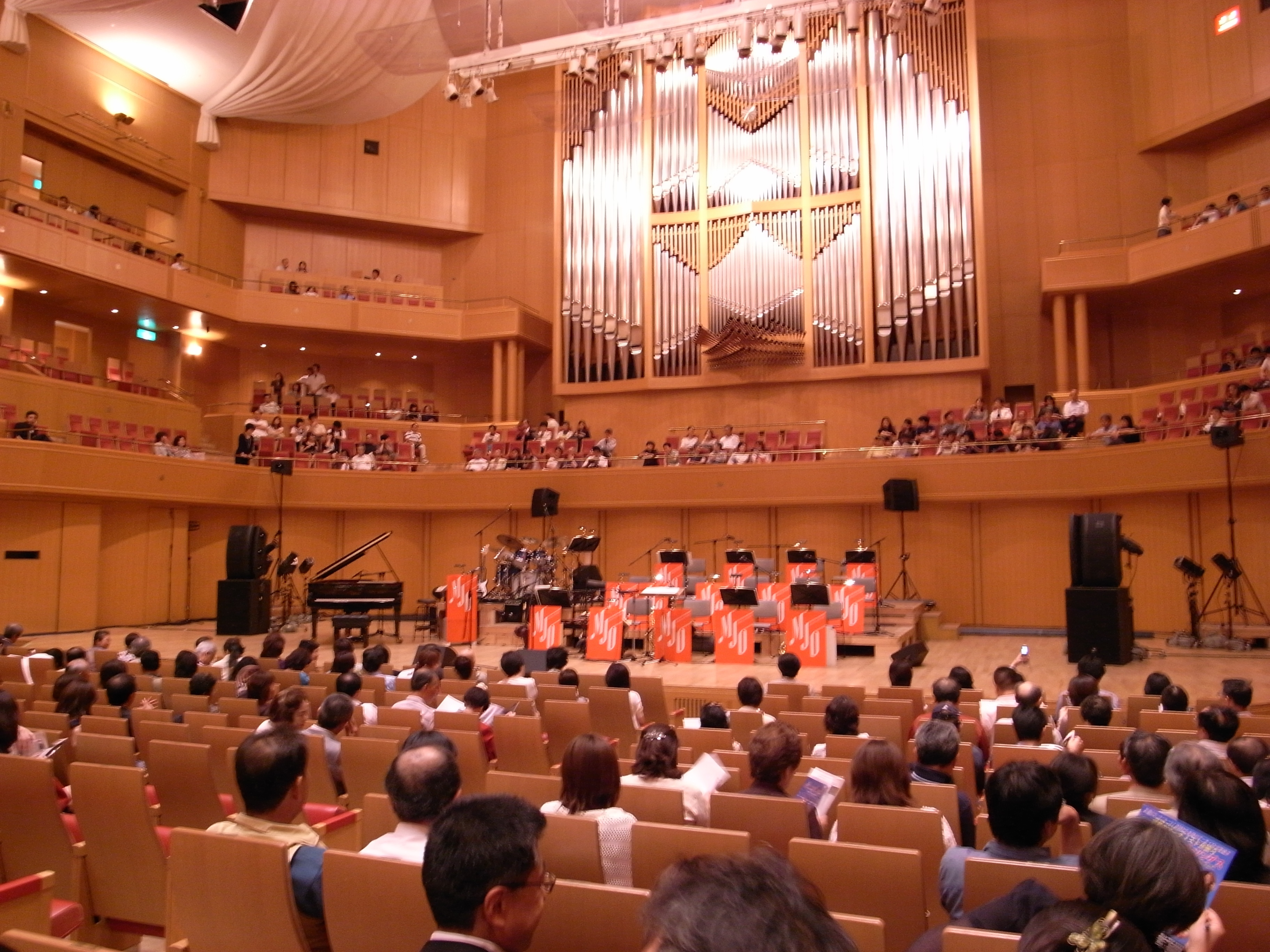
Aichi Arts Center, the venue for the 2014–2017 Cosplay Championships

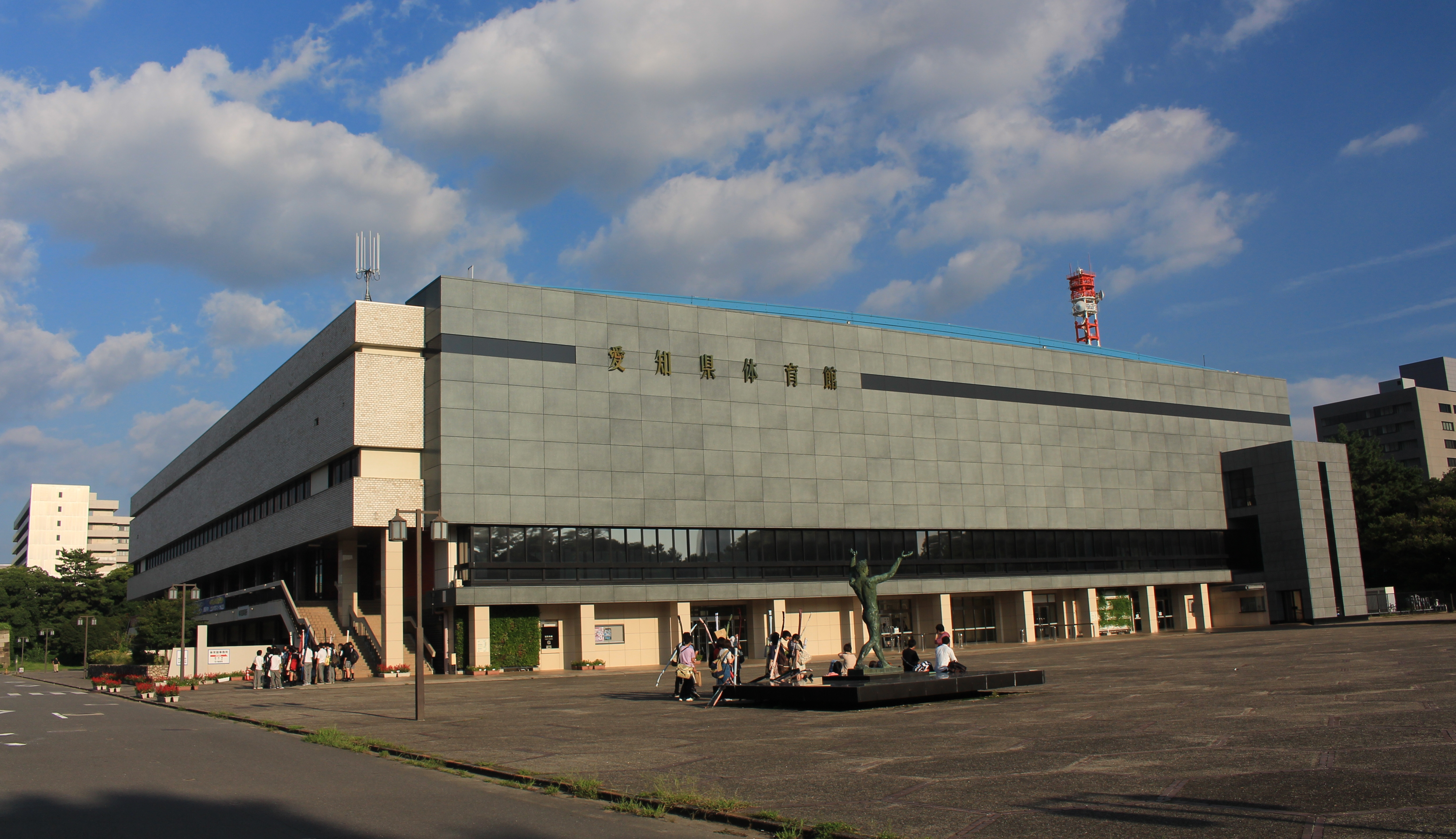
Dolphins Arena (Aichi Prefectural Gymnasium), 2018 venue for the Cosplay Championship

On October 12, 2003, the first event was held at the Rose Court Hotel in Nagoya. Activities included a panel discussion and photography session. Five cosplayers were invited from Germany, France and Italy; "International Common Language" (MANGAは世界の共通語), a television programme dealing with the contemporary situation of anime and manga in Frankfurt, Paris and Rome, was produced and broadcast on November 24.

The 2004 event was held on August 1 at the Ōsu shopping district in Naka-ku, Nagoya. Eight international cosplayers were invited, and about 100 cosplayers participated in the inaugural Osu Cosplay Parade.

In 2005, the WCS was reorganized from an invitation-based system to a qualifying system with preliminary events held around the world, leading to the first WCS Cosplay Championship. Four cosplayers in single and group teams represented participating countries. Along with supporting activities, the event took place in two main locations: the Cosplay Parade was held in Osu on July 31 and the Cosplay Championship was held at the Expo Dome on August 7 during Expo 2005. 40 people from seven countries participated in the first Cosplay Championship, with France winning the group category, Italy winning the individual category, and with the overall contest winner being Italy. The initial goal of the event was to bring a part of Japanese youth culture to Expo 2005.

In 2006, the venue for the Cosplay Championship was moved to Oasis 21 in Sakae, Nagoya. Nine countries competed: Italy, Germany, France, Spain, China, Brazil, Thailand, Singapore and Japan, with a total of 22 cosplayers. The grand prize was won by brother-and-sister team Maurisio and Monica Somenzari L. Olivas, representing Brazil. (Dressed respectively as Hughes de Watteau and Augusta Vradica from Trinity Blood, they made their costumes by hand with help from their parents.) The event was supported by Japan's Ministry of Foreign Affairs (MOFA) and Ministry of Land, Infrastructure and Transport (MLIT). Over 5,000 people attended the Cosplay Championship stage event and several thousand more attended the Cosplay Parade. TV Aichi produced and broadcast, "World Cosplay Summit 2006: New Challengers".

In 2007, Denmark, Mexico and South Korea joined the event to bring the number of participating countries to 12, with a total of 28 participating cosplayers. About 10,000 people attended the Cosplay Championship. "World Cosplay Summit 2007: Giza-suge yatsura ga yattekita Z!" (The Super Cool Have Arrived!) was televised, and became a part of MLIT's 2007 "Visit Japan" campaign.

=== 2008–2012 ===
In 2008, with growing recognition of Japan's otaku culture, the Ministry of Economy, Trade and Industry (METI) became the third national ministry to join in official support of the event. About 300 cosplayers participated in the Parade. Thirteen countries with a total of 28 representative cosplayers performed in the Championship in front of 12,000 visitors. TV Aichi produced and broadcast the WCS special "Everyone's Heroes Get Together!". It's a last time Japan had more national team representative than one team.

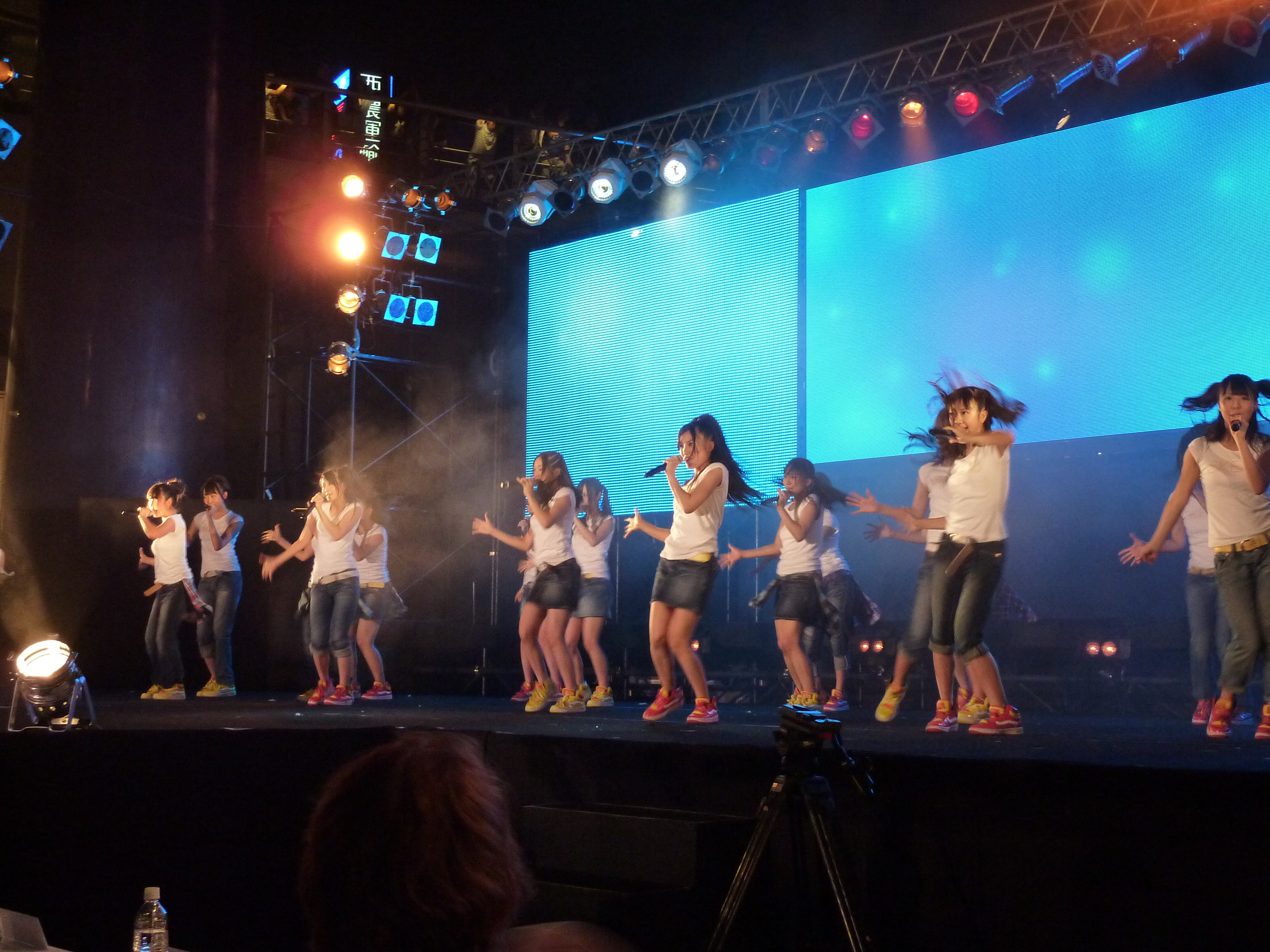
SKE48 Team KII performing at the World Cosplay Summit 2010

In April 2009, the WCS Executive Committee was created to administrate the development and expansion of the event. The parade had grown to 500 cosplayers, and 30 participants from 15 countries competed in the Cosplay Championship before 12,000 spectators, with Australia and Finland being the two newest participating nations. The first international symposium was held at Nagoya University entitled "Outward Minded: Worldwide Impact of Cosplay and Interpretations in Japan".

In 2010, the symposium was moved to the Mode Gakuen Spiral Towers.The number of visitors in event reached 89,800.

In 2011, the Netherlands and Malaysia joined, bringing the total participating countries to 17.

In 2012, the United Kingdom, Indonesia and Russia entered competitively at WCS, with Hong Kong and Taiwan participating under observer status, bringing the total number of represented countries to 22. WCS expanded to 12 days for its 10th anniversary, with official visits paid to Gifu, Mie, Tottori and Aichi Prefectural offices, and a second parade was held in Ichinomiya during the Tanabata Festival. The sequence of activities were altered, with the Championship held on the Saturday and the Parade on Sunday.

=== 2013–2017 ===
In 2013, Vietnam and the Philippines joined as observer nations, bringing the overall total to 24. The event was held with the help of local and international volunteers since 2009; however, this year saw the beginning of the Omotenashi (Hospitality) student volunteer group. This was the first year of the WCS as an independent company after 10 years where it was organized through the Events Department of TV Aichi. This was the first year of the World Cosplay Summit has become available broadcast live via Niconico.

In 2014, This was the first year that the Championship was held at the Aichi Arts Center beside Oasis 21. Portugal was selected to join. Also, Kuwait joined the WCS as the first nation from the Middle East, which brought the total number of participating nations/regions to 26.The number of visitors to the main venue, Oasis 21, exceeded 200,000.

In 2015, The Championship moved to the largest venue within the Aichi Arts Center called 'The Theater'. With the inclusion of Canada and Sweden as Observer Nations, the number of participating nations/regions now total 28.This is the last year that WCS used the song "We are the world" during the closing ceremony on stage after using this song many years before.

In 2016, India (the first nation from South Asia) and Switzerland joined the WCS, bringing the number of participating nations/region to 30. With this large field, the Championship was held in two stages over consecutive days. The First Stage, held on Saturday, will be divided into 2 groups and only 8 teams will be selected per group to qualify for the next round by an organized committee from each country who has no stake in their own country in each group and special prizes (Brother, Niconico etc.) will be distributed immediately after the selection. It was later found that the votes were miscounted, with Germany and South Korea having the same score as some of the nations with the fewest points to qualify. The jury has decided that both nations will advance to the next round for justice. which resulted in a total of 18 teams qualified for the next round. In The Second Stage held on Sunday All teams qualified in the afternoon before the start of the main event in the Championship round. They had to meet with the committee to explain the costumes. This was the first year of the World Cosplay Summit has become available used backscreen for enhance abilities representative's performance.The number of visitors during the periad exceeded 300,000. "We Can Start!!", the official WCS theme song, sung by Tōru Furuya WCS senior judges, was first sung during closing ceremonies on stage and later became the theme song during WCS events, including used in the closing ceremony on stage until now

In 2017, 15th anniversary of the WCS.Nagoya city declared ”Cosplay Host Town”.Belgium, Chile, Myanmar, Puerto Rico, and United Arab Emirates joined, while Kuwait withdrew, bringing the number of participating nations/region to 34. This was the first year the WCS allowed the use of dialog and scenarios from Japanese live action adaptations for performances. During the final stage of the Championships, participants from Taiwan and Brazil made unexpected marriage proposals on the stage.

=== 2018–2022 ===
In 2018, Bulgaria, Costa Rica, and South Africa joined WCS. Kuwait returned to participate while Puerto Rico and United Arab Emirates were unable to send representatives, bringing the number of participating nations/regions to 36. The Championship was held in a single stage at the Dolphins Arena Gymnasium. The Taiwanese cosplayers who became engaged during the 2017 championship held their wedding ceremony in the Wedding Hall Photo Party event;after the cake cutting ceremony, there was another surprise as the male WCS representative from Singapore made an unexpected marriage proposal.A night parade event was held for the first time at Central Park underground street.

In 2019, Austria, Israel, Saudi Arabia, and Trinidad and Tobago joined WCS. United Arab Emirates returned to participate after being absent in 2018 while Kuwait and Puerto Rico were unable to send representatives for this year, bringing the number of participating nations/regions to 40. The WCS Championship expanded to a three-stage event: the Tokyo Round at Tokyo Dome City Hall on 27 August, only the two teams with the most points in each group from the costume show will be qualified for the finals immediately and the remaining 32 teams will compete in the next round. It was originally announced that Group 3's Mexico and Costa Rica would advance to the Final, With the mistake of counting the votes and it was discovered later that Russia had more points than Costa Rica. So Russia has the right to compete in the final instead of Costa Rica. On 31 August, A bridal cosplay party was held in Wedding Hall Bleu Leman, where the male WCS Alumni 2018 from Chile made an unexpected marriage proposal during the event. The Nagoya Round (Semi) and Final (Championship) moved to the venue within the Aichi Arts Center. In the Nagoya Round, there will be a method of selection through the Stage Performance Contest. Only 16 teams can advance to the final and compete against the 8 previous teams who have previously qualified for the final, a total of 24 teams in the World Cosplay Championship. This was the first year of the WCS was broadcast live on YouTube, But Tokyo Round And Nagoya Round Only.

In 2020, the cosplay championship stage was cancelled due to the COVID-19 pandemic. In place of the event, a 24-hour live stream fund-raising event and a Kickstarter campaign was held to support the event in Japan and its partner organizations around the world. The campaign raised over 11,000,000 yen.

In 2021, Colombia, Latvia, and Ukraine joined WCS and Saudi Arabia participated as an observer. However, due to COVID-19 restrictions on gatherings and travel, a number of countries/regions were unable to send teams, including Colombia, Latvia, Austria, China, South Korea, Trinidad and Tobago, UAE, Portugal, Denmark, and Myanmar.This brought the number of participating nations to 30. WCS 2021 was planned to utilize a combination of recorded, online and in-person events.A large mosaic mural of the Oasis 21 complex depicting cosplay images of many of the campaign backers was hung at Chubu International Airport. The WCS Championship was broadcast live on multiple channels: officially on Facebook, Niconico, and YouTube and by recognized broadcasters in various languages on Bilibili, Discord, and Twitch.

Boulevard Riyadh City, the venue for the WCS Exhibition Event the first time in outside of Japan in Riyadh, Saudi Arabia

In 2022 will the 20th anniversary of the WCS but COVID-19 pandemic are continues including 2022 Russian invasion of Ukraine, a number of countries/regions were unable to send teams. The WCS organizing committee stipulates that there will be competitions in two categories by WCS representatives are coming to Japan with 11 nations for participate in Stage division (6 August) and 17 nations who cannot send representatives come to Japan will send video for participate in Video Division (7 August). But at the same time, 11 nations who have participated in Stage division will also participate in this event too, a total of 28 nations. On August 1, the WCS Organizing Committee announced that Finland unable send representatives to the stage division but still participating in the video division. And Saudi Arabia's participation in only video divisions has been canceled, total of countries participating to only 27 nations. The WCS Championship broadcast live was addition a new on Twitter And Locipo (Video Division Only). The first year WCS have grand champion two categories by Stage Division, Video Division And for the first time that the same nation has been got runner-up 2nd from both categories. Later 3 – 4 September A WCS Exhibition Event will be hosted for the first time in outside of Japan in Riyadh, Saudi Arabia called "World Cosplay Summit Exhibition Gamers8!!". Bangladesh, Czech Republic, Egypt, Lebanon and Poland joined the WCSxGamers8 event (not as WCS member countries). It is the first time that Colombia, Latvia has sent a joint representative after being unable to do so in 2021. The representatives are all alumni over the years, including the most recent representative and some representatives has been direct invite by WCS.By competing in such events, the WCS does not have an official live broadcast.

=== 2023-2025 ===
In 2023, Austria, Malaysia and Portugal returned to participate after being absent in 2021.The WCS organizing committee had set the competition to be just Stage performance as before.It was announced that there were 34 countries/regions, but later the Philippines withdrew from the competition bringing the number of participating nations/regions to 33 only.Later August 28-28, the WCS exhibition will be held again in Riyadh, Saudi Arabia called "Gamers8 Cosplay Cup supported by World Cosplay Summit". Argentina, Bangladesh, Croatia, Czech Republic, Hungary, Iraq, Mauritius, Mongolia, Morocco, Panama, Peru, Qatar, Serbia and Slovakia joined the WCSxGamers8 event (not as WCS member countries). It is the first time that Myanmar has sent a joint representative after being unable to do so in 2019, bringing the number of participating nations/region to 45. This competition still adheres to the rules of the WCS competition, but this competition, each national representative allowed the use of dialog and scenarios from Western media. which is different from the normal that it has to be a media from Japanese only.And this is the first time that WCS official YouTube channel has broadcast live competition in Saudi Arabia. Just like the WCS Championship in Japan. But due to some problems, the representative from Lebanon will not be able to perform on stage, but will still participate in activities on stage with representatives of all nations.

In 2024, The WCS organizing committee has announced that the video division will return and renamed the World Cinematic Cosplay Summit and change to online event competition on June 8–9 and broadcast live on officially on Facebook, Twitch, X (Twitter) and YouTube, while the WCS Championship will remain on its original schedule in August.The participating countries include 19 original member nations.The first day was a competition to select the top 5 representatives from the wild card group to compete with the 19 member nations in the next day. Each country could send more than 1 team, but in the end, the competition ended with 6 representatives because the bottom 2 teams had the same score.The WCCS champions who win the tournament will be invited to participate in the WCs events in August. Czech Republic and Mongolia joined WCS as member countries.bringing the number of participating nations/regions to 36.

in 2025, Bolivia, Peru and Poland joined WCS and Kuwait returned to participate, bringing the number of participating nations/regions to 41.This is the first year that a special live broadcast of the costume judging was held before the championship day and the highest costume score was announced before the Grand Champion and two runners-up were announced.After competition ended, The WCS organizing committee announced that the 2026 event would be the last year to be held in August, and from 2027, it would be held in November.

in 2026, Ecuador joined WCS and Hong Kong, Trinidad and Tobago and South Africa returned to participate.Vietnam were unable to send representatives for this year, bringing the number of participating nations/regions to 40.the last year to be held in July and August

in 2027, Argentina and Slovakia joined WCS.Puerto Rico returned to participateThe First year to be held in November.

==== Administration ====
===== Regulations =====
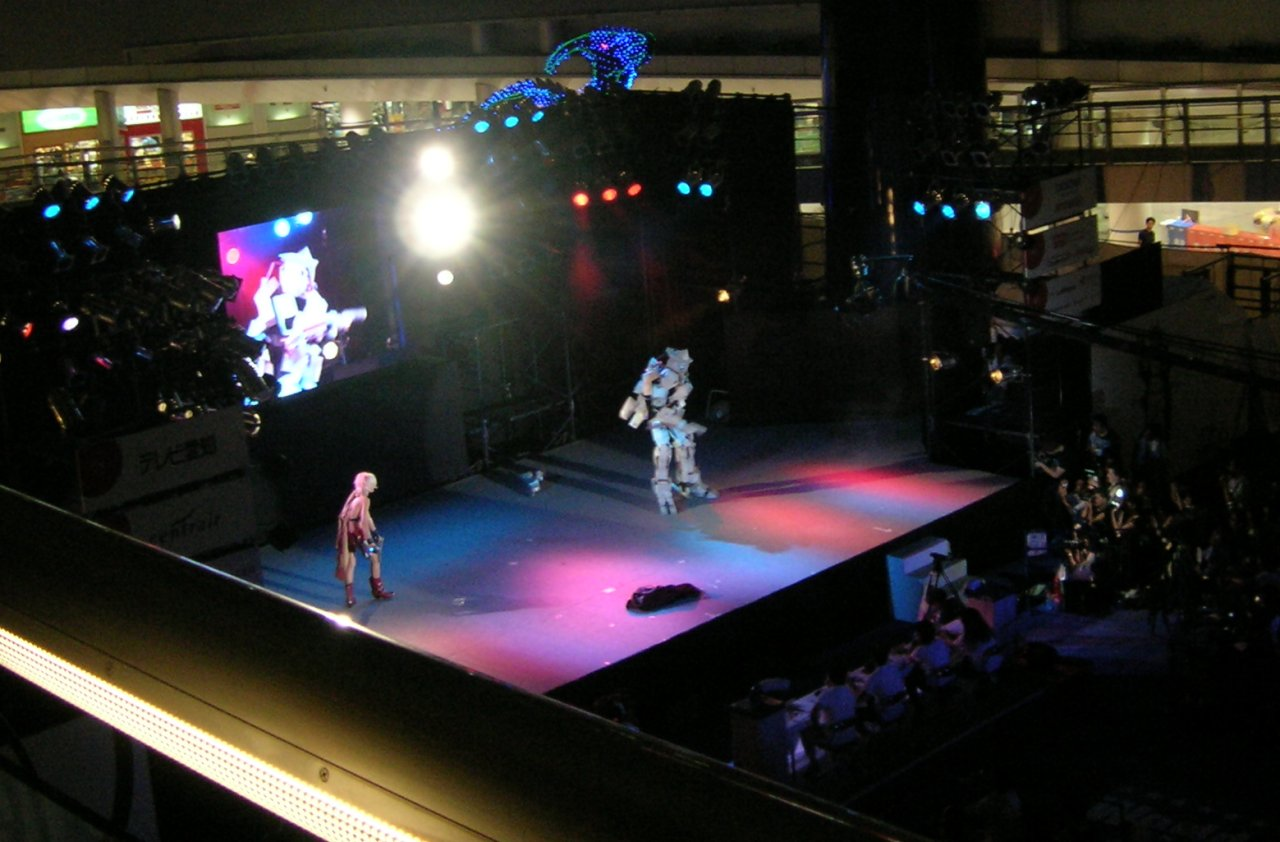
In 2008, performance by Brazilian cosplayers, the Grand Champion of the year

Regulations of the preliminaries for each country are decided by the event in which the respective preliminaries takes place. The following are participation regulations of the WCS Championship (finals) in Japan

===== Participant regulations (for WCS 2012) =====
Sources:

1. Each country will be represented by one team of two cosplayers.

2. The costumes must be from Japanese anime, manga, and tokusatsu.

- Dojinshi and unique characters from live-action movies based on anime or manga are not permitted (i.e. Dragonball Evolution, etc.).
- When doing a costume from a game, the character must be recognizably Japanese (i.e. not a Disney or Star Wars character even though the game may be made in Japan).

3. Cosplay costumes are to be hand-made.

- It is permissible for family and friends to help with costumes, but the contestants should be actively involved in the construction process.

4. Prospective entrants must be able to travel to Japan for about one week from the end of July to early August for the World Cosplay Summit Championship.

5. Participating minors must have consent of a guardian (rules may vary depending on the preliminary rules in different countries).

6. Contestants must participate in a positive manner in order to ensure the success of the World Cosplay Summit.

7. Legal Documents (i.e. passport application, official documentation, etc.) must be prepared and submitted as quickly as possible at the request of the WCS sponsor (TV Aichi).

8. Media such as TV programs, Internet homepages, newspapers, magazines, etc. may use photos and images of the preliminary contests prior to the World Cosplay Summit. On these occasions, compensation will not be furnished.

9. All image rights in all media exposure, such as news from TV programs and other assorted media involved with the World Cosplay Summit, promotional activities in print media as well as events and performances, and announcements of the Cosplay Summit both prior and during the event, will be attributed to TV Aichi.

10. After the World Cosplay Summit, images, photographs, footage, programs broadcast, Internet homepages and DVDs, etc. of the contestants will come under the jurisdiction of TV Aichi. Compensation will not be furnished for such images used by the media.

===== Preparation: rules and considerations =====
1. A minimum of three costumes must be brought to Japan: one for the Parade, one for the Championship, and one for media appearances.

2. In the Cosplay Championship, the costumes of the characters must be from the same Japanese manga, anime, video game or tokusatsu series.

- It is not necessary to coordinate costumes for the Parade or otherwise.

3. All equipment, costumes and props for the Cosplay Championship performance are limited to a maximum weight of 40 kg (88 lb) combined for both performers.

4. All large props set on stage before the Cosplay Championship performance begins are limited to a maximum weight of 10 kg (22 lb). Prop dimensions are limited to 2,100 mm (83 in) in height, 2,100 mm (83 in) in width and 900 mm (35 in) in depth.

5. All large props set on stage are limited to a maximum of 3 items. Dimensions of hand held props carried onto the stage must be relayed to WCS head office in written form and accompanied by photographs.

6. It is not permitted to directly copy original drawings or logos to your equipment or props.

7. You are required to bear the cost of any overweight luggage charges when shipping costumes and other items. It is not possible to send them to Japan by air or ship beforehand.

8. Please prepare your own music for your performance. A performance sheet stating what you will perform is to be submitted in advance. The use of voice actors voices from original works in your music is prohibited.

9. Please send the documents and sound file at latest one month before the date of the Cosplay Championship.

===== Championship performances =====
1. Only handmade costume

2. The costumes must be from Japanese anime, manga, and tokusatsu.

3. The Stage Performance team must in group 2 judging time is 2.30 min for performance

4. Background screen can be used as a stage direction

5. The ranking is determined by the total score of the Character Judging and the Stage Performance Judging

===== Video championship performances (2021–2022) =====
1. The championship a special "online" edition (2021)

2. The national team will not be coming to Japan (2021)

3. Videos under 2 minutes and 30 seconds, the basic video editing must be done by the representatives, however adding CG or visual effects done by someone other than the representatives are allowed with credit to them.

4. Pair of 2 people (use of extras allowed)

5. Costumes are handmade, no weight or size restrictions

6. Music used in the video must be played or created by representatives if it is music that would otherwise be subject to rights management by JASRAC, or it must be copyright-free music and sound clips.

7. The use of copyrighted background music or the voices of voice actors from original works and the copying or tracing of scenes or images appearing in original works for use in the videos, and sources, where the copyright holder is someone other than the representative team, is not permitted

==== Judging ====
===== Semi-final (for 2016–2018 and Nagoya Round 2019) =====
The Semi-final judges are a panel of usually organizer from participating nations/region, selected so that they are not judging the same group that contains their own team. Judging criteria use the same championship criteria apply as 2016.

===== Tokyo Round (WCS 2019) =====
The Tokyo judges are a panel of usually organizer from participating nations/region, selected so that they are not judging the same group that contains their own team. Judging criteria have a maximum total of 25 points for (a) Costume stage presence (50 points) and (b) Fidelity towards the original (50 points)

===== Championship =====
Judges are a panel of usually guest judges from the anime, manga and cosplay community.

In Early – 2015, Judging criteria have a maximum total of 25 points for (a) Performance (10 points), level of performance, inventiveness, entertainment, (b) Costume (10 points), design, faithfulness to the original characters costume, and (c)Fidelity to Original (5 points), level of faithfulness of the performance towards the original story and characters. At a later time has been change costume score to 15 points make a maximum total of 30 points

In 2016, Costume scoring criteria has been changed divided into costume craftsmanship (10 points) by organizers (organizer from participating nations/region, selected so that they are not judging the same group that contains their own team.) and the costume impact on stage (5 points)

In 2017, Costume impact on stage has been changed to Costume stage expression

In 2018, Judging criteria for all scores has been increased by 10 times.

In 2019, Costume Craftsmanship has been changed to Character Judging

In 2021, the hybrid year, the criteria were: (a) character judging, comprising costume precision (30 points), costume quality (10 points) and technique (10 points), and (b) video judging (100 points), comprising conception (45 points), acting (45 points), and "X-factor" (10 points).

In 2022, This is the first year a competition is divided into two categories, making it two Categories of criteria. Stage Division the criteria were: (a) character judging (100 points), comprising costume precision (40 points), costume quality (40 points) and technique (20 points), and (b) stage judging (100 points), comprising performance (50 points), acting・stage proficiency (20 points), Costume stage presence (20 points), and "X-factor" (10 points). Video Division use the same criteria apply as 2021.

In 2023, the judging criteria for stage performances will be based on the same criteria as in 2022.

===== World Cinematic Cosplay Summit =====
Judges are a panel of usually guest judges from the anime, manga and cosplay community.

In 2024, the judging criteria for WCCS will be based on the same video division criteria.

== List of guest judges ==
Year	Judges
2005	Leiji Matsumoto; Hironobu Kageyama; Ippongi Bang; Akifumi Takayanagi (TV Aichi); Shin Nagai (Tokyo Mode Gakuin)
2006	Go Nagai; Hiroshi Kitadani; Essai Ushijima (Cosplay critic); Yuji Tokita (MOFA)
2007	Monkey Punch; Ichirou Mizuki; Essai Ushijima (Cosplay critic); Yuji Tokita (MOFA); Ken Nagata (MLIT)
2008	Yumiko Igarashi; Rica Matsumoto; 10 general judge
2009	Tōru Furuya; Go Nagai; Ichirou Mizuki; Hamada Britney
2010	Tōru Furuya; Hironobu Kageyama; Himeka; Hiroyuki Kobayashi (Video game nnd anime television series Producer from Capcom); Nobuyuki Takahashi (Inventor of the word cosplay)
2011	Tōru Furuya; JAM Project (Hironobu Kageyama, Masaaki Endo, Hiroshi Kitadani, Masami Okui and Yoshiki Fukuyama); Takaaki Kitani (President, Bushiroad); Inui Tatsumi (Site administrator of Cure); Masaaki Nagase (Editor-in-chief, Tokai Walker)
2012	Tōru Furuya; Go Nagai; Inui Tatsumi (Site administrator of Cure); May'n; Rica Matsumoto
2013	Tōru Furuya; Tomokazu Sugita; Inui Tatsumi (Site administrator of Cure); Mel Kishida (illustrator); Ikenotani Ken (ACOS Producer)
2014	Tōru Furuya; Mika Kanai; Mel Kishida (illustrator); Inui Tatsumi (Site administrator of Cure); Andrea Vesnaver (WCS 2013 Champion Italy Representative); Dr. Oh (Bushiroad Producer); Azuma Fukashi (TV Tokyo Producer)
2015	Tōru Furuya; Inui Tatsumi (Site administrator of Cure); Nek (WCS 2014 Champion Russia Representative); Nichi (WCS 2014 Champion Russia Representative); Nakazato Ikuko (Kodansha Nakayoshi Aria Editorial Department); Nao Hirasawa (Animation Producer of Ultra Super Pictures Ltd.); Ryutaro Ichimura (Dragon Quest Producer of Square Enix); Tomokazu Tashiro (Composer); Åsa Ekström (Swedish Cartoonist)
2016	Tōru Furuya; Inui Tatsumi (Site administrator of Cure); Juan Carlos (WCS 2015 Champion Mexico Representative); Shema Arroyo (Jose Maria) (WCS 2015 Champion Mexico Representative); Keishu Ando (Japanese Cartoonist Creation of Hentai Kamen); Kahoru Yasuda (Representative of Comiket) and more (1st Stage Semi-finals Only)
2017	Tōru Furuya; Inui Tatsumi (Site administrator of Cure); Sumire Uesaka; Kazuyuki Okitsu; Minami Tsuda; Sayaka Sasaki; Rian CYD (WCS 2016 Champion Indonesia Representative); Frea Mai (WCS 2016 Champion Indonesia Representative); Nao Hirasawa (ID-0 Animation Producer); Yuiji Yoriko (ACOS Producer); Mizuno Koichi (Event Organizer In Nagoya); Kazuki Foo Ming Wei (President of Eight Ministry "Malaysia" South East Asia); Makoto Shigeno (CosMode Thailand Editor) and more (1st Stage Semi-finals Only)
2018	Tōru Furuya; Inui Tatsumi (Site administrator of Cure); Ichirou Mizuki; Daisuke Tsuda (journalist); Arina Tanemura; Suguru Sugita (Shueisha Weekly JUMP Media Relations of ONE PIECE); Natsuko Tateishi (Toei Animation); Nao Hirasawa (Anime Producer); Mizuno Koichi (Nippon Domannaka Festival); Yoriko Iuchi (Acts Executive Producer); Xue Yan Xue (WCS 2017 Champion China Representative); Tian Tian (WCS 2017 Champion China Representative); Eliot (WCS Photo Championship 2018 Grand Prix From Mexico); Yuyi (WCS Video Championship 2018 Grand Prix From France); Shirou Tang (Germany Representative); Kazuki Foo Ming Wei (President of Eight Ministry "Malaysia" South East Asia); Ayman Ali (UAE Representative) and more
2019	Tōru Furuya; Inui Tatsumi (Site administrator of Cure); Haruhiko Mikimoto (Illustrator, character designer “Job Tribes”); Hisayoshi Hirasawa (Yatogame-chan Kansatsu Nikki Animation Director); Nao Yagi (Announcer); Ryuji Kuwahara (Hakone Ekiden gen 2nd god of the mountains marathon runner); Miki Kitagawa; Junko Iuchi (Akos Corporation Executive Producer); Ed Lalo Peralta (WCS 2018 Champion Mexico Representative); Luis Sáenz Gamboa (WCS 2018 Champion Mexico Representative); Yuegene Fay (WCS Photo Championship 2019 Grand Prix From Thailand); Hummy Cosplay (WCS Video Championship 2019 Grand Prix From Spain); Diana Tolin (USA Representative); Shirou Tang (Germany Representative); Kazuki Foo Ming Wei (President of Eight Ministry "Malaysia" South East Asia); Ayman Ali (UAE Representative) and more (1st Stage Tokyo Round and 2nd Stage Nagoya Round)
2020	A.K. Wirru (2019 Champion Australia Representative); Banana Cospboys (2018 Champion Mexico Team); BOYS AND MEN; Chris Glen (Announcer); K (2019 Champion Australia Representative); KANAME☆ KaoruLily (2019 Netherlands Representative); Mahio (2017 2nd Runner-up Japan Representative); Mariko (2006 1st Runner-up, 2017 2nd Runner-up Japan Representative); Matsuri nine. Maurício Somenzari (WCS 2006, 2011 Champion Brazil Representative); Osamu Masuyama; Reika Arikawa; Tatsumi Inui (Site administrator of Cure); Tōru Furuya; Yaya Han; Yuriko Tiger; YO!YO!YOSUKE (Announcer) and more
2021	Asaka (musician); Asu; BMK (Big Monster Kite); BOYS AND MEN; Chirs Glenn (Announcer); Daisuke Nakamoto (Voice Actor); Dakara; Eri Sakazaki (Voice Actress); Faras; Guren; Hana Isogai (Voice Actress); Hideaki Omura (Aichi prefectural governor); Iwori (Voice Actor); Komazawa Isolation (Video Creator); MATSURI nine. Michi Yokoi (Announcer); Miho Mashiro (Voice Actress); Mikeneko Kyouju; Miki Yakata (Voice Actress); Monster; Nagoya Cosplay Host Town PR Team; Natsuki Ochiai (Voice Actress); Nishizuma; Reika Arikawa; Shingo Yoneyama (Voice Actor); Shoto Mizukami (Voice Actor); Tatsumi Inui (Site administrator of Cure); Tōru Furuya; USAKO (Announcer); K (2019 Champion Australia Representative); A.K Wirru (2019 Champion Australia Representative); YO!YO!YOSUKE (Announcer); Yudai Noda (Voice Actor); Yuto Arai (Voice Actor) and more
2022	Tatsumi Inui (Site administrator of Cure); Tōru Furuya; Reika Arikawa; K (2019 Champion Australia Representative); A.K Wirru (2019 Champion Australia Representative); Calssara (2021 Champion Germany Representative); Elffi (2021 Champion Germany Representative); Masuyama Osamu (Animation art director); Sakai Misako (Tokyo Comic Convention Co., Ltd. Executive) (Video Division Only); Jun Yamanaka (Tokyo Comic Convention Co., Ltd. Vice Chairman, Sales Director) (Stage Division Only); Sora Tokui (Video Division Only) and more
2022 Exhibition Event	Vega (2017 United Arab Emirates Representative); Nao Hirasawa (Anime Producer); Reika Arikawa; Shappi Workshop (Polish Cosplayer); Yuegene Fay (2007, 2009 Thailand Representative); Yuji Koi (2017 Vietnam Representative)
2023	Tōru Furuya; Yuji Horii (Video Game Designer); Nao Hirasawa (Anime Producer); Yaya Han; Yuegene Fay (2007, 2009 Thailand Representative); Beryl (2022 Stage Division Champion France Representative); Hazariel (2022 Stage Division Champion France Representative); Yumidun (2022 Video Division Champion Sweden Representative); Birthbysleep (2022 Video Division Champion Sweden Representative); Yuki Suetsugu; Chiitan (OTAKU JUDGE Anime Category); Yuzukichi (OTAKU JUDGE Manga Category); Toukarin (OTAKU JUDGE Game Category); Moimoi (OTAKU JUDGE Tokusatsu Category,2022 Japan Representative); Pains (OTAKU JUDGE Cosplay Category); Kazuki Foo Ming Wei (Chairman of EM Foundation "Malaysia" South East Asia); Ayman Ali (UAE Representative) and more
2023 Cosplay Cup	Yumaki Monster (2022 EX Champion,2018 Indonesia Representative); Rian CYD (2022 EX Champion,2014 Indonesia Representative); Yuegene Fay (2007, 2009 Thailand Representative); Naythero (French Cosplayer); Miho (2014 Philippines Representative); Yuegene Fay (2007, 2009 Thailand Representative); Nanase Meron (2022 Japan Representative); Vega (2017 United Arab Emirates Representative)
2024 WCCS	Day 1 Benjamin Zafrany (Cosplay International Competition Organizer); Diana Toline (American Cosplayer & WCS Staft Member) (Day 1&2); Fran (WCS Japan Organizer); Day 2 Reika Arikawa; Yumidun (2022 Video Division Champion Sweden Representative); Birthbysleep (2022 Video Division Champion Sweden Representative); Rescue the princess! (Canadian Cosplay Videographer); Ludus Cosplay (South African Costume Maker); Xiao Ying (Chinese Photo-Videographer); K (2019 Champion Australia Representative)
2024	Yosuke Saito (Game producer); Yoko Taro (Game Director); Hiro Mashima; Kuniya Sawamura (Kabuki Actor); Kenji Hiramatsu (Composer And Arranger); Tomokazu Tashiro (Lyricist And Composer); Kenji Nojima; Clood (2023 Champion UK Representative); Tsupo (2023 Champion UK Representative); Moimoi (OTAKU JUDGE Tokusatsu Category,2022 Japan Representative); Yuzukiti (OTAKU JUDGE Anime Category); RiuRiu (OTAKU JUDGE Game Category); Hayato (OTAKU JUDGE Tokusatsu Category); Pains (OTAKU JUDGE Cosplay Category); Kairi (2024 WCCS Champion Poland Representative); Dorian Makbeth(2024 WCCS Champion Poland Representative); Saber (2023 Cosplay Cup Champion,2023 Latvia Representative); Sayochuu (2023 Cosplay Cup Champion,2023 Latvia Representative) and more
2025	Toshio Furukawa; Onoe Kikugorō VIII (Kabuki Actor); Onoe Kikunosuke VI (Kabuki Actor); Sunghoo Park (Director And Animator); Tadashi Sudo (Journalist); Akira Yamaoka (Composer); D japanese (Creator); Mioshi (2024 Champion Japan Representative); Mamemayo (2024 Champion Japan Representative)
2026	Toshio Furukawa; Shoko Nakagawa; Kiyoshiro Sawamura II (Kabuki Actor); Taro Maki (Producer Patlabor: The Movie and In This Corner of the World); Yosuke Saito (Executive Producer Square Enix Co., Ltd.); Tomokazu Tashiro (Music Producer / Songwriter); McKayla (2025 Champion USA Representative); Heidi (2025 Champion USA Representative)

== Attending countries ==
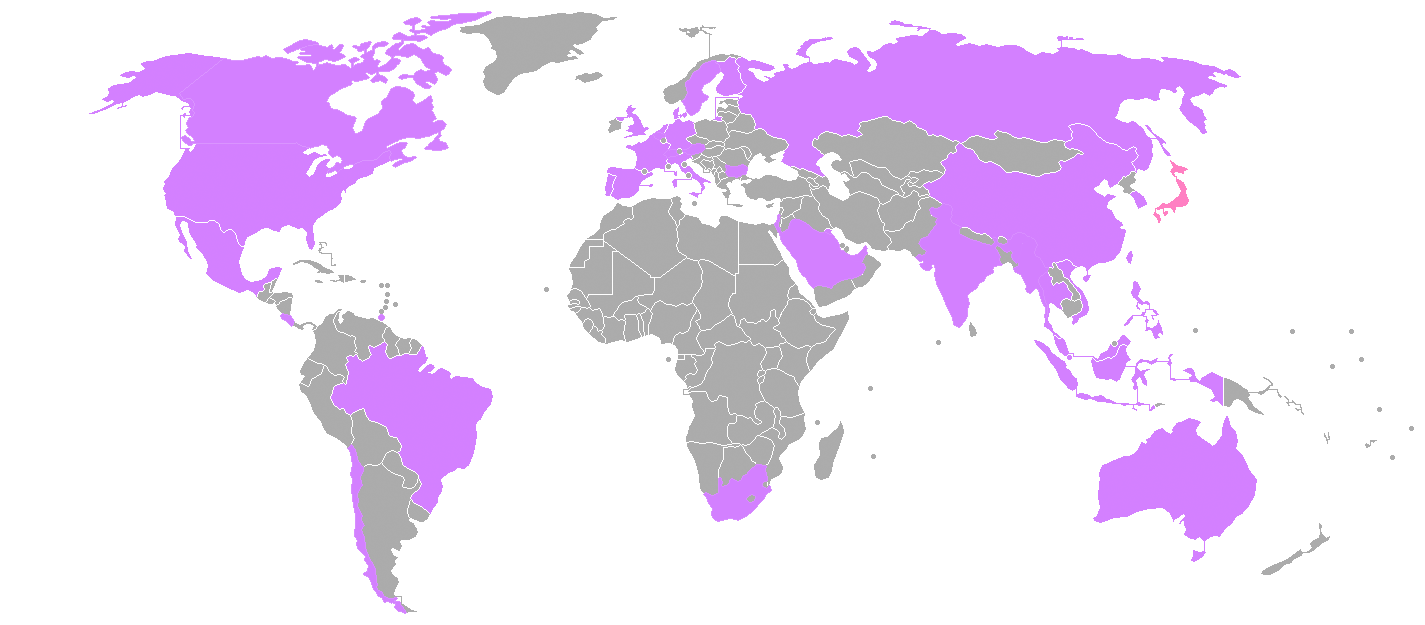
Countries that have at one time participated in the World Cosplay Summit (as of 2021)

Attending countries in bold indicate first attendance for that year:

Year	No.	Attending countries	Guest commentator/s	Date	Venue
2003	4	**France**, **Germany**, **Italy**, **Japan**	–	October 12	Rose Court Hotel
2004	5	France, Germany, Italy, Japan, **United States**	–	August 1	Ōsu shopping area
2005	7	**China**, France, Germany, Italy, Japan, **Spain**, United States	Tōru Furuya; Tomoe Shinohara	July 31	Ōsu shopping area
2005	7	**China**, France, Germany, Italy, Japan, **Spain**, United States	Tōru Furuya; Tomoe Shinohara	August 7	Expo Dome
2006	9	**Brazil**, China, France, Germany, Italy, Japan, **Singapore**, Spain, **Thailand**	Tōru Furuya	August 5	Ōsu shopping area
2006	9	**Brazil**, China, France, Germany, Italy, Japan, **Singapore**, Spain, **Thailand**	Tōru Furuya	August 6	Oasis 21
2007	12	Brazil, China, **Denmark**, France, Germany, Italy, Japan, **Mexico**, Singapore, **South Korea**, Spain, Thailand	Tōru Furuya; Shoko Nakagawa	August 4	Ōsu shopping area
2007	12	Brazil, China, **Denmark**, France, Germany, Italy, Japan, **Mexico**, Singapore, **South Korea**, Spain, Thailand	Tōru Furuya; Shoko Nakagawa	August 5	Oasis 21
2008	13	Brazil, China, Denmark, France, Germany, Italy, Japan, Mexico, Singapore, South Korea, Spain, Thailand, United States	Tōru Furuya; Natsuki Katō	August 2	Ōsu shopping area
2008	13	Brazil, China, Denmark, France, Germany, Italy, Japan, Mexico, Singapore, South Korea, Spain, Thailand, United States	Tōru Furuya; Natsuki Katō	August 3	Oasis 21
2009	15	**Australia**, Brazil, China, Denmark, **Finland**, France, Germany, Italy, Japan, Mexico, Singapore, South Korea, Spain, Thailand, United States	–	August 1	Ōsu shopping area
2009	15	**Australia**, Brazil, China, Denmark, **Finland**, France, Germany, Italy, Japan, Mexico, Singapore, South Korea, Spain, Thailand, United States	–	August 2	Oasis 21
2010	15	Australia, Brazil, China, Denmark, Finland, France, Germany, Italy, Japan, Mexico, Singapore, South Korea, Spain, Thailand, United States	–	July 31	Ōsu shopping area
2010	15	Australia, Brazil, China, Denmark, Finland, France, Germany, Italy, Japan, Mexico, Singapore, South Korea, Spain, Thailand, United States	–	August 1	Oasis 21
2011	17	Australia, Brazil, China, Denmark, Finland, France, Germany, Italy, Japan, **Malaysia**, Mexico, **Netherlands**, Singapore, South Korea, Spain, Thailand, United States	–	August 6	Ōsu shopping area
2011	17	Australia, Brazil, China, Denmark, Finland, France, Germany, Italy, Japan, **Malaysia**, Mexico, **Netherlands**, Singapore, South Korea, Spain, Thailand, United States	–	August 7	Oasis 21
2012	22	Australia, Brazil, China, Denmark, Finland, France, Germany, **Hong Kong** (Observer), **Indonesia**, Italy, Japan, Malaysia, Mexico, Netherlands, **Russia**, Singapore, South Korea, Spain, **Taiwan** (Observer), Thailand, **United Kingdom**, United States	–	August 4	Oasis 21
2012	22	Australia, Brazil, China, Denmark, Finland, France, Germany, **Hong Kong** (Observer), **Indonesia**, Italy, Japan, Malaysia, Mexico, Netherlands, **Russia**, Singapore, South Korea, Spain, **Taiwan** (Observer), Thailand, **United Kingdom**, United States	–	August 5	Ōsu shopping area
2013	24	Australia, Brazil, China, Denmark, Finland, France, Germany, Hong Kong (Observer), Indonesia, Italy, Japan, Malaysia, Mexico, Netherlands, **Philippines** (Observer), Russia,Singapore, South Korea, Spain, **Taiwan** (Observer), Thailand, United Kingdom, United States, **Vietnam** (Observer)	–	August 3	Oasis 21
2013	24	Australia, Brazil, China, Denmark, Finland, France, Germany, Hong Kong (Observer), Indonesia, Italy, Japan, Malaysia, Mexico, Netherlands, **Philippines** (Observer), Russia,Singapore, South Korea, Spain, **Taiwan** (Observer), Thailand, United Kingdom, United States, **Vietnam** (Observer)	–	August 2	Ōsu shopping area
2014	26	Australia, Brazil, China, Denmark, Finland, France, Germany, Hong Kong, Indonesia, Italy, Japan, **Kuwait** (Observer), Malaysia, Mexico, Netherlands, Philippines (Observer), **Portugal** (Observer), Russia, Singapore, South Korea, Spain, Taiwan, Thailand, United Kingdom, United States, Vietnam (Observer)	–	August 2	Aichi Arts Center
2014	26	Australia, Brazil, China, Denmark, Finland, France, Germany, Hong Kong, Indonesia, Italy, Japan, **Kuwait** (Observer), Malaysia, Mexico, Netherlands, Philippines (Observer), **Portugal** (Observer), Russia, Singapore, South Korea, Spain, Taiwan, Thailand, United Kingdom, United States, Vietnam (Observer)	–	August 3	Ōsu shopping area
2015	28	Australia, Brazil, **Canada** (Observer), China, Denmark, Finland, France, Germany, Hong Kong, Indonesia, Italy, Japan, Kuwait, Malaysia, Mexico, Netherlands, Philippines,Portugal, Russia, Singapore,South Korea, Spain, **Sweden** (Observer), Taiwan, Thailand, United Kingdom,United States, Vietnam	–	August 1	Aichi Arts Center
2015	28	Australia, Brazil, **Canada** (Observer), China, Denmark, Finland, France, Germany, Hong Kong, Indonesia, Italy, Japan, Kuwait, Malaysia, Mexico, Netherlands, Philippines,Portugal, Russia, Singapore,South Korea, Spain, **Sweden** (Observer), Taiwan, Thailand, United Kingdom,United States, Vietnam	–	August 2	Ōsu shopping area
2016	30	Australia, Brazil, Canada, China, Denmark, Finland, France, Germany, Hong Kong, **India**, Indonesia, Italy, Japan, Kuwait, Malaysia, Mexico, Netherlands, Philippines, Portugal, Russia, Singapore, South Korea, Spain, Sweden, **Switzerland**, Taiwan, Thailand, United Kingdom, United States, Vietnam	–	August 6	Aichi Arts Center
2016	30	Australia, Brazil, Canada, China, Denmark, Finland, France, Germany, Hong Kong, **India**, Indonesia, Italy, Japan, Kuwait, Malaysia, Mexico, Netherlands, Philippines, Portugal, Russia, Singapore, South Korea, Spain, Sweden, **Switzerland**, Taiwan, Thailand, United Kingdom, United States, Vietnam	–	August 7	Ōsu shopping area, Aichi Arts Center
2017	34	Australia, **Belgium**, Brazil, Canada, **Chile**, China, Denmark, Finland, France, Germany, Hong Kong, India, Indonesia, Italy, Japan, Malaysia, Mexico, **Myanmar**, Netherlands, Philippines, Portugal, **Puerto Rico**, Russia, Singapore, South Korea, Spain, Sweden, Switzerland, Taiwan, Thailand,**United Arab Emirates**, United Kingdom, United States, Vietnam	–	August 5	Aichi Arts Center
2017	34	Australia, **Belgium**, Brazil, Canada, **Chile**, China, Denmark, Finland, France, Germany, Hong Kong, India, Indonesia, Italy, Japan, Malaysia, Mexico, **Myanmar**, Netherlands, Philippines, Portugal, **Puerto Rico**, Russia, Singapore, South Korea, Spain, Sweden, Switzerland, Taiwan, Thailand,**United Arab Emirates**, United Kingdom, United States, Vietnam	–	August 6	Ōsu shopping area, Aichi Arts Center
2018	36	Australia, Belgium, Brazil, **Bulgaria**, Canada, Chile, China, **Costa Rica**, Denmark, Finland, France, Germany, Hong Kong, India, Indonesia, Italy, Japan, Kuwait, Malaysia, Mexico, Myanmar, Netherlands, Philippines, Portugal, Russia, Singapore, **South Africa**, South Korea, Spain, Sweden, Switzerland, Taiwan, Thailand, United Kingdom, United States, Vietnam	–	August 3	Central Park
2018	36	Australia, Belgium, Brazil, **Bulgaria**, Canada, Chile, China, **Costa Rica**, Denmark, Finland, France, Germany, Hong Kong, India, Indonesia, Italy, Japan, Kuwait, Malaysia, Mexico, Myanmar, Netherlands, Philippines, Portugal, Russia, Singapore, **South Africa**, South Korea, Spain, Sweden, Switzerland, Taiwan, Thailand, United Kingdom, United States, Vietnam	–	August 5	Ōsu shopping area, Dolphins Arena
2019	40	Australia, **Austria**, Belgium, Brazil, Bulgaria, Canada, Chile,China, Costa Rica, Denmark, Finland, France, Germany, Hong Kong, India, Indonesia, **Israel**, Italy, Japan, Malaysia, Mexico, Myanmar, Netherlands, Philippines, Portugal, Russia, **Saudi Arabia**, Singapore, South Africa, South Korea, Spain, Sweden, Switzerland, Taiwan, Thailand, **Trinidad and Tobago**,United Arab Emirates, United Kingdom, United States, Vietnam	–	July 27	Tokyo Dome City
2019	40	Australia, **Austria**, Belgium, Brazil, Bulgaria, Canada, Chile,China, Costa Rica, Denmark, Finland, France, Germany, Hong Kong, India, Indonesia, **Israel**, Italy, Japan, Malaysia, Mexico, Myanmar, Netherlands, Philippines, Portugal, Russia, **Saudi Arabia**, Singapore, South Africa, South Korea, Spain, Sweden, Switzerland, Taiwan, Thailand, **Trinidad and Tobago**,United Arab Emirates, United Kingdom, United States, Vietnam	–	August 3	Aichi Arts Center
2019	40	Australia, **Austria**, Belgium, Brazil, Bulgaria, Canada, Chile,China, Costa Rica, Denmark, Finland, France, Germany, Hong Kong, India, Indonesia, **Israel**, Italy, Japan, Malaysia, Mexico, Myanmar, Netherlands, Philippines, Portugal, Russia, **Saudi Arabia**, Singapore, South Africa, South Korea, Spain, Sweden, Switzerland, Taiwan, Thailand, **Trinidad and Tobago**,United Arab Emirates, United Kingdom, United States, Vietnam	–	August 4	Ōsu shopping area, Aichi Arts Center
2020	24 hour global online broadcast – August 1 – Aichi TV, Osu Studio				
2021	30	The national representative no coming and send video only Australia, Belgium, Brazil, Bulgaria, Canada, Chile, Finland, France, Germany, Hong Kong, India, Indonesia, Israel, Italy, Japan, Mexico, Netherlands, Philippines, Russia, Saudi Arabia (Observer), South Africa, Spain, Sweden, Switzerland, Taiwan, Thailand, **Ukraine**, United Kingdom, United States, Vietnam	–	August 8	Oasis 21
2022	28	All national representatives will participating in video division but have 10 national representatives only participating both a stage division (S) and video division (V) Australia (S&V), Belgium (S&V), Bulgaria, Canada, Chile, China, Denmark, Finland, France (S&V), Germany (S&V), Hong Kong, India, Indonesia, Italy, Japan, Mexico, Netherlands (S&V), Philippines (S&V), Saudi Arabia (Withdraw in 1/8/2022), South Korea, Spain (S&V), Sweden, Switzerland (S&V), Taiwan,Thailand (S&V), Trinidad and Tobago, United States, Vietnam (S&V)	–	August 6	Aichi Arts Center
2022	28		–	August 7	Oasis 21
2022 EX	39	Australia, **Bangladesh**, Belgium, Brazil, Bulgaria, Canada,Chile, China, **Colombia**, Costa Rica, **Czech Republic**, Denmark, **Egypt**, France, Germany, Hong Kong, India, Indonesia, Italy, Japan, Kuwait, **Latvia**, **Lebanon**, Malaysia, Mexico, Netherlands, Philippine, **Poland**, Saudi Arabia, Singapore, South Africa, South Korea, Spain, Switzerland, Taiwan, Thailand, United Arab Emirates, United Kingdom, Vietnam	–	September 3	Boulevard Riyadh City
2022 EX	39	Australia, **Bangladesh**, Belgium, Brazil, Bulgaria, Canada,Chile, China, **Colombia**, Costa Rica, **Czech Republic**, Denmark, **Egypt**, France, Germany, Hong Kong, India, Indonesia, Italy, Japan, Kuwait, **Latvia**, **Lebanon**, Malaysia, Mexico, Netherlands, Philippine, **Poland**, Saudi Arabia, Singapore, South Africa, South Korea, Spain, Switzerland, Taiwan, Thailand, United Arab Emirates, United Kingdom, Vietnam	–	September 4	Boulevard Riyadh City
2023	34	Australia, Austria, Belgium, Brazil, Bulgaria, Canada, China, Colombia, Egypt, Finland, France, Germany, India, Indonesia, Italy, Japan, Latvia, Malaysia, Mexico, Netherlands, Philippines (Withdraw in 15/6/2023), Portugal, Saudi Arabia, South Africa,South Korea, Spain, Sweden, Switzerland, Taiwan, Thailand, United Arab Emirates, United Kingdom, United States, Vietnam	–	August 5	Aichi Arts Center
2023	34	Australia, Austria, Belgium, Brazil, Bulgaria, Canada, China, Colombia, Egypt, Finland, France, Germany, India, Indonesia, Italy, Japan, Latvia, Malaysia, Mexico, Netherlands, Philippines (Withdraw in 15/6/2023), Portugal, Saudi Arabia, South Africa,South Korea, Spain, Sweden, Switzerland, Taiwan, Thailand, United Arab Emirates, United Kingdom, United States, Vietnam	–	August 6	Oasis 21
2023 Cosplay Cup	45	**Argentina**, Bangladesh, Belgium, Brazil, Bulgaria, Canada, Chile, China, Colombia, Costa Rica, **Croatia**, Czech Republic, Egypt, France, Hong Kong, **Hungary**, India, Indonesia, **Iraq**, Italy, Japan, Kuwait, Latvia, Lebanon, Malaysia, **Mauritius**, Mexico, **Mongolia**, **Morocco**, Myanmar, **Panama**, **Peru**, Philippine, Portugal, **Qatar**, Saudi Arabia, **Serbia**, Singapore, **Slovakia**, South Africa, South Korea, Taiwan, Thailand, United Arab Emirates, Vietnam	–	August 27	Boulevard Riyadh City
2023 Cosplay Cup	45	**Argentina**, Bangladesh, Belgium, Brazil, Bulgaria, Canada, Chile, China, Colombia, Costa Rica, **Croatia**, Czech Republic, Egypt, France, Hong Kong, **Hungary**, India, Indonesia, **Iraq**, Italy, Japan, Kuwait, Latvia, Lebanon, Malaysia, **Mauritius**, Mexico, **Mongolia**, **Morocco**, Myanmar, **Panama**, **Peru**, Philippine, Portugal, **Qatar**, Saudi Arabia, **Serbia**, Singapore, **Slovakia**, South Africa, South Korea, Taiwan, Thailand, United Arab Emirates, Vietnam	–	August 28	Boulevard Riyadh City
2024 WCCS	32	Australia, Bangladesh, Belgium, **Bolivia**, Brazil, Canada, Chile, Colombia, **Ecuador**, France, Germany, Indonesia, Iraq, Japan, Kuwait, Malaysia, Mexico, Panama, Peru, Philippines, Poland, Portugal, Russia, Saudi Arabia, South Korea, Spain, Sweden, Taiwan, Thailand, Ukraine, United Kingdom, United States	–	June 8	Commufa Esports Stadium Nagoya (Online Event)
2024 WCCS	32	Australia, Bangladesh, Belgium, **Bolivia**, Brazil, Canada, Chile, Colombia, **Ecuador**, France, Germany, Indonesia, Iraq, Japan, Kuwait, Malaysia, Mexico, Panama, Peru, Philippines, Poland, Portugal, Russia, Saudi Arabia, South Korea, Spain, Sweden, Taiwan, Thailand, Ukraine, United Kingdom, United States	–	June 9	Commufa Esports Stadium Nagoya (Online Event)
2024	36	Australia, Austria, Belgium, Brazil, Bulgaria, Canada, China, Costa Rica, Czech Republic, Egypt, Finland, France, Germany, India, Indonesia, Italy, Japan, Latvia, Malaysia,Mexico,Mongolia, Netherlands, Philippines , Portugal, Saudi Arabia, South Africa, South Korea, Spain, Sweden, Switzerland, Taiwan, Thailand, United Arab Emirates, United Kingdom, United States, Vietnam	–	August 3	Aichi Arts Center
2024	36	Australia, Austria, Belgium, Brazil, Bulgaria, Canada, China, Costa Rica, Czech Republic, Egypt, Finland, France, Germany, India, Indonesia, Italy, Japan, Latvia, Malaysia,Mexico,Mongolia, Netherlands, Philippines , Portugal, Saudi Arabia, South Africa, South Korea, Spain, Sweden, Switzerland, Taiwan, Thailand, United Arab Emirates, United Kingdom, United States, Vietnam	–	August 4	Oasis 21
2025	41	Australia, Austria, Belgium, Brazil, Bulgaria, Bolivia, Canada, China, Colombia, Costa Rica, Czech Republic, Egypt, Finland, France, Germany, India, Indonesia, Italy, Japan, Kuwait,Latvia, Malaysia, Mexico, Mongolia, Morocco, Netherlands, **Peru**, Philippines, Poland, Portugal, Saudi Arabia, South Korea,Spain,Sweden, Switzerland, Taiwan, Thailand, United Arab Emirates, United Kingdom, United States, Vietnam	–	August 3	Aichi Arts Center
2026	41	Australia, Austria, Belgium, Brazil, Bulgaria, Bolivia, Canada, China, Colombia, Costa Rica, Czech Republic,**Ecuador**, France, Hong Kong, India, Indonesia, Italy, Japan, Kuwait,Latvia, Malaysia, Mexico, Mongolia, Morocco, Netherlands, Peru, Philippines, Poland, Portugal, Saudi Arabia, South Africa, South Korea,Spain,Sweden, Switzerland, Taiwan, Thailand, Trinidad and Tobago, United Kingdom, United States, Vietnam (Withdraw)	–	August 2	Aichi Arts Center

== Results ==
Yearly results for the top awards:

Year	Grand Champion		Runner-up 1st		Runner-up 2nd		Special award from "brother"	
2005^{1}^{,}^{2}	(Italy)	Giorgia Vecchini (Individual, Over All Grand Champion); Francesca Dani (Over All Grand Champion); Emilia Fata Livia (Over All Grand Champion); Elena Fata Livia (Over All Grand Champion)					(Japan)	Nakamura-han/Nakamura Family
2006^{3}	(Brazil)	Maurício Somenzari L Olivas (Mah Psylocke); Mônica Somenzari L Olivas (Kawaii Aeris)	(Japan)	Mariko; Cyoko	(Italy)	Alessandro Leuti; Alessia de Magistris	(Japan)	Goldy Marg; Aoisakuya
2007	(France)	Damien Ratte; Isabelle Jeudy	(Japan)	Kikiwan; Naoki Shigure			(Mexico)	Linaloe Rodriguez Rivera (Linamoon); Alejandra Rodriguez Rivera (Yunnale)
2008	(Brazil)	Jéssica Moreira Rocha Campos (Pandy); Gabriel Niemietz Braz (Hyoga)	(China)	Zhao Chin; Zhang Li			(Japan)	Yui; Mino
2009	(Japan)	YuRi; RiE	(Spain)	Bereniç Serrano Vidal (Piruletosa); Laura Fernández Ramos (Madoka)			(United States)	Elizabeth Licata (fatwetdog); India Davis (Dia)
2010	(Italy)	Luca Buzzi; Giancarlo Di Pierro	(Brazil) (Thailand)	Gabrielle Christine Valerio; Gabriel Niemietz Braz (Hyoga) Orawan Aggavinate (Alexis Seiz); Patawikorn Uttisen (Pat)	(South Korea) (France)	Myungseon Lee; Suengyong Kong Laura Salviani (Nikita); Cecile Auclair (Sikay)	(Thailand)	Orawan Aggavinate (Alexis Seiz); Patawikorn Uttisen (Pat)
2011	(Brazil)	Maurício Somenzari Leite Olivas; Mônica Somenzari Leite Olivas	(Italy)	Marika Roncon; Daniela Maiorana	(China)	Deng Ya Qian; Zheng Jia Hong	(Australia)	Tessa Beattie; Jessica L. Allie
2012	(Japan)	Yukari Shimotsuki; Kaito	(Singapore)	Frank Koh (Raistlin03); Valerie Seng (ayatenshi)	(Indonesia)	Yesaya (Konnichi); Rizki (Zhuge)	(Singapore)	Frank Koh (Raistlin03); Valerie Seng (ayatenshi)
2013	(Italy)	Andrea Vesnaver; Massimo Barbera	(United States)	Cassandra May (Breathlessaire); Tiffany Tezna (Starlighthoney)	(Thailand)	Pongwat Honghiranrattana (Hisa Minuet); Chittaworn Veeraroj (Scarleta Win)	(United States)	Cassandra May (Breathlessaire); Tiffany Tezna (Starlighthoney)
2014	(Russia)	Nek (Neko-tin); Nichi	(Italy)	NadiaSK; MOGU	(Indonesia)	Dharma (Guriinko); Ryan (Ryan no Ryu)	(Denmark)	Shinji; TinYasuo
2015	(Mexico)	Juan Carlos Tolento (TWIIN Cosplay); Shema Arroyo (TWIIN Cosplay)	(Italy)	Akiba (Manuel Capitani); Luca Buzzi	(United States)	Ashley Rochelle (AlpacaAsh); Sarah R. (Yummy Gamorah)	(United States)	Ashley Rochelle (AlpacaAsh); Sarah R. (Yummy Gamorah)
2016	(Indonesia)	Rian CYD; Frea Mai	(Denmark)	Shinji; TinYasuo	(France)	LucioleS; Lyel	(Finland)	Jesmo; Yumi Koyuki
2017	(China)	Xue Yan Xue; Tian Tian	(Mexico)	Al Squall; Doritaa	(Japan)	Mahio; Mariko	(France)	Milou; Aluota
2018	(Mexico)	Banana Ed; Banana Luis	(Indonesia)	Yumaki; Machibun	(Thailand)	Jasper Z (Zei); Kutto	(Denmark)	Aik0hime; TinYasuo
2019	(Australia)	K Ameno Kitarou (A.K. Wirru)	(United States)	Joshua Hart Design; Garnet Runestar (Elrowiel)	(France)	Kalimsshar; SakuraFlame	(Germany)	Feder; Cita
2020	Championship not held due to COVID-19							
2021	(Germany)	Calssara; Elffi	(Italy)	Diaboliko Cosplay; Nero Cosplay	(United Kingdom)	Nomes (Nomes Cosplay); Minney (Be More Shonen)	(Philippines)	Jin (behindinfinity); AC Hernandez
2022	(France) (Sweden)	Beryl; Hazariel (Stage Division) Yumidun; Birthbysleep (Birthbysleeping) (Video Division)	(Australia) (Mexico)	Taigakunn; Natalie (Artemis) (Stage Division) Rizel cosplay Sorato (Sora to cosplay) (Video Division)	(Thailand)	Thames Malerose; Jasper Z (Zei) (Stage Division & Video Division)	(France)	Beryl; Hazariel
2022 EX	(Indonesia)	Rian CYD; Yumaki	(Chile)	Eriza; Javier Gaete	(Spain)	Yuko; Exion	(Chile)	Eriza; Javier Gaete (Don't have Brother award at the event, but have similar awards.)
2023	(United Kingdom)	Clood; Tsupo	(Latvia)	SayoChuu; Saber	(Mexico)	Chris; Lorraine	(United Kingdom)	Clood; Tsupo
2023 Cosplay Cup	(Latvia)	SayoChuu; Saber	(Mexico)	Banana Ed; Banana Luis	(China)	Jiu Xin; You Ling	(Portugal)	Nymesia; Synergie (Don't have Brother award at the event, but have similar awards.)
2024 WCCS	(Poland)	Kairi; Dorian Makbeth	(Philippines)	Karlonne; Devas	(United Kingdom)	Newtsip; AliceNyanNya		
2024	(Japan)	Mamemayo; Mioshi	(Sweden)	Pilerud's cosplay (Henrik Pilerud); MightyMillis (Victoria Christensen)	(Germany)	Tedy; Avena	(Bulgaria)	Penumbra; ZIN
2025	(United States)	Heidi; Mckayla	(France)	Milou; Thaly	(Brazil)	Kellthy; Luis Telles	(United States)	Heidi; Mckayla
2026	(Hong Kong)	AR★Lu; Ronnie Kui	(Canada)	Autumn's Cosplay; CNR-Cosplay	(Brazil)	Avner; Gih	(Canada)	Autumn's Cosplay; CNR-Cosplay

- ^1 Group Champion: France (Pauline Mesa, Laurence Guermond, Wendy Roeltgen)
- ^2 Individual Champion: (Italy) Giorgia Vecchini
- ^3 3rd: Italy (Alessandro Leuti, Alessia de Magistris)

=== Results of the most recent Championship ===
Results of the 2026 World Cosplay Championship

2026 Award	Winner	
1st Place (Grand Champion)	(Hong Kong)	AR★Lu; Ronnie Kui
2nd Place (Runner-up 1st)	(Canada)	Autumn's Cosplay; CNR-Cosplay
3rd Place (Runner-up 2nd)	(Brazil)	Avner; Gih
Zipair Award (Next Journey Category/A Team To Make Its Mark On The Global Stage)	(India)	Timelord; StrangePlays110
Epilogue Media Award (Best Sound Category)	(Trinidad and Tobago)	Panterona; Maricia
Holiday Matsuri Award (Holiday Matsuri Category/Team Expressing Holiday Matsuri Feeling)	(South Africa)	Jessie Jestar; Speed_dy
Famoré Cutlery Award (Celebrating the Joy of Cosplay Category/Most Emotional Performance)	(Australia)	Creations by Cameron k8bit
Assist Wig Award (Wig Category)	(Brazil)	Avner; Gih
Nijigen no Mori Award (Best Armor Category/Best Costume Design)	(Indonesia)	Panda Pand; Ariochaz
Brother Award (Costume Making Category)	(Canada)	Autumn's Cosplay; CNR-Cosplay
Universal Entertainment Award (Dramatic Category/Most Movie Scenario)	(Latvia)	Takamy; Naname
Shiraf Award (Action Category/Most Excellent Action)	(Kuwait)	Dante; Niburhi
Tamakoshi Award (Alumni Category/Number 1 Team Select By Alumni)	(Hong Kong)	AR★Lu; Ronnie Kui

Results of the 2024 World Cinematic Cosplay Summit

2024 World Cinematic Cosplay Summit Awardrd	Winner	
1st Place (Grand Champion)	(Poland)	Kairi; Dorian Makbeth
2nd Place (Runner-up 1st)	(Philippines)	Karlonne; Devas
3rd Place (Runner-up 2nd)	(United Kingdom)	Newtsip; AliceNyanNya

Results of the Gamers8 Cosplay Cup supported by World Cosplay Summit

Gamers8 Cosplay Cup supported by World Cosplay Summit Award	Winner	
1st Place (Grand Champion)	(Latvia)	SayoChuu; Saber
2nd Place (Runner-up 1st)	(Mexico)	Banana Ed; Banana Luis
3rd Place (Runner-up 2nd)	(China)	Jiu Xin; You Ling
4th Place (Runner-up 3rd)	(Indonesia)	Unu; Ochi
5th Place (Runner-up 4th)	(Japan)	Daiki; Kuniton
Best Performance	(Hong Kong)	AR★Lu; Ronnie Kui
Best Crafted Costume	(Portugal)	Nymesia; Synergie

=== Performance by country ===
This list contains the champions of World Cosplay Summit.

Club	Wins	Winning years
Italy	3	2005, 2010, 2013
Brazil	3	2006, 2008, 2011
Indonesia	2	2016, 2022 Exhibition Event
Japan	3	2009, 2012, 2024
Mexico	2	2015, 2018
France	2	2007, 2022 (Stage Division)
Russia	1	2014
China	1	2017
Australia	1	2019
Germany	1	2021
Sweden	1	2022 (Video Division)
United Kingdom	1	2023
Latvia	1	2023 Cosplay Cup
Poland	1	2024 WCCS
USA	1	2025
Hong Kong	1	2026

== Preliminary conventions, organizations and events ==
The following conventions, organizations and events have held or organized the preliminary contests to select the representatives of each country for the Cosplay Championship since 2005

- Australia: SMASH! in Sydney
- Austria: AniNite in Vienna
- Bangladesh: Bangladesh Association of Cosplayers – BAC in Dhaka
- Belgium: Made In Asia in Brussels
- Bulgaria: Aniventure ComicCon in Sofia
- Brazil: Editora JBC / Festival do Japão in São Paulo
- Canada: Otakuthon in Montreal
- China: Howell International Trade Fair Ltd. in Beijing
- Chile: AEX Santiago in Santiago
- Colombia: CLICK ON DESIGN LTDA in Bogotá
- Costa Rica: Con-X Convention in San José, Costa Rica
- Czech Republic: Animefest in Brno
- Denmark: J-Popcon in Copenhagen
- Egypt: EGYcon in Cairo
- Finland: Cosplay Finland Tour / Tracon in Tampere
- France: Japan Expo Sud in Marseille
- Germany: Connichi in Kassel
- Hong Kong: C3 in Hong Kong
- India: Winter Cosplay Wonderland 2 in Chümoukedima, Nagaland
- Indonesia: Indonesia Cosplay Grand Prix in Jakarta
- Italy: ROMICS in Rome
- Japan: Cossan in Tokyo
- Kuwait: Plamo Con (2014) / Comic Con Kuwait (2017) in Kuwait City
- Latvia: UniCon – Latvian Comic Con in Riga
- Malaysia: World Cosplay Summit Malaysia in Kuala Lumpur
- Mexico: Expo-TNT in Mexico City
- Myanmar: WCS Myanmar Preliminary in Mandalay
- Netherlands: Animecon in The Hague
- Philippines: Anime Alliance Philippines in Manila
- Poland: Magnificon Winter in Kraków
- Portugal: Iberanime (2014) in Lisbon
- Puerto Rico: Puerto Rico Comic Con (2017) in San Juan
- Russia: Hinode in Moscow
- South Africa: IconCGC in Gauteng
- South Korea: Samsung Everland / Wonder Cosplay Festival in Seoul
- Spain: FICOMIC / Salón del Manga (Ficomic / Salón del Manga de Barcelona) in Barcelona
- Sweden: Comic Con Stockholm in Stockholm
- Switzerland: Polymanga in Montreux
- Taiwan: Petit Fancy in Taipei
- Thailand: COSCOM / Orinos BKK / Asia Comic Con / Cosplay Grand Prix / Japan Expo / WCS Thailand Preliminary By GYu Creative (2019–present) in Bangkok
- Trinidad and Tobago: Alias Entertainment Expo in Tunapuna
- UK: MCM Comic Con in London
- USA: Holiday Matsuri in Orlando
- Vietnam: Touch FES in Ho Chi Minh City

2==Former preliminary conventions, organizations and events==

- Australia: Animania in Sydney (2009–2013)
- Bulgaria: AnimeS Expo in Sofia (2018-2024)
- China: Hangzhou True Design Company Ltd. (2005–2007)
- France: Epitanime (2005)
- India: Japan Pavilion in India Gaming Show (2017) in Delhi
- india: Japan Pavilion in India Gaming Show South (2018) in Bengaluru
- Japan: Cosplay Festa in Tokyo Dome City (Tokyo, 2006–2008)
- Japan: Layered XTRM at Osaka Castle Bandshell (Osaka, 2007)
- Japan: Cosplayers JAM Revolution (Osaka, 2008)
- Japan: Nipponbashi Street Festa in Osaka
- Singapore: Cosfest in Singapore (2006–2017)
- Singapore: Anime Festival Asia in Singapore (2018-2019)
- Thailand: Negibose Thailand (2006–2016) / Oishi Group (2010–2015 Co-organizations With Negibose Thailand) in Bangkok
- USA: New York Anime Festival (2008, 2009) in New York City
- USA: FanimeCon (2010) in San Jose
- USA: AM2 (2011) in Anaheim
- USA: Katsucon (2012) in Washington, D.C.
- USA: Anime Central in Chicago
- israel: Harucon (2019-2020) in Jerusalem

== Other international cosplay competitions ==
In addition to the World Cosplay Summit, there are other international cosplay competitions:

- China International Cartoon & Animation Festival (CICAF) / China Cosplay Super Show (CCSS) in Hangzhou, China
- Clara Cow's Cosplay Cup (C4) in Rotterdam, Netherlands (Final Year held in 2022)
- Cosplay World Masters (CWM) in Lisbon, Portugal
- Euro Cosplay Championship (EuroCos) in London, United Kingdom (Now merged with Cosplay Central Crown Championship)
- Extreme Cosplay Gathering (formerly European Cosplay Gathering) (ECG) in Paris, France
- Gyeonggi International Cosplay Festival (GICOF) in South Korea
- International Cosplay League (ICL) in Madrid, Spain
- Nordic Cosplay Championship (NCC) in Sweden
- Yamato Cosplay Cup International (YCCI) in São Paulo, Brazil

== See also ==
- Anime convention
- List of anime conventions
