= AM² =

Anime convention in Anaheim, California

- The official AM² logo.
- Status: Defunct
- Genre: Animation, Manga, Music
- Venue: Anaheim Convention Center
- Locations: Anaheim, California
- Country: United States
- Inaugurated: 2011
- Most recent: 2012

AM² (Which is pronounced: "A" "M" "Squared") was a three-day anime convention held annually in the summer at the Anaheim Convention Center in Anaheim, California.

== Programming ==
The content provided by AM² covers a range typical to anime conventions along with a few less traditional additions. Examples of this content include concerts, Masquerade (costume/talent show), various smaller cosplay events, an AMV contest, an exhibits area/dealer room, an "Artist Alley", GoH and fan panels, workshops, video screenings, tabletop gaming, console gaming, a karaoke, an arcade, and late night dance. Some examples of less common events include a Summer Festival, maid café, and the hosting of a preliminary round of the World Cosplay Summit.

== History ==
In April 2010, Japanese Pop idol Erina Mano was announced as a guest at Anime Expo for the world release of her acting debut Kaidan Shin Mimibukuro Kaiki. When AX cancelled this appearance, an alternative event was created at the nearby Club Nokia. The premiere was organized by a former PR and marketing contractor who had been terminated from Anime Expo. Additionally, several other people joined the organization who had also left Anime Expo for various reasons.

In addition to Mano-chan's appearance, several other attractions were added. The expanded 1-day event was named Club 2 the Max in reference to the choice of venue. Some of the added attractions included a Maid Cafe, a charity concert & music video shoot by X Japan, and autograph session with Power Rangers stars. Club 2 the Max (aka MAX) was deemed largely successful by its sponsors, who decided to further fund it as an annual convention. MAX announced a name change in November 2010, choosing to be called AM².

The first AM² was held on July 1–3, 2011, the same weekend as Anime Expo 2011 in one of Anime Expo's former locations, the Anaheim Convention Center. This occurred after a hacker modified the convention website stating that convention was cancelled. The convention returned to the venue in 2012 on June 15–17.

It was initially announced that the convention for 2013 was indefinitely postponed to an unknown later date. No additional announcements were ever made and the official website was eventually abandoned.

== Event History ==
Dates	Location	Atten.	Guests
July 1–3, 2011	Anaheim Convention Center; Anaheim, California	8000	JB Blanc, Gashicon, heidi., An Kanon, Kanon Wakeshima, kanonxkanon, Neil Kaplan, Sunao Katabuchi, Reuben Langdon, Masao Maruyama, Kazha, Sadie, SCANDAL, Miho Shimogasa, Sixh., Steve Staley, Shinobu Ichiyanagi Akihito Yamashita
June 15–17, 2012	Anaheim Convention Center; Anaheim, California	14,000	Quinton Flynn, Toshihiro Kawamoto, Andrea Libman, Kazha, Hiroshi Nagahama, Putumayo, Sixh., Shinobu Ichiyanagi, Tara Strong.

== Notes ==
- In response to the 2011 Tōhoku earthquake and tsunami, AM² sponsored a charity art auction at Meltdown Comics in West Hollywood, California. The event raised just under $7,500 on behalf of the Japan NGO Earthquake Relief and Recovery Fund.
- AM² Passports included additional benefits including discounts.
