= Shinobu Ichiyanagi =

Japanese artist

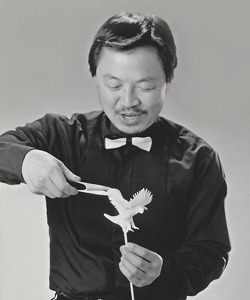
- Shinobu Ichiyanagi with his candy art work
- Born: May 26, 1952 (age 74); Sapporo Hokkaido, Japan
- Occupations: Amezaiku Shokunin, Gemologist, Jewelry Designer,
- Years active: 1971–Present

Shinobu “Shan” Ichiyanagi (一柳 忍, Ichiyangi Shinobu; born May 26, 1952) also known as "CANDYMAN" is a master Amezaiku or candy sculpture artist. As a party and event entertainer, he specializes in sculpting hot taffy-like candy into fantastic animals and objects using a palette of gemstone inspired candy colors. This traditional ancient Japanese folk art that originated in China has been practiced for over 1000 years in Japan.

Through a thirty-year career, Ichiyanagi has become known internationally as a live performance artist.

His fans call him as a ”Shan The Candyman", "Shan The Candy Sculptor","Shan The Candy Artist" and more.

In addition to his Amezaiku career, Ichiyanagi is a Graduate Gemologist G.G. - jewelry designer and a karate Instructor, holding Black Belts in three styles, Shorinji Kempo - Shotekan Karate - Shinkendo.

== Early life ==
Ichiyanagai was born in the city of Sapporo, Hokkaido Prefecture, Hokkaido Island; the second of three sons and one sister of Miyako and Osamu Ichiyanagi. He moved to Los Angeles in the U.S. a month after graduating in 1971 from Sapporo Kosei High School at the age of 18. to live with his one relative, Kazuko and John Smith (sponsors), in. This was the beginning of Ichiyangi’s own personal cultural exchange with America.

== Careers ==
By the age of 16, in Japan, Ichiyanagi earned a black belt in Shorinji Kempo.

While attending college, Ichiyanagi teamed up with Benny Urquidez to travel together for 2 years in the Los Angeles area, demonstrating martial arts skills to young college students and eventually to private lessons. As a head instructor under Hiroyasu Fujishima, he taught Karate at Los Angeles Valley College, California State University Northridge (CSUN) Karate Club and the California Karate Association (defunct), directly affiliated with Japan Karate Association (JKA). During his first years in America, Ichiyanagi continued his formal educational studies at night for English language while attending Los Angeles Valley College (LAVC) and as a business major attending California State University Northridge.

During class time at adult school, Ichiyanagi met the acquaintance and friendship of Amezaiku Master Masagi Terasawa, a fellow Japanese expatriate Master Terasawa accepted Ichiyanagi as a personal student, and Ichiyanagi had a 3-year apprenticeship between 1973 and 1976.

From 1976 to the present date, Ichiyanagi has performed Amezaiku for thousands of events and private parties in the United States and Internationally. A modern prologue including the AM² convention in 2011, as well as with private events.

== Jewelry design ==
Ichiyangi transitioned his work ethic into the field of Gemology, in 1980 with his graduation from GIA. For three decades he has paralleled his Amezaiku work with professional work in the jewelry industry.

== Professional History ==
Karate - Black Belt

- 1968, Shorinjikempo, Sapporo, Japan
- 1972, Shotokan Karate, Los Angeles, California
- 1973, Instructor Japanese Karate Association, Los Angeles, California
- 1991, Shinkendo, Los Angeles, California

Amezaiku Shokunin

- 1973, Student of Master Masagi Terasawa
- 1976, First Professional Amezaiku private & public event performances
- 1976 to date, Professional performances, corporate events, public exhibitions, charitable events, private parties.

Gemologist - Jewelry Design

- 1980, Graduate Gemologist, Gemological Institute of America
- 1982 Jewelry Business & Services - Jewelry Design
- 2010 CAD Design
- 2012 Jewelry website, www.sugilite.jp
