= Yuriko Tiger =

Italian model

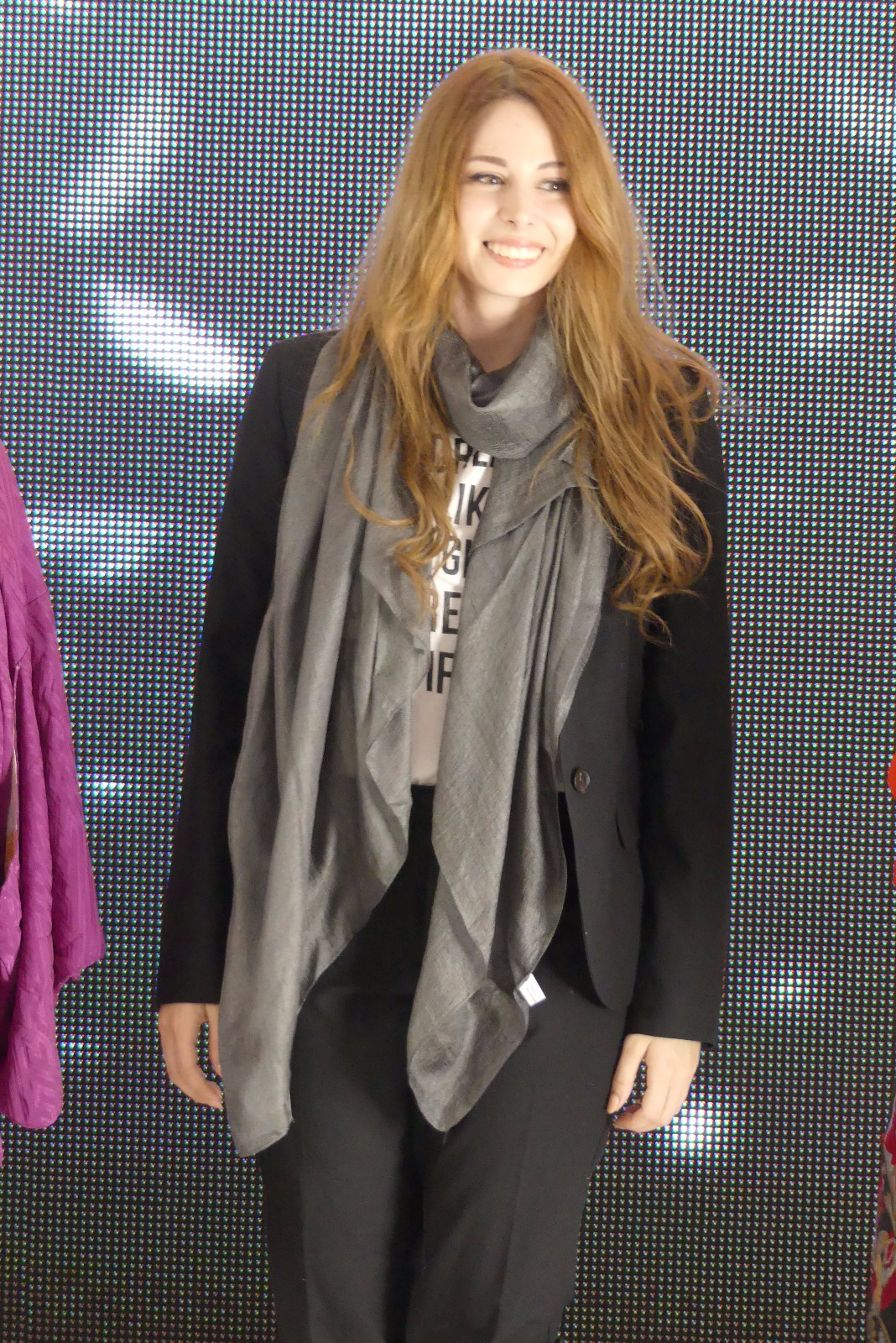
- Yuriko Tiger in 2017
- Born: Eleonora Aureliana Guglielmi; 5 July 1993 (age 33); Imperia, Italy
- Occupations: Cosplayer, model, actress, idol
- Years active: 2013 – present
- Website: http://yurikotiger.jp

Eleonora Aureliana Guglielmi (born 5 July 1993), better known as Yuriko Tiger (Japanese: ユリコタイガー Romaji: Yuriko taigā), is an Italian cosplayer, promotional model, YouTuber, voice actress, Twitch streamer, actress, and idol.

She has been cosplaying and modeling since 2008, having served as the official cosplayer for Bandai Namco (Tekken 7 series), as an actress in the Dorama Kin no Tono (金の殿) and having formed her own J-Pop group called Samurai Tiger - Samurai Apartment Love's Yuriko Tiger (in collaboration with "Samurai Apartment").

== Early life ==
Yuriko was born in Savona, Italy, and grew up in Imperia. Her father runs a bakery in Imperia and her mother is a former model.

As a child, she often watched anime, that inspired her interest in cosplaying. Yuriko attended different schools, that she was forced to drop due to cyber bullying and bullying. Attending the "Accademia delle Arti", Imperia, she started working in her father's bakery in order to save money and move to Japan. She has been one of the first students of "Manga Summer School", from 2007 to 2009, and she also studied as a make-up artist.

"Everything is possible, but believing is not enough. Planning and giving all you have is the secret. Most of all, never give up!"

== Career ==
Yuriko has been cosplaying since 2008; the first character was Suzumiya Haruhi, from the eponymous light novels series. After a three months experience in Japan, she moved to Tokyo in 2013. Her first experience as a model was on the magazine Playboy Japan, her first and last work as a Gravure Model. Her first television experience was on Why Did You Come to Japan? in which reporters interview people just arrived in Japan at Narita Airport. After a brief interview they decided to follow her around, eventually producing a 25-minute segment that showed her apartment, a trip to a maid cafe, and her work at the World Cosplay Summit. On that day, "Yuriko Tiger" was the most searched word on Yahoo! Japan.

Afterwards, she worked as a model for Toyota (2014), Lawson and Sugoi Japan (2015) and she appeared in numerous TV programs as a guest of honor, such as Baking, Nobunaga, Nyantere, Akazukichan and as a semi-regular guest and cosplayer on Tokoro-san Nippon No Deban (2015).

Her career as an Idol was short, from 2014 to 2015, during which she released her hit single Yuri Yuri Kakumei, which can be found in each DAM Karaoke and iTunes Store Japan. At first her dream was to become an Idol but then her agency decided to promote her as a Talent instead, due to her strong personality. Because of that, Yuriko has undergone a change of style at the beginning of 2016.

Later in 2016 Yuriko took a break from her job in Tokyo and spent 4 months in Italy, working in numerous convention as a guest and host.

From summer 2016 she went back to Tokyo, working as one of the official cosplayer of Harley Quinn for the promotion of Suicide Squad on the red carpet, starting her own Radio Program called Cool Japan, hosting numerous events for the promotion of Tekken 7 all around Japan, modeling for the publicity of the famous theme park J-World (Bandai Namco) and hosting lives on her Nico Nico Douga Channel sponsored by Kadogawa Games.

In 2017, she took part in the promotion of Justice League as Wonder Woman on the red carpet and resumed singing by releasing the single "Haruka" in collaboration with Samurai Apartment as "Samurai Tiger (Samurai Apartment Love's Yuriko Tiger)". She also worked as a model for Swallowtail, a company of wigs and colored contact lenses, and was also the first cosplayer to act in a drama (TV show) called "Prison Hotel" that aired on BS Japan.

In 2018, she moved from private agency Dream Networks to Twin Planet. She opened a second Twitter account and an Instagram account both called @psykhere in which she shows her punk side that for several years she had to keep hidden for work needs. She has thus started working as an alternative model for clothing brands, and also carries on her passion for music, expressing on more than one occasion the desire to create a rock band of her own. As for the cosplay, she became the official cosplayer of FLCL for the launch of the second season of the anime. On that occasion she played the protagonist Haruko.

In 2019 Yuriko Tiger was chosen as the cover girl of the first issue of "Layers Life", a new magazine dedicated to cosplayers, and opened a second YouTube channel in Japanese language where she talks about her life, cosplay and the differences between Italy and Japan.

In 2020, due to the COVID-19, almost all events in which she was expected to participate were cancelled. Despite the difficulties, Yuriko was able to fulfill one of her dreams by playing Motoko Kusanagi for the promotion of the new series Ghost in The Shell SAC_2045 (available on Netflix) and acted as a Tinder model for the new Tinder Japan advertising campaign along with the famous model Kiko Mizuhara. Also, after 7 years, she was contacted again by the television program "Why Did You Come to Japan?" to show how her life has changed.

== Private life ==
For a long time Yuriko had contracts that prevented her from having public relations, after the change of agency she had the opportunity to share with her fans her long-distance relationship, lasting about a year, with a Japanese-Canadian photographer. In 2020, she came out as bisexual through various stories on Instagram, supported by her agency. To answer the question "How did you know?" made by a fan, she published an excerpt of the anime Ranma ½ saying "Looking at Ranma there were those who liked female Ranma and those who liked male Ranma. I liked them both."

Yuriko Tiger loves animals but for a long time she could not have pets due to strict Japanese laws. In 2020, she finally adopted a Scottish Fold named Amore.

In her spare time, Yuriko likes to draw, play video games (although she calls herself "a sucker"), and watch her favorite anime "Nana" by Ai Yazawa.

=== TV appearances ===
- Tokoro-san no Nippon no deban (所さんのニッポンの出番) (TBS)
- You ha nani shi ni nihon he? (YOUは何しに日本へ?) (TV Tokyo)
- Tabi Zuki-chan (旅ずきんちゃん) (TBS)
- Nobunaga (ノブナガ) (CBC TV)
- Viking (バイキング Baikingu) (Fuji TV)
- Sekai ni urikome! Nagoya meshi basutsuā (CBC TV)
- Zoom In!! Saturday (ズームイン！！サタデー Zūmuin! ! Satadē') (NTV)
- Nakazawa keiko no uppyi sutēshon (中沢佳子のうっぴぃステーション) (SBC TV)
- Uppyi guranpuri (うっぴぃーグランプリ) (TV Shinshū)
- N suta (Nスタ Ensuta) (TBS)
- Sandējapon (サンデージャポン Sunday Japon) (TBS)
- Nyantere (ニャンテレ) (Sendai Television)
- Sekai no mura no Doerai san (世界の村のどエライさん) (Fuji TV) – 2018
- Amejipangu (アメージパング) (TBS) – 2018
- Kuruma Arundesu Kedo…? (車あるんですけど...?) (TV Tokyo) – 2018
- ESport – Official Cosplayer of Ivy from Soul Calibur IV – 2018
- Amejipangu (アメージパング) (TBS) – 2019
- Japan In Motion – Reporter (Hiroshima TV) – 2019
- Sono Hoka No Hito no Attemita (TBS) – 2019
- You ha nani shi ni nihon he? (TV Tokyo) – 2020

=== TV show ===
- Kin No Tono Special Guest Star (Role: Rosa) (金の殿～バック・トゥ・ザ・NAGOYA～) CBC TV (Nagoya）
- Prison Hotel Regular (Role: Rosa) – 2018 (BS Japan)

=== Web TV ===
- Denjin? Getcha (電人?ゲッチャ) (NicoNico Live)
- Wessu! (WEっす!) (AmebaStudio TV)
- Sho ko yuri burōdou~ei (しょこ・ゆりブロードウェイ) (AmebaStudio TV)
- HangameLive (NicoNico Live)/NHN PlayArt
- Tekken 7 (鉄拳7本格稼働直前スペシャル) (Namco Bandai Entertainment)
- Tekken 7 (鉄拳7本格稼働特別番組ニコ生配信) (Namco Bandai Entertainment)
- Nico Nico TV (ニコニコ生放送23.5時間テレビ)
- Nikoraji (ニコラジ) NicoNico Live
- YOSHIKI CHANNEL (ニコニコ生放送) (NicoNico Live) – 2018/2019
- Japan In Motion – YouTube Channel Reporter – 2019

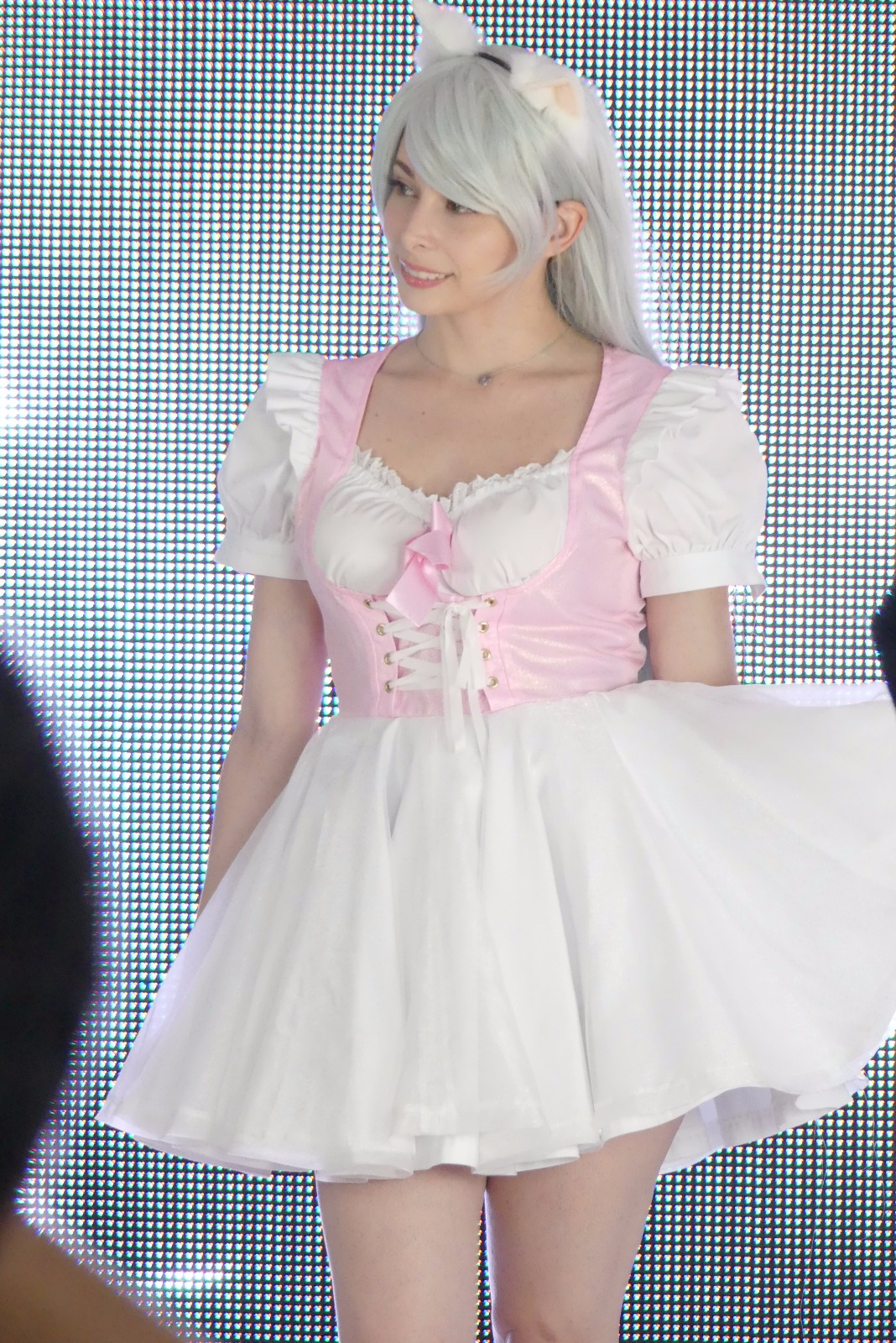
Yuriko Tiger on stage, original cosplay

=== CM ===
- Lawson (カスタードクリームシュー Kasutādokurīmushū)
- Yū gurūpu (長野トヨタ自動車）春バージョン Nagano Toyota Motor spring and autumn version)
- SUGOI JAPAN - Newspaper Yomiurishinbun (新聞広告（読売新聞）
- Saber - Poster FATE/STAY NIGHT セイバー ポスター(COSPATIO)
- Nagano Toyota (spring and autumn) (長野トヨタ自動車 新聞広告/春バージョン)
- Pinsa De Roma PR Girl / Model (PinsaDeRome PRガール/モデル)
- Tinder (TV spot and advertising boards) – 2020

=== Radio ===
- Dr. Kopa no kogane no tobira (Dr.コパの黄金の扉) (KBS Radio)
- Shimada shūhei no kaiun rajio (島田秀平の開運ラジ) (National Radio / 16 stations)
- Gotō mai no shinpai nai sa~a ~ (後藤麻衣の心配ないさぁ～) (Radio Nippon)
- Blsr Jewelry Bible (Radio Nippon)
- Nakazawa keiko no uppyi sutēshon (中沢佳子のうっぴぃステーション) (SBC Radio)
- Miss Radio (ミスラジ Misuraji) (Nippon Cultural Broadcasting)
- "Tatekawa Toshira" Yuriko Tiger Cool Japan (立川こしら・ユリコタイガーのクールジャパン対決!)
- Radio DeeJay – Interview – 2018
- PoliRadio – Interview – 2019
- Sunstar Weekend Journey – Special Guest (Yokohama, Japan) – 2020

=== Model ===
- Playboy (週刊プレイボーイ/グラビア) (Shūeisha)
- Danganronpa Special Fan Book (ダンガンロンパ スペシャル ファンブック) (Takarajimasha)
- Cosplay Channel special issue (コスプレチャンネル」創刊号表紙、特集) (shimusamumedia)
- Cosplay Channel special calendar (コスプレチャンネル」02号表紙、付録カレンダー、特集)
- Model Figure (フィギュアモデル) (Digimo)
- Model for portraits (Imai Takashi Hiroshi), (絵画モデル(今井喬裕)展覧会出展、数作品/日本) art gallery in Japan
- Los Angeles Fine Art Show (The Los Angeles Fine Art Show」出展4作品絵画モデル) (LA)
- Character models (キャラクターモデル) (COSPATIO)
- J-World cosplay model (Shonen Jump)
- Giappop – 2019
- Beyond The Moon – Kaguya Luna Fashion Brand (輝夜月の公式アパレルブランド「Beyond The Moon」) – 2019
- HellCatPunks – 2020

=== Events ===
==== 2014 ====
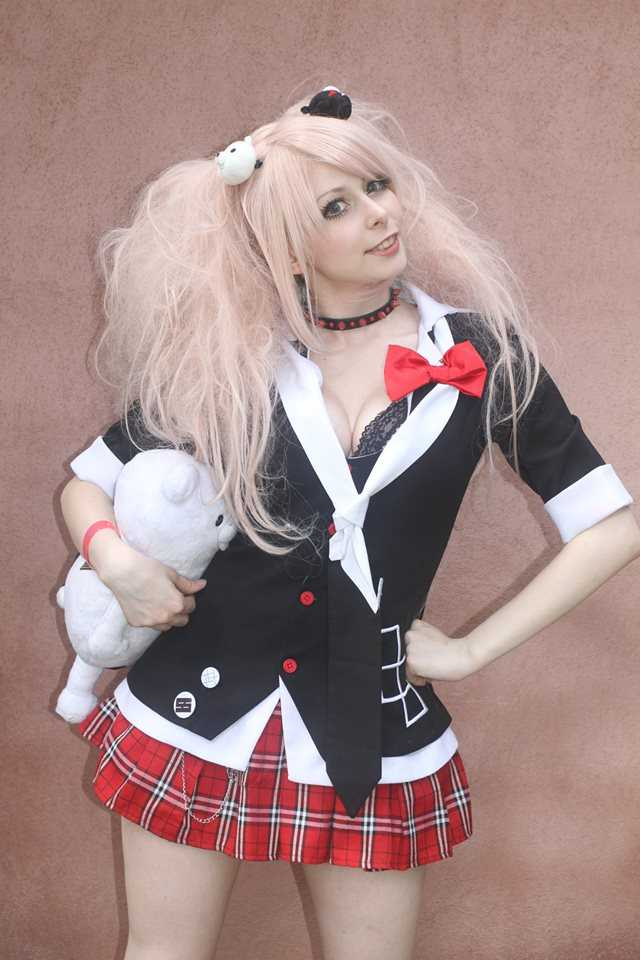
Yuriko Tiger (2014)

- Playboy weekly (Shūeisha) (週刊プレイボーイ」握手会（集英社)
- Tekken 3 Tournament / Guest (鉄拳3遊技機関連イベント/ゲスト出演)
- Etna Comics / Italy
- Anisondisco (アニソンディスコ) (DJ)
- "Yū gurūpu 90^{e} anniversaire festival" (ユー・グループ90周年フェスティバル) (Nagano Toyota Motor Corporation)
- 20e anniversaire of Tekken (MC) (鉄拳20周年ファン感謝祭) (Bandai Namco Entertainment)
- "Elsword" online game (PR) (エルソード」オンラインゲーム) (NHN Playart)
- Others

==== 2015 ====
- Romics / Italy
- Anime Japan SUGOI JAPAN / (Journal Yomiuri)(読売新聞)
- "Killing Bites" Volume 3 release event
- Etna Comics Live Stage / Italy
- Wondercon Bari Live Stage / Italy
- "THE KING OF IRON FIST TOURNAMENT 2015 TOKYO CHALLENGE" Tekken 7「鉄拳7公式賞金制大会」
- PiNSA DE ROMA opening ceremony (日本初上陸オープニングイベント)
- Nico Nico Super Party 2015 (ニコニコ超パーティー2015) (Saitama Super Arena)
- Lucca Comics and Games 2015 / Italy
- SUGOI JAPAN 2016 and HMW collaboration PR / Shibuya / MODI (SUGOI JAPAN 2016」&「HMV」コラボPR/)(渋谷MODI)
- "THE KING OF IRON FIST TOURNAMENT 2015 JAPAN ROUND" Tekken 7 Tournament「鉄拳7公式賞金制大会」
- Anisondisco Shibuya WOMB (アニソンディスコ渋谷WOMB)
- Others

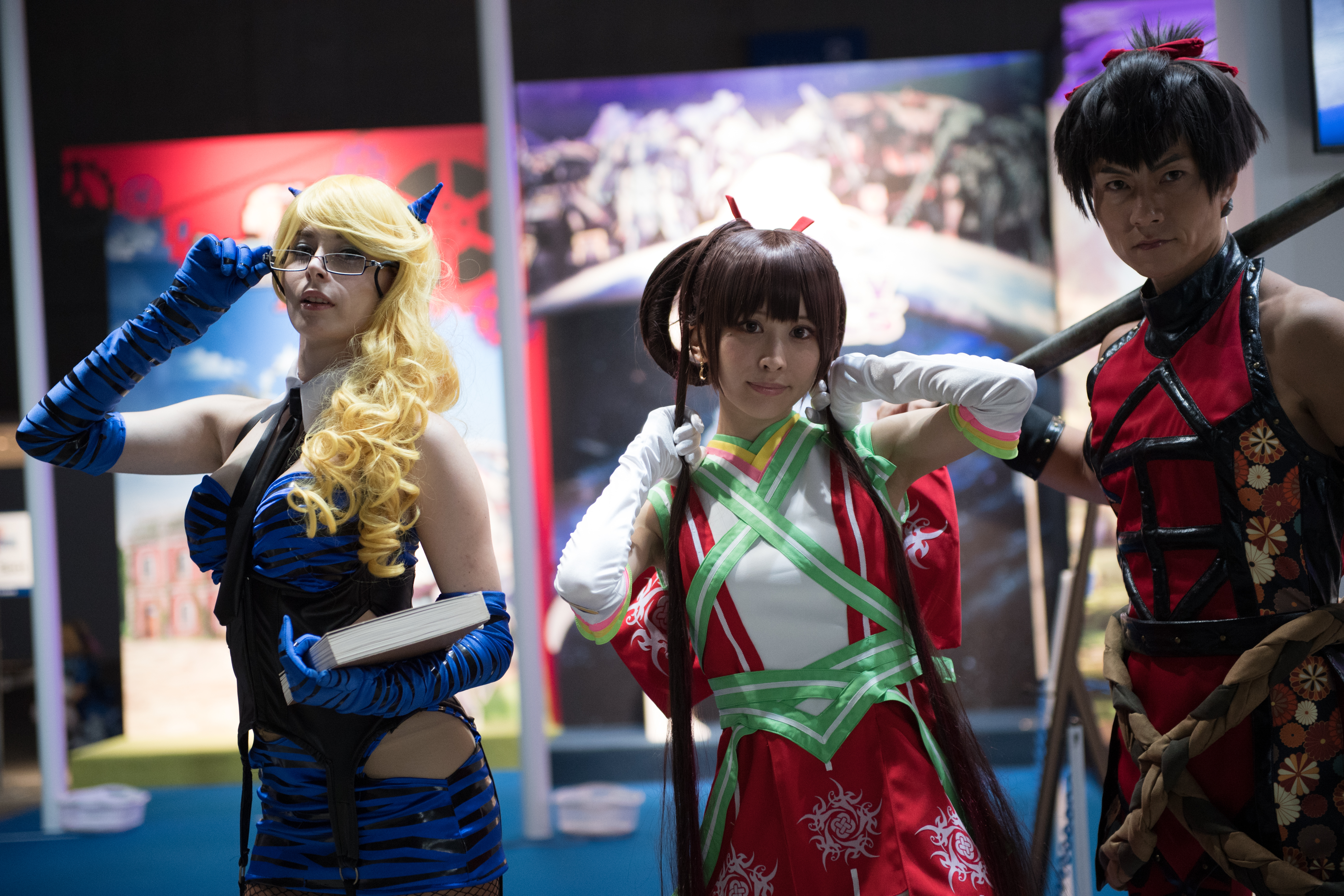
Yuriko Tiger portraying Aome (God Wars) for Kadogawa Games

==== 2016 ====
- "Suicide Squad Japan Premier" portraying Harley Quinn (one of the official cosplayer), DC Comics (スーサイド・スクワッド ジャパンプレミア、東京国際フォーラムホールA）
- "Tokyo Game Show" On stage portraying Aome from God Wars - Over Time (Kadogawa Games) (東京ゲームショウ2016)
- Others

==== 2017 ====
- "JAEPO" (JAEPO×闘会議2017)
- "Nico Nico Choukaigi", Marble, portraying Elf from Lineage II: Revolution (ニコニコ超会議2017)
- "Universal Carnival x Sammy Festival" model cosplayer portraying Persefone (GOD Room)
- "Sendai Anime Fes" in Sendai, Live Exhibition as Samurai Tiger
- "Tanabata Tohoku" in Sendai, Live Exhibition as Samurai Tiger
- "Otafuse" in Malaysia, special guest (portraying Lili Rochefort from Tekken 7 and A2 from NieR:Automata)
- Others

==== 2018 ====
- Comicon – Special Cosplay Guest (Naples, Italy)
- Cosplay Event – Special Guest (Fukushima)
- Otakuthon – Cosplay Guest of Honour (Montreal (Canada)
- FLCL Series Premiere – Official Cosplayer of Haruko Haruhara for FLCL (Tokyo)
- Lucca – Special Cosplay Guest (Lucca, Italy)
- Nakano Game – Official Cosplayer of Ivy from Soul Calibur IV for Red Bull (Tokyo)
- ESport – Official Cosplayer of Ivy from Soul Calibur IV (Tokyo)
- Soul Calibur IV Launch Event – Official Cosplayer of Ivy from Soul Calibur IV (Tokyo)
- Soul Calibur IV Launch Event – Official Cosplayer of Ivy from Soul Calibur IV (Osaka)
- CygamesFes – Official Cosplayer of Nina-chan for DragaliaLost (Tokyo)
- Tokyo Comicon – DC COSPLAYERS LEAGUE 2018 – Official Cosplayer of Wonder Woman for DC Comics (Tokyo)

==== 2019 ====
- Naviglio Comics – Special Cosplay Guest (Milan, Italy)
- Nerd Show – Special Cosplay Guest (Bologna, Italy)
- IberAnime – Special Cosplay Guest (Lisbon, Portugal)
- Milano Comics And Games – Special Cosplay Guest (Milan, Italy)
- FantaExpo – Special Cosplay Guest (Salerno, Italy)
- ALEcomics – Special Cosplay Guest (Alessandria, Italy)
- Fujicos – Special Cosplay Guest (Japan)

==== 2020 ====
- World Cosplay Summit – Special Guest (Nagoya, Japan)
- DC Fandome – Guest Online
- FantaExpo Salerno – Guest Online
- Promotion of GHOST IN THE SHELL SAC_2045

=== Discography ===
- "Yuri Yuri Kakumei" Single (ユリユリ☆革命リリース)
- "Haruka" Single, as Samurai Tiger (Samurai Apartment Love's Yuriko Tiger)

=== Voice actress ===
- Dubber for Kurumana go korekushon (App), character: Giulietta (車なごコレクション」/ジュリエッタ役) (2014)
