= Aichi Arts Center =

Building in Nagoya, Japan

Coordinates: 35°10′15″N 136°54′41″E

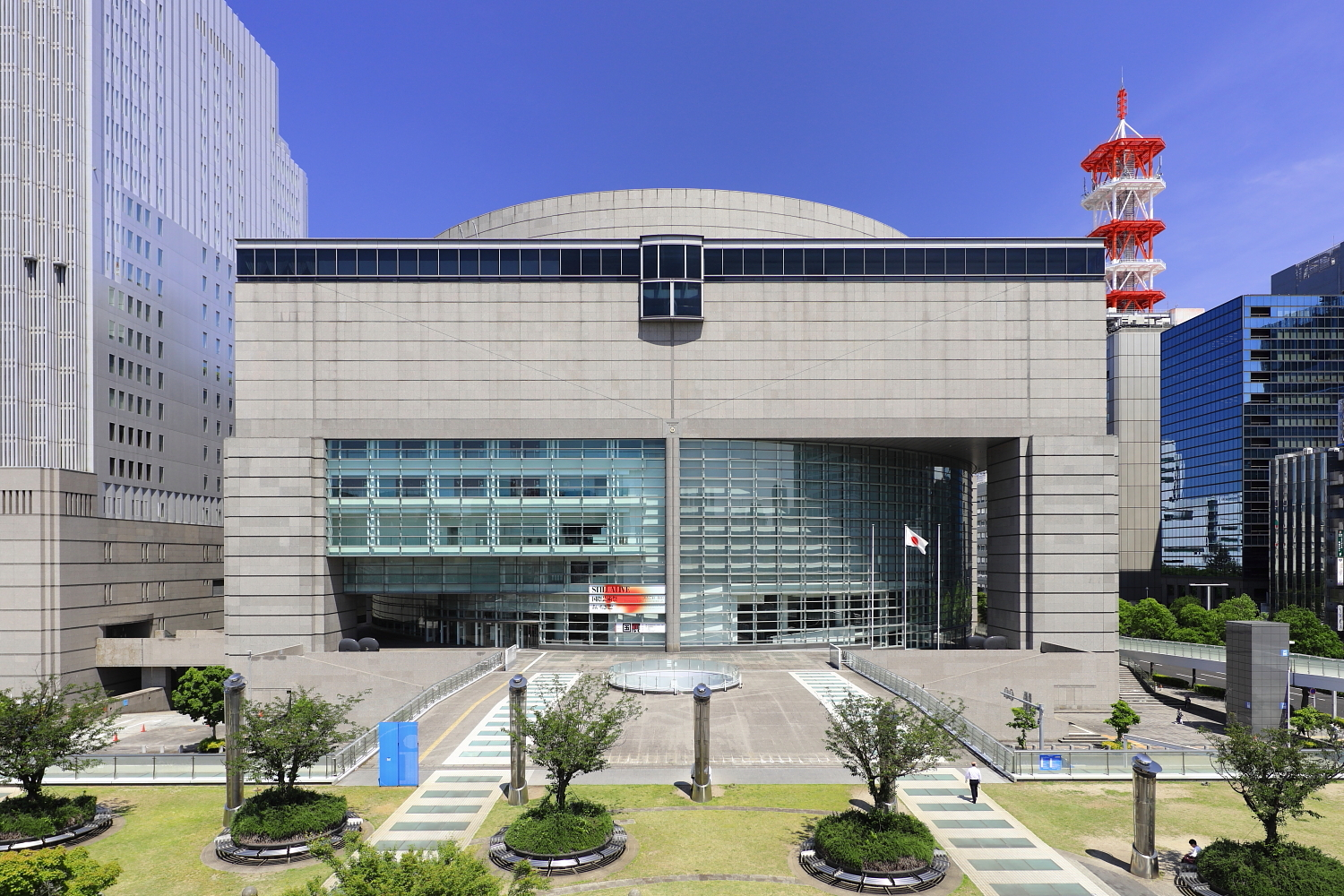
Aichi Arts Center

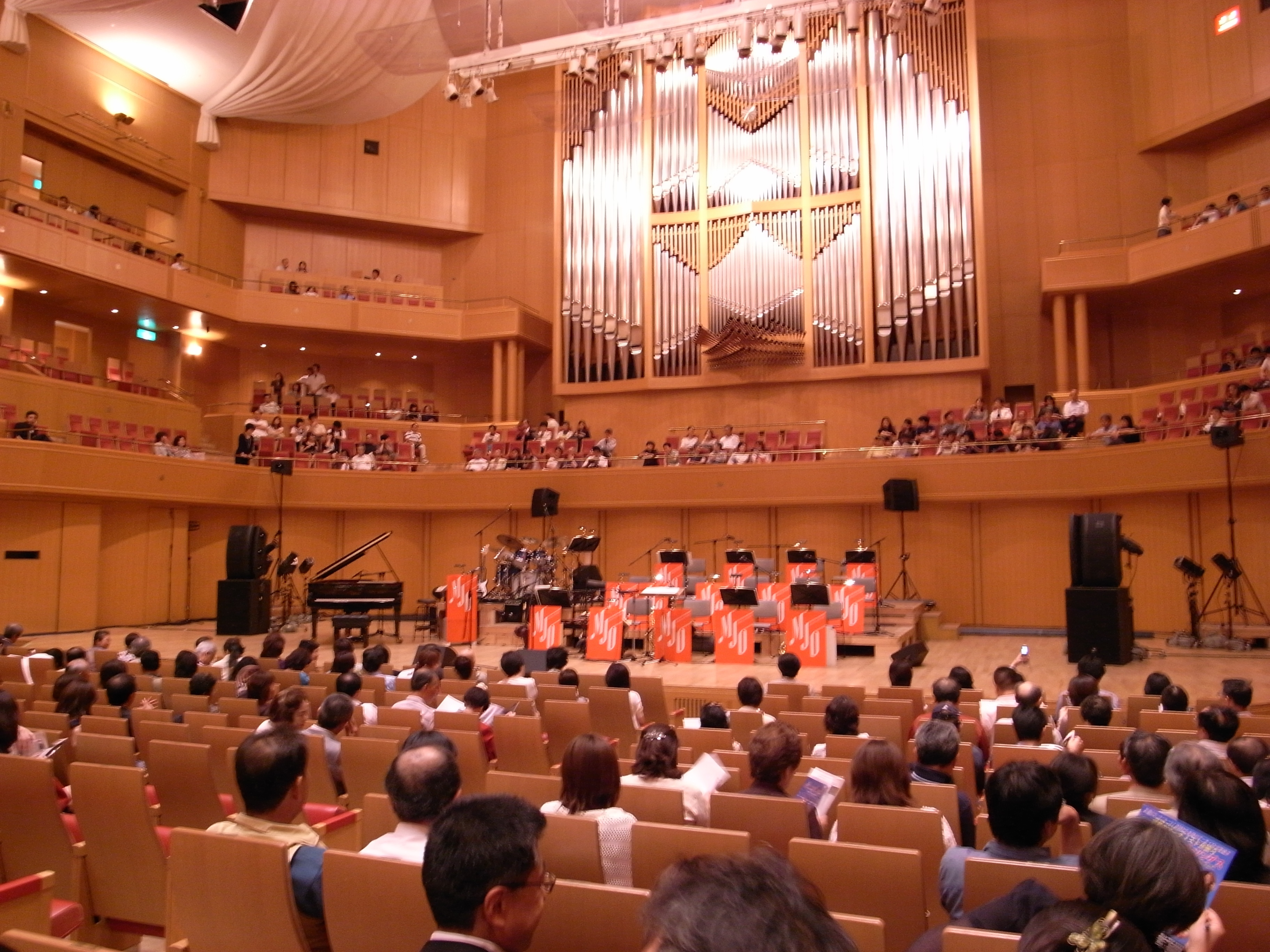
Aichi Prefectural Arts Theater's concert hall

The Aichi Arts Center (愛知芸術文化センター, Aichi Geijutsu Bunka Senta) is the main venue for the performing arts in Nagoya, Aichi Prefecture, Japan.

The center consists of:

- Aichi Prefectural Museum
- Aichi Prefectural Arts Theater
  - Main Hall - 2,480 seats
  - Concert Hall - 1,800 seats
  - Small Hall - 330 seats
- Aichi Prefectural Arts Promotion Service
- Aichi Prefectural Library

Oasis 21 is located right in front of the building.

The Aichi Art Center also hosts the fine arts exhibition Nitten.

== See also ==
- Nagoya Philharmonic Orchestra
