= Oasis 21 =

Coordinates: 35°10′15″N 136°54′34″E

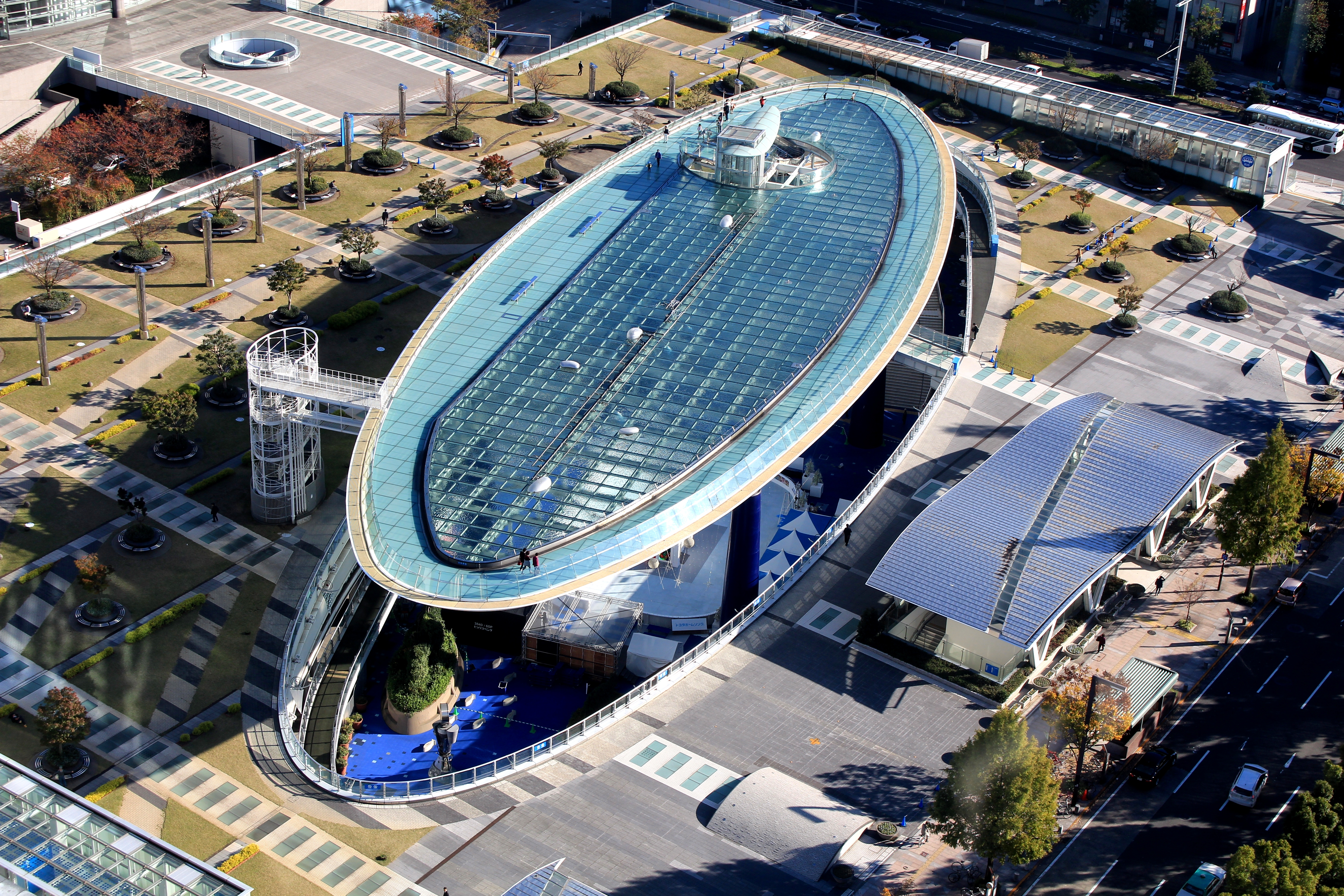
Glass roof of Oasis 21

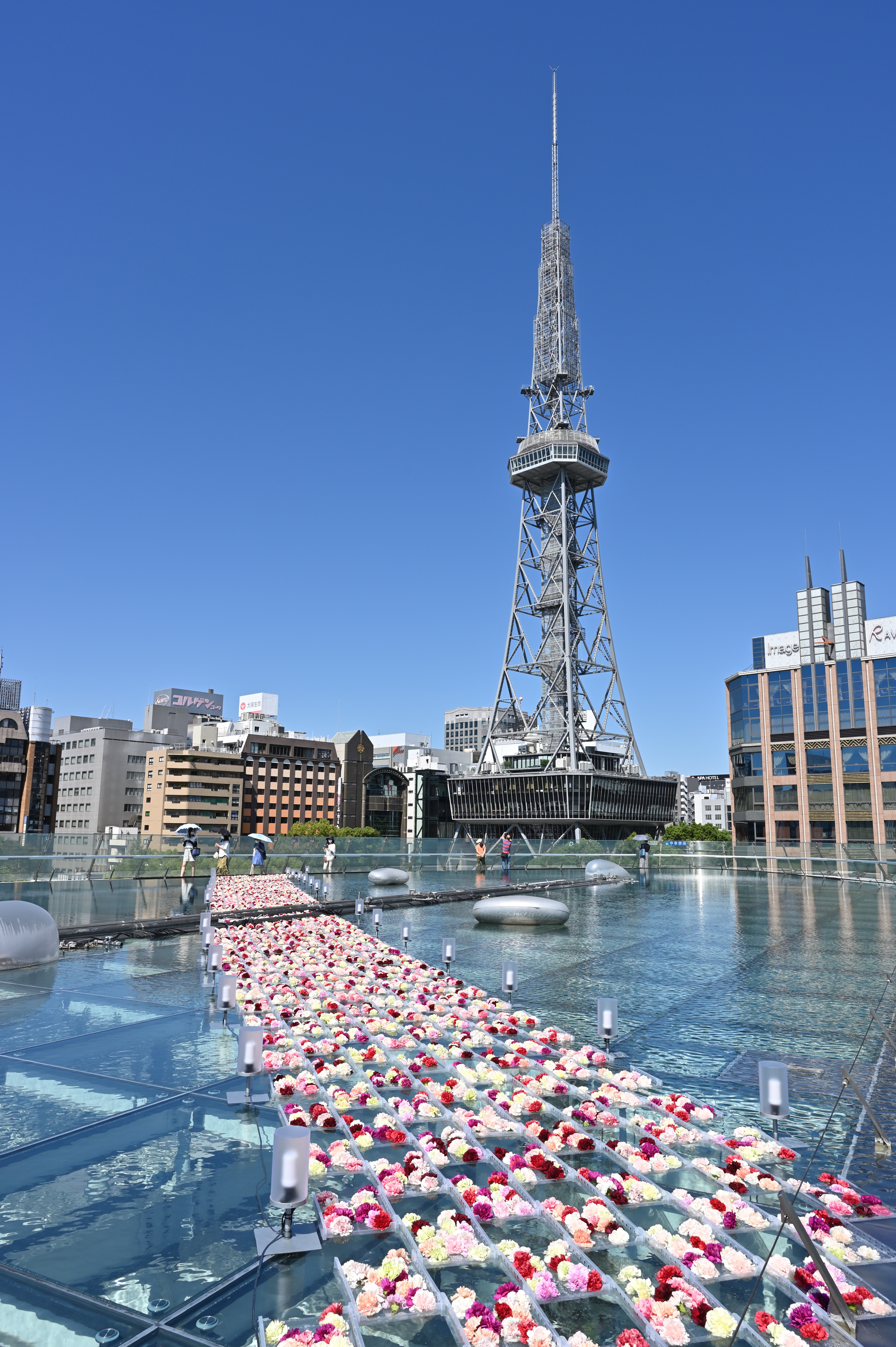
Oasis 21 and Nagoya TV Tower

Oasis 21 is a modern facility located adjacent to Nagoya TV Tower in Sakae, Nagoya which was opened to the public in 2002. It contains restaurants, stores, and a bus terminal, as well as an area for tourist information.

The building is mostly underground, constructed in front of the Aichi Arts Center and facing the Hisaya Ōdori Park.

The roof is a large oval glass structure that floats above ground level. It is filled with water to create an interesting visual effect and to cool down the temperature of the shopping area and the public space for various events known as "Milky Way Square" below in the summer.
