= Michael Behrens =

Michael Behrens may refer to:

- Michael Behrens (sculptor) (born 1973), German sculptor
- Michael Behrens (banker) (1911–1989), British financier, banker and stockbroker
