= Leonardo's horse =

Unfinished sculpture by Leonardo da Vinci

Coordinates: 45°28′51″N 9°07′47″E

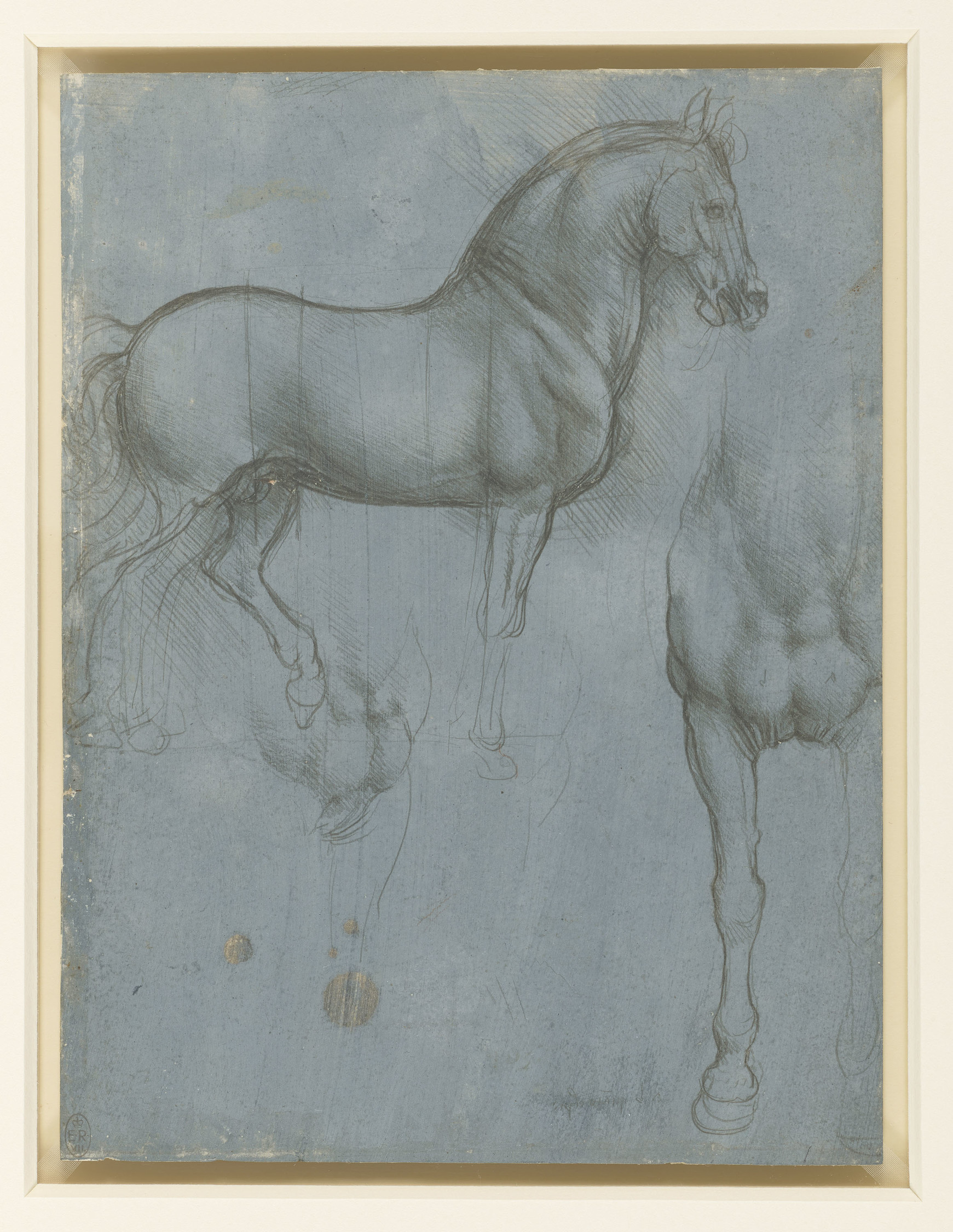
Leonardo da Vinci's study in silverpoint for The Horse, c. 1488

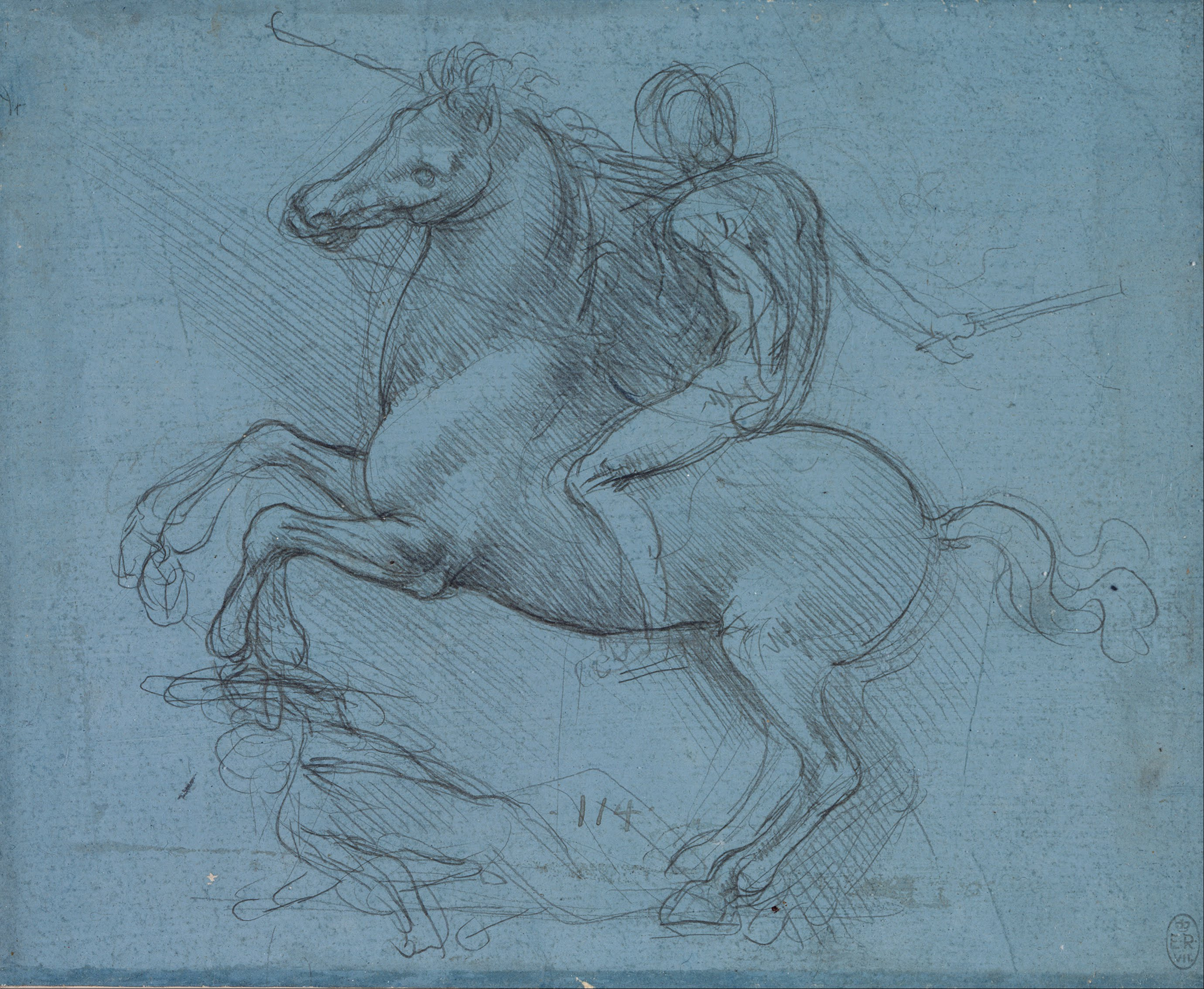
Study in silverpoint for the monument (abandoned design), c. 1490

Leonardo's Horse (also known as the Sforza Horse or the Gran Cavallo ("Great Horse") ) is a project for a bronze sculpture that was commissioned from Leonardo da Vinci in 1482 by the Duke of Milan Ludovico il Moro, but never completed. It was intended to be the largest equestrian statue in the world, a monument to the duke's father Francesco Sforza. Leonardo did extensive preparatory work for it but produced only a large clay model, which was later destroyed.

About five centuries later, Leonardo's surviving designs were used as the basis for sculptures intended to bring the project to fruition.

== History ==
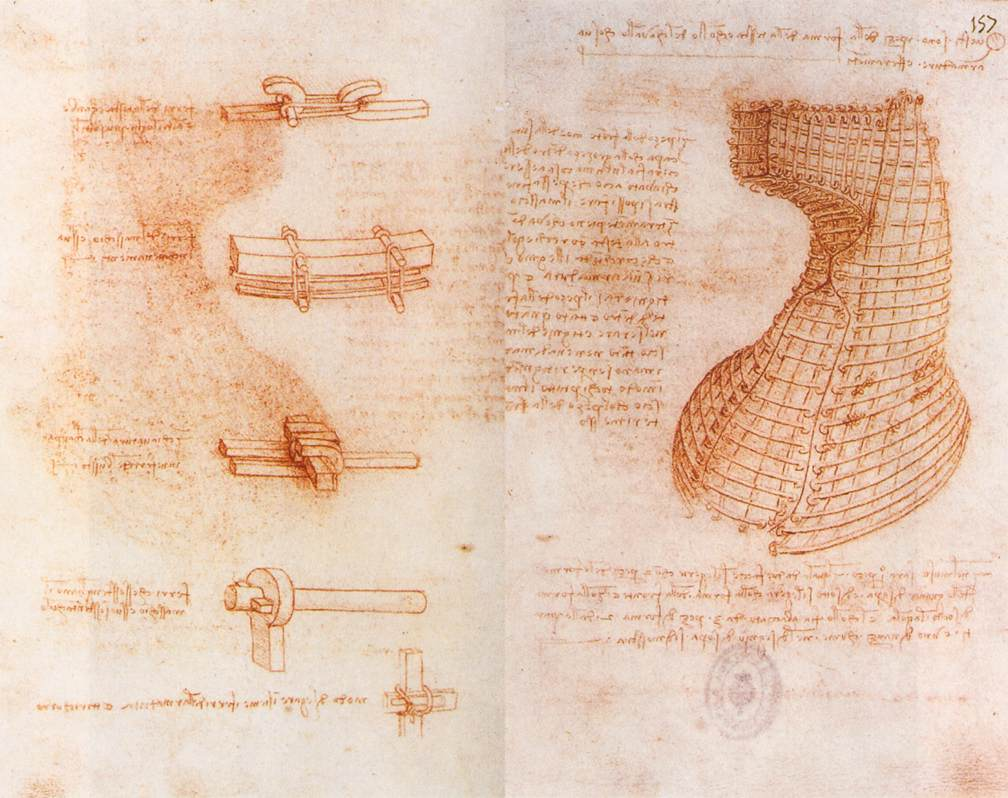
Sketched plan of cast for the head portion of the horse (right)

An equestrian monument was commissioned of Leonardo da Vinci in 1482 by Duke of Milan Ludovico il Moro. It was intended to be the largest equestrian statue in the world, a monument to the duke's father Francesco Sforza. Seventy tons of bronze were collected by Ludovico for casting the statue, which approached 8 metres (26 ft) in height, dwarfing earlier horse monuments by Donatello and by Leonardo's former master, Verrocchio. (Note: Leonardo had still been Verrocchio's pupil when his master received the commission, and probably saw the initial plans for it; however, the statue was still only a model in 1483, and not completed until after Verrocchio's 1488 death.) Leonardo initially planned a more dynamic design than those of his predecessors, initially including a fallen soldier to support the rearing horse, but at some point acquiesced to a more traditional walking horse.

In preparation for the work, Leonardo studied horses, and wrote a treatise on horse anatomy. Another treatise, titled Of Weight, included detailed plans for casting the statue, which would have been done in separate hollow pieces and featured iron braces for internal support. (Note: Rediscovered in the National Library of Spain in March 1967) By November 1493, a full-size clay model of the horse (without its rider) was exhibited at one of the Sforzas' weddings, gaining Leonardo significant fame. In a 20 December 1493 note by Leonardo, he stated his readiness to begin the casting process, but in November 1494, Ludovico gave the bronze to his father-in-law Ercole d'Este to be used to forge cannons to defend the city from the invasion of Charles VIII. Leonardo's rival Michelangelo encountered him at some point in Florence, and insulted him by implying that he was unable to perform the casting. (Note: "You made a design for a horse to be cast in bronze, and, unable to cast it, you have in your shame abandoned it. And to think that those Milanese capons believed you!" (Wallace 1972, p. 76))

The clay model was used as an archery target by French soldiers when they invaded Milan in 1499 at the beginning of the Second Italian War; it was afterward destroyed by cycles of rains and subsequent freezes. In 1511, Leonardo undertook an equestrian monument as a tomb for Gian Giacomo Trivulzio, for which he again designed a rearing pose and supporting victim—but this was never modelled due to a confederation of Swiss, Spanish, and Venetian forces driving the French from Milan.

== Influence and modern versions ==
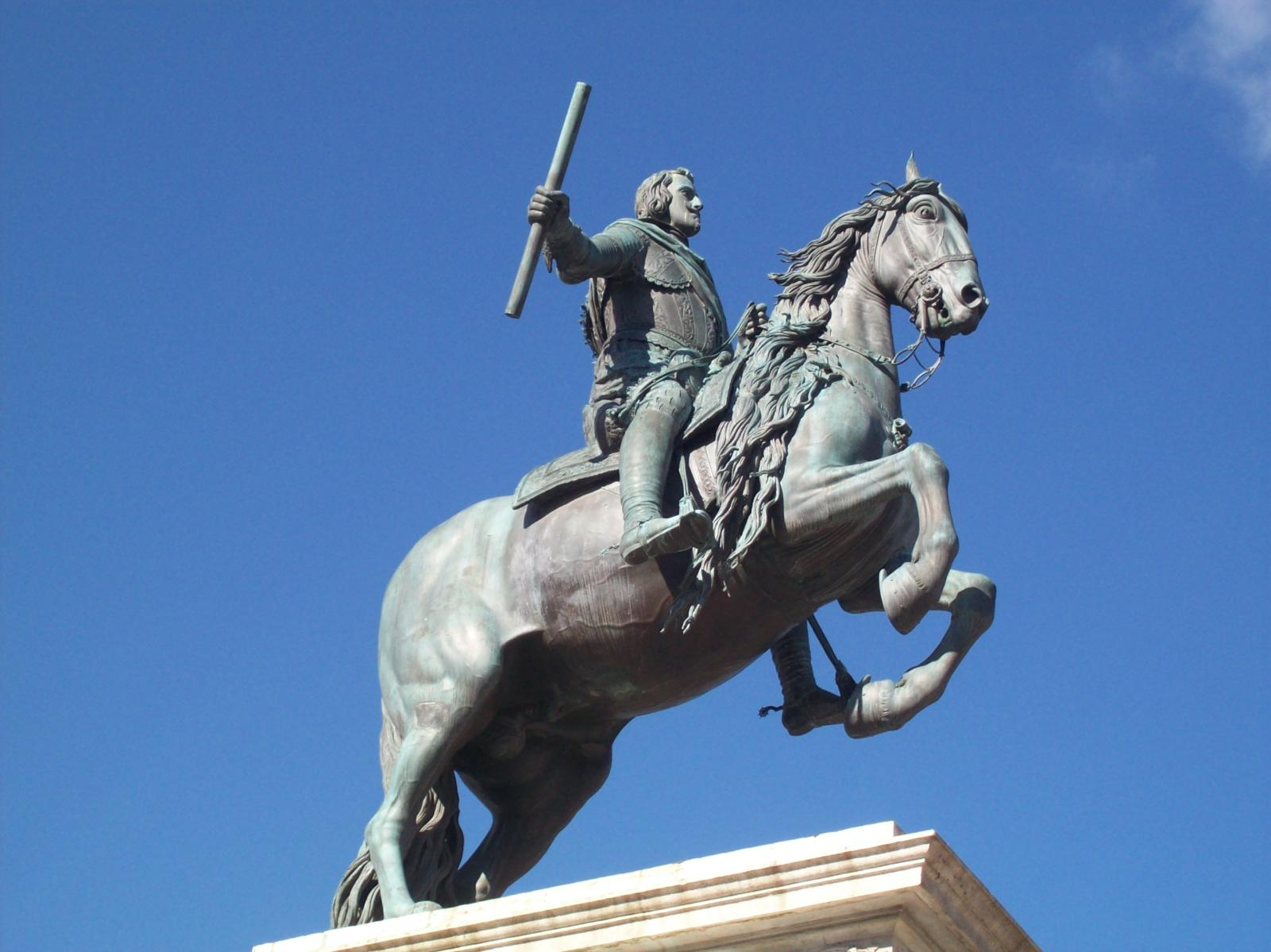
The equestrian monument by Pietro Tacca

In 1640, Pietro Tacca built the first equestrian monument featuring a (freestanding) rearing horse and King Philip IV of Spain, for which Galileo Galilei helped compute gravitational solutions—similar to Leonardo's—to deal with its offset weight. Étienne Maurice Falconet's Bronze Horseman accomplishes a similar feat, although neither reach the physical scale of Leonardo's design.

About five centuries after the original project failed, Leonardo's surviving design materials were used as the basis for sculptures intended to bring the project to fruition.

=== The Horse ===
In 1977, Charles C. Dent—an amateur artist, art collector and flying enthusiast—read in the September issue of National Geographic its feature article on the history of Leonardo's horse and statue. Dent then began a project to re-create the unfinished sculpture in his home town, Allentown, Pennsylvania, and founded the nonprofit organization Leonardo da Vinci's Horse, Inc. (LDVHI) to support the project. His efforts to grow the organization to finance the project proved a difficult task that required more than 15 years.

Dent's projected cost for the horse came to nearly US$2.5 million. He had a domed studio/workshop constructed in Allentown within which he personally began to conceptualize the re-creation and initial modelling of the sculpture. In 1988, he enlisted sculptor/painter Garth Herrick to begin part-time work on the horse. When Charles Dent died of Lou Gehrig's disease on December 25, 1994, he left his private art collection to LDVHI, the sale of which brought more than $1 million to the fund. The LDVHI Board acted on its promise to Dent to complete Dent’s vision.

By 1997, Tallix Art Foundry, in Beacon, New York, the company contracted by LDVHI to cast the horse, had suggested bringing Nina Akamu, an experienced animal sculptor, on board to improve upon the Dent-Herrick horse. After several months. Nina Akamu determined that the original model could not be salvaged and concluded that a completely new sculpture needed to be executed.

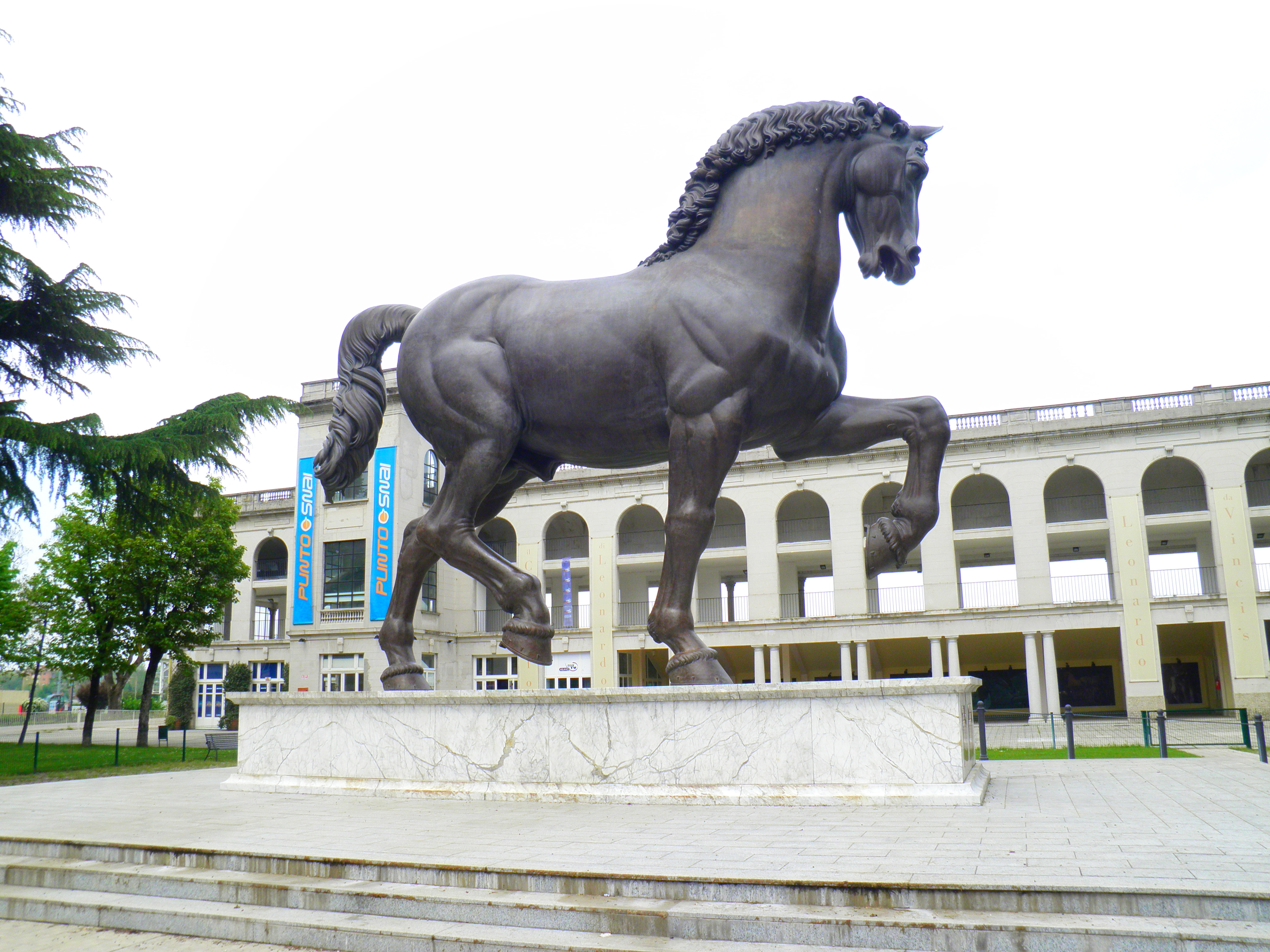
Leonardo's Horse in Milan

Leonardo had made numerous small sketches of horses to help illustrate his notes about the complex procedures for molding and casting the sculpture. But his notes were far from systematic, and none of the sketches points to the final position of the horse, with no single definitive drawing of the statue. Akamu researched multiple information sources to gain insight into the original sculptor's intentions. She studied both Leonardo's notes and drawings of the horse and those of other projects he was working on. She reviewed his thoughts on anatomy, painting, sculpture, and natural phenomena. Her research expanded to include the teachers who had influenced Leonardo. Akamu also studied Iberian horse breeds, such as the Andalusian, which were favored by the Sforza stables in the late 15th century.

Two full-size casts were made of Akamu's 24-foot (7.3 m) design. The primary cast – The Horse – was placed at the Hippodrome of San Siro in Milan, and unveiled on September 10, 1999.

The Da Vinci Science Center in Allentown, Pennsylvania, holds the rights to Leonardo da Vinci's Horse as a result of its 2003 merger with LDVHI.

Additional renderings of The Horse of different sizes are displayed in the United States and Italy.

=== The American Horse ===
The American Horse at the Frederik Meijer Gardens and Sculpture Park in Grand Rapids, Michigan

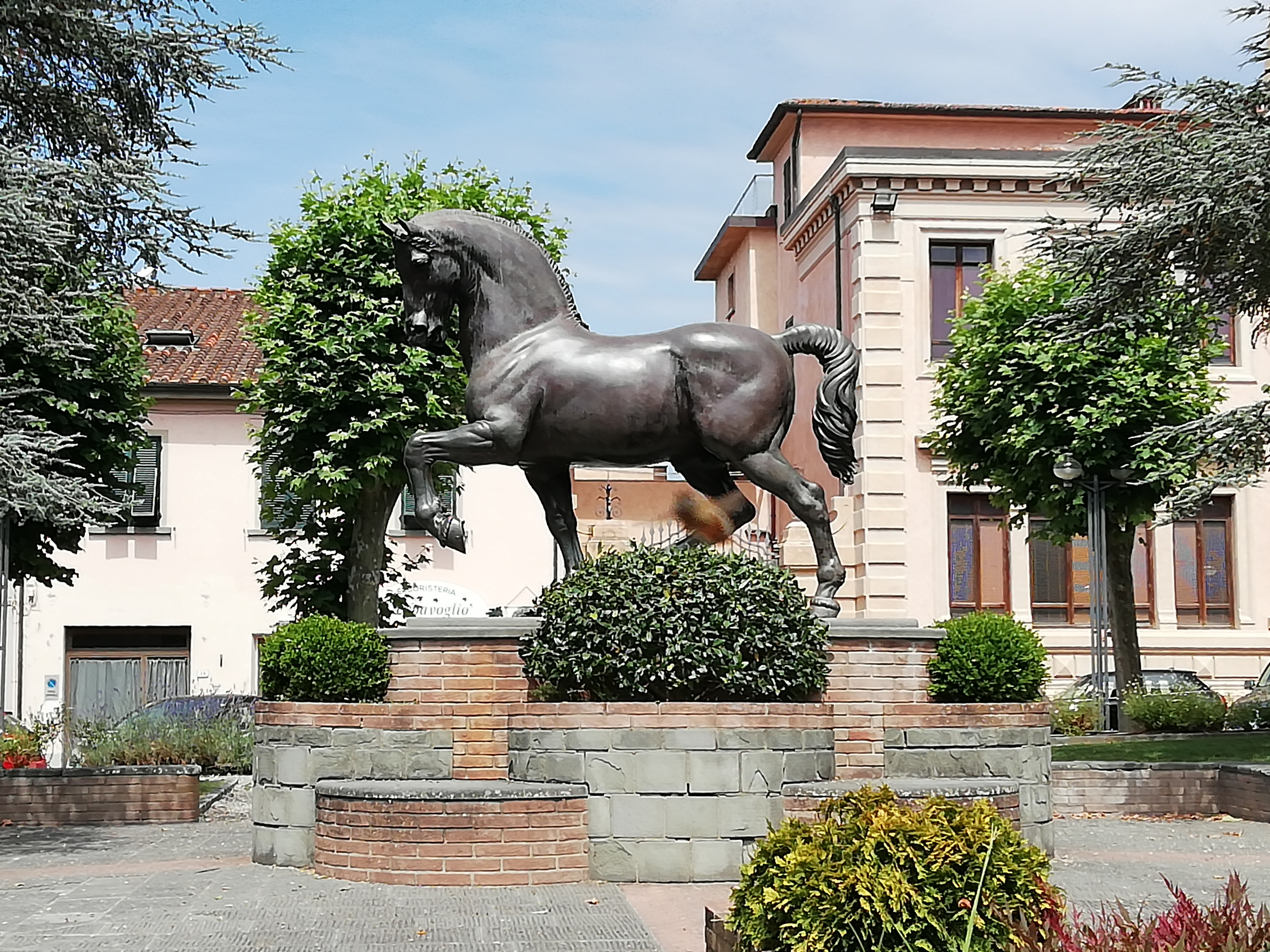
A copy of the Horse in Vinci

The second full-size cast of Nina Akamu's design became known as The American Horse, which was commissioned by philanthropist Frederik Meijer and was placed at the Frederik Meijer Gardens and Sculpture Park, a botanical garden and sculpture park in Grand Rapids, Michigan on October 7, 1999.

=== The Vinci Horse ===
A 2.5-metre (8 ft) bronze version of the sculpture stands in Leonardo's birthplace, Vinci, Tuscany, Italy, where it was dedicated on November 17, 2001. Made possible with gifts from several benefactors, including Peter F. Secchia, the former United States Ambassador to Italy, and his wife, Joan, The Vinci horse inspired a sister city relationship between Vinci, Italy, and Allentown, Pennsylvania. A plaza in Vinci also was named in the memory of Charles C. Dent.

=== The Baum School Horse ===
A 12-foot (3.6 m) replica was placed in Charles C. Dent's hometown of Allentown, Pa. in the Charles C. Dent Memorial Garden at The Baum School of Art, where it was dedicated on October 4, 2002.

=== The Da Vinci Science Center Horse ===
The Da Vinci Science Center – the organization that is shaped by the merger of LDVHI and what was then known as the Discovery Center of Science and Technology – displays a three-foot (1 m) replica of The Horse in its main lobby, which was dedicated when the science center opened its current location on October 30, 2005. The Da Vinci Science Center's sculpture also has appeared on loan at Discovery Times Square in New York City, New York, and at The Franklin Institute in Philadelphia, Pennsylvania.

=== The Wyoming Horse ===
An eight-foot-tall (2.5 m) replica of The Horse was placed in Sheridan, Wyoming, where it was dedicated on August 20, 2014. The Wyoming Horse was commissioned by the Wyoming Community Foundation on behalf of the Sheridan Public Arts Committee.

=== Sforza Equestrian Statue ===
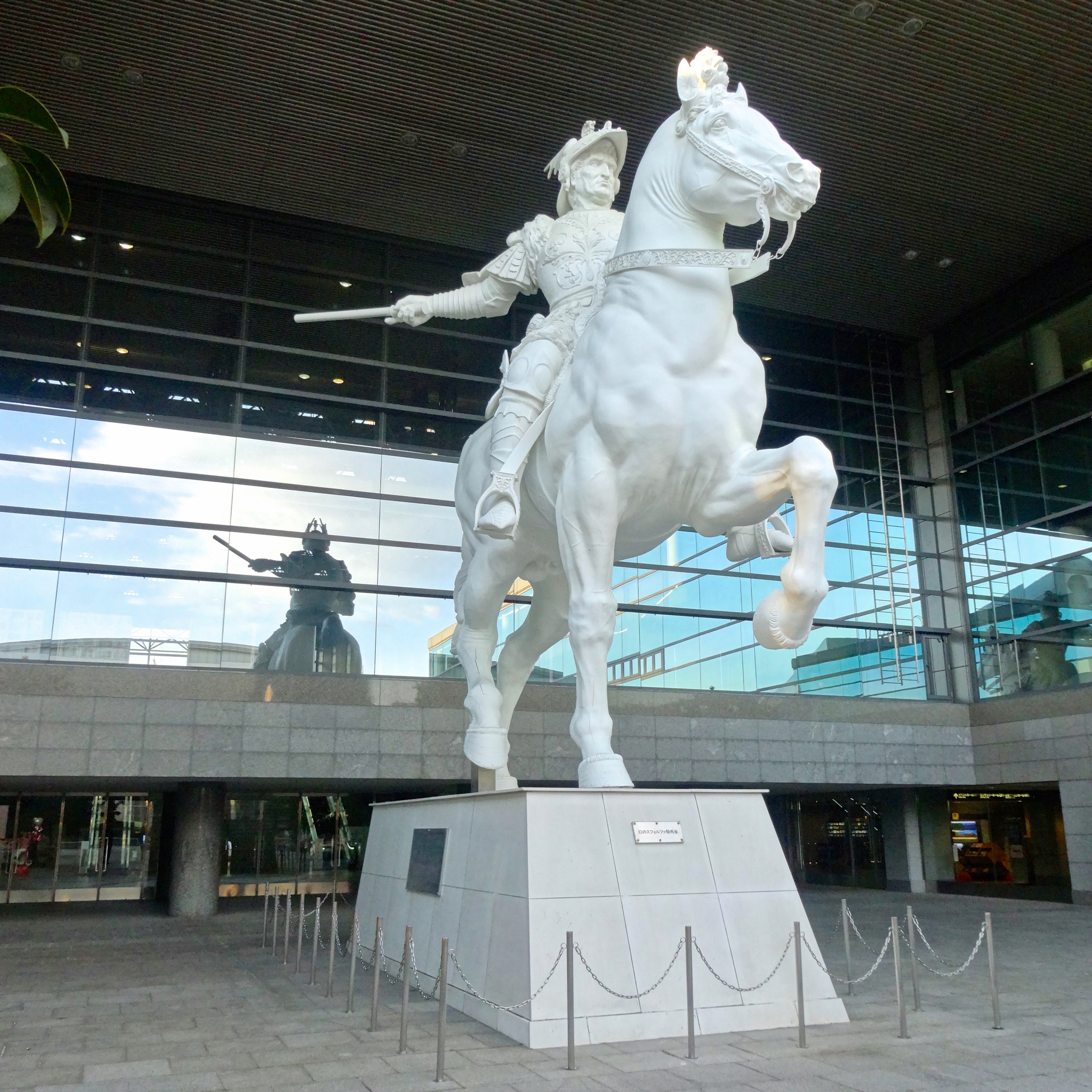

In 1989, to commemorate the 100th anniversary of Nagoya's municipal status, an attempt was made to restore it for exhibition at World Design Exhibition 1989 by Hidemichi Tanaka, Hideho Aso, Masato Kageyama, and Akio Ishizuka. First, a clay statue 2 meters tall was created based on manuscripts and drawings discovered in Madrid in 1967, and then a computer-enlarged version of this statue was produced. However, after calculating the weight, it was determined that the legs would not be able to withstand the weight if it were made of bronze, so the material was changed to Fibre-reinforced plastic (FRP) before completion. The completed model measures 8.3m in height, 3.6m in width, and 8.8m in length. After completion, it was exhibited at the Tokai Bank Pavilion of the World Design Exposition. After the expo ended, it was donated by Tokai Bank to the Nagoya Congress Center, where it is on display in the courtyard..

=== Additional interpretations ===
Another 24-foot-high recreation (7.3 m) of the Sforza horse, based on different design interpretation, was manufactured by the Opera Laboratori Fiorentini S.p.A., in collaboration with Polo Museale Fiorentino and the Institute and Museum of the History of Science in Florence, Italy. It is made of steel frame with special resin coated fibreglass, to make it look like bronze. It is made of six pieces and can be transported and re-assembled. It has been on display at various locations during exhibitions on Leonardo. Some of the venues have been;

1. "The Mind of Leonardo" at the Museum of Modern Art, Debrecen, Hungary. (August 16 to December 2, 2007).
2. "Leonardo: 500 Years into the Future" at the Tech Museum, San Jose, California, USA (September 27, 2008 to January 25, 2009)
3. "The Mind of Leonardo" at the Palazzo Venezia, Rome, Italy (1 May to August 30, 2009)
4. "Leonardo da Vinci – Hand of the Genius" Sifly Piazza at the High Museum of Art in Atlanta, (October 6, 2009 to February 6, 2010).

== See also ==
- List of works by Leonardo da Vinci
- Grave Stele of Dexileos
- Horse and Rider (wax sculpture)
- Rearing Horse and Mounted Warrior
- Horses in art
- Vebjørn Sand Da Vinci Project
