= Michael Behrens (sculptor) =

German sculptor working with glass

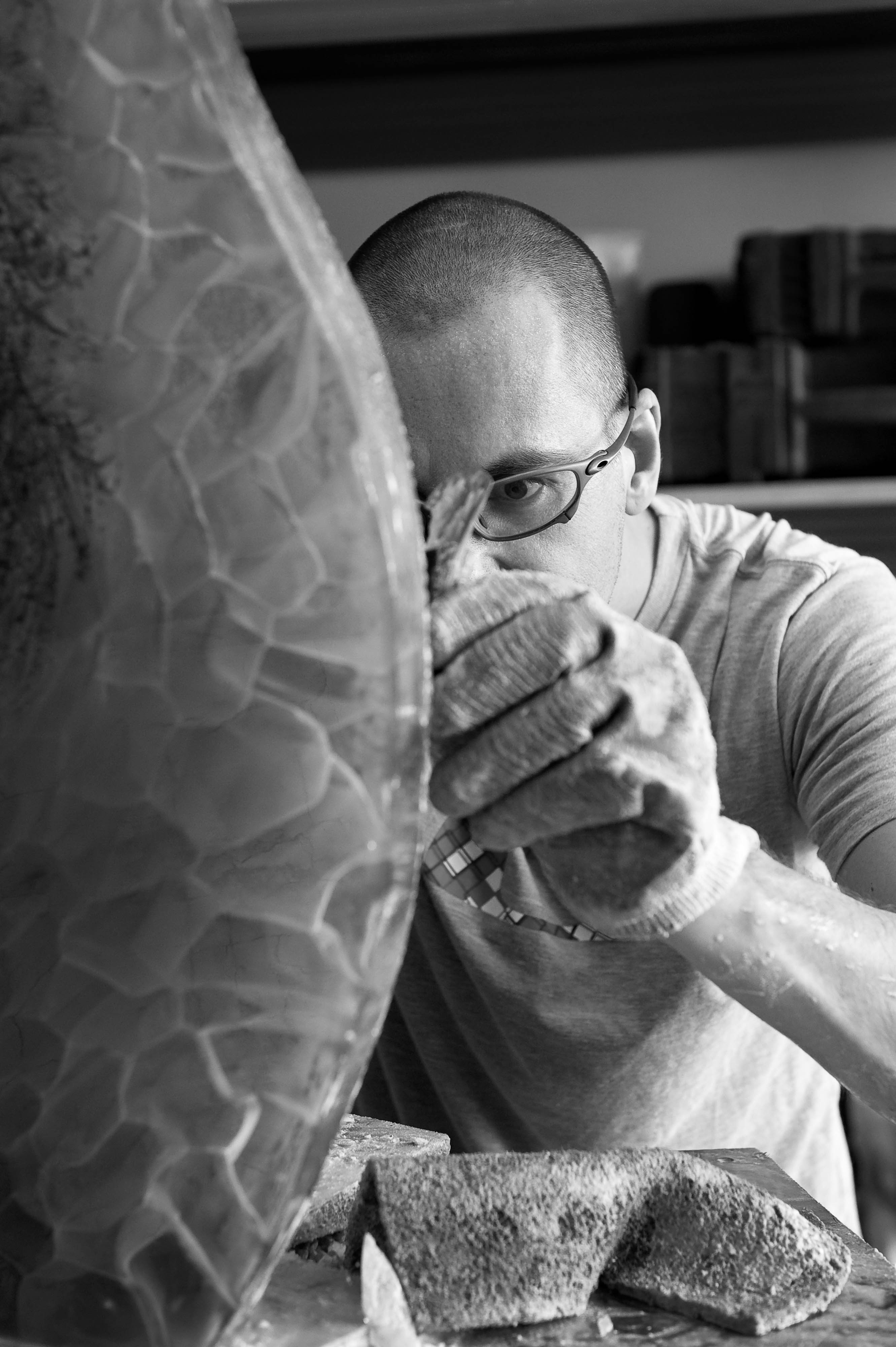
Michael Behrens, portrait, 2012

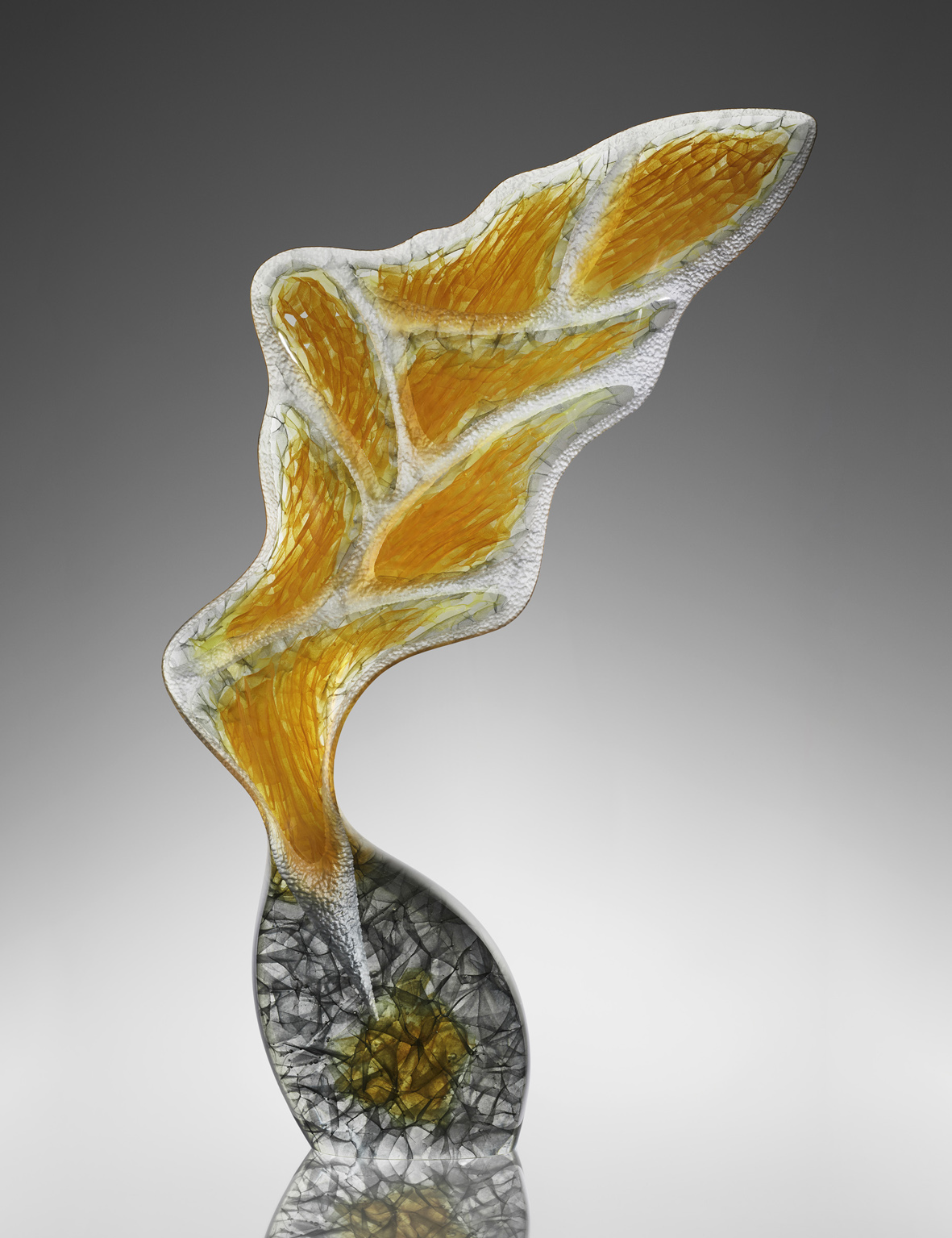
Michael Behrens, Seaforms 268, 2018, 136 x 86 x 19 cm

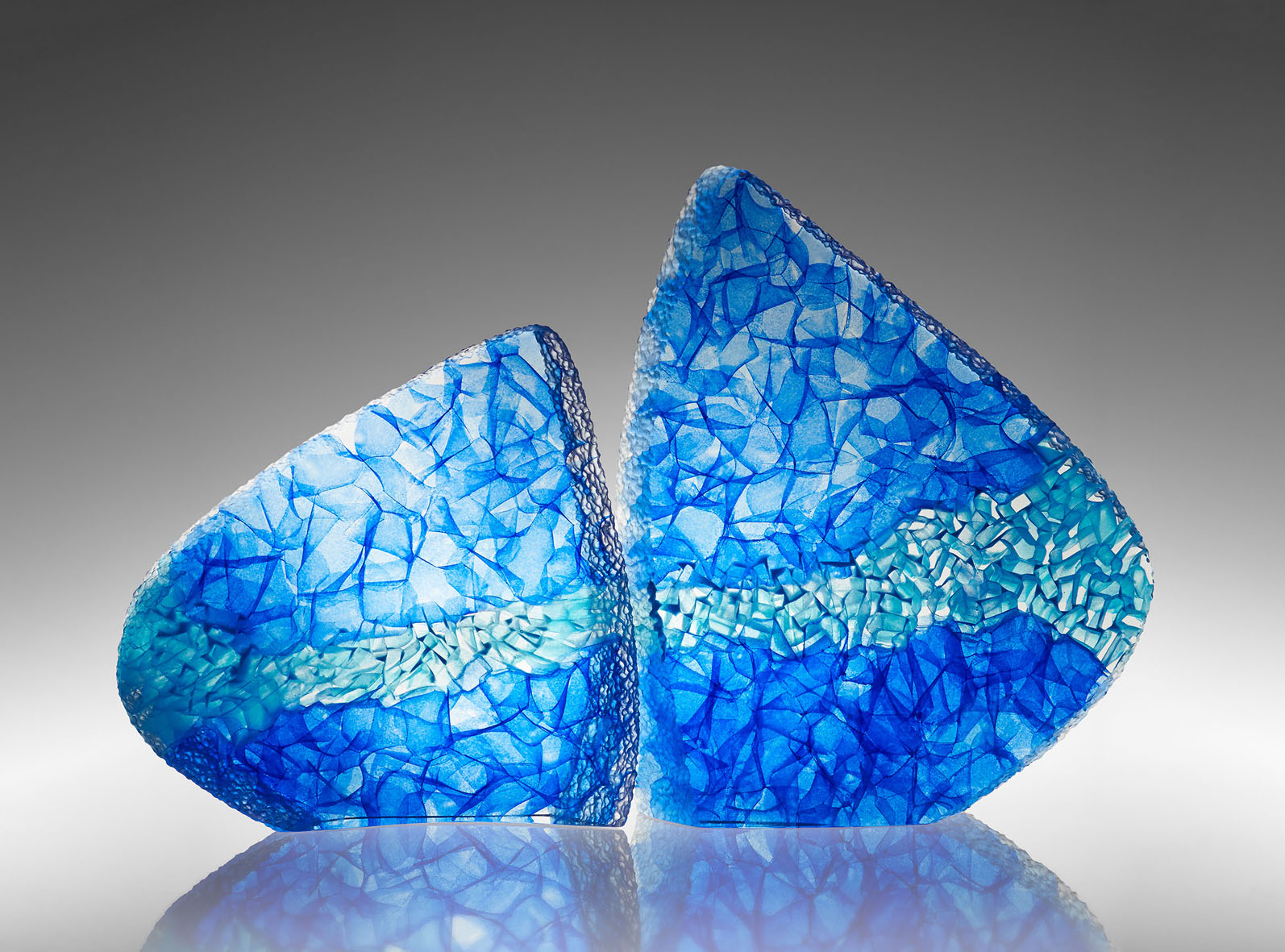
Michael Behrens, Seaforms 31, 2012, 67 × 104 × 17 cm

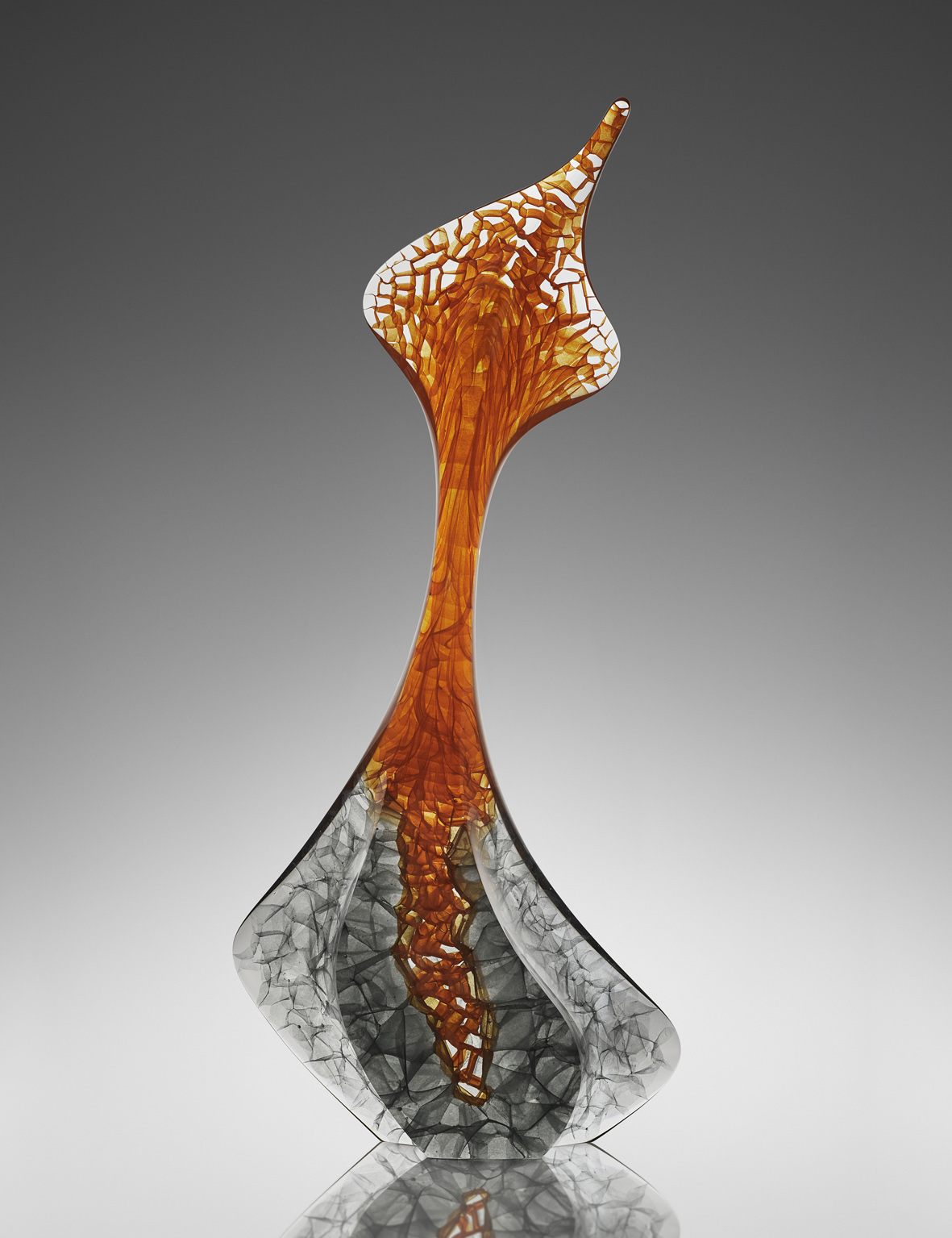
Michael Behrens, Seaforms 298, 2019, 124 x 54 x 20 cm

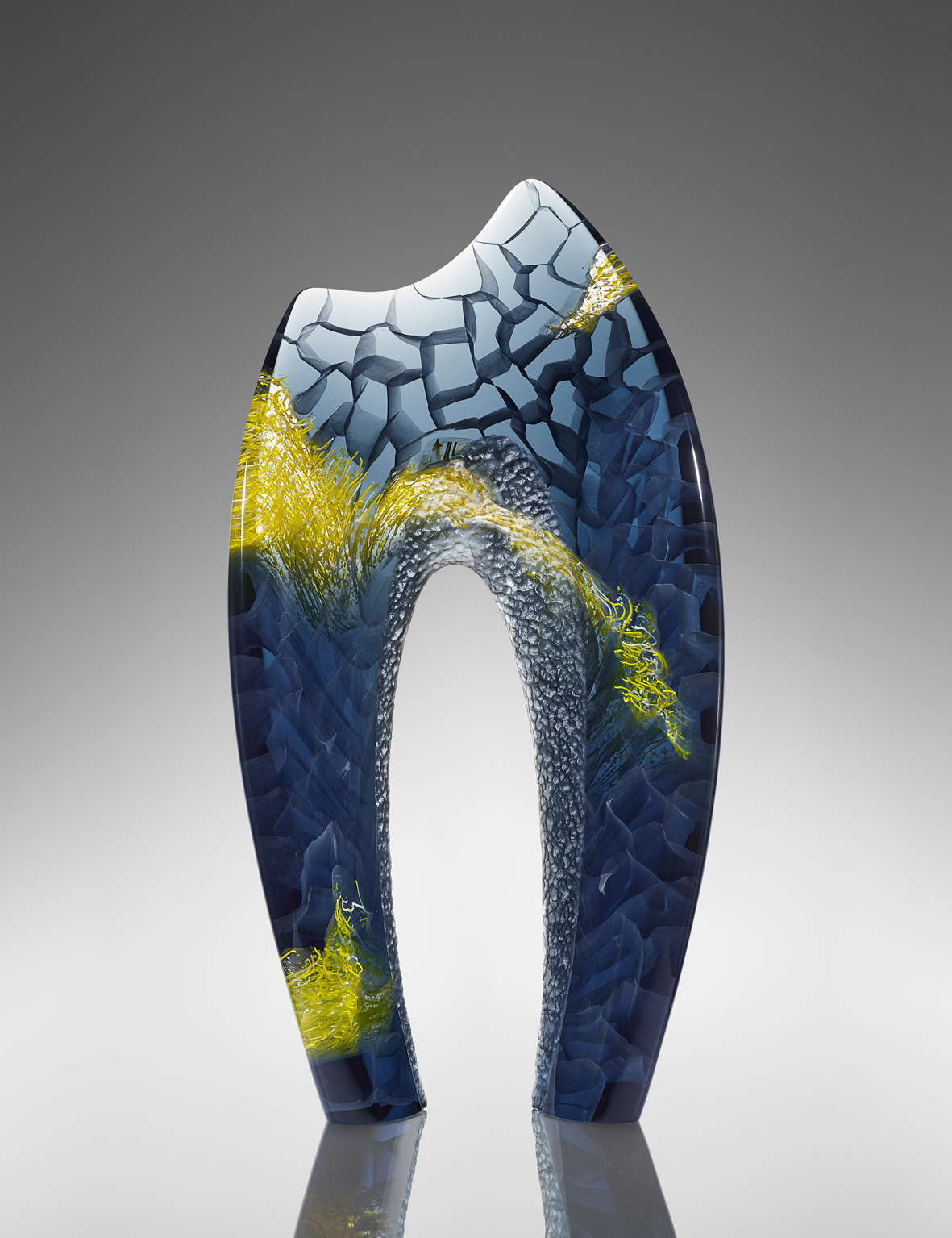
Michael Behrens, Seaforms 259, 2017, 70 x 36 x 13 cm

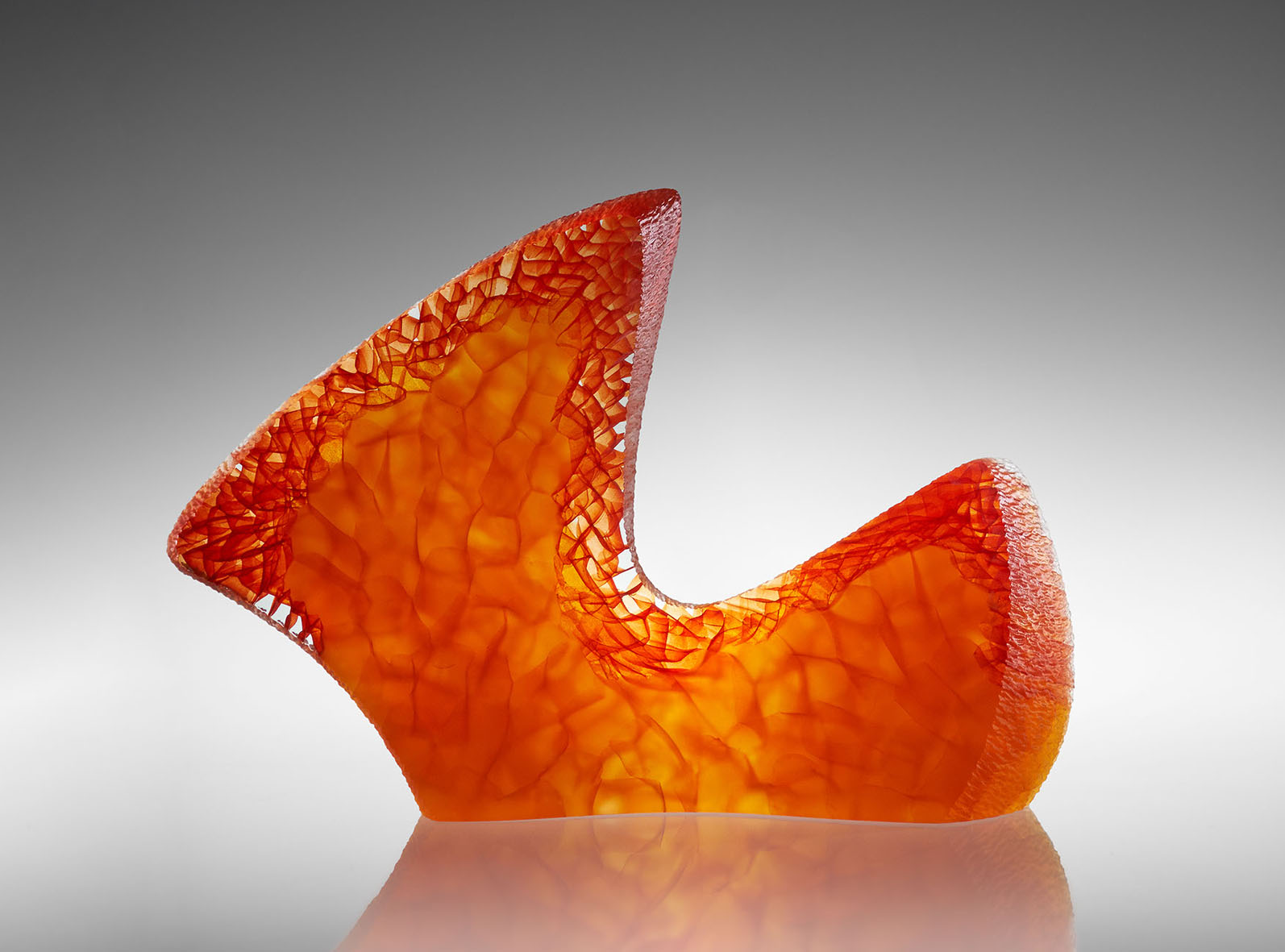
Michael Behrens, Seaforms 54, 2012, 56 × 84 × 20 cm

Michael Behrens (born 1973) is a German sculptor working with glass. He works internationally, mainly in Europe and North America.

== Early life and education ==
Michael Behrens was born in 1973 in Düsseldorf, Germany.

From 1999 he studied at the Academy of Fine Arts in Maastricht, Netherlands, where he graduated with a bachelor's degree in 2003. During this time, he enjoyed photography and painting, before discovering his love for sculpture.

== Career ==
Behrens began experimenting with sculpture in 2002. Behrens's sculptural work initially focused primarily on the internal structure of the objects. His Seaforms series focuses more on the form of the outer shape. With Phoenix, Behrens devoted himself to the abstracted form of the object. The relationship between shape and content is of high importance in Behrens's work.

In 2004 and 2007, Behrens worked as a project supervisor for Ethiopian Reflections in Addis Abeba, Ethiopia.

In 2006, he established his own studio in Dusseldorf, and two years later, after his first solo exhibition in Paris, France, he was invited to exhibit his work at the Ernsting Foundation.

In 2008 and 2009, he was assigned as a lecturer at the Faculty of Architecture – Plastic Shaping at the Technical University (TU) Darmstadt.

Behrens has participated in international art fairs such as the Art Palm Beach (Florida, US), Form Miami (Florida, US), SOFA Chicago (Illinois, US), Pan Amsterdam (Netherlands), Art Breda (Netherlands), Art Vienna (Austria), Art & Antique Hofburg (Austria) and Art Münster (Germany). His work is part of public collections including the Museum Kunst Palast in Düsseldorf, the Ernsting Stiftung in Coesfeld, Germany, the Imagine Museum in Saint Petersburg, the Novotný Museum in Nový Bor, the MusVerre in Sars-Poteries and the Seven Bridges Foundation in Greenwich, Connecticut/US.

=== Works ===
Phoenix In Phoenix the sculpture is reduced to a minimal form and then extra care is provided for whereby its plasticity comes to the fore. Behrens produces contrasting works made of crystal by deliberate abandonment of color in the classical sense and the interplay of convex and concave surfaces in black and gold.

Seaforms The Seaforms series embodies decades of Behrens's personal sensory experiences above and below water. The diverse color range and interior movement varies as if created organically by the environment while each shape and structure provide a strong appearance. The natural and random appearance of the artist's works is created by the exterior form and the specific details: The fine modeling of the subareas and edges, the interplay of matt and polished surfaces as well as the cell-like structures emerging from fusing of the glass sections.

Landscapes In addition to glass objects, Behrens furthermore creates two-dimensional works abstracting photo material from satellite images and maps.

=== Technique ===
Behrens produces all his artworks at his studio in Düsseldorf where he his a custom-built furnaces. Each piece undergoes several complex production phases: The sculptural work on a rigid foam model, the production of the melting molds, the arrangement of pre-processed glass pieces in the melting mold, the actual melting and cooling processes as well as the finish by grinding, polishing and/or sandblasting. The production of a single sculpture usually takes several months.

== Awards ==
- Fort Wayne Museum Award, 42nd Annual International Glass Invitational Award Exhibition, with Habatat Galleries Michigan, US, 2014
- Frederik Meijer Award 41st Annual International Glass Invitational Award Exhibition", with Habatat Galleries Michigan, US, 2013
- Collector's Choice 40th Annual International Glass Invitational Award Exhibition, with Habatat Galleries Michigan, US, 2012
- Kalamazoo Institute of Arts Award, 39th Annual International Glass Invitational Award Exhibition, with Habatat Galleries Michigan, US, 2011
- 1st Prize, Arts and Crafts state award North Rhine-Westphalia, Kevelaer, Germany, 2009
- 3rd Immenhäuser Glass Award, Germany, 2009
- Jutta Cuny-Franz Memorial Award Selected Entries, Germany, 2009
- 1st Prize Glass Art Prize Glasveredler 2008 Glasstec, Germany, 2008
- Innovation Glass Art Prize Weru, Germany, 2007

== Selected exhibitions ==
- 2019: Continuum Gallery, Königswinter, Germany, Solo Show
- 2019: Barbara Achilles Foundation, Hamburg, Germany, Solo Show
- 2019: Schantz Galleries, Stockbridge, Massachusetts, US, Group Show
- 2018: Cini Foundation, Venice, Italy, Group Show
- 2018: Fort Wayne Museum of Art, Fort Wayne, Indiana, US, Group Show
- 2017: Habatat Galleries, Royal Oak, Michigan, US, Solo Show
- 2017: Etienne Gallery Oisterwijk, Netherlands, Solo Show
- 2016: Ernsting Foundation, New Additions 2015, Coesfeld, Germany, Group Show
- 2016: Plateaux Gallery, London, United Kingdom, Group Show
- 2015: Sikabonyi Gallery, Vienna, Austria, Solo Show
- 2015: Sandra Ainsley Gallery, Toronto, Canada, Group Show
- 2014: Etienne Gallery Oisterwijk, Netherlands, Solo Show
- 2014: Novotný Museum, Nový Bor, Czech Republic, Group Show
- 2013: Museum Kunstpalast, Düsseldorf, Germany, Group Show
- 2013: Frederik Meijer Gardens & Sculpture Park, Grand Rapids, Michigan, US, Group Show
- 2012: Continuum Gallery, Königswinter, Germany, Solo Show
- 2012: LWL – Museum, Glashütte Gernheim, Germany, Group Show
- 2010: Van Loon Gallery, Vucht, Netherlands, Solo Show
- 2010: Museum Kunstpalast, Düsseldorf, Germany, Group Show
- 2008: Ernsting Foundation, Coesfeld, Germany, Solo Show

== Bibliography ==
- Continuum Gallery (2019). Michael Behrens - Phoenix & Seaforms. Königswinter/Germany, ISBN 978-3-9820728-0-7
- Dr Ricke, Helmut (2008). Underwaterworld & Icebergs – Michael Behrens & Peter Bremers. Exhibition catalogue, Ernsting Stiftung
- Glasmuseum Hentrich (2008). Recent acquisitions of glass sculpture at the Glasmuseum Hentrich. Glasmuseum Hentrich
- Dr von Kerssenbrock-Krosigk, Dedo. Michael Behrens (2009).The Burlington Magazine, Issue 1275, Vol. 151, pp. 394/95
- Stiftung Museum Kunstpalast (2010). GLASpekte – Künstler aus Nordrhein-Westfahlen in Dialog mit Arbeiten aus dem Glasmuseum Hentrich. Stiftung Museum Kunst Palast
- Elliott, Kate; Rogers, Michael; Jeff Wallin, Jeff (2010). E-Merge 2010 – A Showcase of Rising Talents in Kiln-Glass. Bullseye Glass
- LWL-Indutriemuseum (2012). Rotation SiO2 – 200 Jahre Glashütte Gernheim. Klartext Press, ISBN 978-3-8375-0774-4
- Dr Ricke, Helmut (2012). Seaforms & Landscapes – Michael Behrens. Continuum Gallery
- Dr Ricke, Helmut (2012). Inspiration from the Deep Sea and Outer Space. Neues Glas, Issue 3, pp. 36–43
- Hampson, Ferdinand (2014). Studio Glass Evolving. American Art Collector, Issue 109, pp. 171–174
- Sikabonyi, Andre (2015). Seaforms & Landscapes, Vernissage, Issue 324, pp. 14–17
- Habatat Galleries (2015). The Creative Process – 43rd International Catalogue, ISBN 978-1-928572-07-7
- Ernsting Stiftung Alter Hof Herding (2016). Wer Hätte das gedacht! Coesfeld-Lette/Germany, ISBN 978-3-00-053374-7
- Habatat Galleries (2016). Insight – 44th International Invitational Award Exhibition. Royal Oak/MI/US, ISBN 978-1-928572-05-3
- Habatat Galleries (2017). NEXT – 45th International Invitational Award Exhibition. Royal Oak/MI/US, ISBN 978-1-928572-06-0
- Habatat Galleries (2017). Solid Thoughts. Royal Oak/MI/US, ISBN 978-1-928572-07-7. online catalog
