= Nina Akamu =

Japanese-American artist

- Born: 1955 (age 70–71); Midwest City, Oklahoma
- Education: Maryland Institute College of Art
- Known for: Sculpture
- Notable work: Leonardo's horse, Memorial to Japanese-American Patriotism in World War II
- Awards: Henry Herring Award, 2002
- Website: www.NinaAkamu.com

Nina Akamu (born 1955) is a Japanese-American artist known for her sculpting. She is presently living in Rhinebeck, New York.

== Early years and education ==
Nina Akamu was born in 1955 in Midwest City, Oklahoma. Her father was a career Air Force serviceman so she experienced a peripatetic lifestyle living in Hawaii and East Asia. At the age of 10 her family moved to Japan, where her passion for horseback riding was instilled (which would eventually lead to a passion for sculpting horses).

In 1969 her family was transferred back to the United States, moving to Dover, Delaware, where Akamu graduated high school. She studied with American painter and anatomist, Joseph Sheppard. She found her passion for sculpture in the final year of her education and received her Bachelor of Fine Arts in painting from the Maryland Institute College of Art in 1977.

== Career ==
Akamu moved to Florence, Italy in 1979 and eventually married Joseph Sheppard. The move to Italy was life changing. She began sculpting full-time, becoming a member of the National Sculpture Society in 1981. Moving to Pietrasanta, Italy in 1984, Akamu proceeded to expand on her skills and catalog of sculpture work. She lived in Italy for 12 years. She has been awarded numerous national awards for her sculptures. The cranes and memorial she created were recognized with the Henry Hering Award from the National Sculpture Society in 2002.

=== Leonardo's Horse ===
Leonardo da Vinci's Horse, Inc. (LDVHI) contracted Tallix Art Foundry in 1997 to cast a plaster horse created by retired airline pilot and founder Charles C Dent. As the sculpture was left incomplete at the time of his death and contained anatomical problems, Fred Meijer (patron of the bronze copy the American horse) suggested bringing Nina Akamu on board to improve upon the Dent-Herrick horse.

She moved to Beacon, New York to work on a full-scale sculpture of Leonardo's horse. After several months, Nina Akamu determined that the original model could not be salvaged and concluded that a completely new sculpture needed to be executed. She created an entirely new master model which was then enlarged to 24' tall. The colossal bronze horse was completed and dedicated in Milan, Italy and the Frederik Meijer Gardens and Sculpture Park in Grand Rapids, Michigan in September and October 1999.

Leonardo had made numerous small sketches of horses to help illustrate his notes about the complex procedures for molding and casting the sculpture. But his notes were far from systematic, and none of the sketches points to the final position of the horse, with no single definitive drawing of the statue. Akamu researched multiple information sources to gain insight into the original sculptor's intentions. She studied both Leonardo's notes and drawings of the horse and those of other projects he was working on. She reviewed his thoughts on anatomy, painting, sculpture and natural phenomena. Her research expanded to include the teachers who had influenced Leonardo. Akamu also studied Iberian horse breeds, such as the Andalusian, which were favored by the Sforza stables in the late 15th century.

Two full-size casts were made of Akamu's 24-foot (7.3 m) design. One was placed at the Hippodrome of San Siro in Milan. The other is at the Frederik Meijer Gardens & Sculpture Park, a botanical garden and sculpture park in Grand Rapids, Michigan.

A smaller replica – 12 feet (3.7 m) – was placed in downtown Allentown's Community Art Park adjacent to the Baum School of Art, in honor of Charles Dent. A bronze replica – 8 feet (2.4 m) – was installed 15 September 2001 at Piazza della Libertà in Vinci, Italy, the birth town of Leonardo.

== Memorial to Japanese-American Patriotism in World War II ==
Akamu's creation of the statue on the Memorial to Japanese-American Patriotism in World War II, shows two Grus japonensis birds. This work is located at Louisiana Avenue and D Street, Northwest, Washington, D.C. The memorial commemorates Japanese American war involvement, veterans and patriotism during World War II, as well as those held in Japanese American internment camps.

Akamu's grandfather, on her mother's side, was arrested in Hawaii during the internment program. He was sent to a relocation camp on Sand Island in Pearl Harbor. Suffering from diabetes upon his internment, he died of heart failure three months into his imprisonment. This family connection, combined with growing up for a time in Hawaii where in the early 1960s she fished with her father in the lochs of Pearl Harbor and the erection of a Japanese American war memorial near her home in Massa, Italy, inspired a strong connection to the memorial and its creation.

== See also ==
- Memorial to Japanese-American Patriotism in World War II
- National Sculpture Society
- Women artists
