= Frederik Meijer Gardens & Sculpture Park =

Museum and garden in Michigan, US

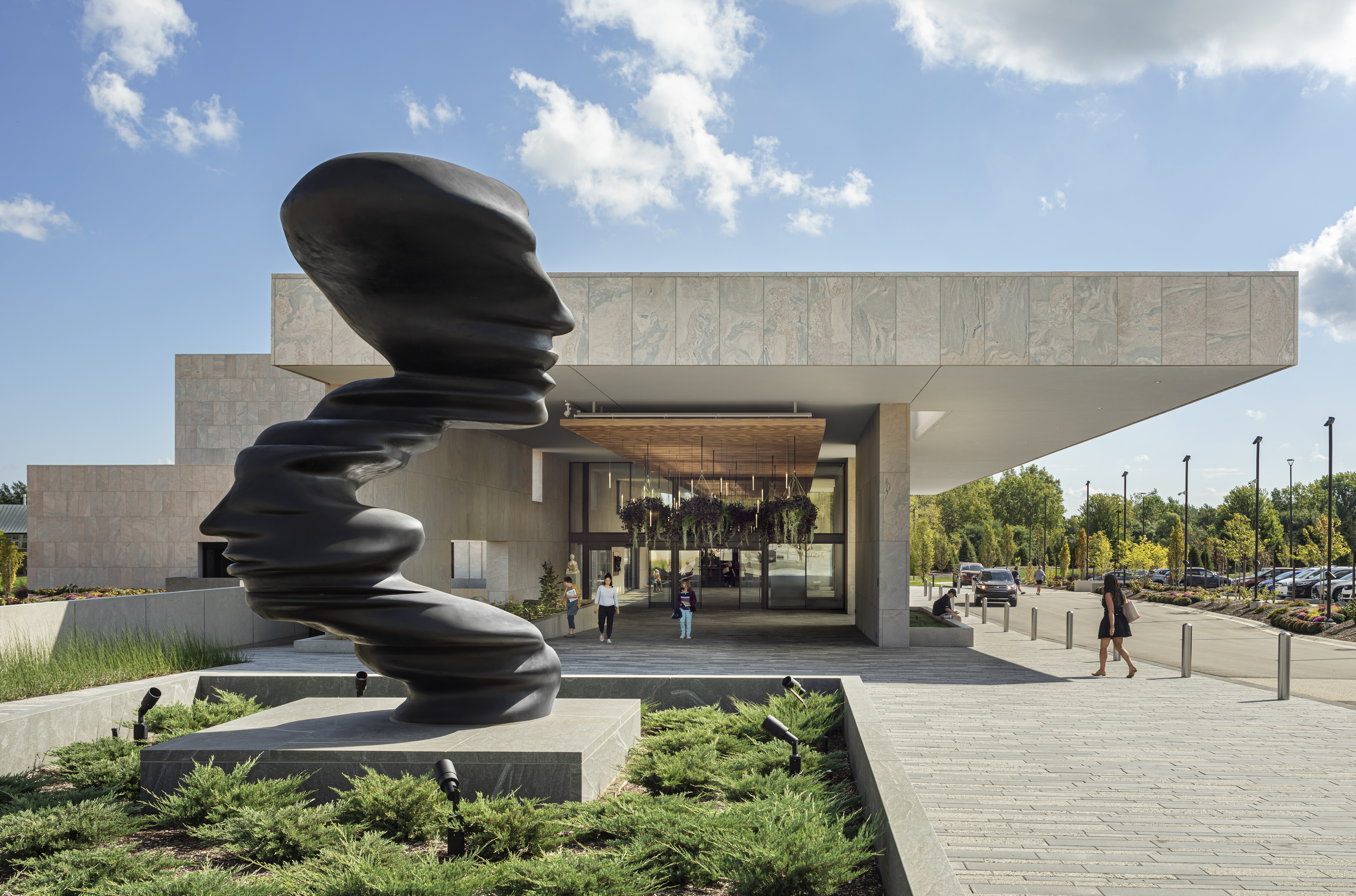
- Main Entrance

- Location within Michigan
- Established: 1995
- Location: 1000 East Beltline Ave NE; Grand Rapids, Michigan; United States
- Coordinates: 42.981°N 85.591°W
- Type: Art museum Botanical garden
- Key holdings: Iron Tree by Ai Weiwei; Galileo's Wedge & archives of Beverly Pepper
- Collections: Sculpture
- Collection size: 300
- Visitors: 881, 625 (2025)
- CEO: Charles Burke
- Curator: Suzanne Ramljak
- Architects: Cox, Medendorp & Olson; Tod Williams Billie Tsien Architects
- Parking: On site (no charge)
- Website: MeijerGardens.org

Frederik Meijer Gardens & Sculpture Park is a 158-acre (64 ha) botanical garden, art museum, and outdoor sculpture park located in Grand Rapids Township, Michigan, United States. Opened in 1995, Meijer Gardens quickly established itself in the Midwest as a major cultural attraction jointly focused on horticulture and sculpture.

Meijer Gardens and Sculpture Park includes a tropical conservatory, an 8-acre Japanese garden, major works of modern and contemporary sculpture on the grounds and indoors, along with a series of outdoor gardens and nature trails.

It is a well attended cultural site in Michigan, having attracted 750,000 visitors annually between 2015 - 2017. Meijer Gardens has continued to grow its permanent collection of sculpture from major figures in Modern and Contemporary art while building additional structures for indoor and outdoor gardens. In 2018, Meijer Gardens was included as one of "Eleven of the World's Greatest Sculpture Parks" by Artsy. In 2023, 2024, and 2025 USA Today voted the park the #1 Sculpture Park in the United States as part of their 10Best Readers Choice Awards.

== History ==
In the early 1980s, the West Michigan Horticultural Society, a non-profit organization in Grand Rapids, Michigan, was searching for a nearby site in order to establish a botanical garden and conservatory.

As early as 1986, a member of the Horticultural Society approached Frederik Meijer, (founder of Meijer grocery megastores), to request the donation of a parcel of land. The site, which contained a stream and wetland areas, had originally been earmarked by Meijer for the construction of a new superstore. However, an alternative location for the store was found, allowing the more environmentally sensitive lands to be used for the public garden.

In January 1991, Meijer, Inc. donated 70.7 acres (28.6 ha) of land in Grand Rapids Township, Michigan to establish the new public garden. A $13 million capital campaign to develop the land into a public park was led by Earl Holton and additional support was provided by Meijer vendors. By 1993, Frederik Meijer and fellow Grand Rapids environmental philanthropist Peter Wege of Steelcase were walking the grounds of the early park, and making plans for the nature trail.

The grand opening, on April 20, 1995, was attended by former President Gerald Ford, Governor John Engler, Senator Carl Levin, and Frederik Meijer. The site was originally known as Frederik Meijer Gardens, Michigan Botanic Garden, and Meijer Sculpture Park.

Frederik and Lena Meijer, of Meijer Inc., were instrumental in supporting the development of the project through the donation of land, financing, and by providing their sculpture collection to the park. The museum was renamed the Frederik Meijer Gardens & Sculpture Park in their honor in 2002. The Gardens provided an outlet for Fred Meijer's growing collection of large-scale sculpture from Marshall Fredericks and for Lena Meijer's love of plants and flowers. Three areas of the park reflect the interests of Lena Meijer: a tropical conservancy and a children's garden (each named in her honor), and a replica of the family farm on which she was raised in Amble, Michigan. The mission of Meijer Gardens is to support horticulture and sculpture in order to encourage appreciation of the natural environment and fine art.

In 2017 the organization began significant renovations and additions of new spaces. The expansion was designed by Tod Williams Billie Tsien Architects. The expansion featured a new Welcome Center and more exhibition spaces, allowing for larger and more diverse art installations. The expansion opened in January 2021.

In 2025, Meijer Gardens welcomed their 16 millionth visitor.

== Horticulture ==
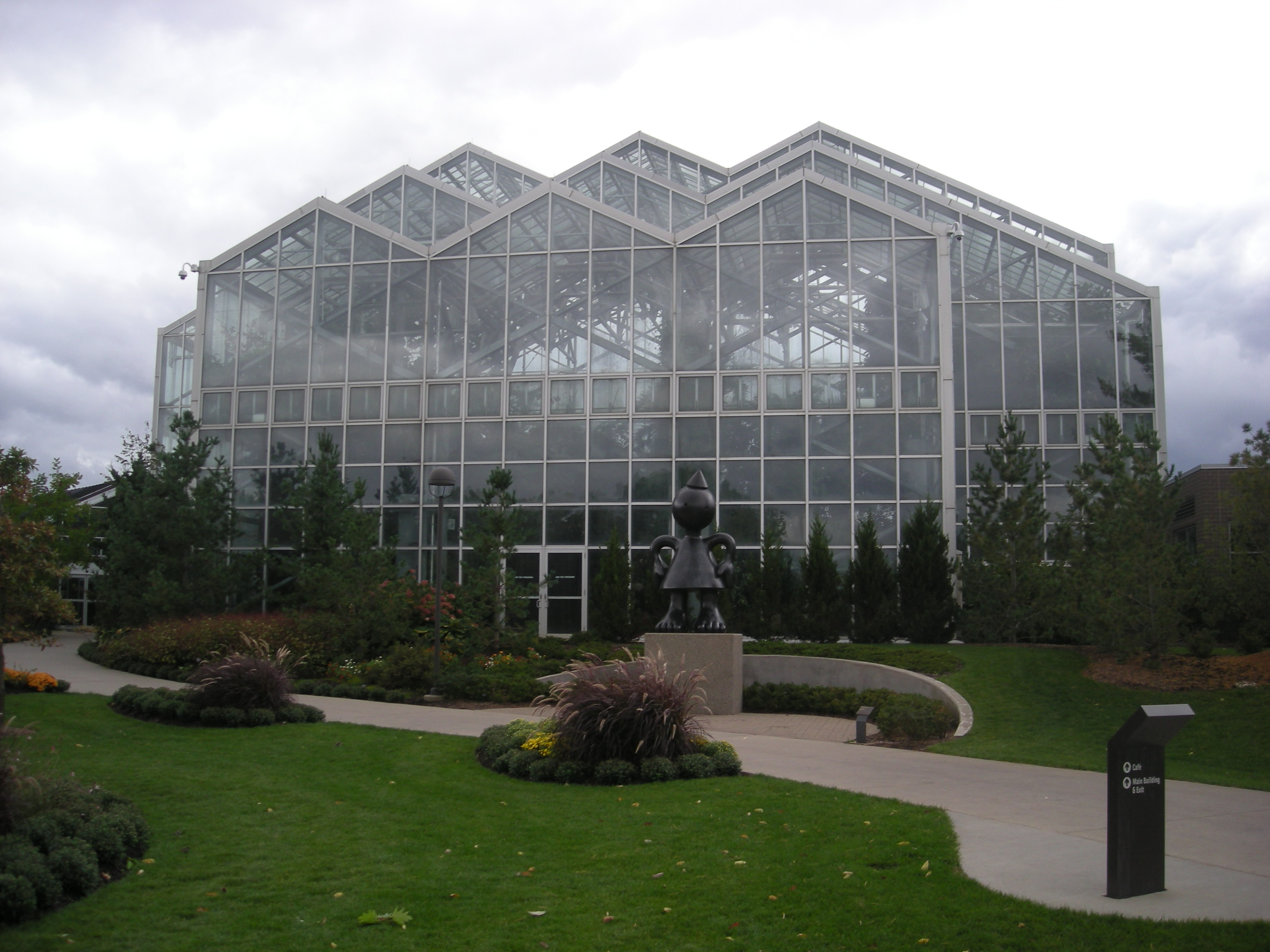
Lena Meijer Conservatory

=== Conservatory ===
The Lena Meijer Tropical Conservatory, a five-story, 15,000-square-foot (1,400 m^{2}) facility, supports tropical plants from around the world. The conservatory houses diverse tropical plants, including coconut palms from the Pacific, fig trees from India, exotic orchids from Central and South America, and Asiatic bamboo and banana trees. Additional indoor gardens include a carnivorous plant house, an arid house for cacti and desert vegetation, and an area with a Victorian theme.

At the time of its opening in 1995, it was considered the largest conservatory in Michigan. Sophisticated software controlled the environment by continuously analyzing the indoor and outdoor conditions and adjusting airflow, ventilation, and temperature. The conservatory's design was a collaboration between Cox-Mendendorp-Olson architects of Grand Rapids, garden designer Stephen Rosselet, and California artist Philip diGiacomo, who designed and fabricated the rocks and water features.

=== Children's Garden ===
Opened in June 2004, the Lena Meijer Children's Garden was also inspired by and named for Lena Meijer. As with much of the larger park, this garden contains a number of sculptures. Included among the areas designed for children within the Lena Meijer Children's Garden are a log cabin, a labyrinth, and a rock quarry where kids can dig for buried fossils.

=== Woodland Shade Garden ===
The Gwen Frostic Woodland Shade Garden, dedicated in June 1998, commemorates the influence of Gwen Frostic, a life-long Michigan resident, artist, author and businesswoman known for her naturalistic block prints of local flora and fauna. The garden features woodland plants including ferns, hostas, bleeding hearts, rhododendrons, and azaleas.

=== Japanese Garden ===
Opened on June 10, 2015, the 8-acre Richard and Helen DeVos Japanese Garden supports horticulture and sculpture. Designed by Hoichi Kurisu, president and founder of Kurisu International, Inc., the garden includes a variety of horticultural elements, including zen-style and bonsai gardens, scenic bridges, waterfalls, and a tea house. Kurisu's garden contains several contemporary sculptures by major international artists selected especially for the location. The Japanese Garden includes a ten-foot work in granite by contemporary artist Anish Kapoor.

=== Nature Trail ===
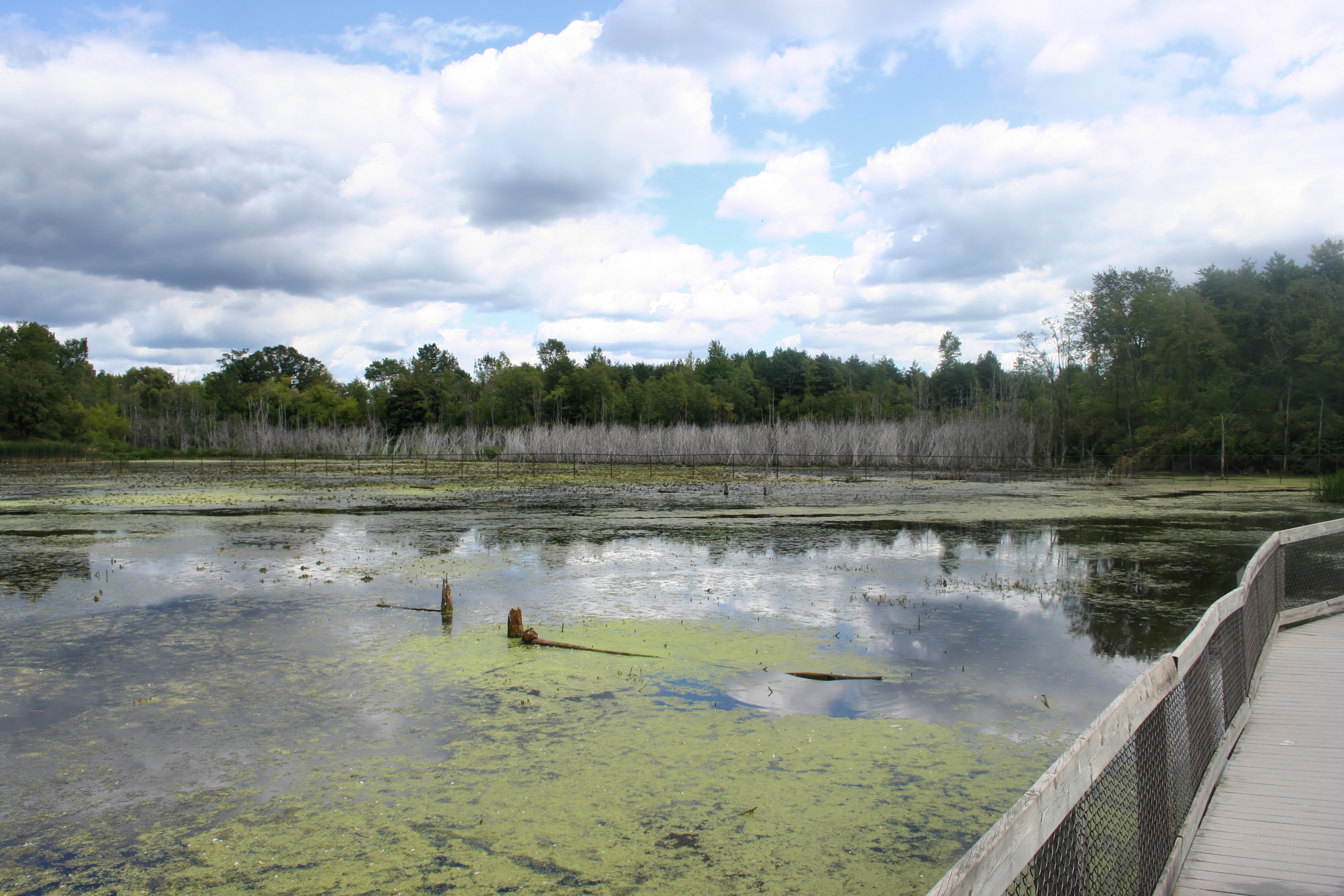
The Wege Nature Trail branches off from the garden area into a preserve of native Michigan trees and wetlands.

The Wege Nature Trail, named for Peter M. Wege, is a paved path that winds through a forested section of the property. The trail presents various native ecosystems of West Michigan and provides sites for bird watching along areas of natural prairie and wetlands. It is connected to the Frey Boardwalk.

The Peter M. Wege Library, which holds reference books and periodicals on horticulture and sculpture, is also named for Peter Wege.

=== Other features ===
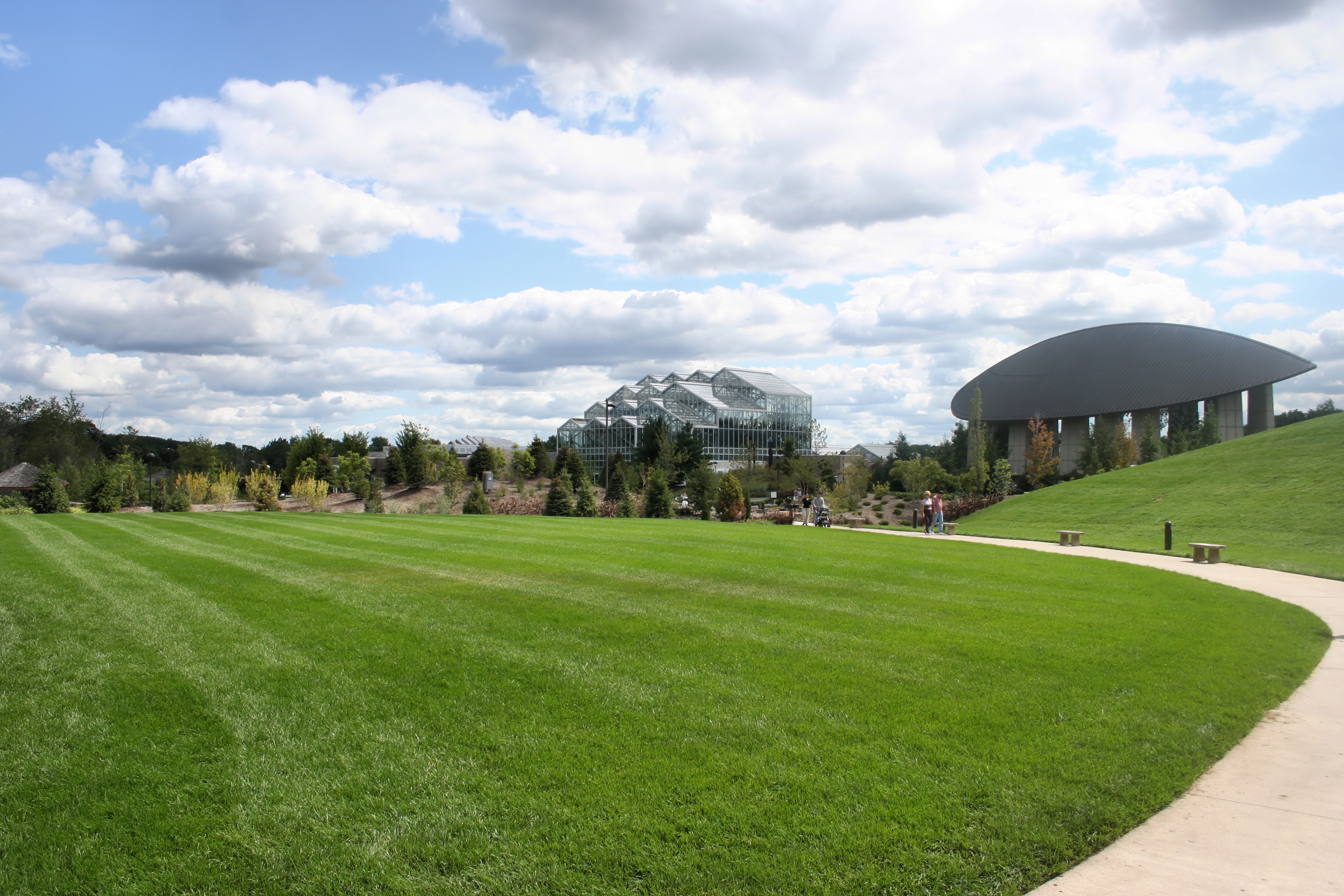
Amphitheater and landscape.

The outdoor gardens include a New American Garden by influential landscape designer James van Sweden, known for his painterly approach to garden and landscape design, and an English Perennial & Bulb Garden from designer Penelope Hobhouse, an award-winning garden designer, lecturer and author. The English Perennial Garden was redesigned by award-winning designer Julie Moir Messervy Design Studio of Vermont.

In 2003, two additional aspects of the garden were completed and opened to the public. The Michigan Farm Garden, with heirloom vegetables, orchards, and figurative animal sculptures, provides families with the opportunity to experience the context of a 1930s farm complete with a 100-year-old barn and replica farmhouse from Lena (Rader) Meijer's childhood, and the Frederik Meijer Gardens Amphitheater, an outdoor musical and theatrical venue with a covered stage and tiered lawn seating for 1,900 persons. Past musicians featured in the Amphitheater include Harry Connick Jr., B.B. King, Sheryl Crow, the Steve Miller Band, and Wynton Marsalis.

== Sculpture ==
Leonardo da Vinci's Horse: The American Horse by Nina Akamu. Bronze, 24 feet (7.3 m)l in height

Meijer Gardens includes a 30-acre (12 ha) outdoor sculptural park, which opened on May 16, 2002.

The museum has exhibited the work of world-renowned artists including Jonathan Borofsky, Alexander Calder, Tony Smith, Anthony Caro, Antony Gormley, Mark di Suvero, Anish Kapoor, Jenny Holzer, Richard Hunt, Joan Miró, David Nash, Arnaldo Pomodoro, Keith Haring, Laura Ford, and Kenneth Snelson among others.

=== Permanent collection ===
Frederik Meijer Gardens & Sculpture Park primarily collects the work of sculptors. It also contains drawings, provided they were created by artists who identify as sculptors. As of May 2015, the permanent collection contained over 300 artworks. It features works by prominent British and American sculptors including Claes Oldenburg, Louise Bourgeois, Richard Serra, Barbara Hepworth, and Henry Moore, in addition to major works by the international artists Coosje van Bruggen, Ai Weiwei, Beverly Pepper, and Jaume Plensa.

Fred and Lena Meijer purchased another large work by glass artist Dale Chihuly in 2009 as an addition to the permanent collection.

In 2016, the museum acquired the archives of sculptor Beverly Pepper, over 900 works on paper. Following the museum's acquisition of Iron Tree by Ai Weiwei, a major exhibition of his work was held at the Gardens in 2017.

The collection contains numerous outdoor monumental sculptures throughout the property and also indoors in the conservatory, specialty gardens, and gallery. Among the many highlights for visitors is The American Horse, sculpted by Nina Akamu as a homage to the original commission to Leonardo da Vinci of the Duke of Milan, as well as works by Auguste Rodin and Degas in the Victorian Conservatory.

=== Temporary exhibitions ===
The Sculpture Program of the Gardens features temporary exhibitions. Featured exhibitions have included works by Andy Goldsworthy, Tom Otterness, Magdalena Abakanowicz, Yinka Shonibare, Jim Dine, and George Rickey.

== Seasonal events ==
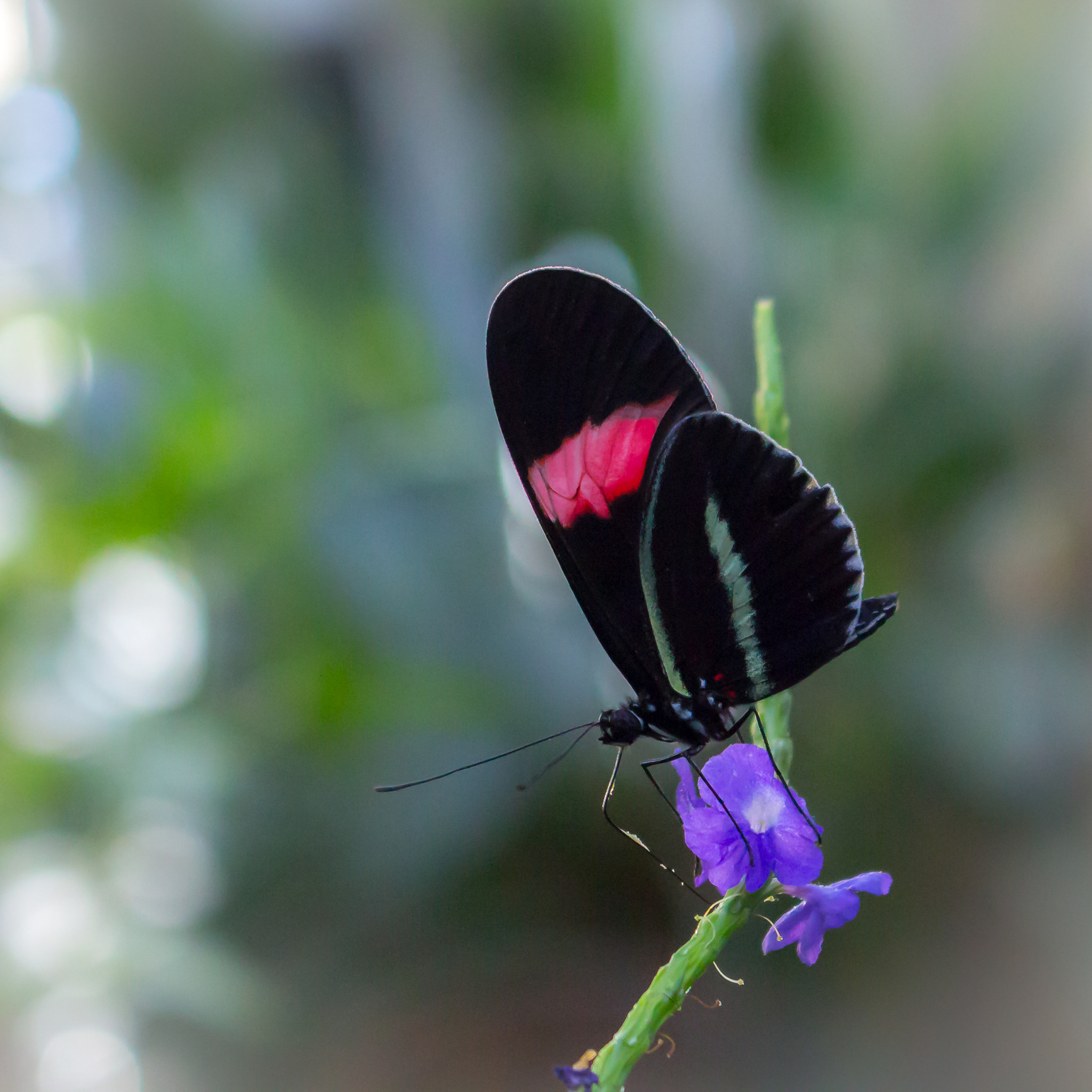
Butterflies are Blooming, 2018

Meijer Gardens supports two large seasonal exhibition events, both started in 1995 when the facility first opened: The Fred & Dorothy Fichter Butterflies Are Blooming, and the Christmas and Holiday Traditions.

Fred & Dorothy Fichter Butterflies Are Blooming is held annually in the Lena Meijer Conservatory from March 1 through April 30; it is one of the largest temporary butterfly exhibits in the nation, with thousands of tropical butterflies from Central America, South America, and Asia. The butterfly exhibit is well attended and popular with visitors of all ages.

Christmas and Holiday Traditions takes place from November through the first week of January. The Gardens' annual event includes the display of holiday items and symbols of more than 40 nations and cultures. In 2024, the winter event expanded outdoors with ENLIGHTEN, an immersive light and sound experience that includes a mile-long walking tour through the sculpture park.

== Gallery ==
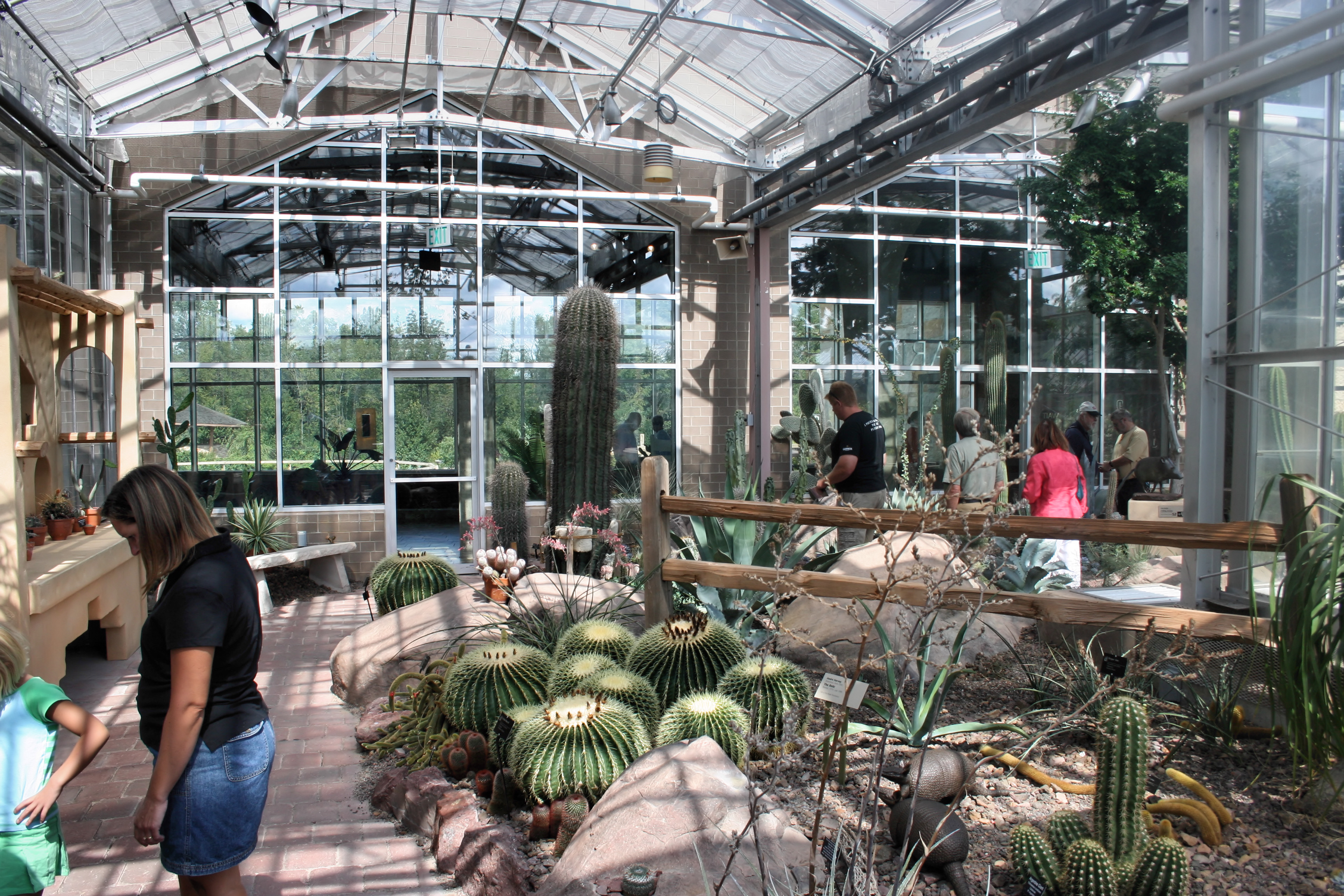
Arid room cacti 2006

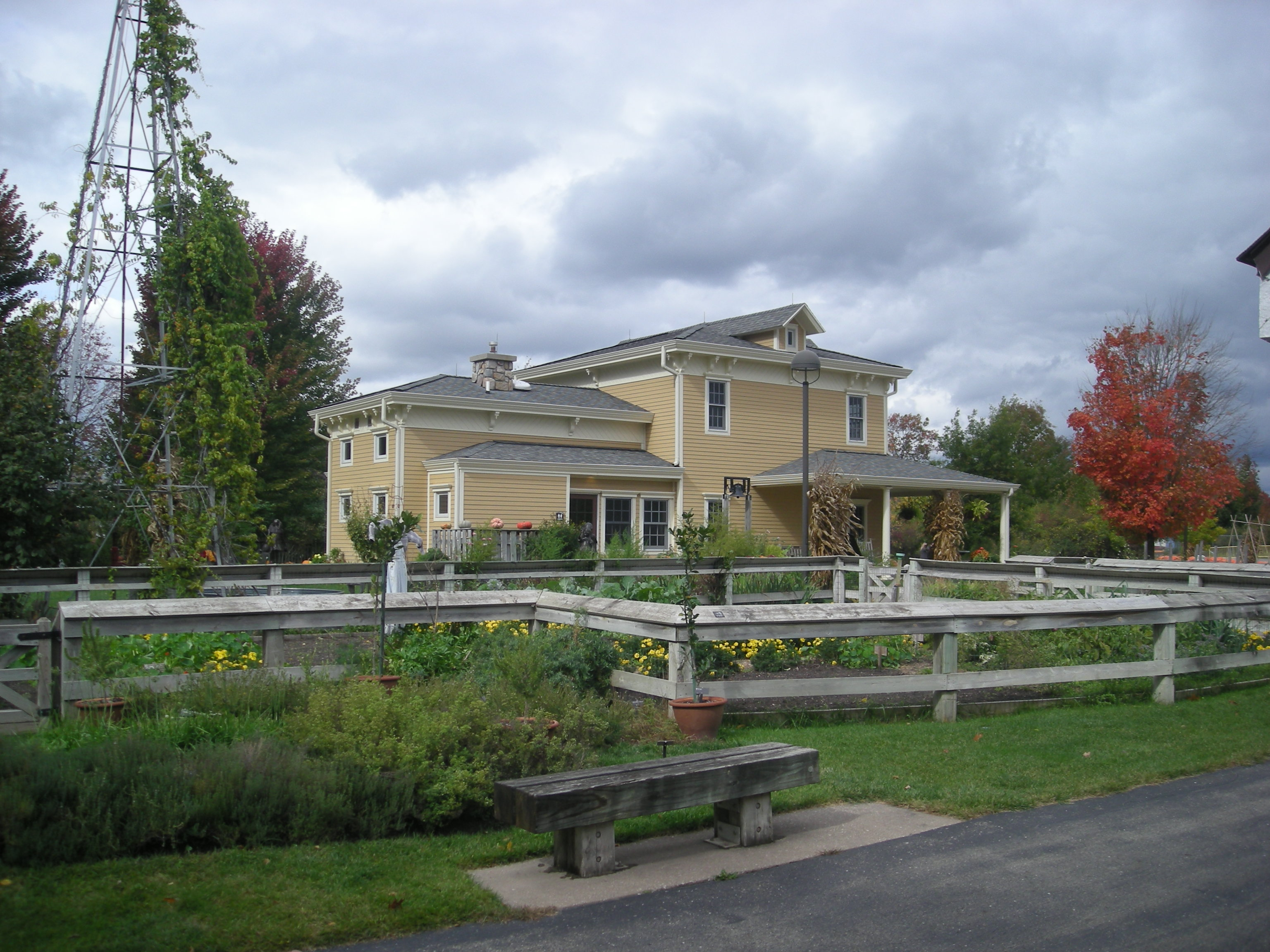
Michigan's Farm Garden

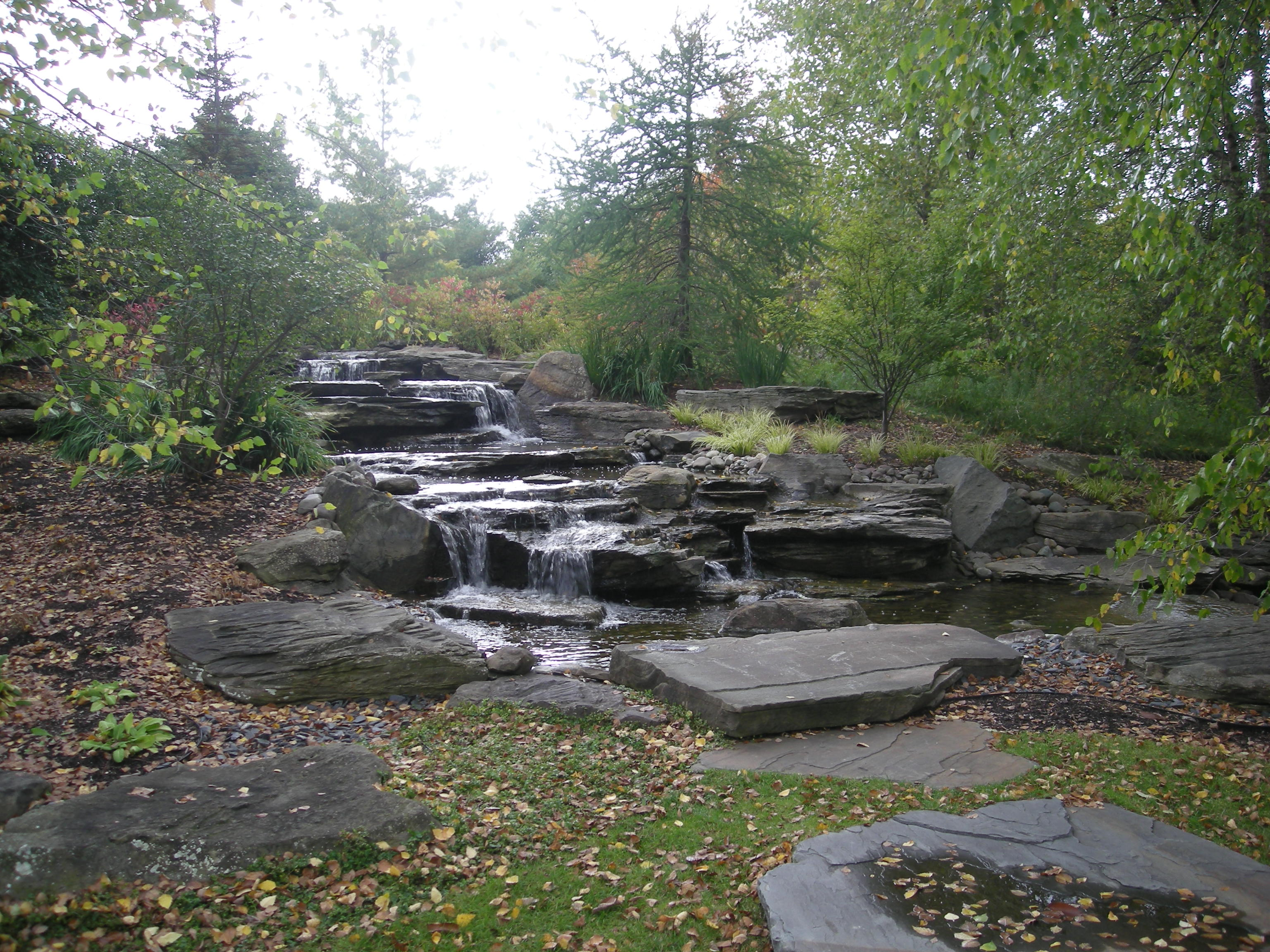
Meijer Gardens, 2014

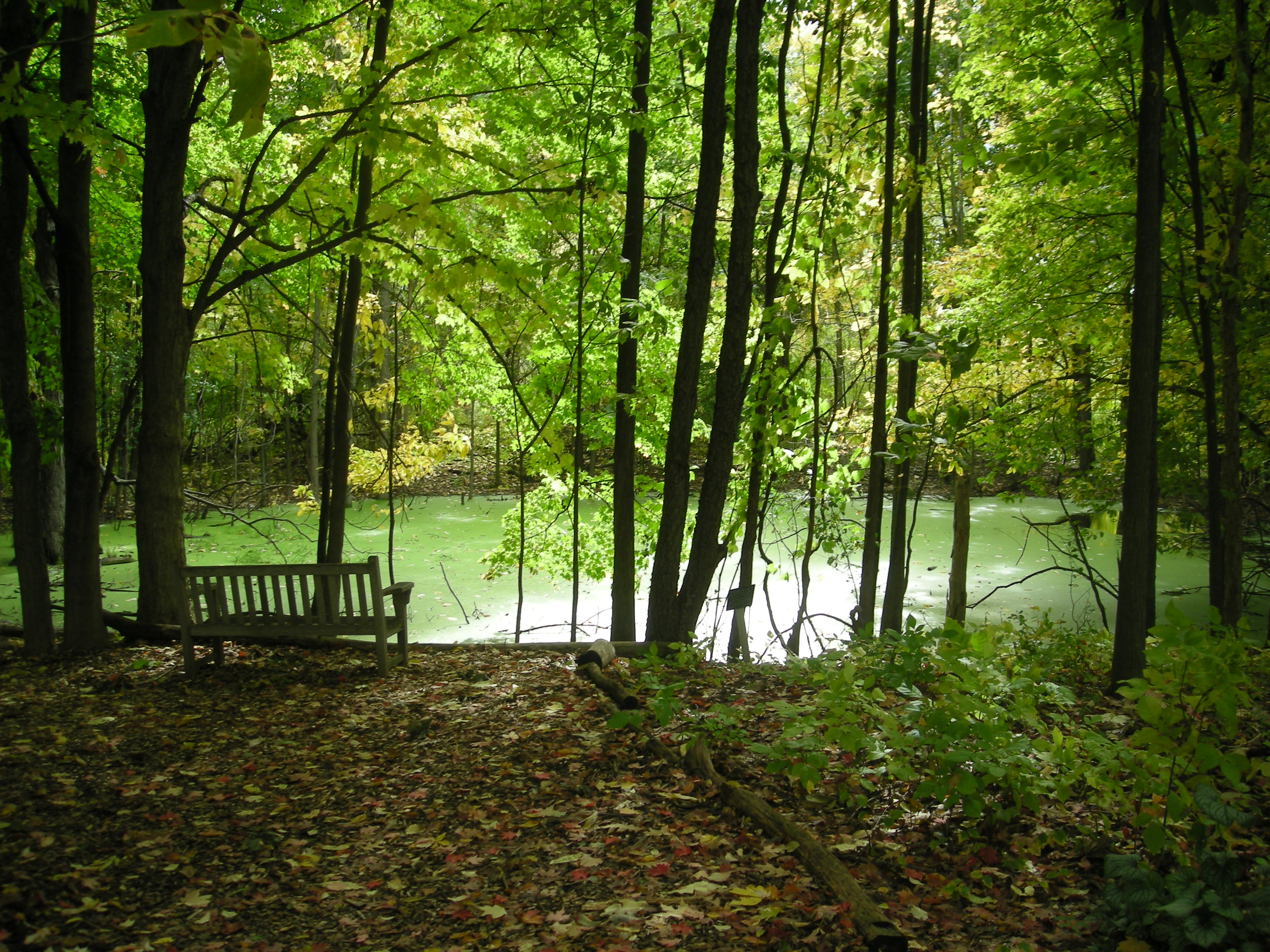
Gwen Frostic Woodland Shade Garden

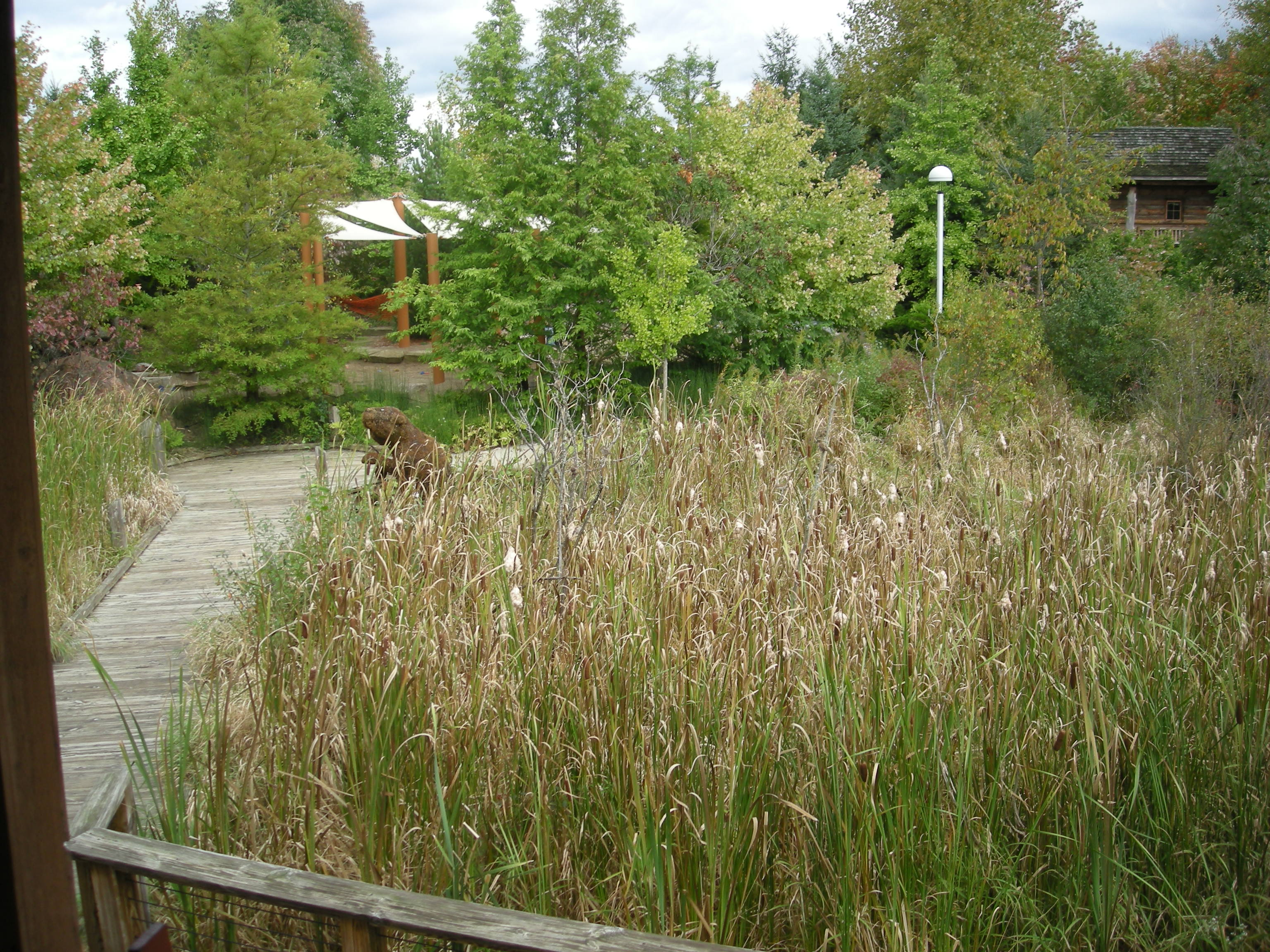
Boardwalk and wetlands

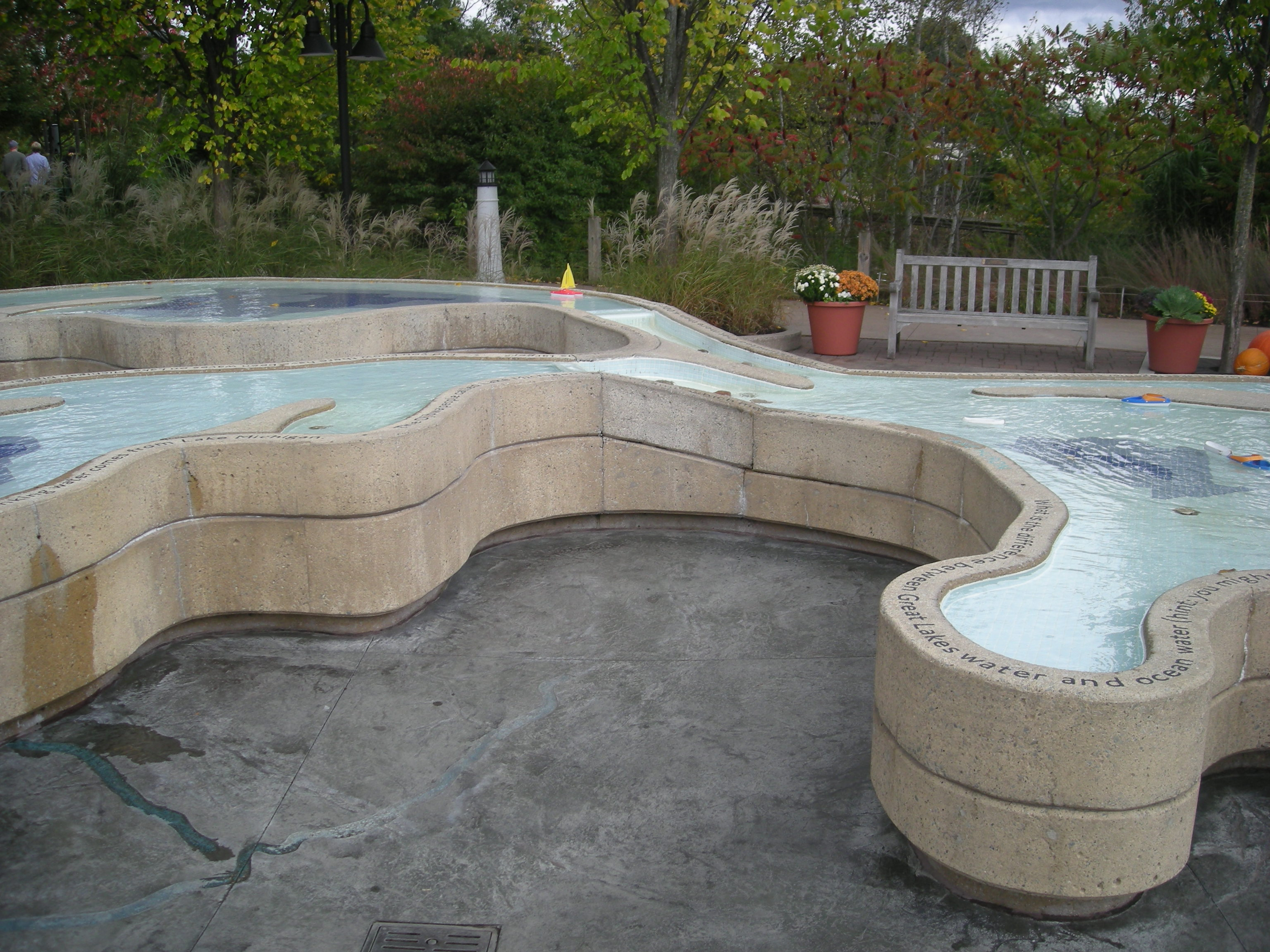
Children's Garden

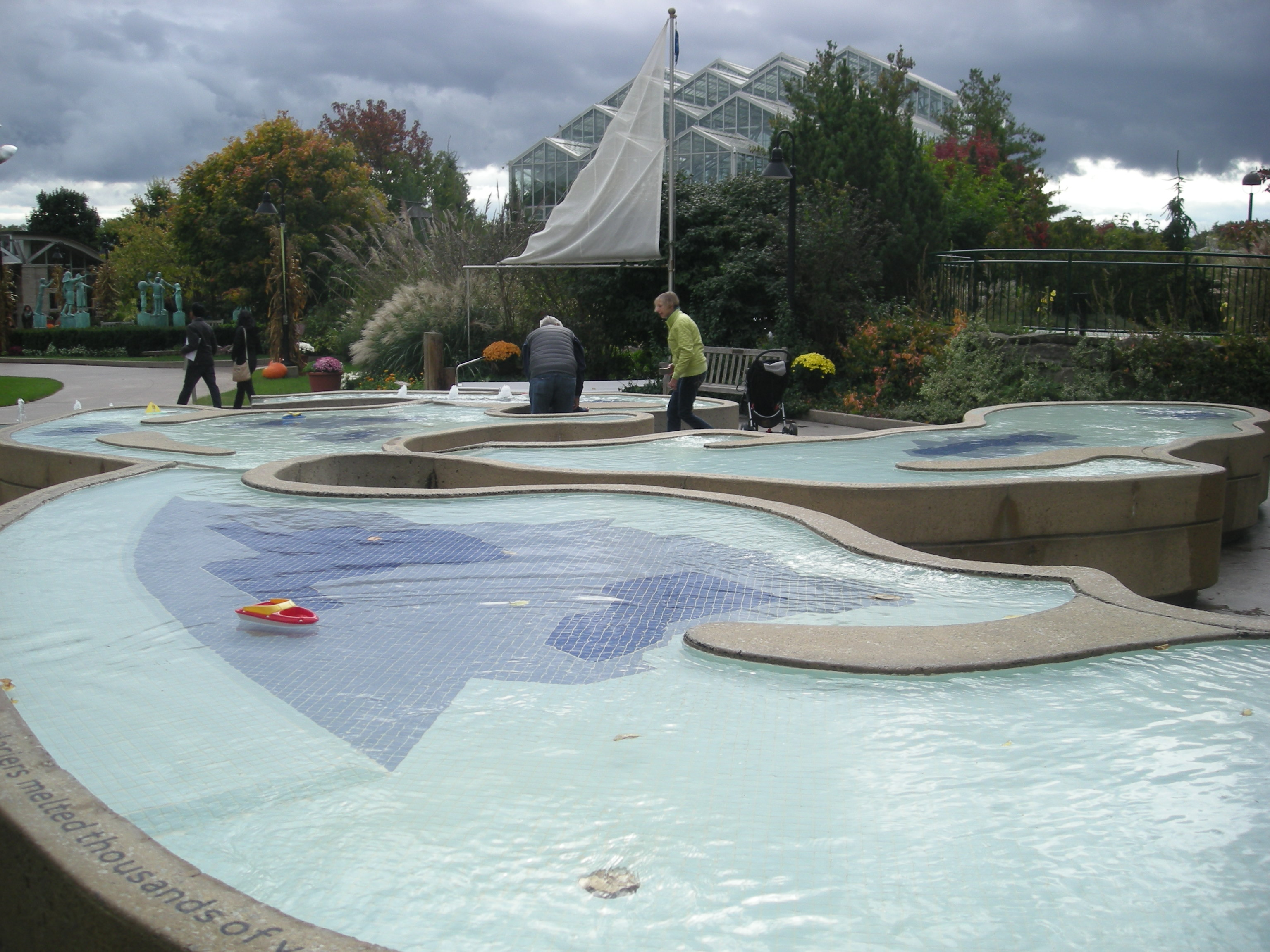
Children's Garden

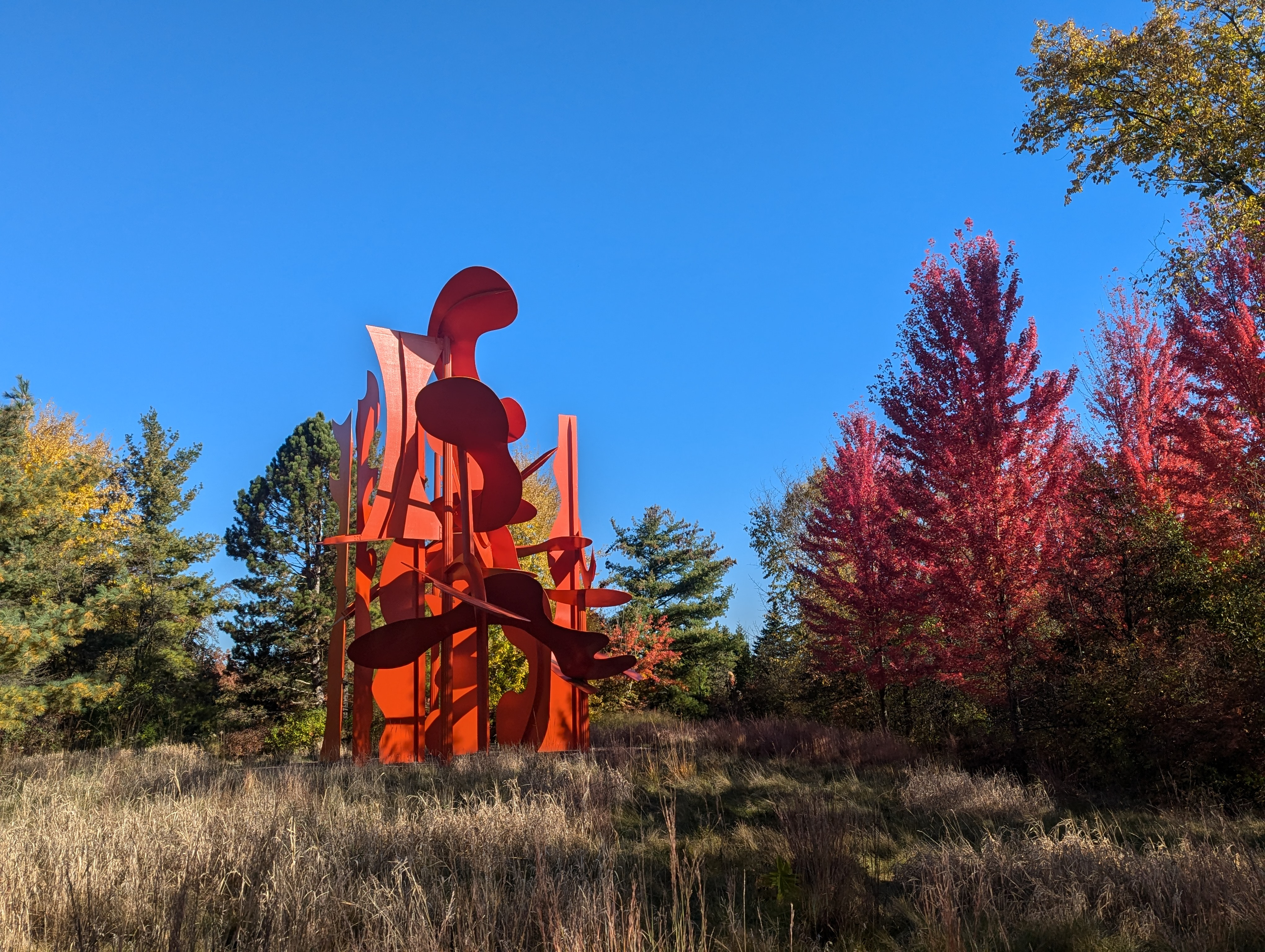
Sculpture park in autumn

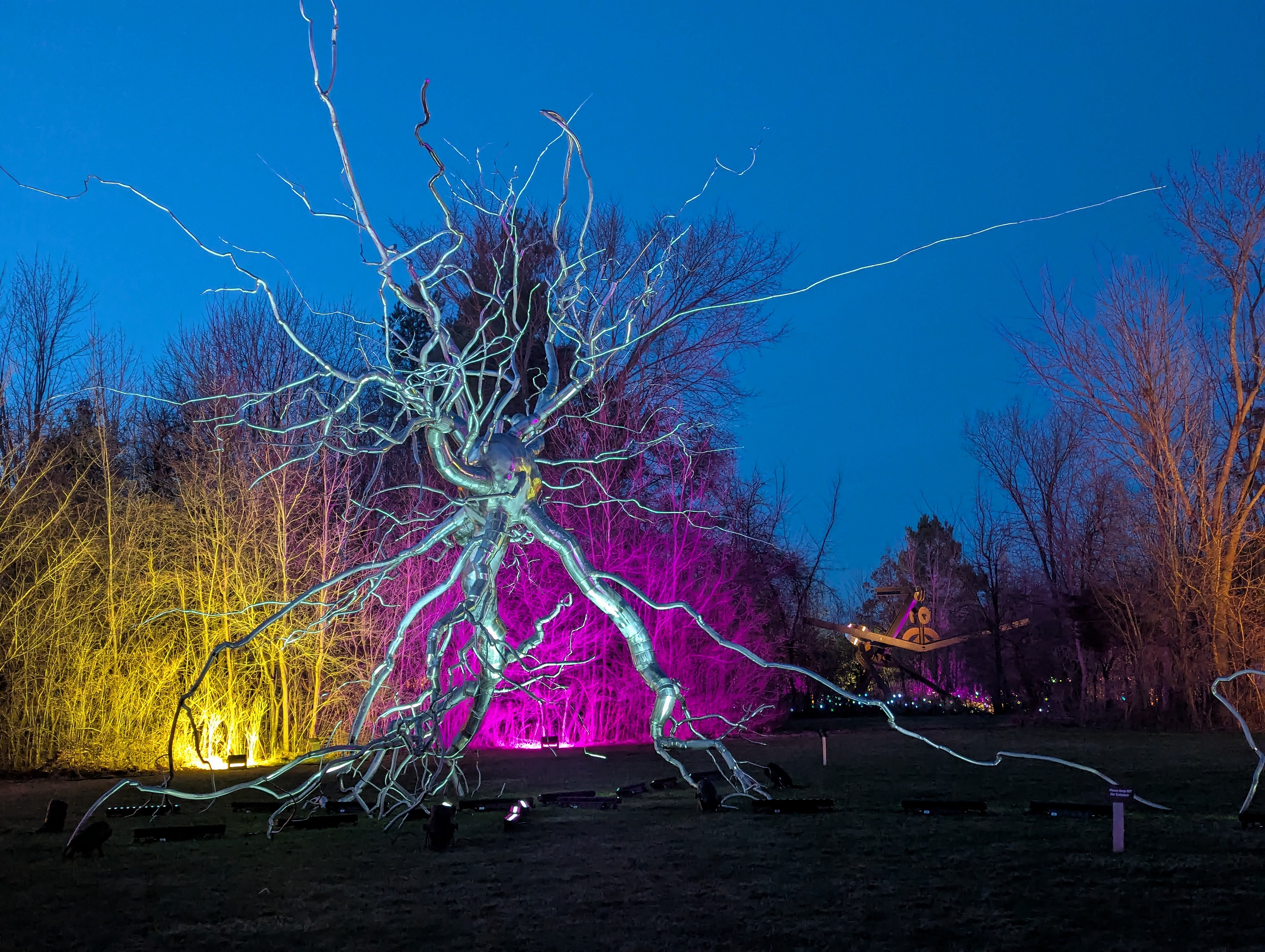
Sculpture park during ENLIGHTEN

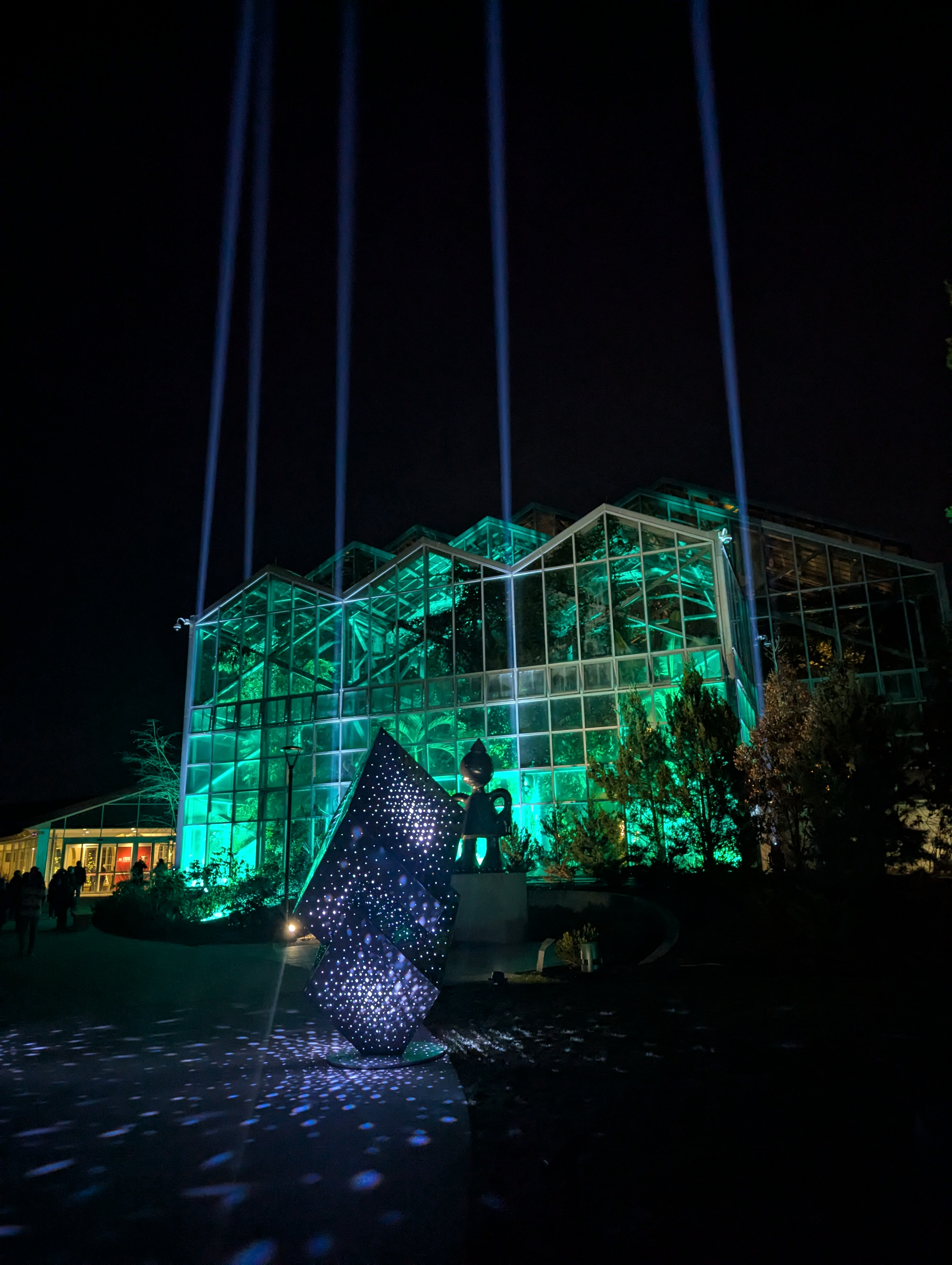
Conservatory during ENLIGHTEN

== Management ==
David Hooker was the President & CEO at Meijer Gardens from 2006 to 2022. Charles Burke was appointed as Hooker's successor, starting in 2023.

In 2022, Meijer Gardens announced the hire of Suzanne Ramljak as Chief Curator.

== Architecture ==
The Lena Meijer Conservatory was designed by Cox, Medendorp and Olson, and utilizes galvanized steel for the frame construction.

In May 2019, the New York partners Tod Williams Billie Tsien Architects were selected to re-envision and expand the facilities at Meijer Gardens, with the assistance of local partners Progressive AE and Owen-Ames-Kimball Co. The expanded and updated 69,000 square foot welcome center, designed by Tod Williams Billie Tsien Architects, displays a large relief sculpture by Spanish artist Jaume Plensa carved from four white marble slabs, each at 19 feet in height.

== See also ==
- List of botanical gardens in the United States
- List of most-visited art museums
