= Expo 2025 =

Exhibition held in Osaka, Japan

2025 Osaka
- Logo

Overview
- BIE-class: Universal exposition
- Category: International Registered Exhibition
- Name: EXPO 2025
- Motto: Designing Future Society for Our Lives
- Area: 155 hectares (383 acres)
- Visitors: 29,017,924 (paid attendance 25,578,986)
- Organized by: Hiroyuki Ishige (secretary general)
- Mascot: Myaku-Myaku

Location
- Country: Japan
- City: Osaka
- Venue: Yumeshima, Konohana-ku
- Coordinates: 34°39′12.7″N 135°23′11.1″E

Timeline
- Bidding: 22 April 2017
- Awarded: 23 November 2018
- Opening: 13 April 2025
- Closure: 13 October 2025

Universal expositions
- Previous: Expo 2020 in Dubai
- Next: Expo 2030 in Riyadh

Specialized expositions
- Previous: Expo 2017 in Astana
- Next: Expo 2027 in Belgrade

Horticultural expositions
- Previous: Expo 2023 in Doha
- Next: Expo 2027 in Yokohama

Internet
- Website: www.expo2025.or.jp/en

Expo 2025 (2025年日本国際博覧会, Nisennijūgo-nen Nippon Kokusai Hakurankai; and officially 大阪・関西万博, Ōsaka–Kansai Banpaku for short) was a World Expo organized and sanctioned by the Bureau International des Expositions (BIE), which was held in Osaka, Japan. It was open for six months, from 13 April to 13 October 2025. This was the second time that Osaka Prefecture has hosted a World Expo, having previously hosted Expo 1970 in Suita. Expo 2025 marked the return to the traditional 5-year scheduling cycle after the 2020 edition in Dubai was delayed to 2021 due to the COVID-19 pandemic. The total visitor count was 29,017,924 (paid attendance 25,578,986).

== Bidding, selection and ratification of Expo city ==
=== Ratification ===
The registration dossier for Japan's expo containing a detailed plan with proposed operational dates (13 April to 13 October 2025) and legacy plans was submitted to the BIE for review.

=== Candidates ===
On 22 November 2016, France submitted to the BIE its candidacy to host World Expo 2025. This first submission launched the bidding process for this Expo by opening the candidate list. All other countries wishing to organize World Expo 2025 had until 22 May 2017 to submit their own bids, after which the project examination phase started.

- Baku, Azerbaijan – The Azerbaijani capital entered its candidacy before the deadline under the theme "Developing Human Capital, Building a Better Future".
- Osaka, Japan – Osaka made its official bid for the Expo on 24 April 2017 with the theme "Designing Future Society for Our Lives".
- Yekaterinburg, Russia – The Russian city entered its candidacy on 22 May 2017 under the theme "Changing the World: Innovations and Better Life for Future Generations".

=== Withdrawn candidates ===
- Paris, France – France, which had been the first to declare its candidacy under the theme "Sharing our Knowledge, Caring for our Planet," withdrew its candidacy on 21 January 2018 due to financial concerns and the successful bid for the 2024 Summer Olympics.

=== Results ===
A secret ballot took place to select the winner at BIE's 164th General Assembly on 23 November 2018. The first ballot awarded 85 votes to Osaka, 48 votes to Yekaterinburg and 23 votes to Baku, which meant that Baku was eliminated. The second round ballot resulted in 92 votes for Osaka and 61 for Yekaterinburg. This makes Expo 2025 the second time that Osaka has hosted a world expo, after Expo '70.

Expo 2025 bidding results
City	Nation	Round 1	Round 2
Osaka	Japan	85	92
Yekaterinburg	Russia	48	61
Baku	Azerbaijan	23	-

== Themes ==
The theme for the expo was "Designing Future Society for Our Lives", with sub-themes of "Saving Lives", "Empowering Lives" and "Connecting Lives". The theme "Saving Lives" included infant vaccinations, sanitation, lifestyle (diet and exercise) and extending lifespans. The concept was "People's Living Lab".

== Purpose ==
The Expo 2025 was held with the aim of achieving a society in which the United Nations' Sustainable Development Goals (SDGs)—17 sustainable development goals set out at the United Nations Summit on Sustainable Development held at the UN Headquarters, New York City in September 2015—have been achieved.

Furthermore, it aimed to head towards realizing Japan's national strategy: Society 5.0 ("super smart society"), which is a society, after the information society, industrial society, agrarian society, and hunter-gatherer society before it, that brings prosperity to people by making the most of ICT and integrating cyberspace and physical space.

== Site ==
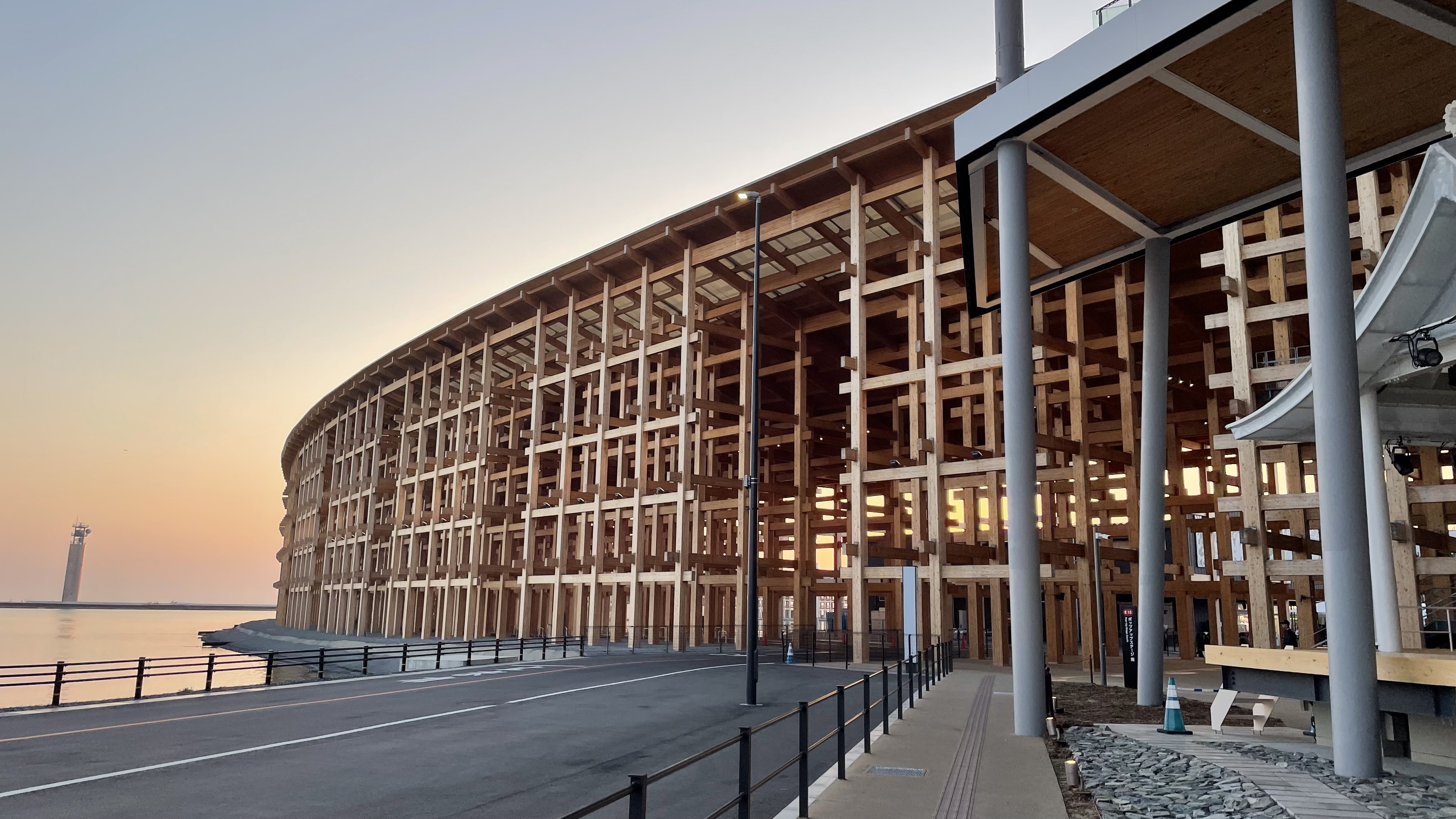
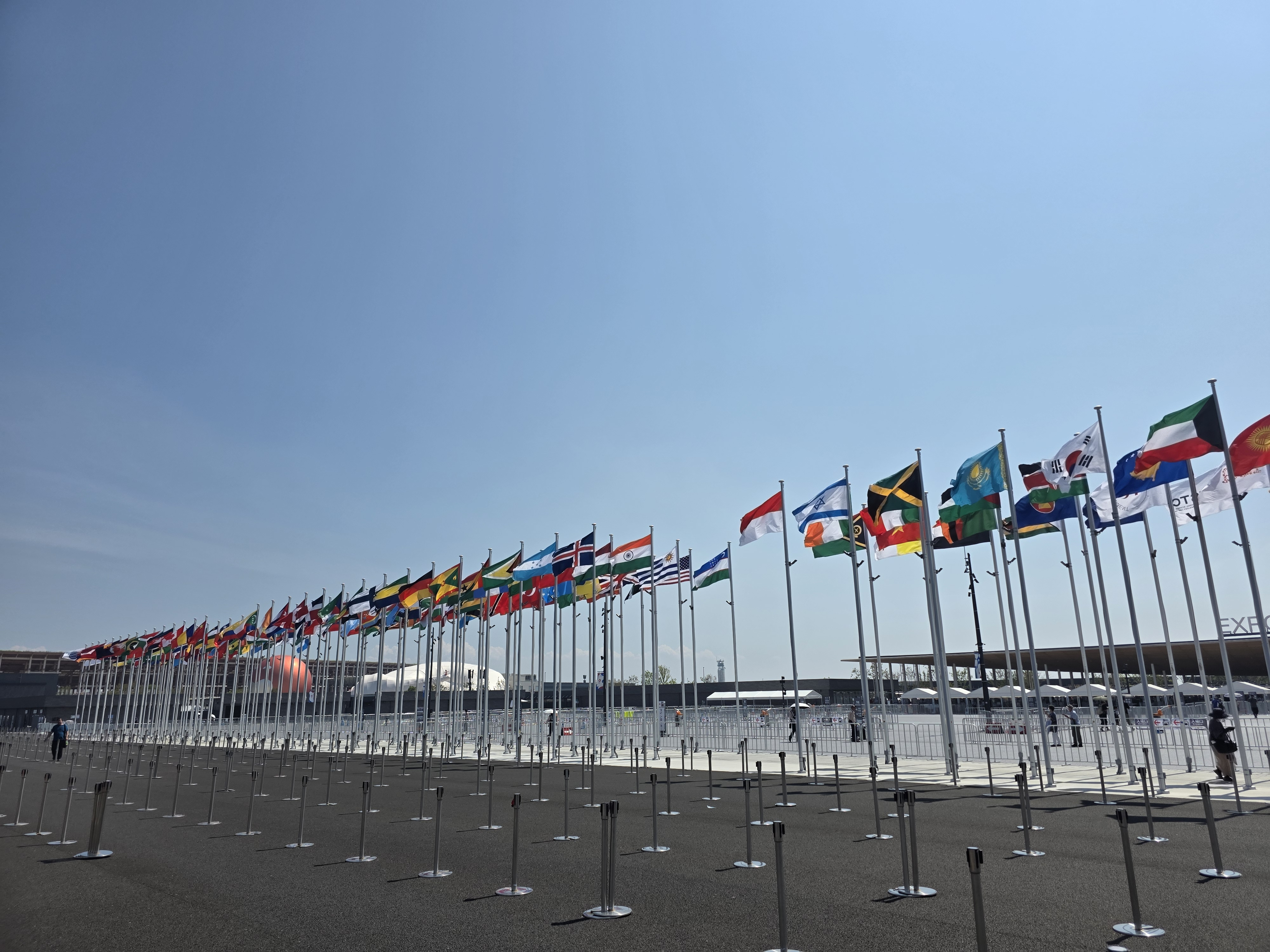
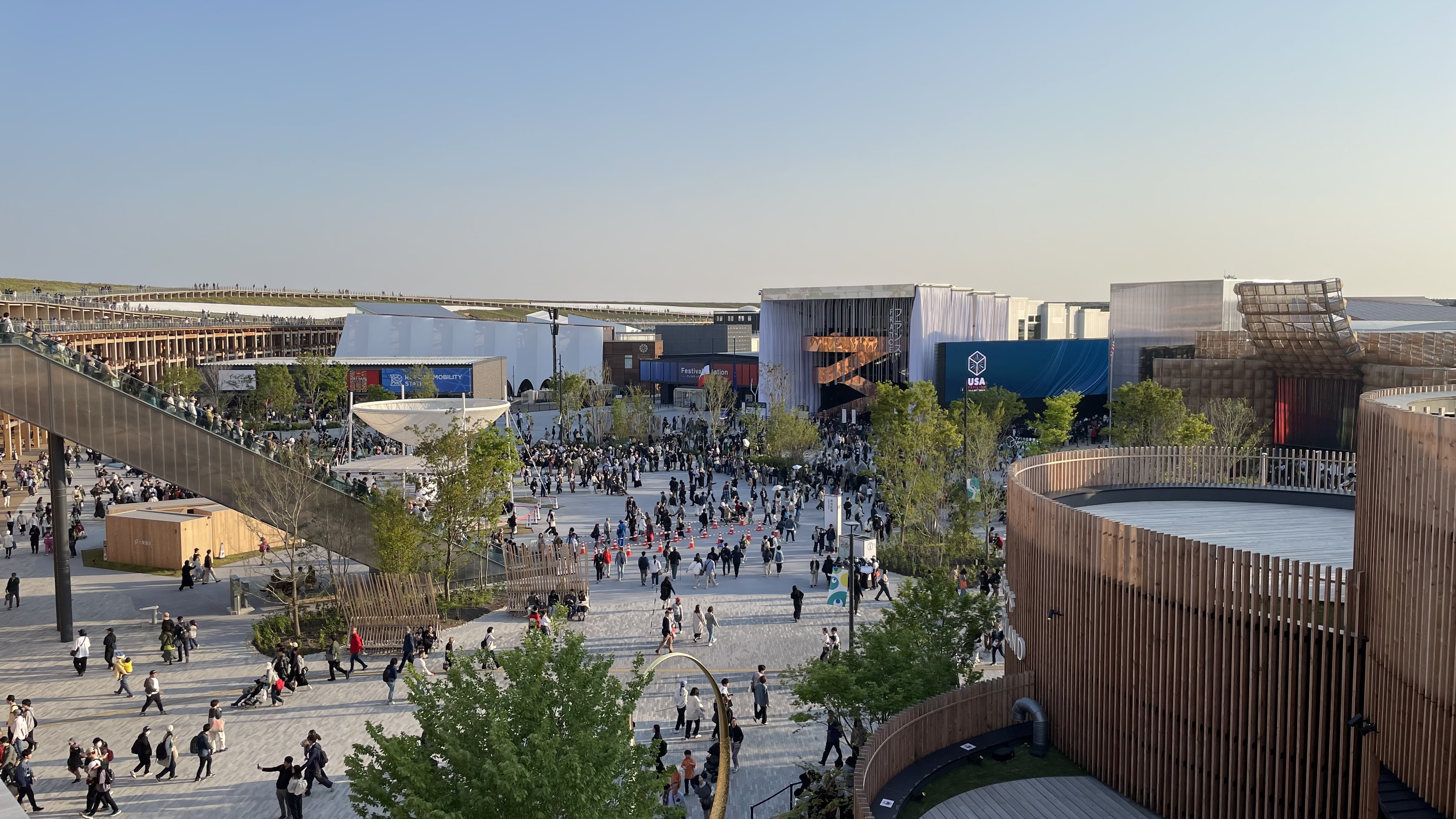
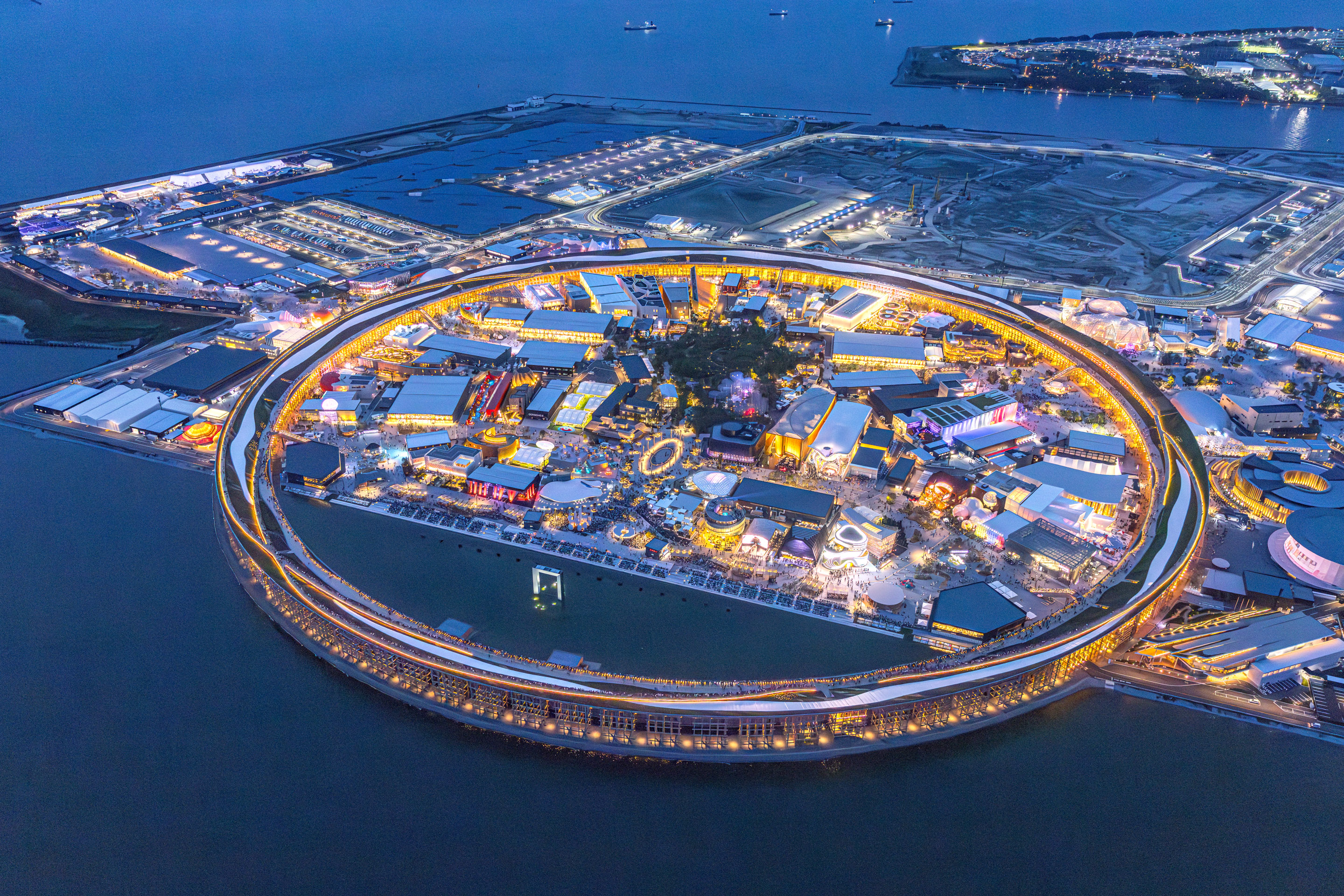
The Grand Ring (southeast), flags in front of the West Gate, and the Eastern Plaza.

The main site of Expo 2025 was a 155 hectare area (383 acres) located in Yumeshima Island, Konohana-ku, Osaka. The Grand Ring was designed by the Japanese Architect Sou Fujimoto. Within the ring were 3 thematic districts dedicated to the sub-themes of Expo 2025 – Connecting, Empowering, and Saving Lives. The infrastructure of the site was built by Obayashi Corporation, Shimizu Corporation, and Takenaka Corporation and was recognized by the Guinness World Records as the world's largest wooden architectural structure with a certified area of 61,035.55 m^{2}.

=== Pavilion World ===
An area where facilities such as the pavilions, the main draw of the Expo, were gathered. Pavilion World had a ring-shaped main street and ring roof. The large roof provided shade and rain protection and also served as an observation corridor by installing an aerial corridor on the roof. In September 2021, the Osaka Wood Association proposed that the ring be constructed with domestic wood. In addition, a "Silent Forest" was placed in the center of the large roof and pavilions as a space for visitors to relax.

=== Water World ===
A relaxation area that utilized the waterscape on the south side of the venue, it was a place that symbolized the world's first maritime Expo. In addition to having food and beverage facilities facing the waterfront, it was used as a stage for water events such as the "Air and Water Spectacular Show". In the evening, from the top of the large roof ring, visitors could watch the sun setting over the Seto Inland Sea, which had been praised as a spectacular sight since ancient times.

=== Green World ===
A green area facing the sea on the west side of the venue, it was an open, green space. It had an outdoor event plaza, a best practice area, and a mobility experience where visitors could try out advanced mobility (such as flying cars). It also had a bus terminal and a western gate.

== Marketing ==
=== Logo ===
The logo mark based on the concept of "cells" was designed by Team Inari (represented by Shimada Tamotsu) in Osaka and Landor Associates from San Francisco, United States. It was announced on 25 August 2020, it became a hot topic on the Internet, called "The Shine of Life".

=== Mascot ===
Myaku-Myaku (ミャクミャク, Myakumyaku), was the mascot and yuru-chara representing Expo 2025, it was designed by picture book and children's book illustrator Kouhei Yamashita and named through a public contest by entrants Miyuu Kawakatsu and Hinata Sakuda in early 2022.

After a strict selection process from 33,197 submissions, it was selected on the morning of 18 July 2022, and announced at a commemorative event held on the same day. That day marked the 1,000-day countdown before the opening. Then-Japan Prime Minister Fumio Kishida explained that the nickname is imbued with the meaning of inheriting history, tradition, culture, and connections with the world.

=== Commemorative coins ===
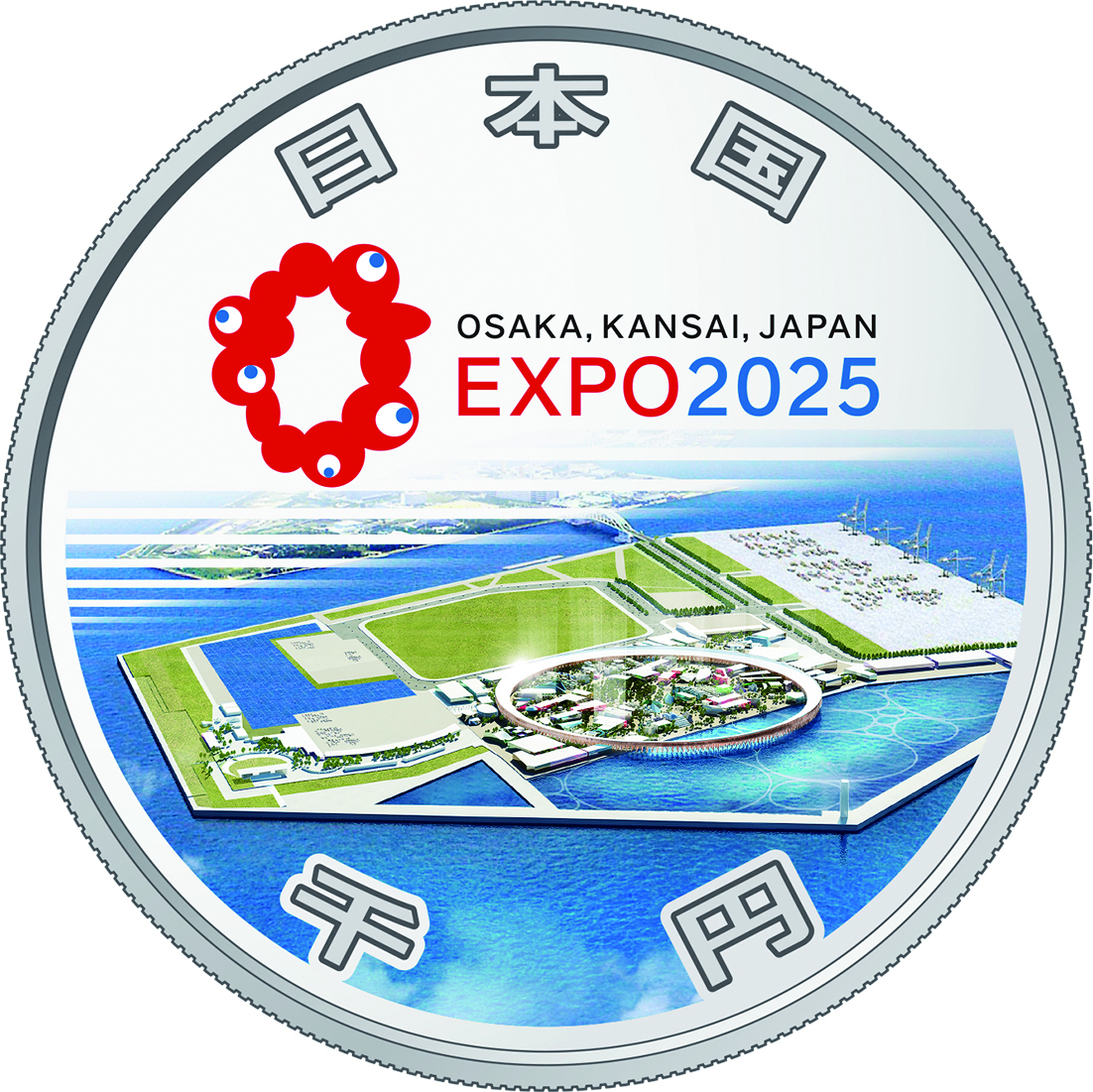
Expo 2025 commemorative coin design

In April 2023, the Japanese Ministry of Finance announced that it would issue coins to commemorate the 2025 World Exposition.

In September 2024, the Ministry of Finance announced that it would issue ¥10,000 gold coins, ¥1,000 silver coins, and ¥500 coins to commemorate the 2025 World Expo (Osaka-Kansai Expo). This would be the first time that the ¥10,000 gold coins and ¥500 coins have been issued as Expo 2025 commemorative coins. The ¥1,000 silver coin would be issued for the third time. The application period would be around three weeks from March 6, 2025, and the coins would be sold by mail order through the Mint Bureau.

== Transport ==
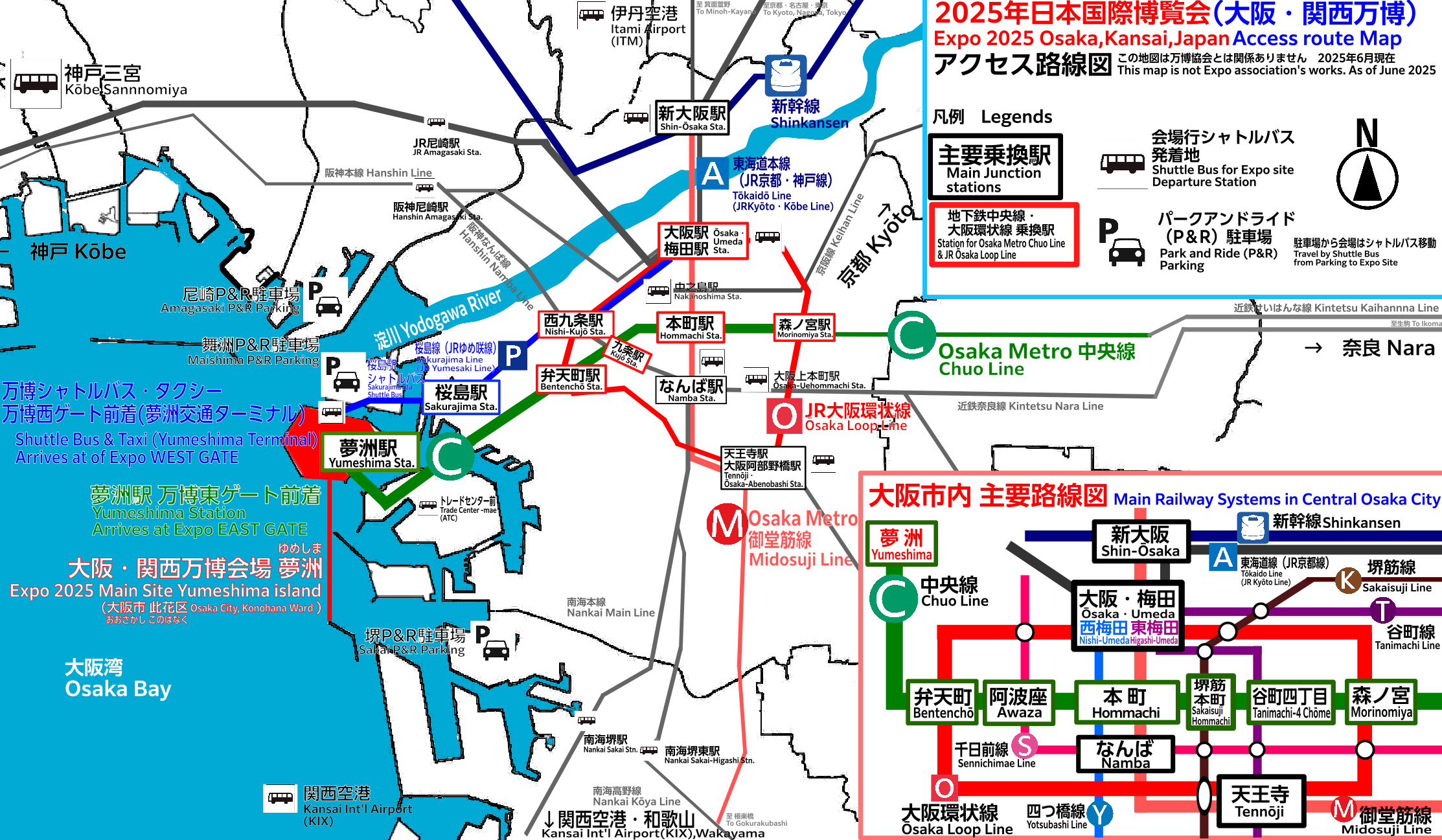
Transportation map to the Expo 2025 (As of June 2025)

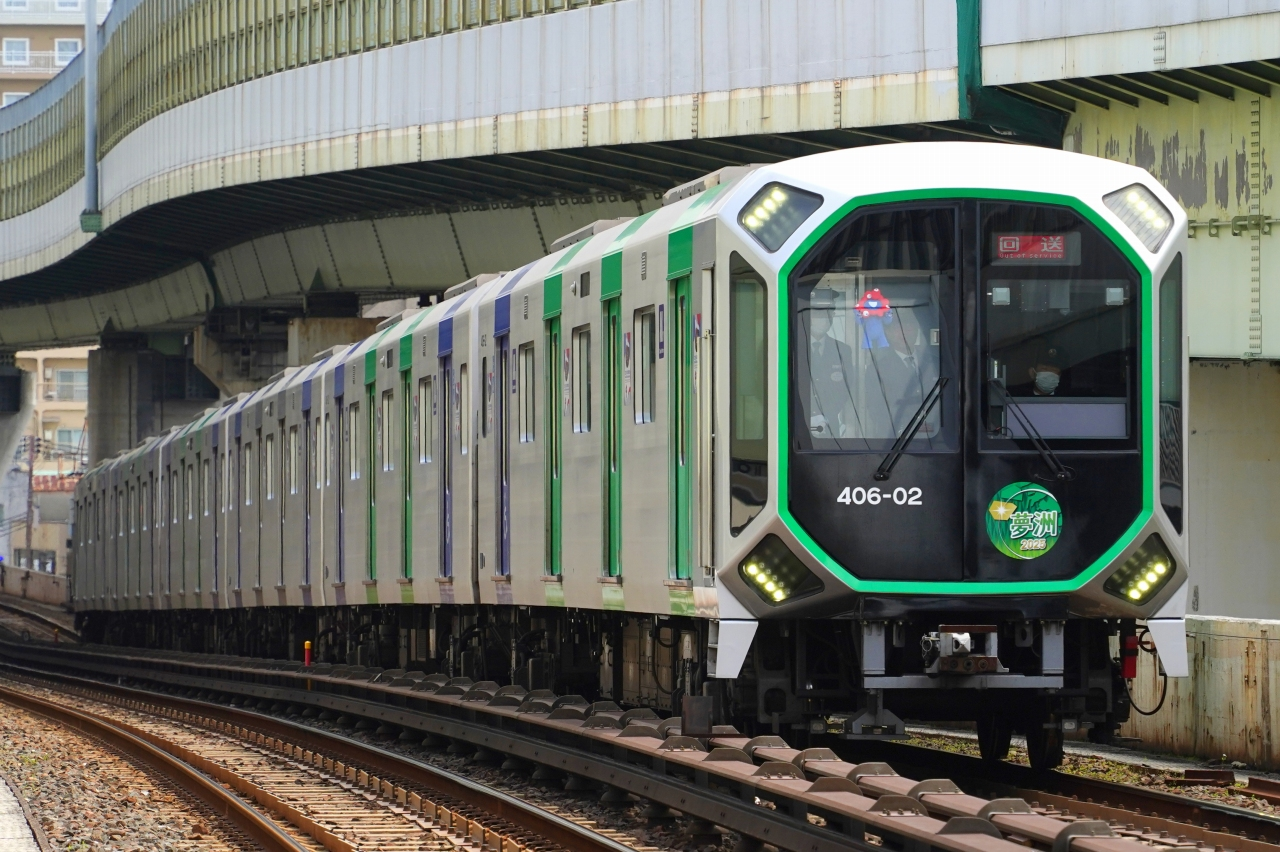

The venue for the Expo 2025 was Yumeshima, an artificial island in Osaka Bay. As this was the first Expo to be held on an island, visitors needed to land on Yumeshima. To get to Yumeshima, visitors needed to use public transport, such as trains, shuttle buses, express buses, airport buses, bicycles, boats, and taxis. As private cars are prohibited from the island in principle, except for those using the handicapped parking lot, visitors needed to park in a nearby P&R (park and ride) parking lot and then take a shuttle bus to the island.

In addition, this Expo, based on the concept of a "testing ground for future society," hosted a "Future Society Showcase Project" where visitors could experience life in the near future. As part of this, the transportation to the venue would also feature futuristic mobility equipped with cutting-edge technology, such as electric buses that could be powered while driving and hydrogen fuel cell ships.

Before the opening, it was estimated that of the maximum 227,000 visitors per day, 133,000 (58.6%) would use Yumeshima Station on the Osaka Metro Chuo Line. According to estimates by the Expo Association, in the first month after the opening, the average number of visitors per day was 104,000, lower than the expected 150,000, but 76.6% of visitors used Yumeshima Station, which does not require reservations. This was mainly due to the fact that the expensive P&R (Park & Ride) was used by only 5.2% of visitors.

A 3.2 km extension of the Osaka Metro Chūō Line was constructed from its former terminus at Cosmosquare Station using the Yumesaki Tunnel to Yumeshima Station, which opened on 19 January 2025.

In addition, there were many shuttle bus routes to the Expo site.

== Opening and closing ceremonies ==
Prior to Expo 2025, around 9.69 million advance tickets were sold. A rehearsal for Expo 2025 was conducted from 4 to 6 April, a week before the opening. About 98,000 people attended, including those from exhibiting companies (who attended on 4 April) and Osaka residents and citizens selected through advance applications and lottery (who attended on 5 and 6 April). A media preview was hosted on 9 April. The dedication ceremony for Expo 2025 took place on 12 April 2025 at the EXPO Hall "Shine Hut" and the EXPO National Day Hall "Ray Garden". The ceremony was attended by Prime Minister Shigeru Ishiba, Emperor Naruhito, Empress Masako, Crown Prince Akishino, and 1,300 representatives of participating nations. The theme of the opening ceremony was "Re-Connect: Circulate, Resonate, Return, Connect". After Naruhito gave an opening address, Akishino, Honorary President of the Expo, performed an "opening action" by placing his hand over the activation panel to open the Expo. Expo 2025 officially opened the following day, 13 April. At the time of the opening, eight foreign nations' pavilions were incomplete.

The closing ceremony was held on 13 October 2025 in the presence of invited guests and theme was "For the Futures". The flag of the Bureau International des Expositions was handed over to Saudi Arabia, the host country of Expo 2030, the next world expo. Crown Prince Akishino and Osaka Governor Hirofumi Yoshimura gave speeches at the closing ceremony. The mascot was removed on October 14, the day after the Expo closed, Miyakumyaku said, "The Expo is over. It was fun meeting people from all over the world," to which then-Prime Minister Shigeru Ishiba replied, "it was fun talking to people from all over the world," enjoying their final conversation. The Prime Minister said, "I think that because of Miyakumyaku, we were able to unite our hearts. Miyakumyaku will continue its activities even after the Expo closes.

Other performances at the end of the closing ceremony included performances by Sho Sakurai, Yumiko Udo, and dance performer Aoitsuki, and a speech of thanks was given by Osaka Governor Hirofumi Yoshimura. Just like in his opening ceremony speech, Governor Yoshimura used the word "thank you" eight times to express his gratitude to the staff and volunteers.

== Performances ==
Several performances at the Expo 2025 have been recognized by Guinness World Records.

- Marching band: A brass band of 12,300 members marched through the large roof ring and was recognized as the "world's largest marching band."
- Magical Dances of Water and Air: A daytime water event in which water sprayed from approximately 300 fountains in response to visitors' gestures was recognized (certified area: approximately 2,100 square meters).
- Drone show: A drone show featuring 1,000 drones was held by Red Cliff for 184 days starting on the opening day, April 13. The large-scale drone show featuring 2,500 drones, a special production on the first day of the event, set a Guinness World Record. Title: Largest aerial display of a tree formed by multirotors/drones.
- Bon Odori and a nightclub-style DJ concert: On the evening of 26 July, the largest Bon Odori dance and a DJ concert was held with over 3,900 people from 62 countries and was recognized based on the number of participants and nationalities.

== Attendance ==
Before the opening, it was estimated that the event would attract 28.2 million visitors (an average of approximately 150,000 per day) over its six-month run, with a peak daily attendance of up to 227,000.

On opening day, 13 April 2025, 146,426 people (including 124,339 general visitors) attended, partly due to a planned Blue Impulse demonstration flight (which was cancelled due to bad weather) and a planned Ado concert. On that day, communication issues occurred at the entrance gate where digital tickets were presented in the morning, and in the afternoon, as the weather worsened, people rushed to Yumeshima Station to get home, resulting in long lines. The number of visitors temporarily decreased after the second day, and for the first month after the opening, general visitor numbers remained in the 40,000-90,000 range, excluding the Golden Week period.

From mid-May onwards, attendance increased due to the expansion of reservation slots and the earlier entry time for night tickets. On May 23, 163,509 people (145,245 general visitors) attended, exceeding the number on the opening day for the first time in 40 days. Also, on May 31, the last day for distributing discount codes for season passes, a record 187,762 people attended, due to a combination of events such as fireworks and live concerts. The number of general visitors (169,923) exceeded 150,000 for the first time. In the second month (four weeks from May 13 to June 7), attendance increased by an average of 37,000 people per day compared to the first month of the opening. Based on the results of the Aichi Expo, it is expected that the number of visitors in the last three months would be 1.5 times that of the first half.

Visitor numbers lagged expectations during Expo 2025's first week. Even though the exposition was expected to attract 28.2 million total visitors (or 150,000 visitors per day), the event had not recorded that number of visitors on any day during its opening week. Expo 2025 recorded its millionth visitor 10 days after the exposition opened, on 23 April.

Expo 2025 welcomed its 10 millionth visitor on 29 June 2025, the 78th day of the Expo. Kazuhiro Asano, a public accountant, received special passes for unlimited entries during the summer period. Blue Impulse performed an air show over the Expo venue on 13 July 2025, which was rescheduled from the opening day due to bad weather.

By September 2025, attendance regularly exceeded 200,000 visitors per day and more than 20.7 million tickets had been sold - surpassing the approximately 18 million tickets required for the event to reach a financial break-even point.

On 13 August, due to an electrical system problem that occurred around 9:28 PM on the Osaka Metro Chūō Line, service was suspended from 9:30 PM for equipment inspection. At the time of the outage, an estimated 49,000 people, including staff, were stranded around the venue, including the plaza in front of the East Gate directly connected to Yumeshima Station. Trains resumed running between Yumeshima Station and Cosmosquare Station at 10:10 PM. At one point, approximately 30,000 people were unable to return home. The Expo Association opened pavilions and other facilities to accommodate them. Approximately 11,000 people, including staff, remained there until the next morning. The Chuo Line resumed full service at 5:25 AM on 14 August, and all visitors had left by 6:55 AM. (as a result, the opening time on the 14th was delayed to 9:30 AM.) During this time, 36 people were rushed to the hospital complaining of headaches and numbness.

== Reception ==
A poll conducted by the Asahi Shimbun in June 2024 found limited interest by Japanese people for Expo 2025. Of 2,859 Asahi Shimbun readers, 81% had no intention of attending the expo, including 62% of respondents in Osaka. High ticket prices, lack of specific information about attractions, and safety concerns were listed as concerns by respondents. Eighty-six per cent of respondents disapproved of using public funds to hold the expo. In February 2025, a Mainichi Shimbun poll found that only 16% of respondents said they wanted to see Expo 2025. The Kansai region, which includes Osaka, had the highest level of interest, at 28%.

The Grand Ring has attracted praise, although the incongruous pavilions and largely unshaded, concrete public areas drew criticism before the expo opened. During the expo, a bomb scare, concerns about methane on the site, long queues, and bad behaviour by some attendees diminished the visitor experience. Visitor numbers in the first month were well below expectations, although one reviewer who attended on 30 April observed that past expos have seen their highest attendance numbers closer to their end dates.

Myaku-Myaku, the official mascot of the expo, initially sparked mixed reactions, before becoming popular. In front of its pavilion, visitors crowd around the character's statue to take pictures with it, or line up to enter Myaku-Myaku House, where a moving Myaku-Myaku welcomes its fans.

== Participants ==
=== Countries ===
- Algeria
- Angola
- Antigua and Barbuda
- Armenia
- Australia
- Austria
- Azerbaijan
- Bahrain
- Bangladesh
- Barbados
- Belgium
- Belize
- Benin
- Bhutan
- Bolivia
- Brazil
- Brunei
- Bulgaria
- Burkina Faso
- Burundi
- Cabo Verde
- Cambodia
- Cameroon
- Canada
- Central African Republic
- Chad
- Chile
- China
- Colombia
- Comoros
- Côte d'Ivoire
- Croatia
- Cuba
- Czech Republic
- DR Congo
- Denmark
- Djibouti
- Dominican Republic
- Egypt
- Equatorial Guinea
- Eswatini
- Ethiopia
- Fiji
- Finland
- France
- Gabon
- Gambia
- Germany
- Ghana
- Grenada
- Guatemala
- Guinea
- Guinea-Bissau
- Guyana
- Haiti
- Honduras
- Hungary
- Iceland
- India
- Indonesia
- Ireland
- Israel
- Italy
- Jamaica
- Japan
- Jordan
- Kazakhstan
- Kenya
- South Korea
- Kosovo
- Kuwait
- Kyrgyzstan
- Laos
- Latvia
- Lesotho
- Liberia
- Lithuania
- Luxembourg
- Madagascar
- Malawi
- Malaysia
- Mali
- Malta
- Marshall Islands
- Mauritania
- Mauritius
- Micronesia
- Moldova
- Monaco
- Mongolia
- Montenegro
- Mozambique
- Nauru
- Nepal
- Netherlands
- Nigeria
- North Macedonia
- Norway
- Oman
- Pakistan
- Palau
- Palestine
- Panama
- Papua New Guinea
- Paraguay
- Peru
- Philippines
- Poland
- Portugal
- Qatar
- Romania
- Rwanda
- Saint Kitts and Nevis
- Saint Lucia
- Saint Vincent and the Grenadines
- Samoa
- San Marino
- São Tomé and Príncipe
- Saudi Arabia
- Senegal
- Serbia
- Seychelles
- Sierra Leone
- Singapore
- Slovakia
- Slovenia
- Solomon Islands
- Somalia
- South Sudan
- Spain
- Sri Lanka
- Sudan
- Suriname
- Sweden
- Switzerland
- Tajikistan
- Tanzania
- Thailand
- Timor-Leste
- Togo
- Tonga
- Trinidad and Tobago
- Tunisia
- Türkiye
- Turkmenistan
- Tuvalu
- Uganda
- Ukraine
- United Arab Emirates
- United Kingdom
- United States
- Uruguay
- Uzbekistan
- Vanuatu
- Vatican
- Vietnam
- Yemen
- Zambia
- Zimbabwe

=== Withdrawn countries (with dates of withdrawal) ===
- Afghanistan (1 November 2024)
- Argentina (18 June 2024)
- Botswana (27 December 2024)
- El Salvador (27 December 2024)
- Estonia (14 November 2023)
- Greece (29 November 2024)
- Iran (27 December 2024)
- Mexico (14 November 2023)
- Niger (1 November 2024)
- Niue (18 June 2024)
- Russia (28 November 2023)
- South Africa (27 December 2024)

=== Non-participating countries ===
- Albania
- Andorra
- Bahamas
- Belarus
- Bosnia and Herzegovina
- Congo
- Cook Islands
- Costa Rica
- Cyprus
- Dominica
- Ecuador
- Eritrea
- Georgia
- Iraq
- Kiribati
- Lebanon
- Libya
- Liechtenstein
- Maldives
- Morocco
- Myanmar
- Namibia
- New Zealand
- Nicaragua
- North Korea
- Syria
- Venezuela

=== International organizations ===
- ASEAN
- European Union
- International Red Cross and Red Crescent Movement
- International Solar Alliance
- International Science and Technology Center
- ITER
- United Nations

=== Withdrawn international organizations ===
- African Union
- Pacific Islands Forum

== Pavilions ==
The Expo was held on an artificial island called Yumeshima, located in Osaka Bay, with a view of the Seto Inland Sea. In addition to Sou Fujimoto's Grand Ring, additional structures and pavilions were designed by well known Japanese and international architects and designers such as Shigeru Ban, Atelier Brückner, Norman Foster, Lina Ghotmeh, Kengo Kuma, Michele de Lucchi, Yuko Nagayama, Nendo, Yoichi Ochiai, Carlo Ratti, RAU Architects, and SANAA. The Pavilion area was located in the Expo's centre, with waters in the southern part and greenery in the western part of the expo. The following countries would have pavilions present at the Expo:

=== Self-built pavilions (Type A) ===
- Japan
- Angola
- Australia
- Austria
- Azerbaijan
- Bahrain
- Belgium
- Brazil
- Bulgaria
- Canada
- China
- Colombia
- Czech Republic
- France
- Germany
- Hungary
- India
- Indonesia
- Ireland
- Italy
  - Vatican City
- Kuwait
- Luxembourg
- Malaysia
- Malta
- Monaco
- Nepal
- Netherlands
- (Nordic Council) Nordic Pavilion
  - Denmark
  - Finland
  - Iceland
  - Norway
  - Sweden
- Oman
- Philippines
- Poland
- Portugal
- Qatar
- Romania
- Saudi Arabia
- Serbia
- Singapore
- South Korea
- Spain
- Switzerland
- Thailand
- Turkey
- Turkmenistan
- United Arab Emirates
- United Kingdom
- United States
- Uzbekistan

=== Small pavilions (Type B) ===
- Algeria
- Baltics: Latvia Lithuania
- Bangladesh
- Cambodia
- Chile
- Egypt
- European Union
- IFRC
- Jordan
- Mozambique
- Peru
- Senegal
- Tunisia
- United Nations
- Vietnam

=== Commons A pavilions ===
- Barbados
- Bolivia
- Burundi
- Comoros
- Eswatini
- Ghana
- Grenada
- Guinea-Bissau
- Kenya
- Kosovo
- Kyrgyzstan
- Malawi
- Mauritius
- North Macedonia
- Palau
- Papua New Guinea
- Rwanda
- Saint Kitts and Nevis
- Saint Lucia
- Samoa
- Seychelles
- Solomon Islands
- Sri Lanka
- Suriname
- Tonga
- Trinidad and Tobago
- Uganda
- Vanuatu
- Yemen

=== Commons B pavilions ===
- Benin
- Central African Republic
- Djibouti
- Dominican Republic
- Ethiopia
- Fiji
- Gambia
- Guyana
- Haiti
- Ivory Coast
- Jamaica
- Lesotho
- Mauritania
- Federated States of Micronesia
- Nauru
- Paraguay
- Saint Vincent and the Grenadines
- Somalia
- Tanzania
- Timor-Leste
- Tuvalu
- Zambia
- Zimbabwe
- Smallest Pavilion in Commons B
  - Cape Verde
  - Chad
  - Sierra Leone

=== Commons C pavilions ===
- Croatia
- Gabon
- Guatemala
- Israel
- Montenegro
- Panama
- San Marino
- Slovakia
- Slovenia
- Ukraine
- Uruguay

=== Commons D pavilions ===
- Antigua and Barbuda
- Belize
- Bhutan
- Burkina Faso
- Cameroon
- Cuba
- DR Congo
- Equatorial Guinea
- Guinea
- Honduras
- Laos
- Liberia
- Madagascar
- Mali
- Marshall Islands
- Moldova
- Mongolia
- Nigeria
- Pakistan
- Palestine
- São Tomé and Príncipe
- South Sudan
- Sudan
- Tajikistan
- Togo

=== Commons F pavilions ===
- Armenia
- Brunei
- Kazakhstan

=== Domestic pavilions ===
- Women's Pavilion in collaboration with Cartier
- Osaka Healthcare Pavilion
- Kansai Pavilion

=== Pavilions for private sectors ===
- Electric Power Pavilion
- Gas Pavilion Obake Wonderland
- Gundam Next Future Pavilion
- Iida Group and Osaka Metropolitan University Joint Pavilion
- Mitsubishi Pavilion
- NTT Pavilion
- ORA Gaishoku Pavilion
- Panasonic Group Pavilio
- Pasona Pavilion
- Sumitomo Pavilion
- Tech World Pavilion (Taiwan's private sector pavilion)
- Yoshimoto Pavilion
- Zeri Japan Blue Ocean Dome

=== Signature pavilions ===
- Better Co-Being – Hiroaki Miyata
- Future of Life – Hiroshi Ishiguro
- Playground of Life: Jellyfish Pavilion – Sachiko Nakajima
- null² – Yoichi Ochiai
- Dynamic Equilibrium of Life – Shinichi Fukuoka
- Live Earth Journey – Shoji Kawamori
- Earth Mart – Kundō Koyama
- Dialogue Theater – Naomi Kawase

== Gallery ==
=== Connecting Lives Zone ===
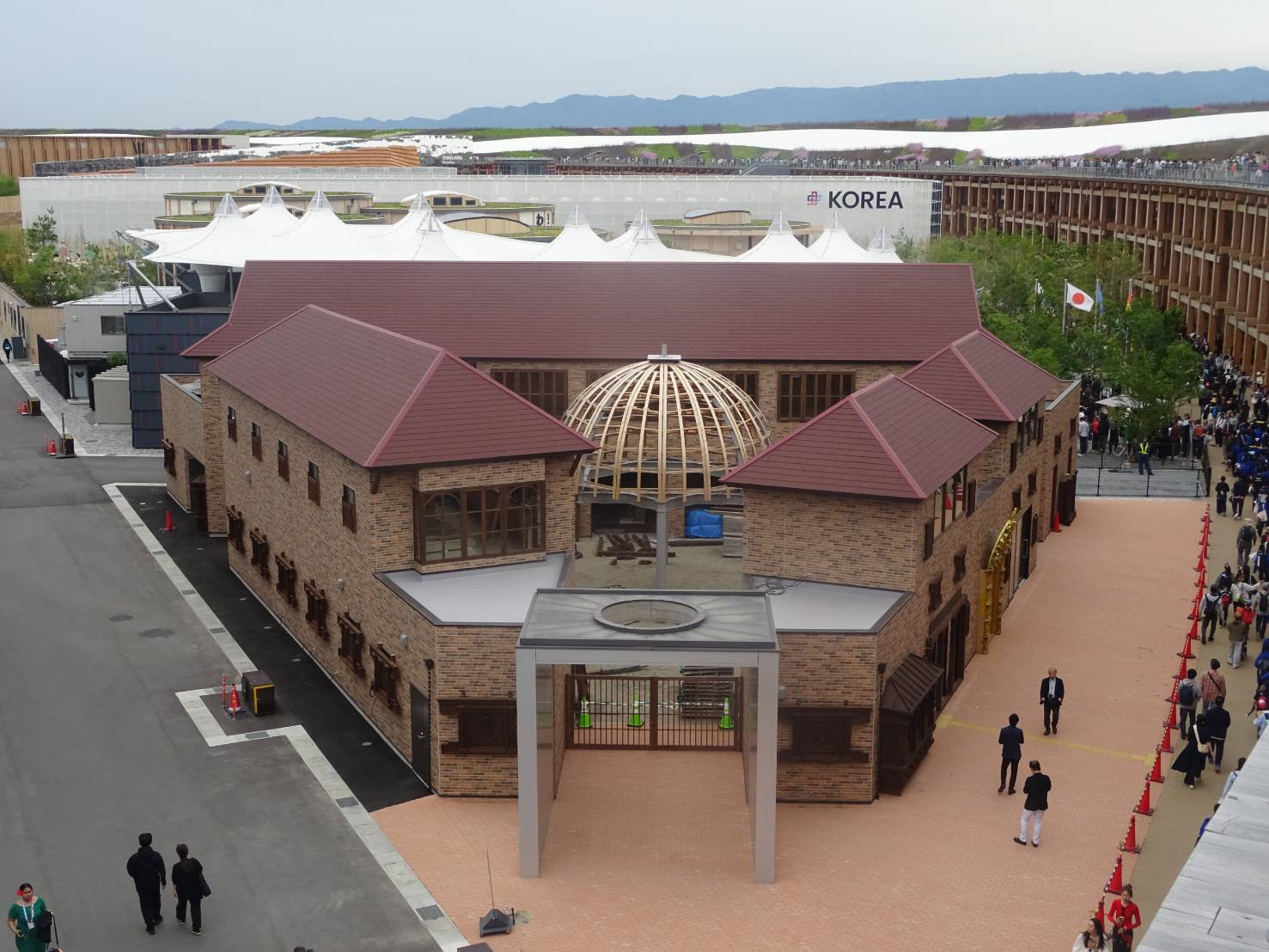
Nepal Pavilion

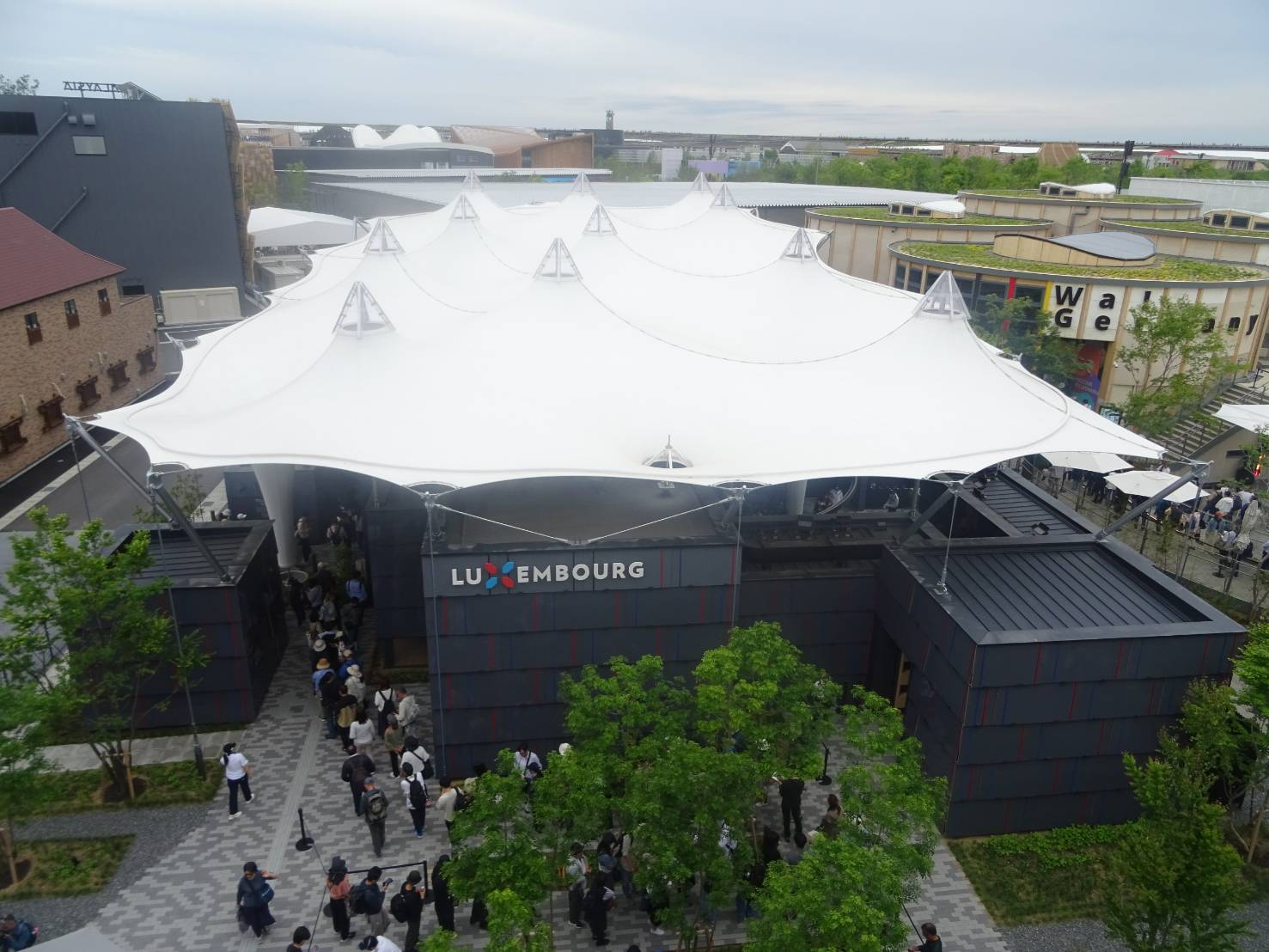
Luxembourg Pavilion

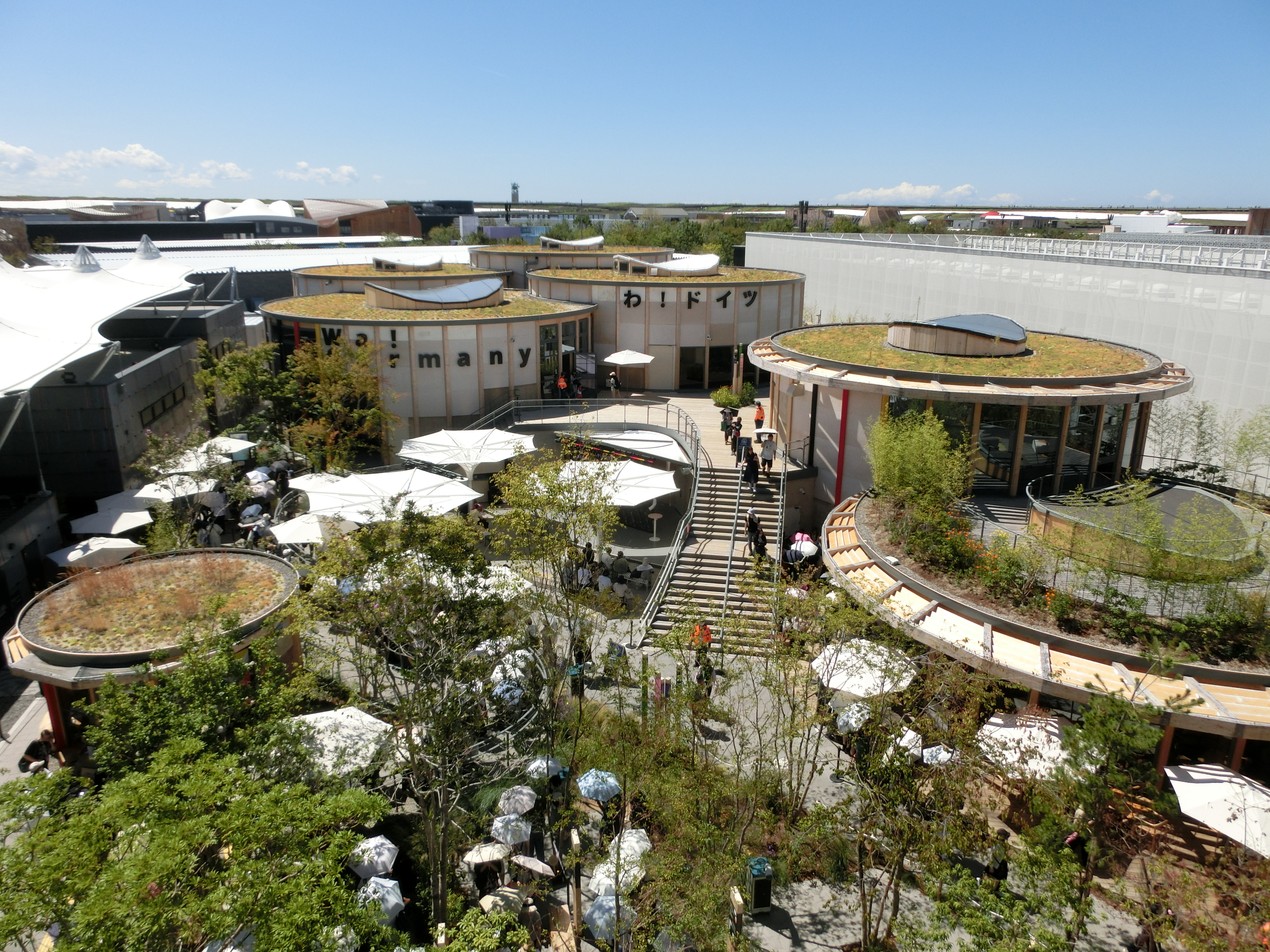
Germany Pavilion

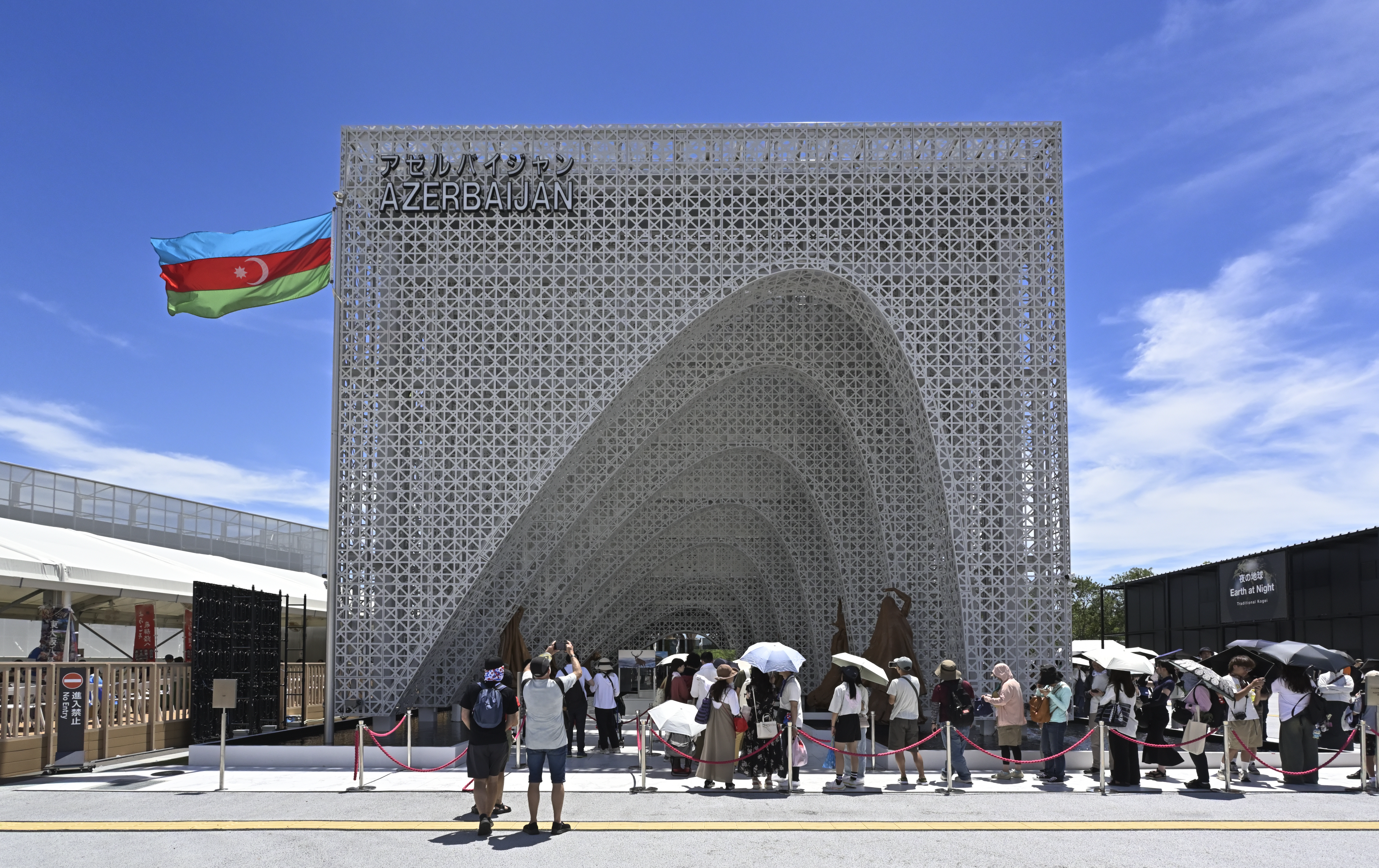
Azerbaijan Pavilion

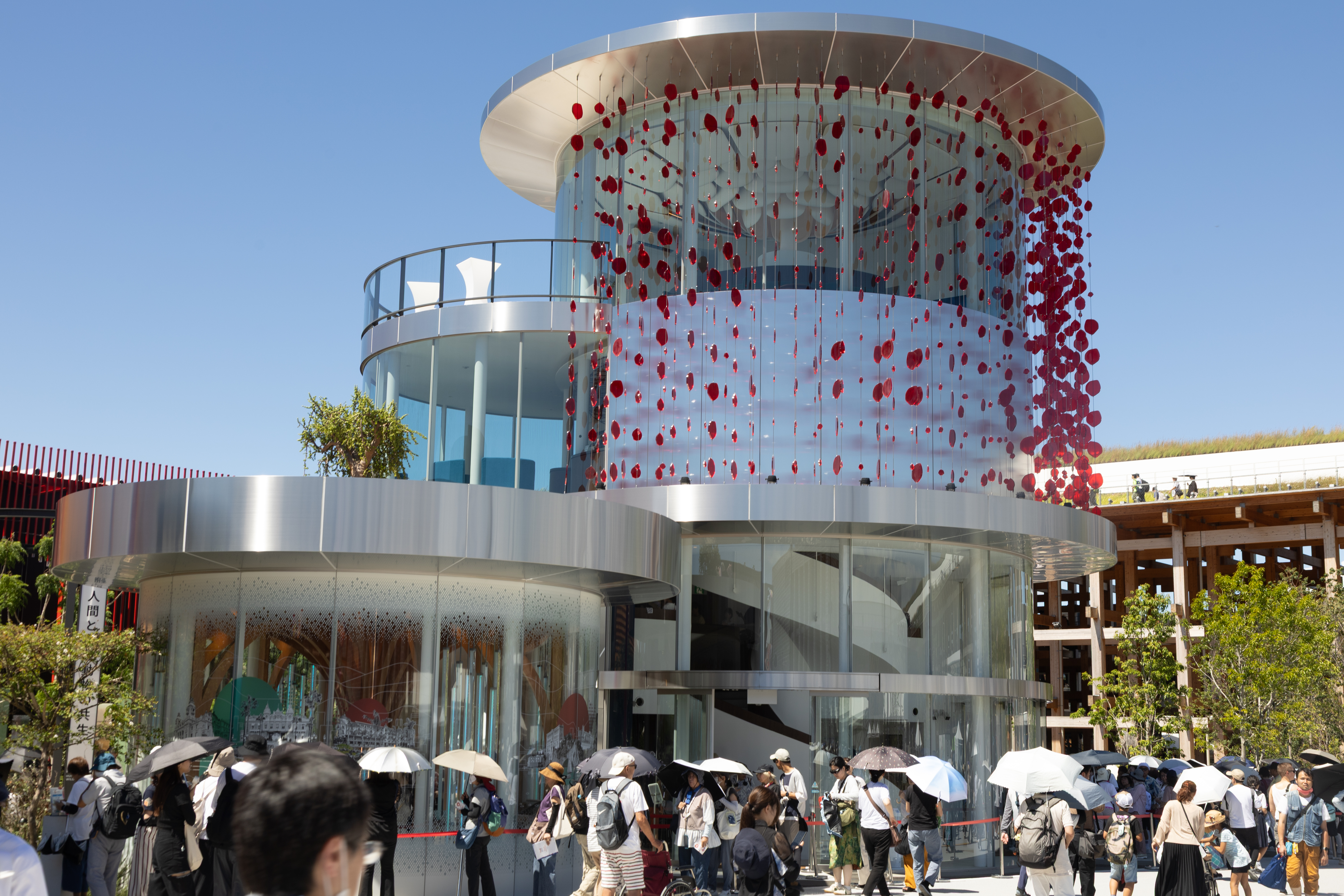
Monaco Pavilion

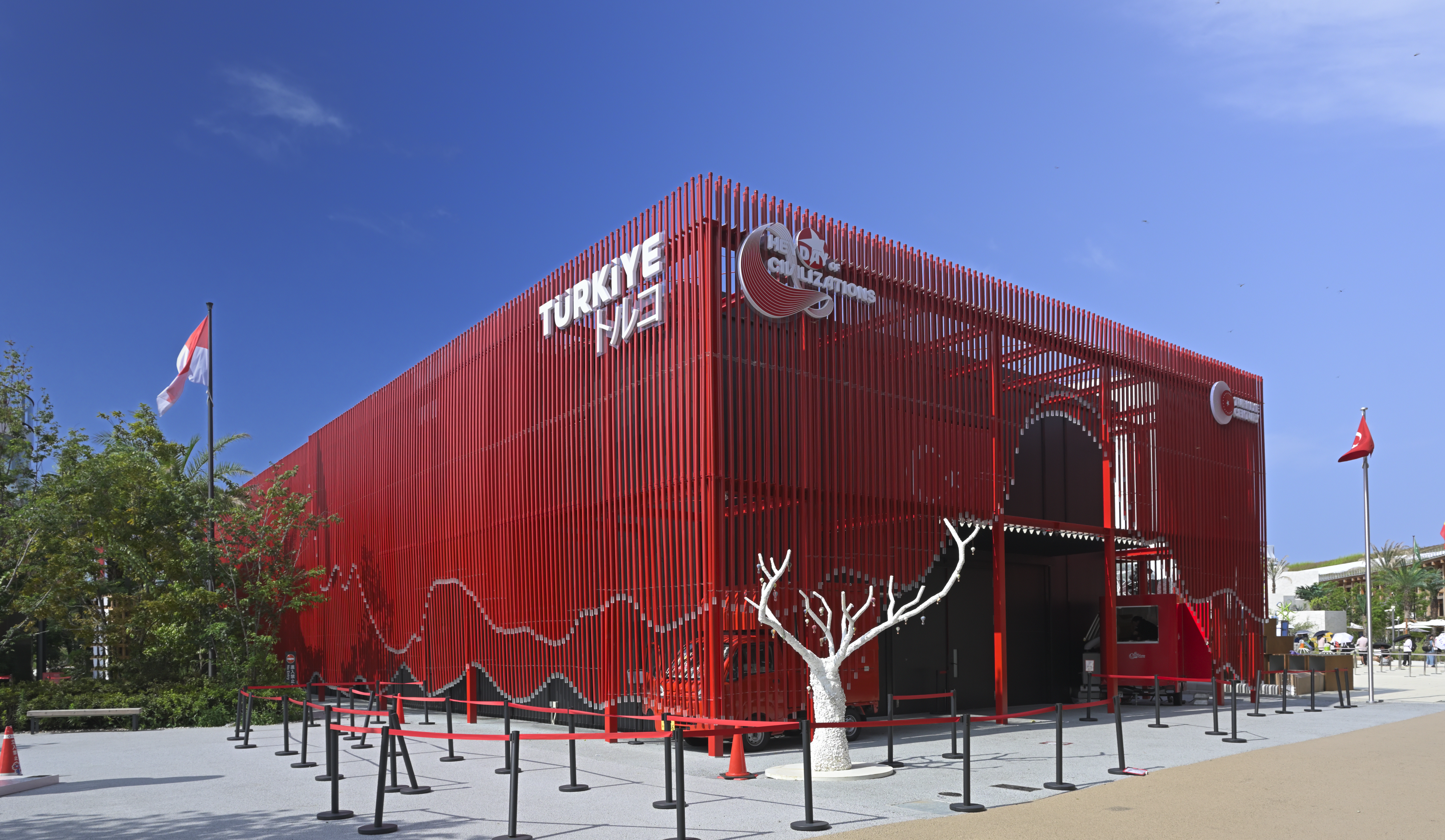
Turkey Pavilion

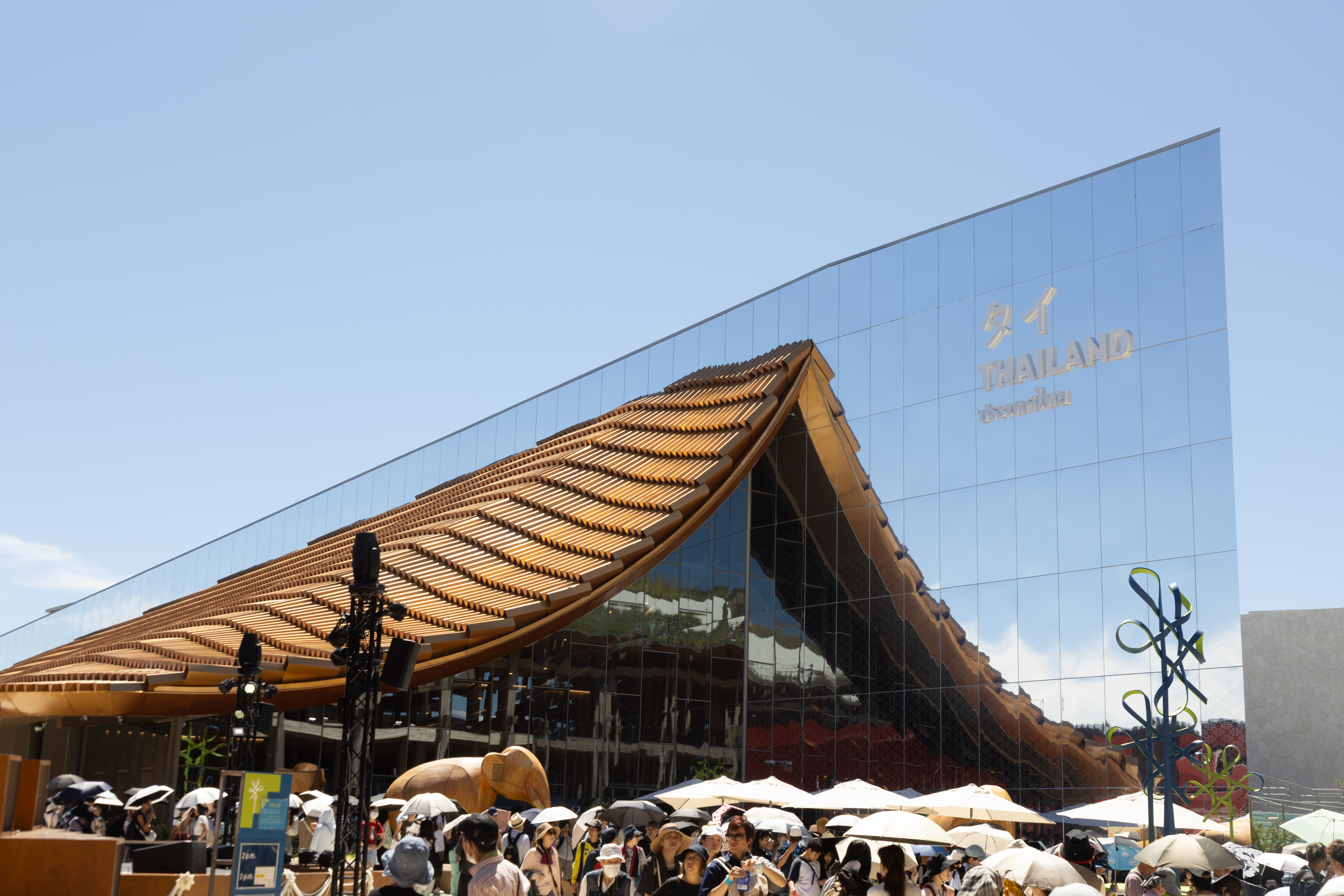
Thailand Pavilion

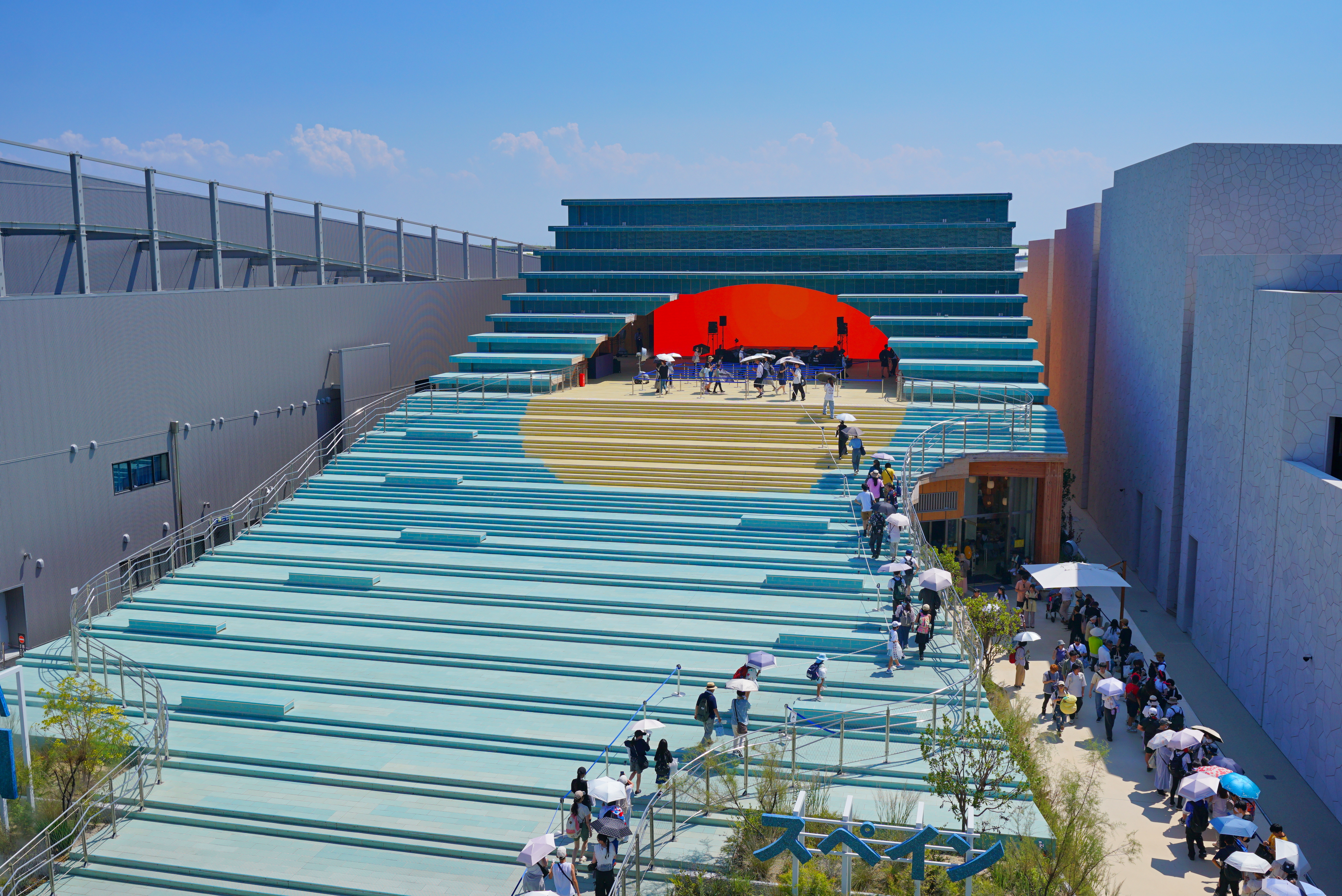
Spain Pavilion

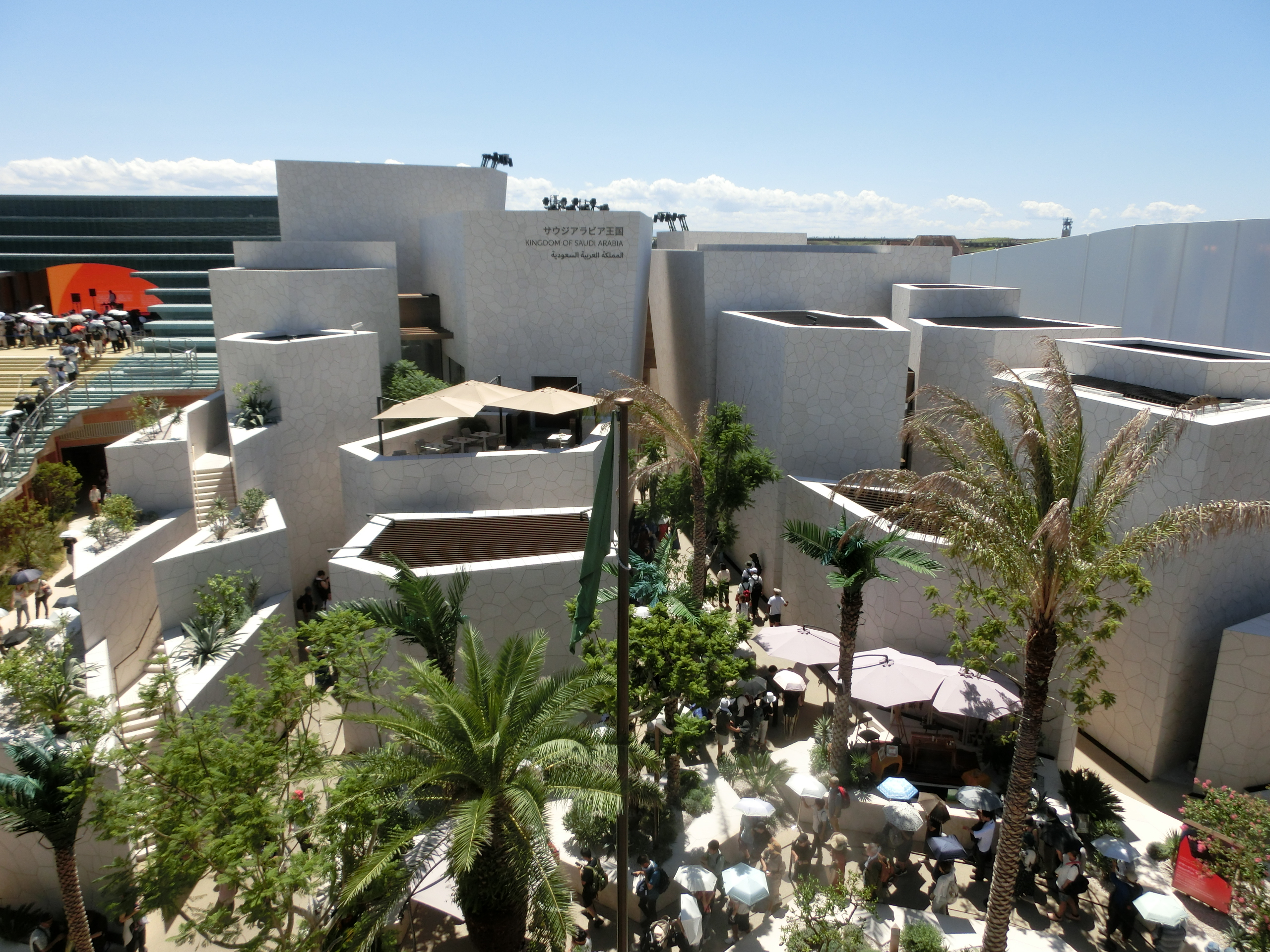
Saudi Arabia Pavilion

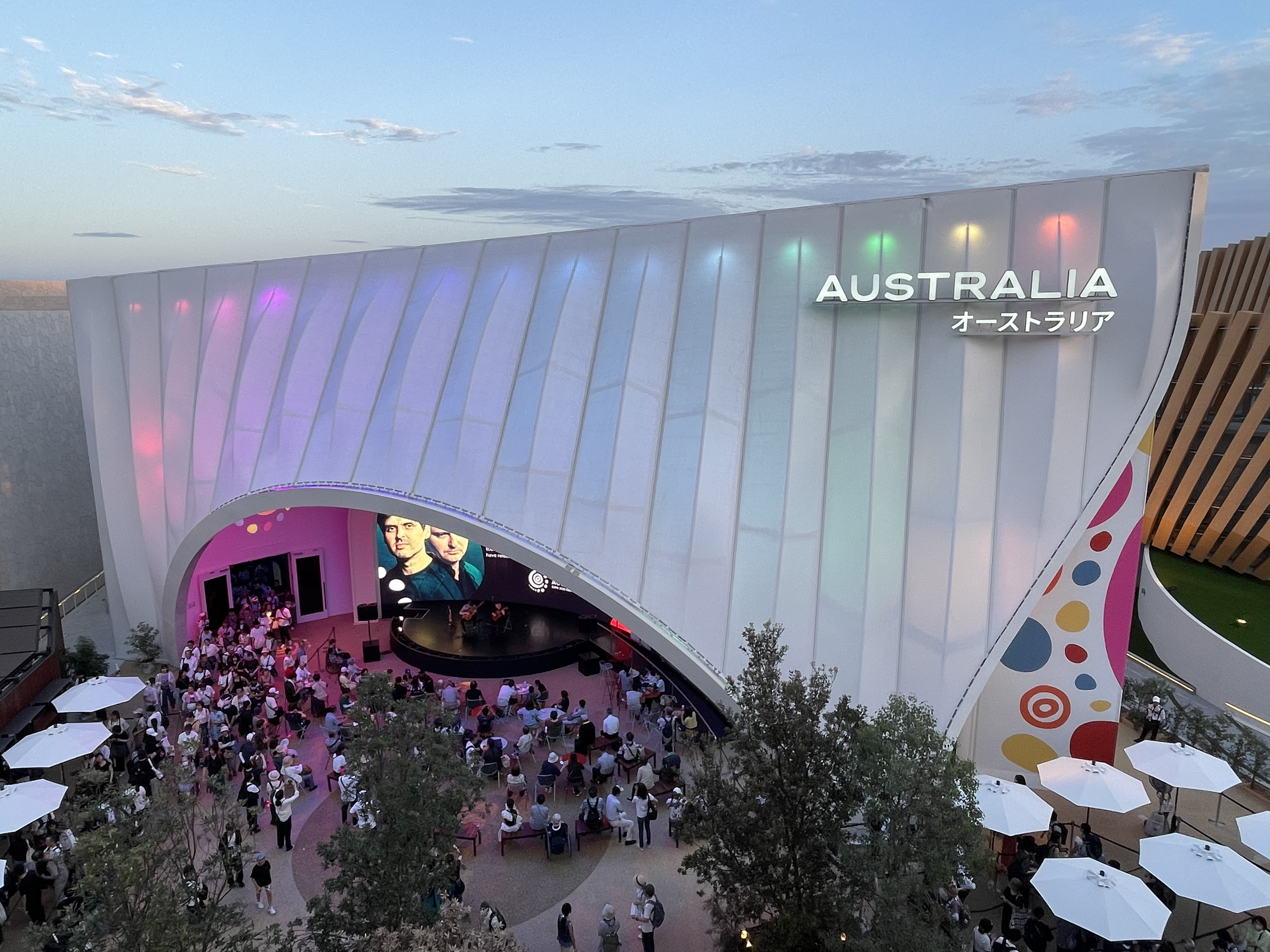
Australia Pavilion

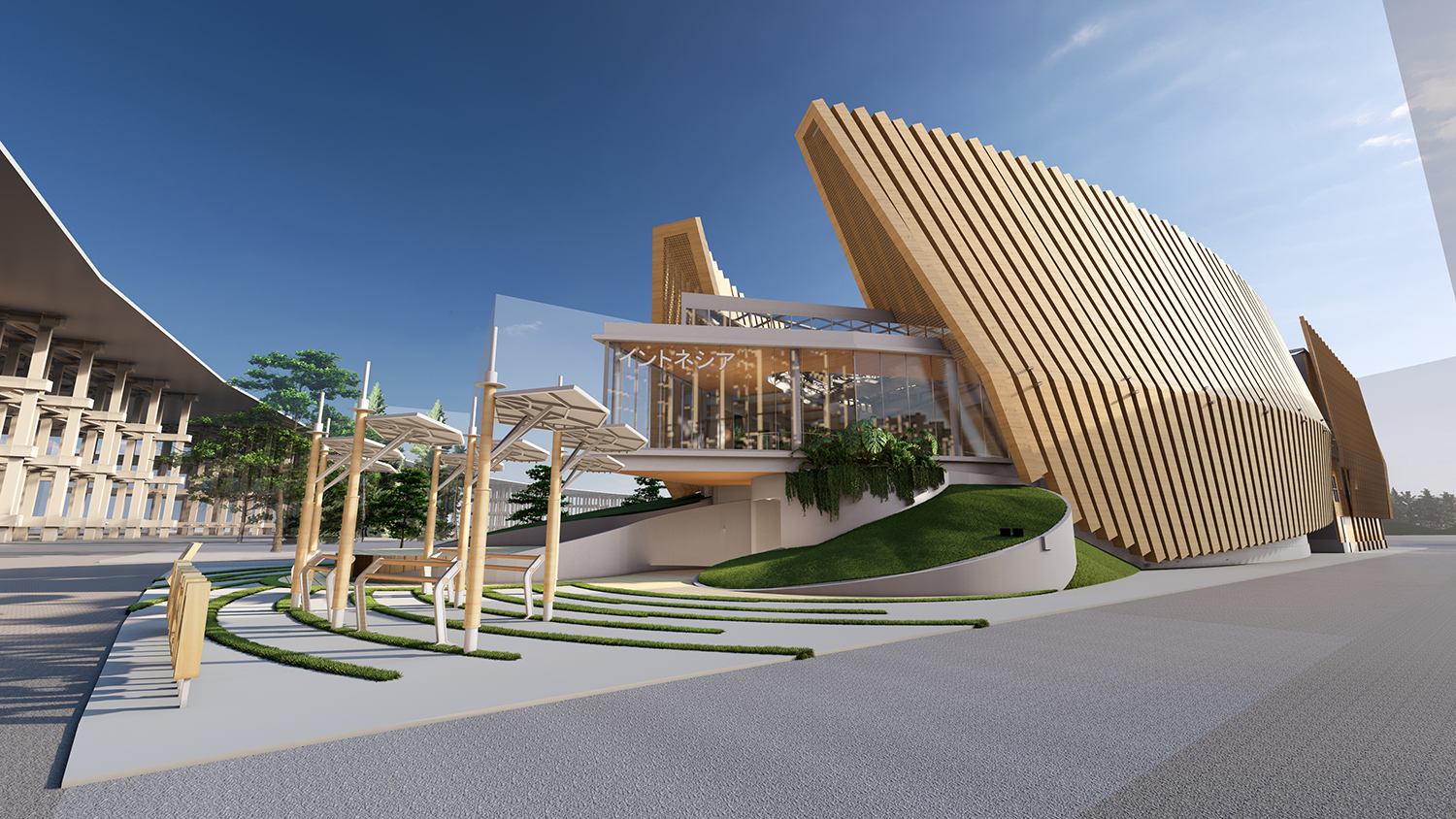
Indonesia Pavilion

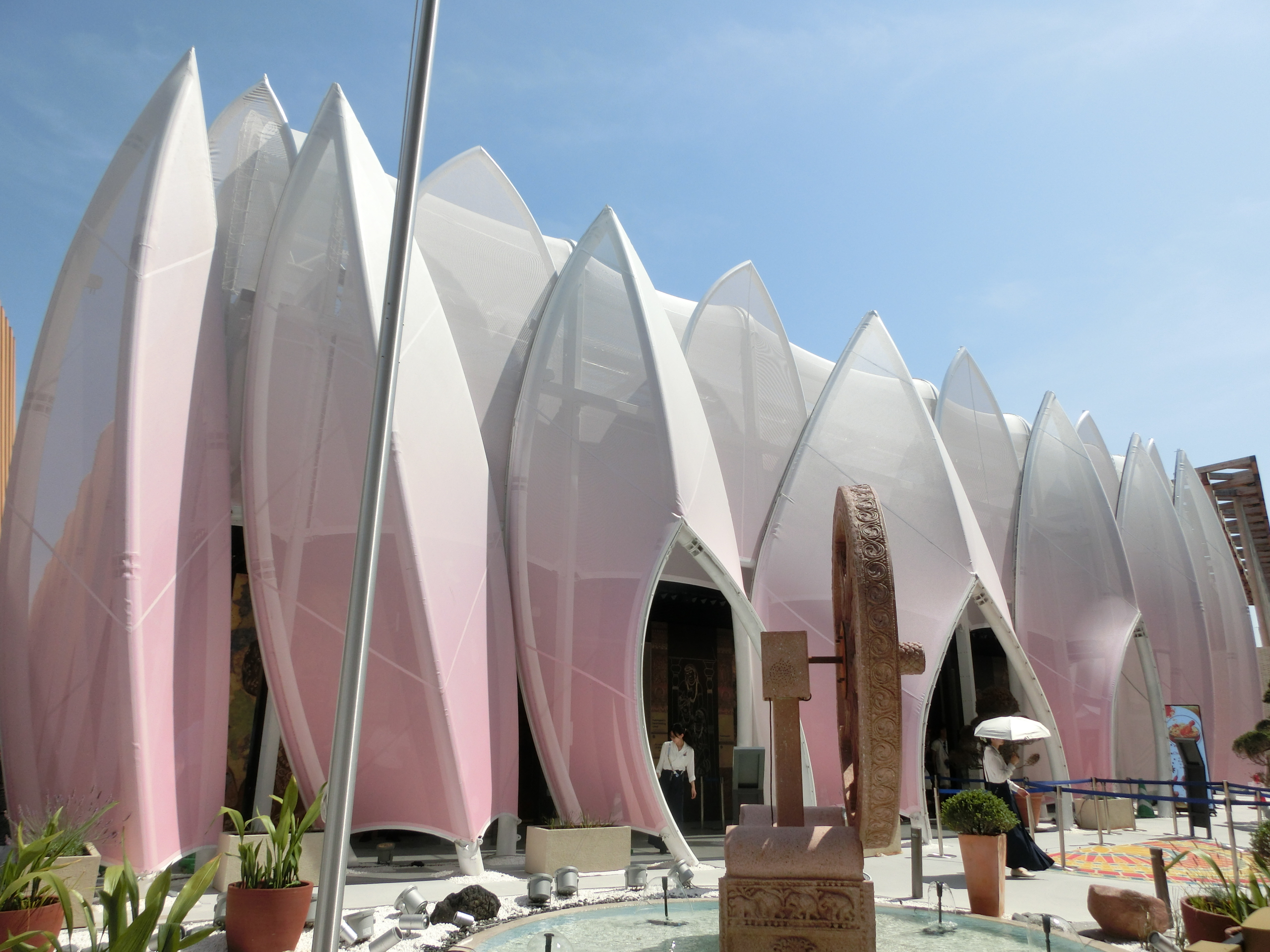
India Pavilion

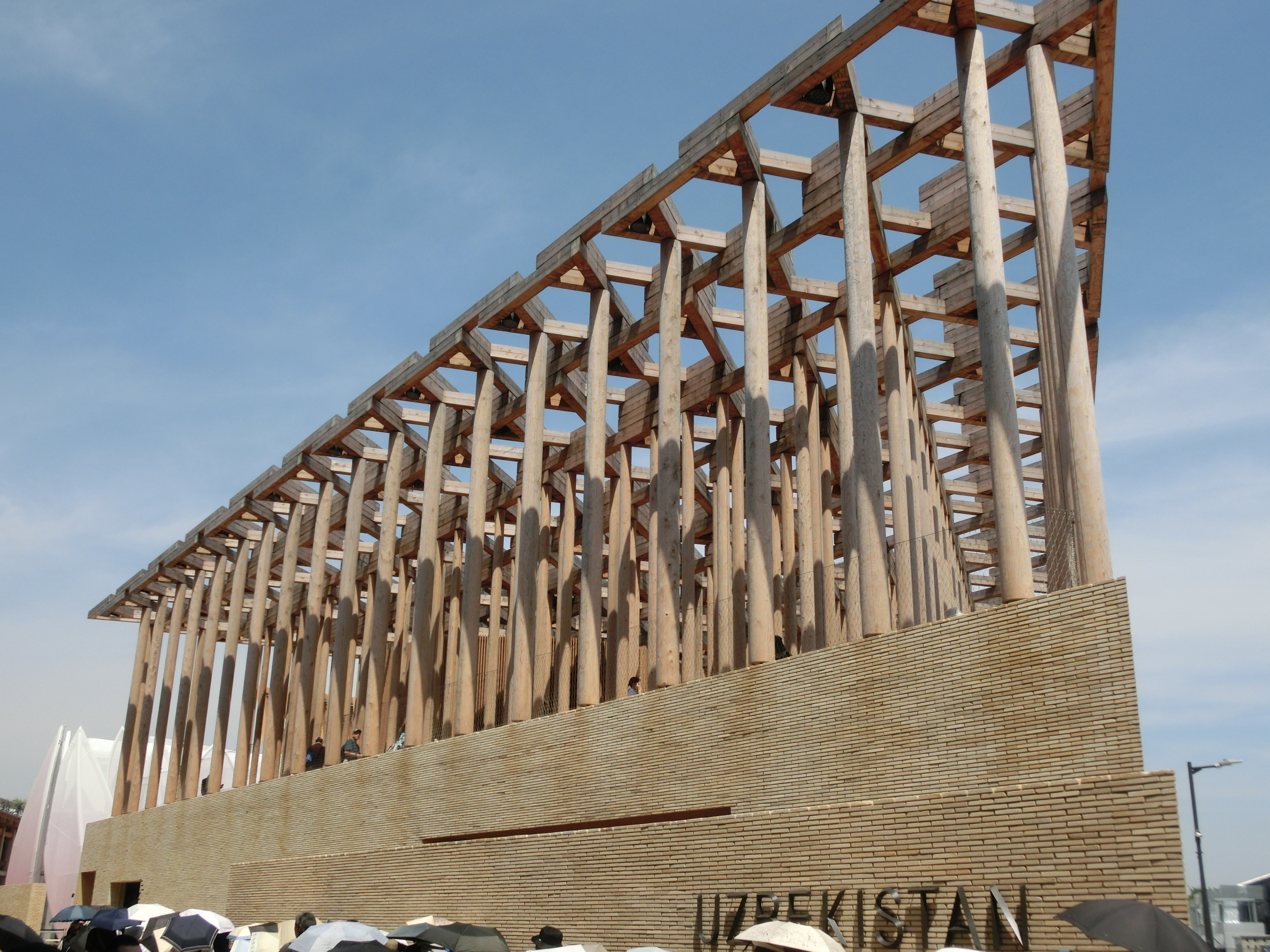
Uzbekistan Pavilion

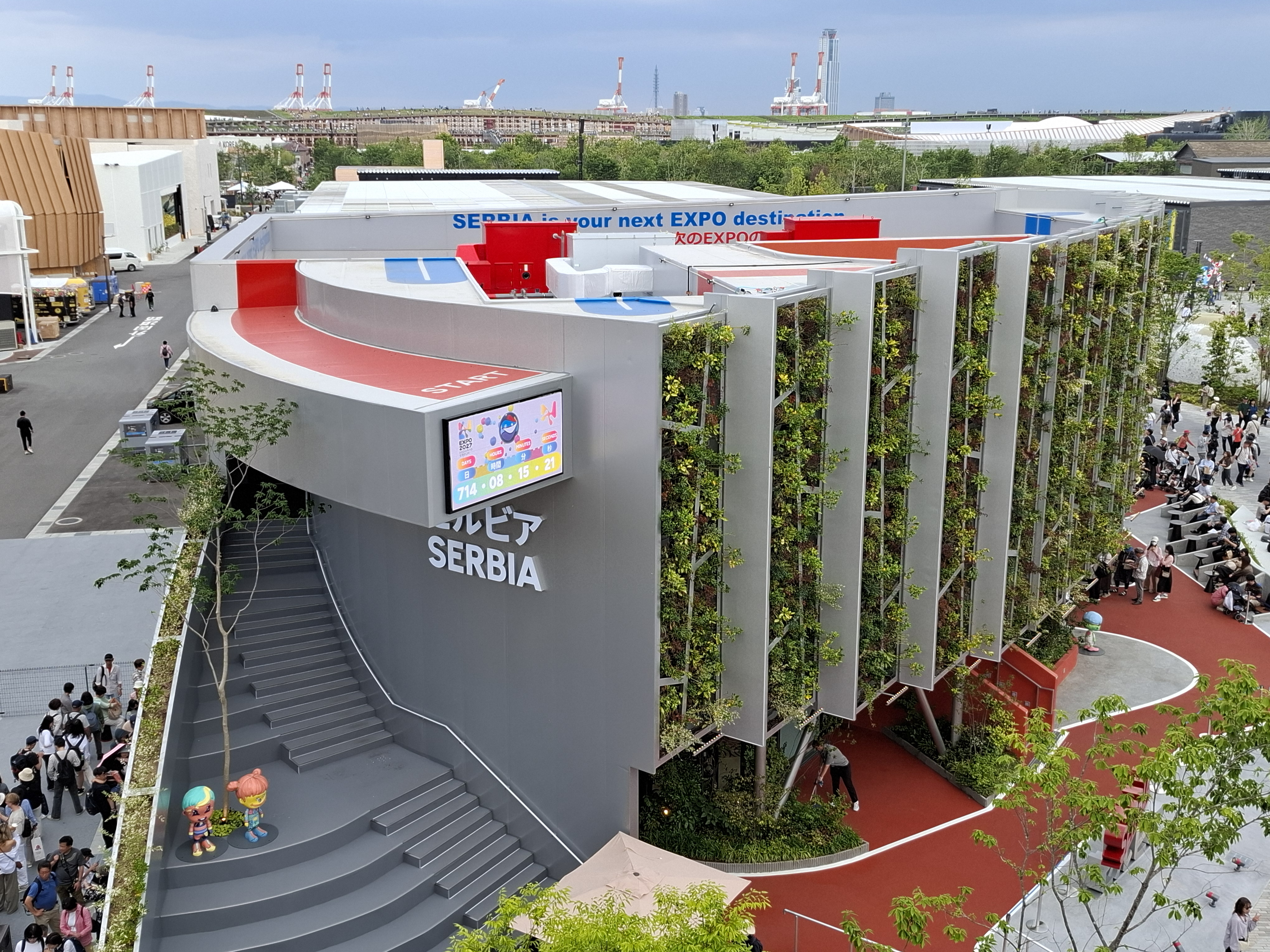
Serbia Pavilion

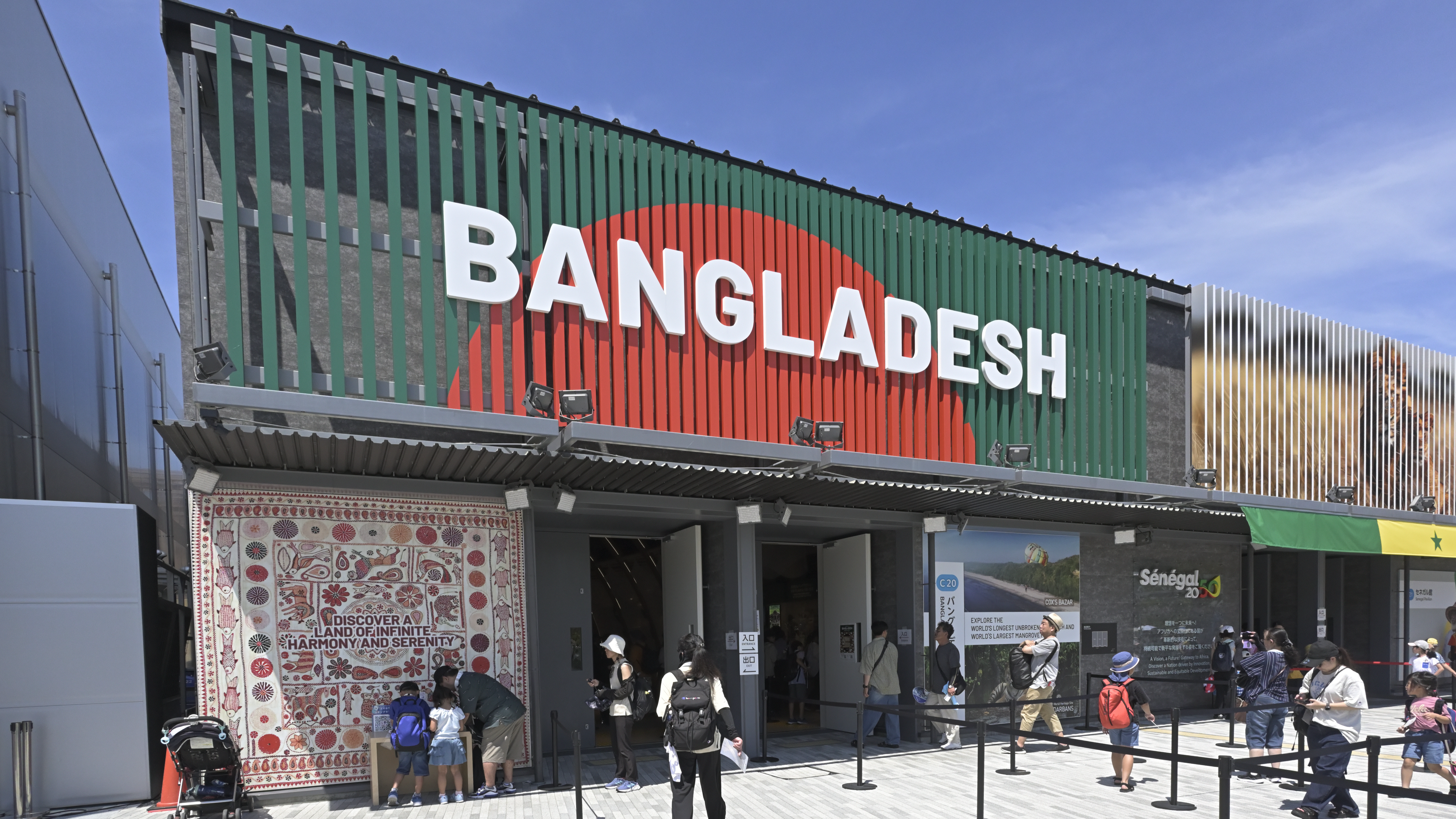
Bangladesh Pavilion

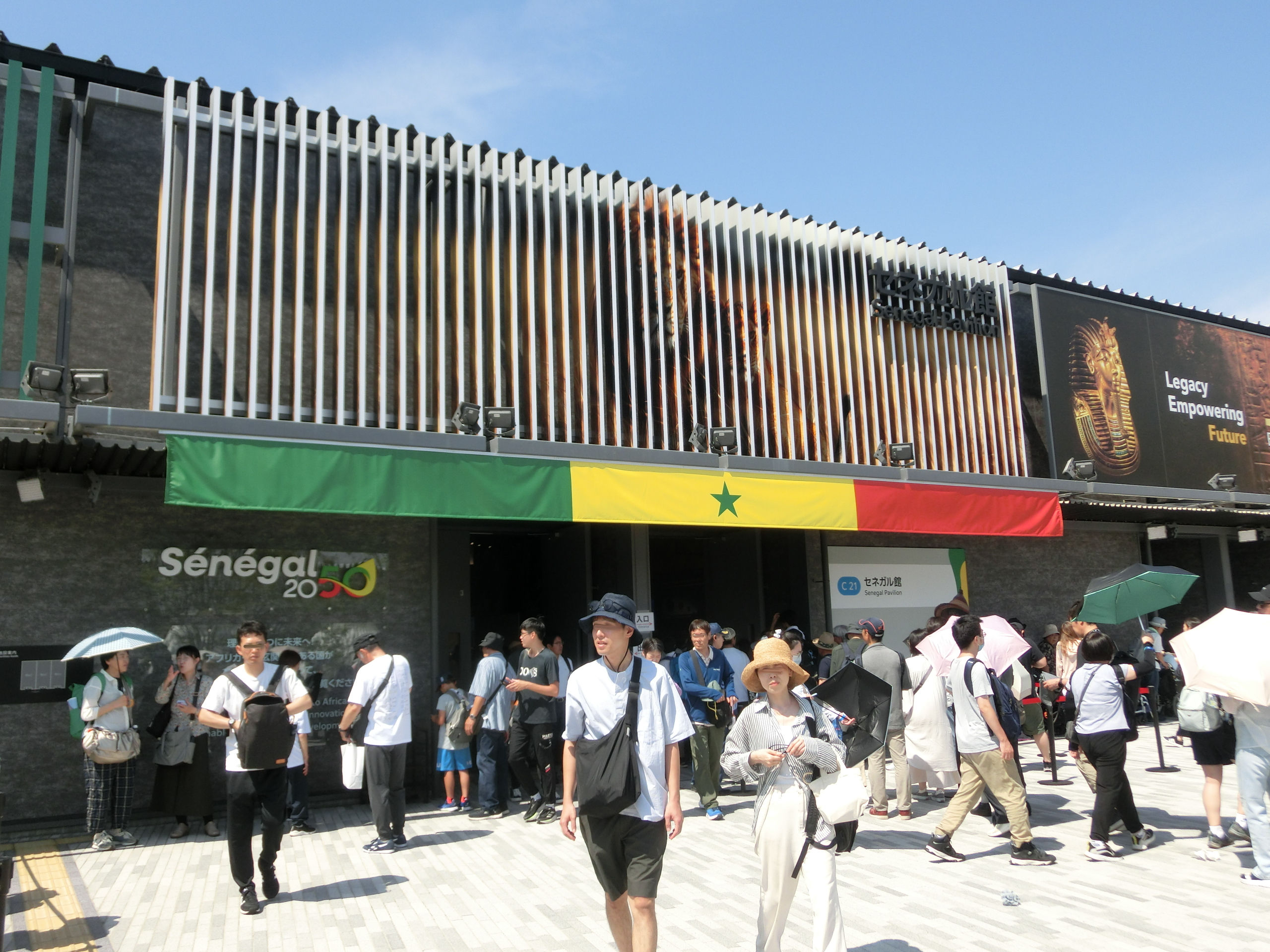
Senegal Pavilion

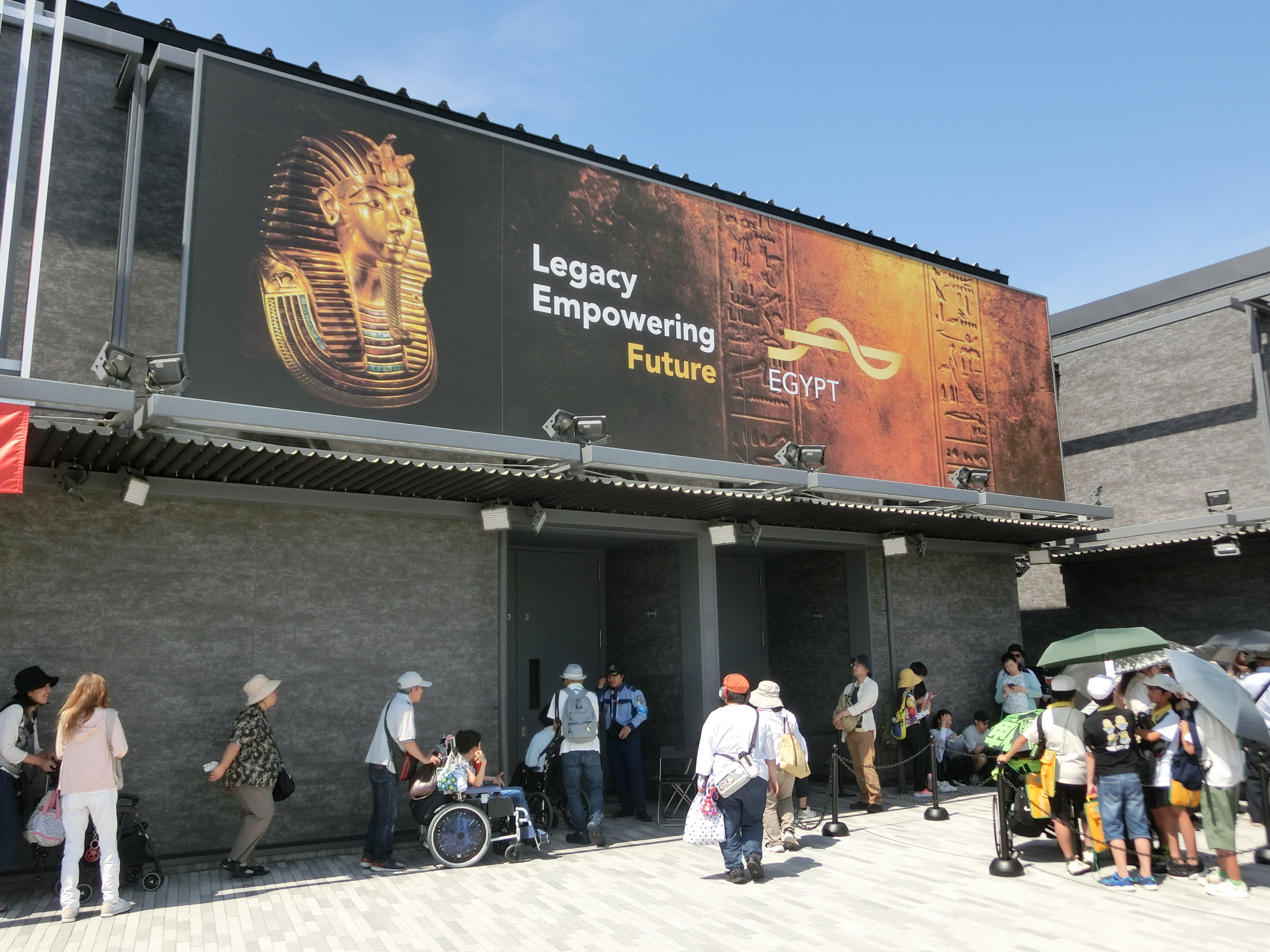
Egypt Pavilion

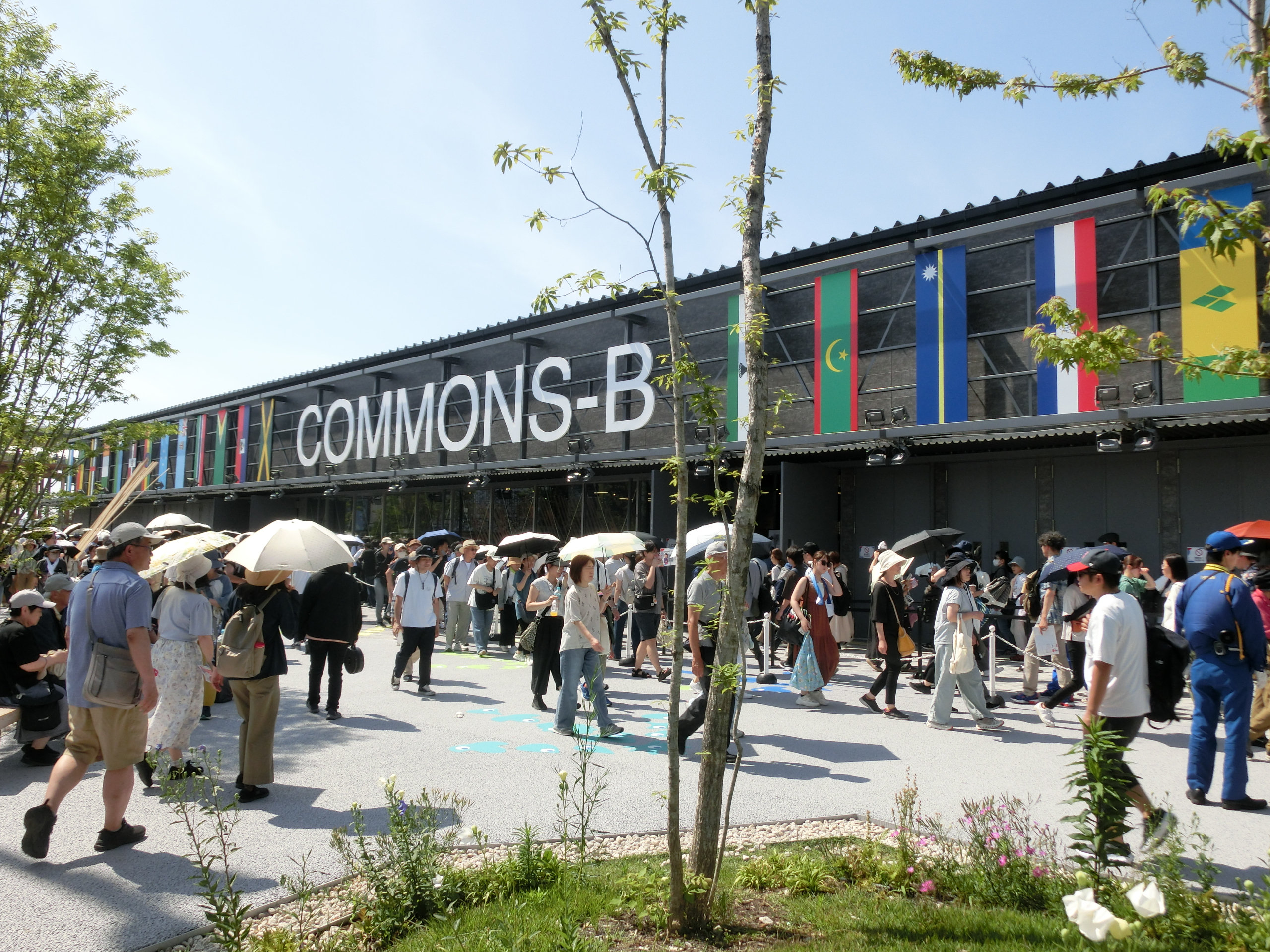
Commons B Pavilion

=== Empowering Lives Zone ===
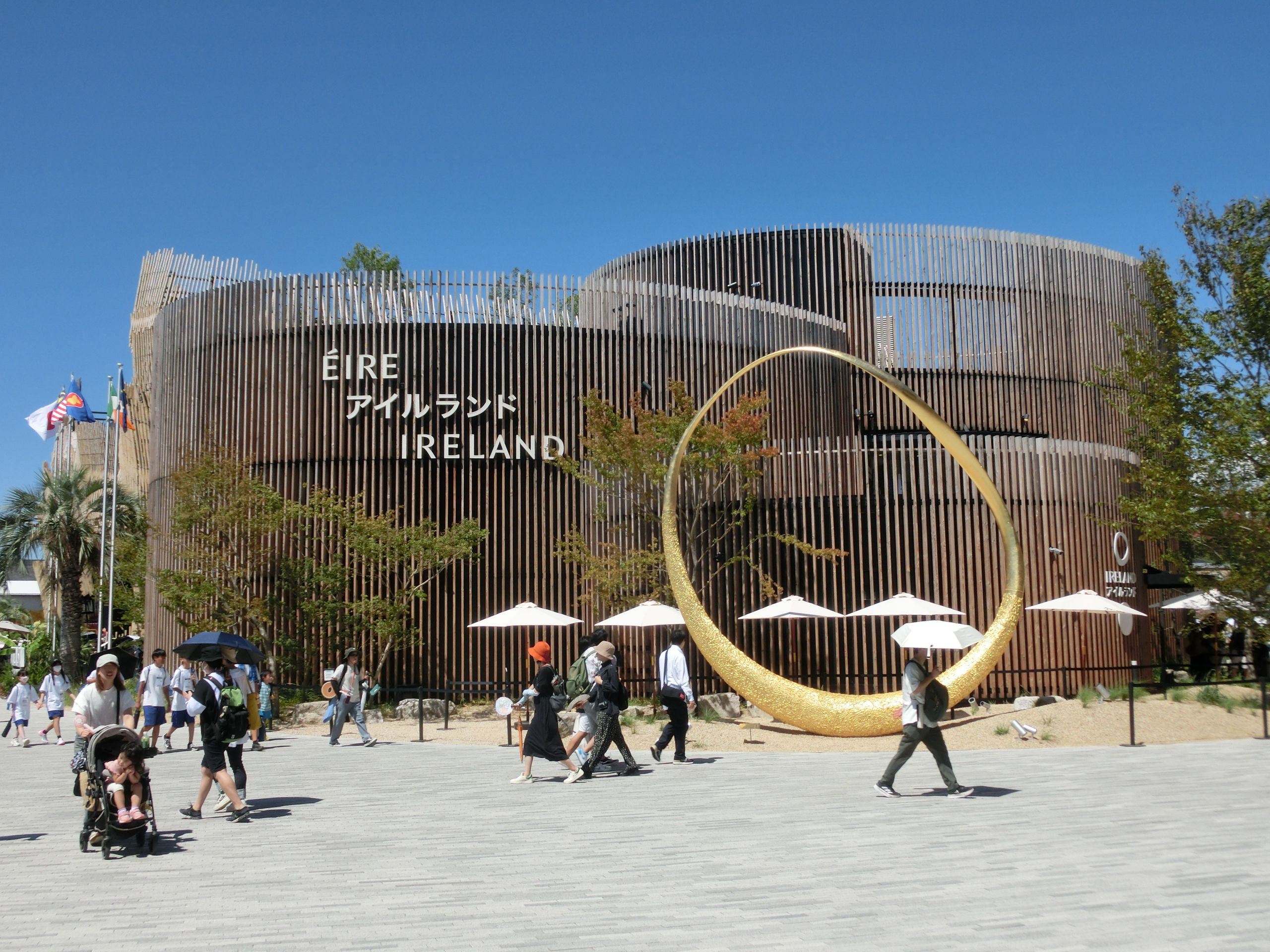
Ireland Pavilion

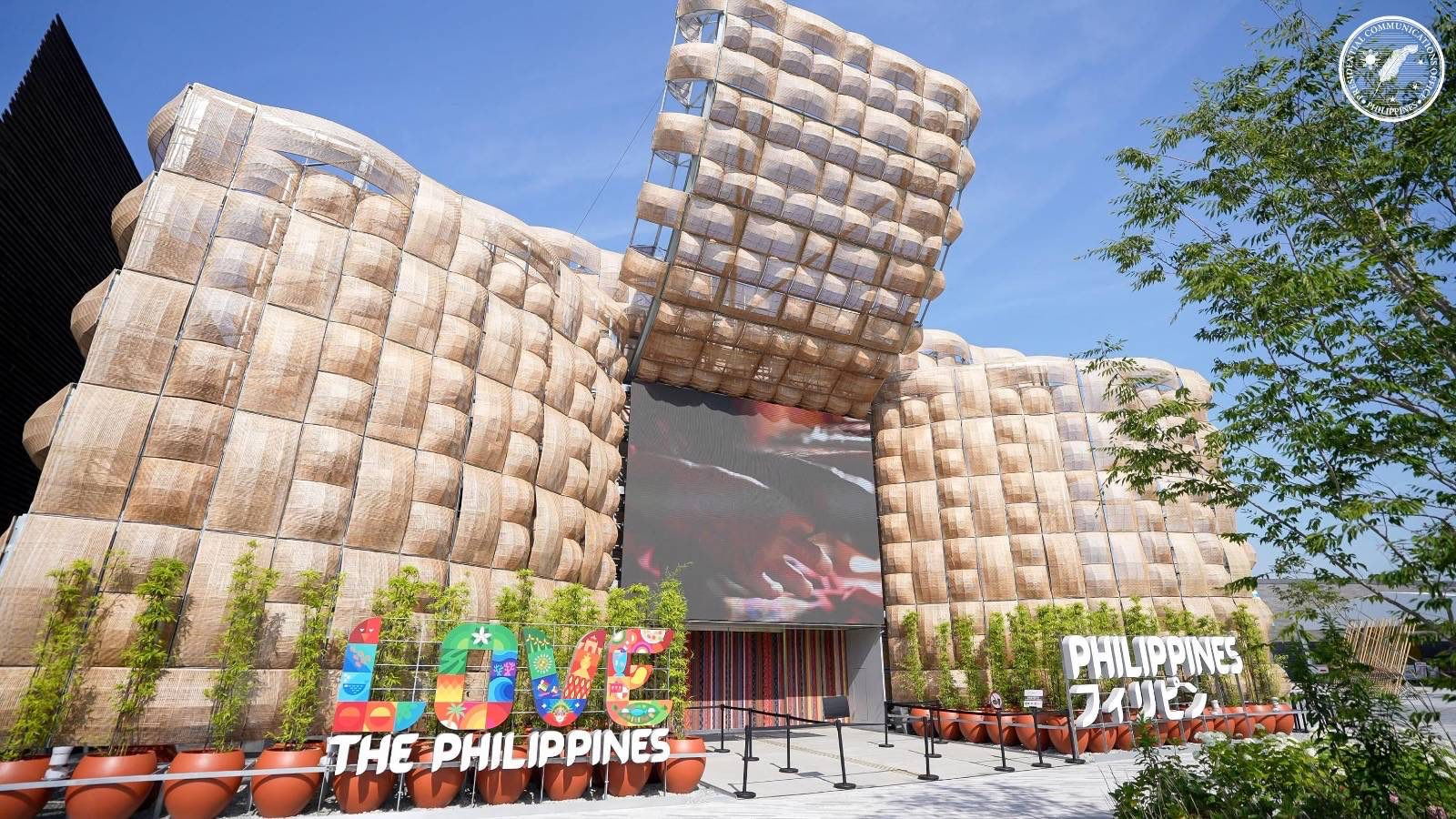
Philippines Pavilion

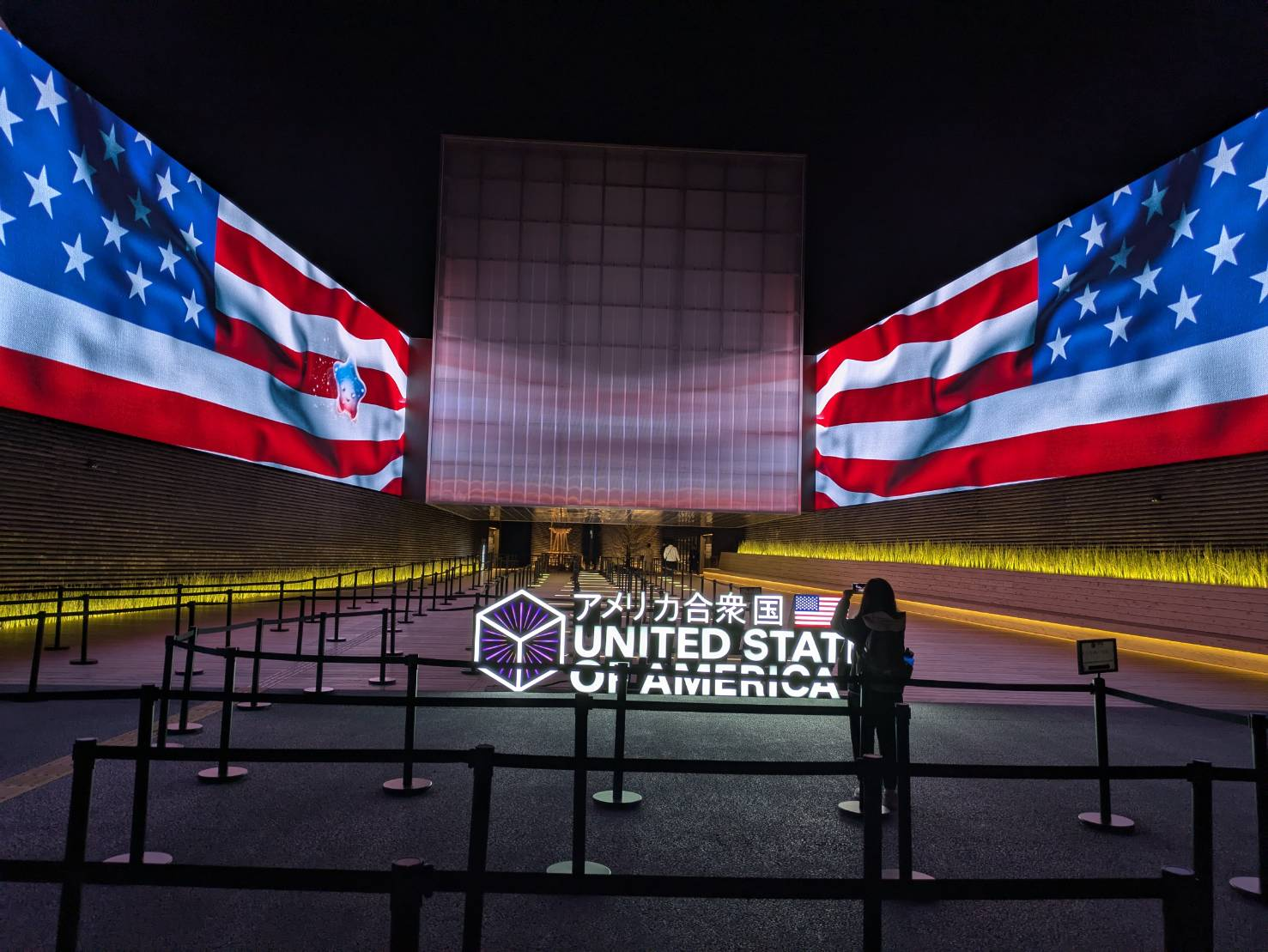
USA Pavilion

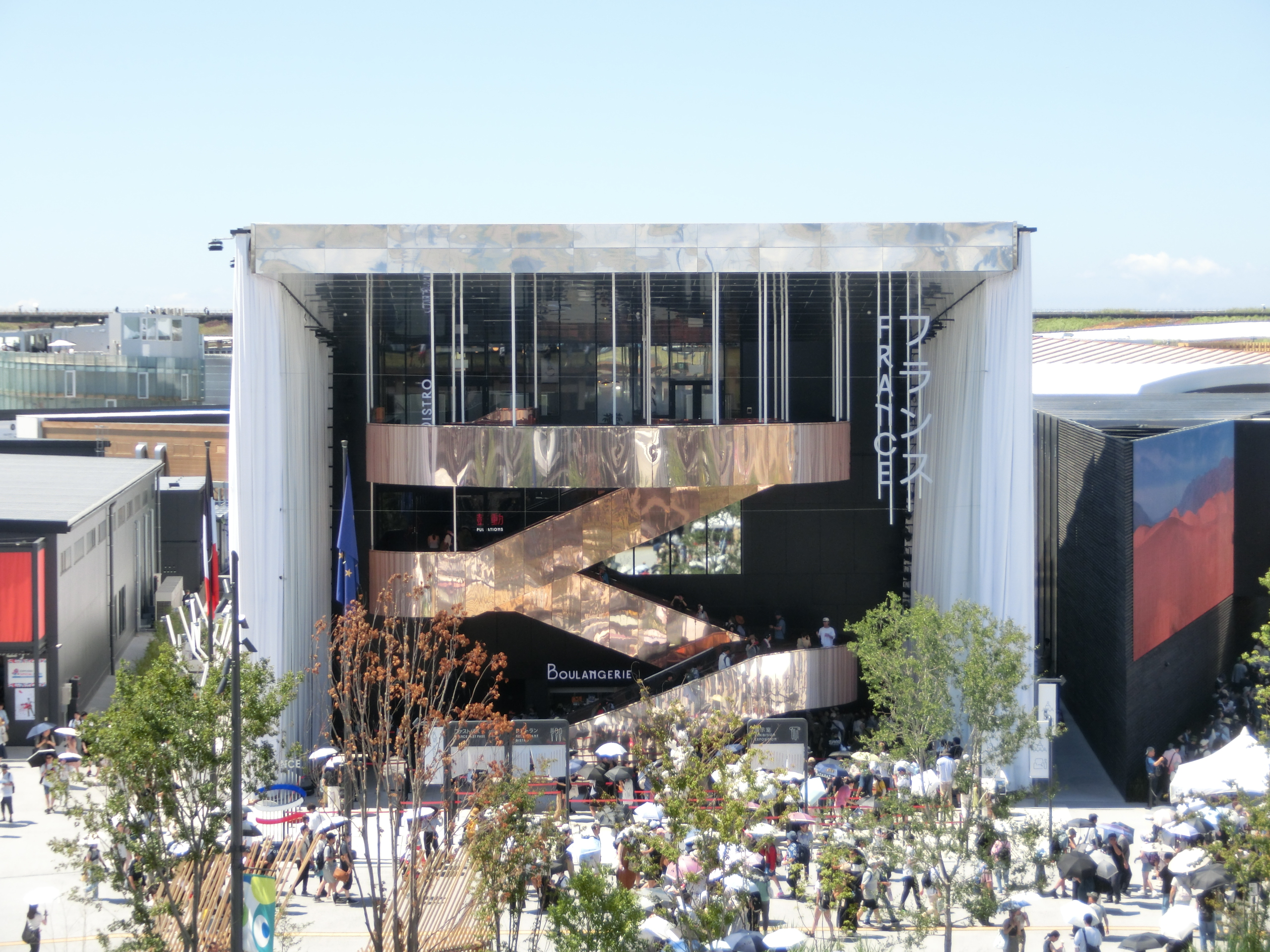
France Pavilion

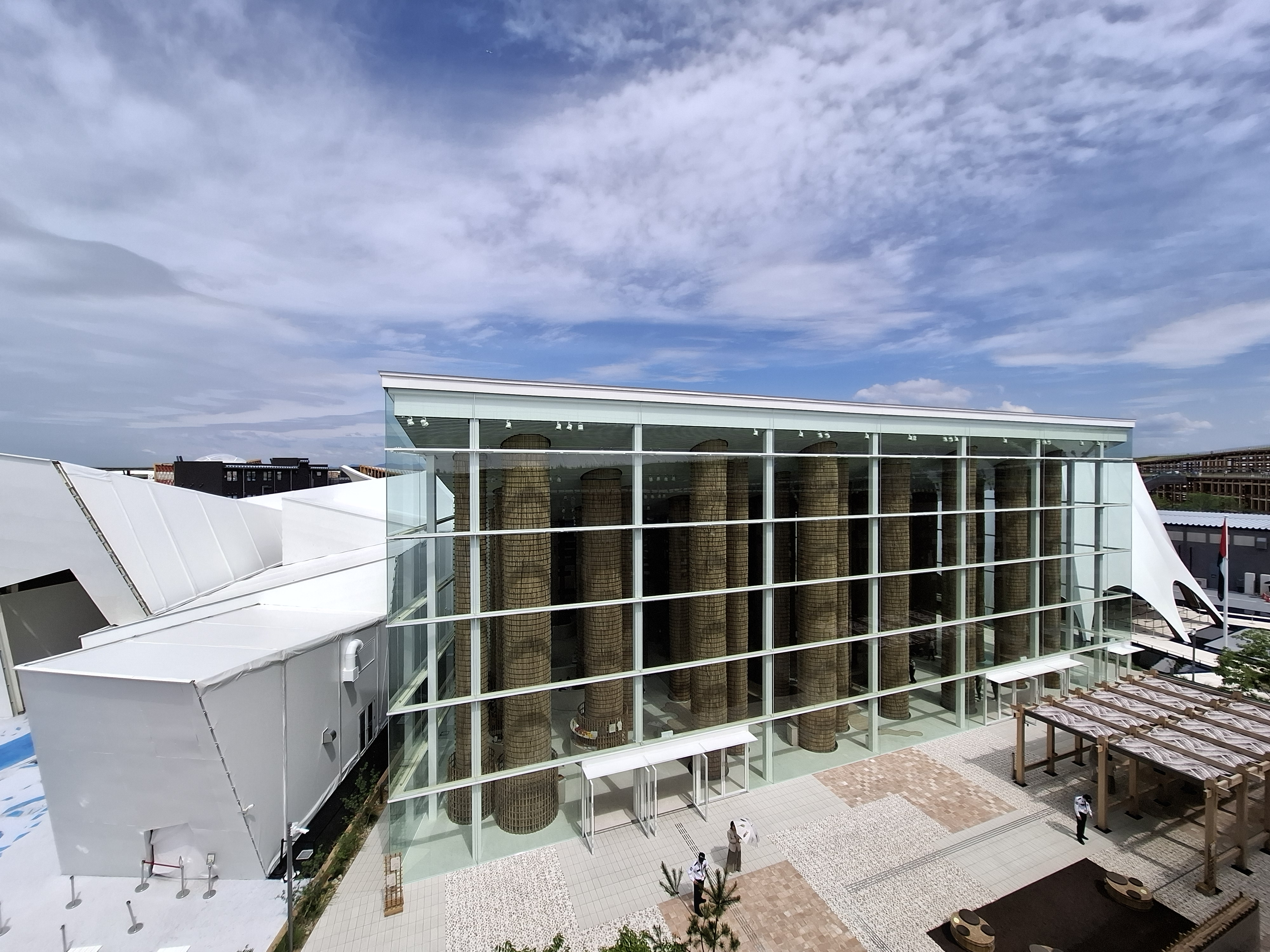
UAE Pavilion

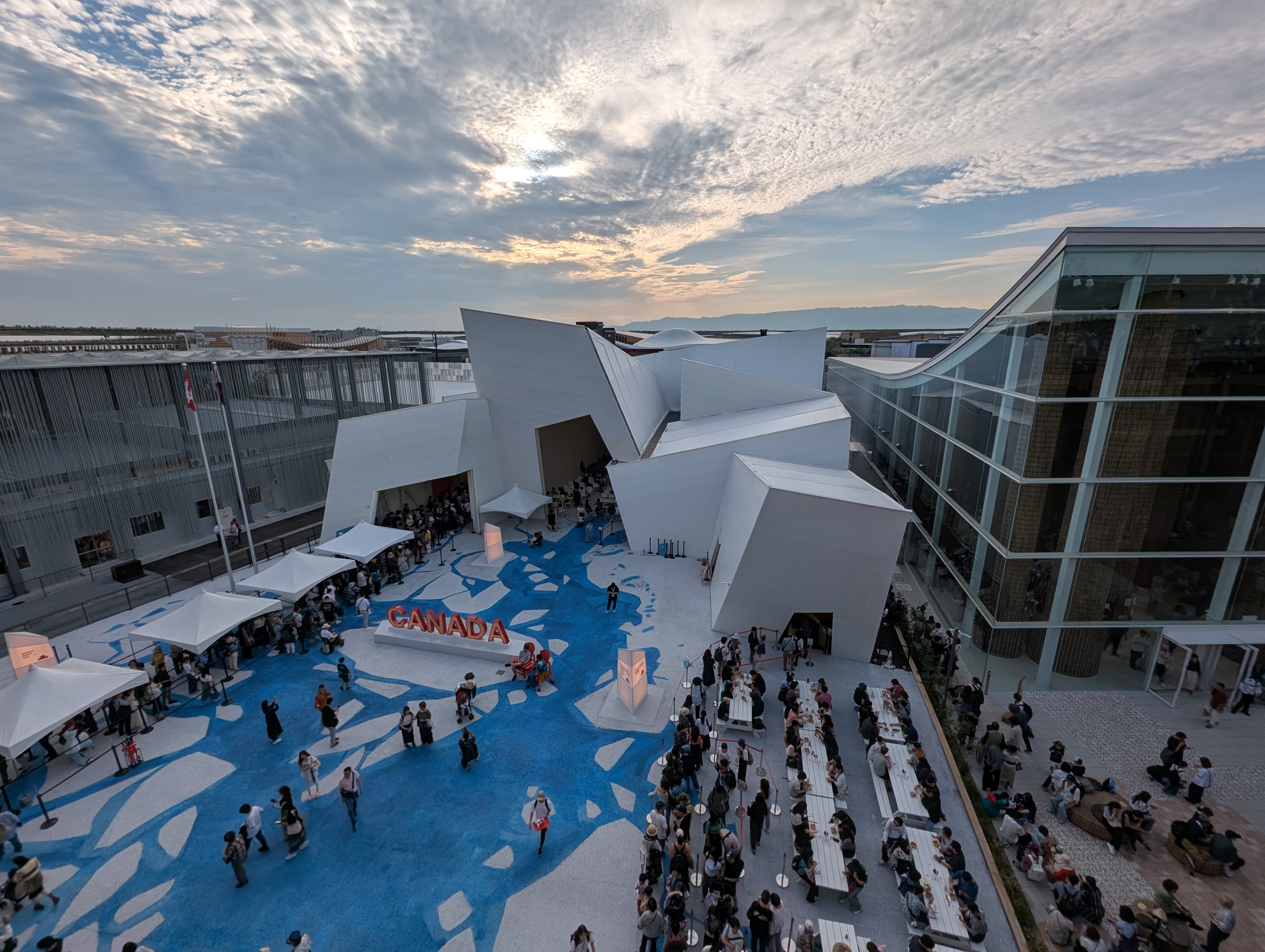
Canada Pavilion

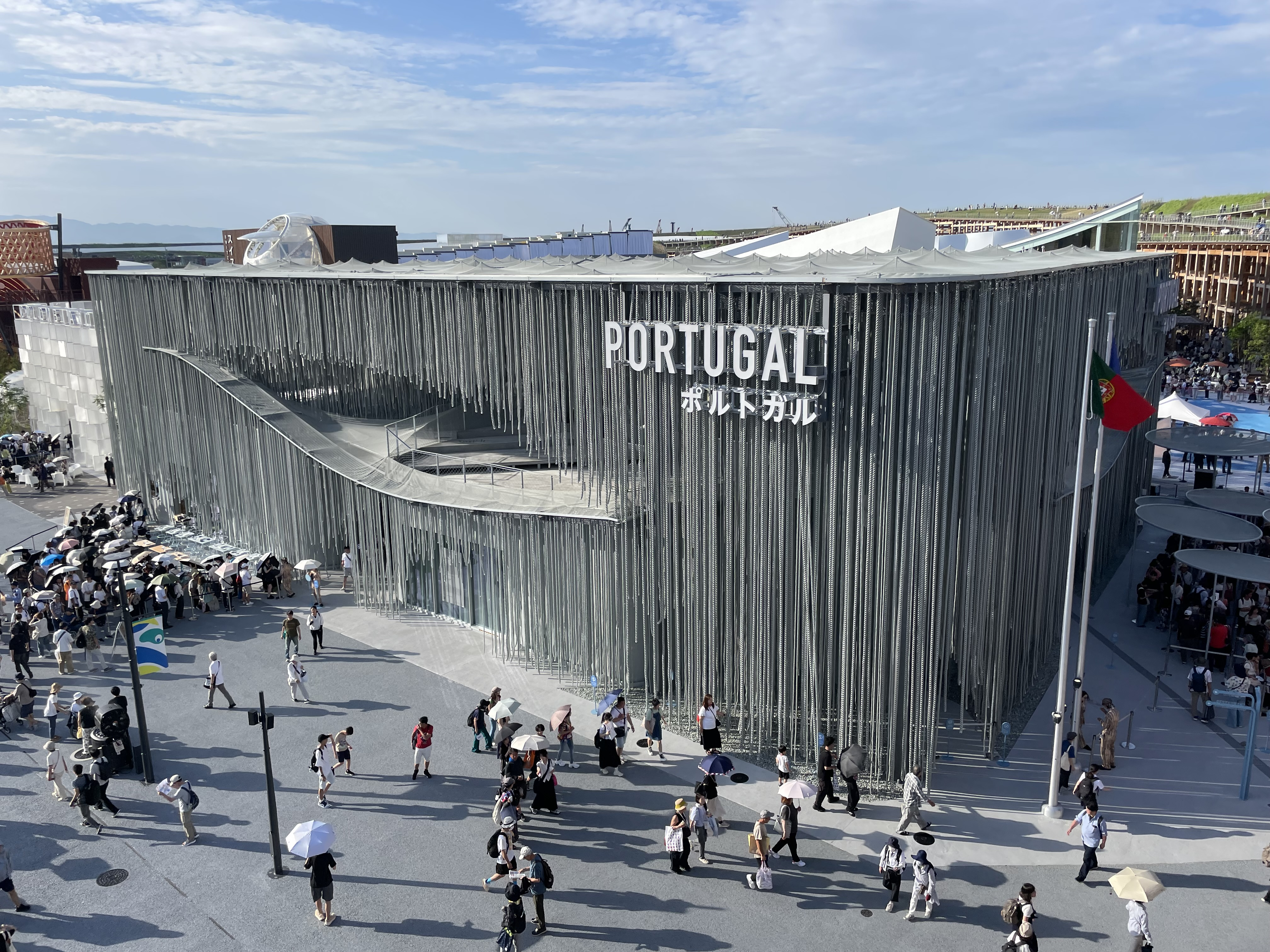
Portugal Pavilion

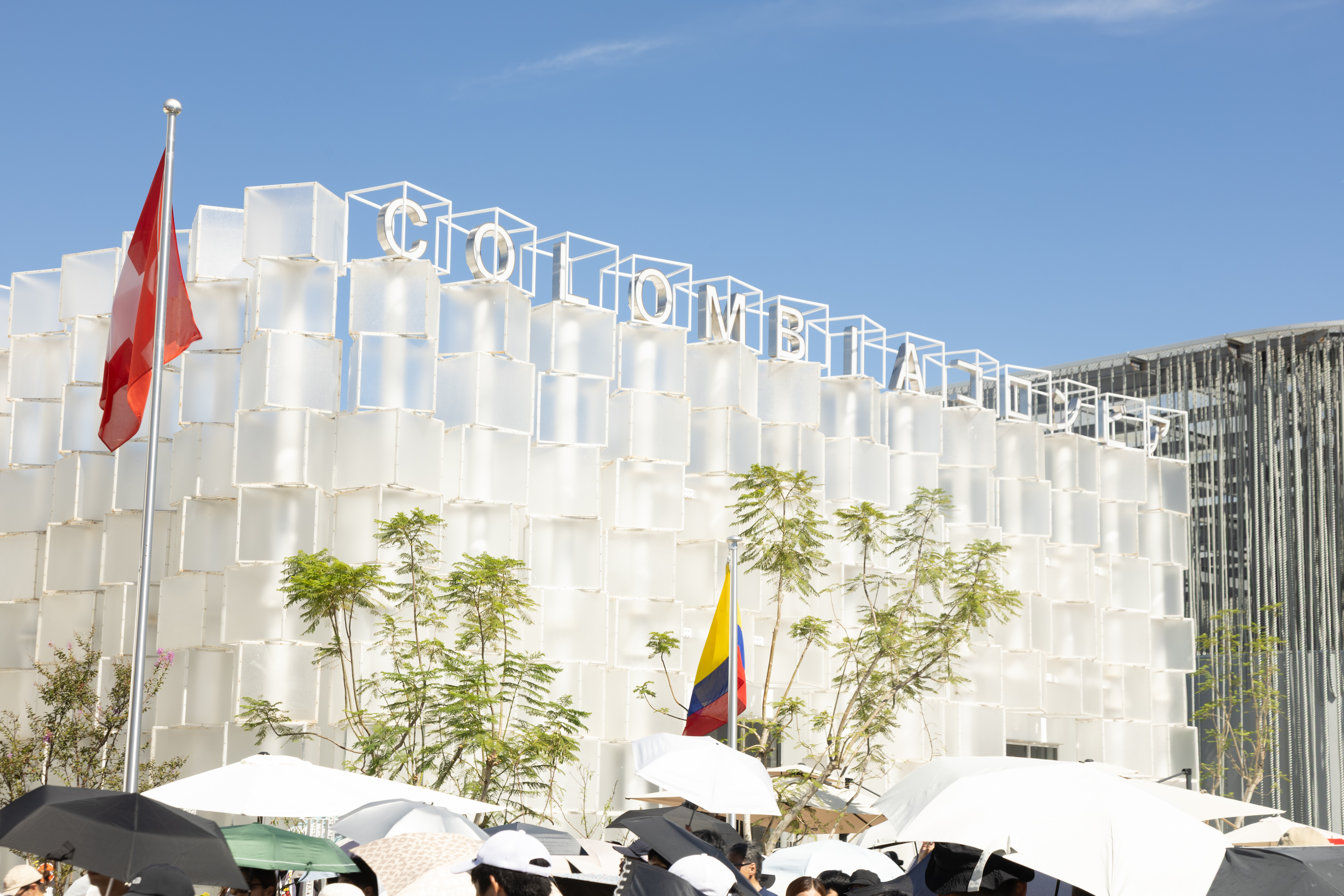
Colombia Pavilion

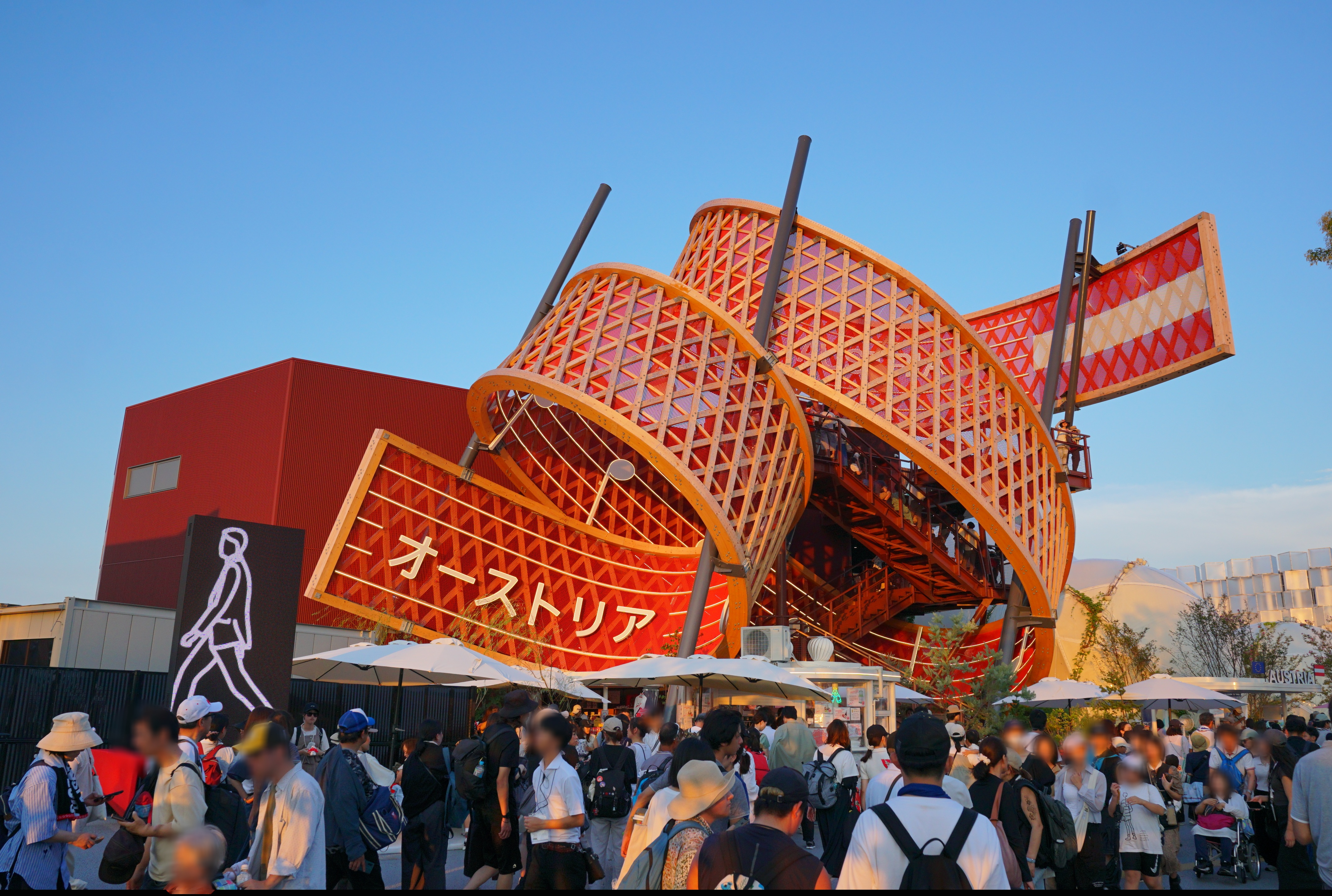
Austria Pavilion

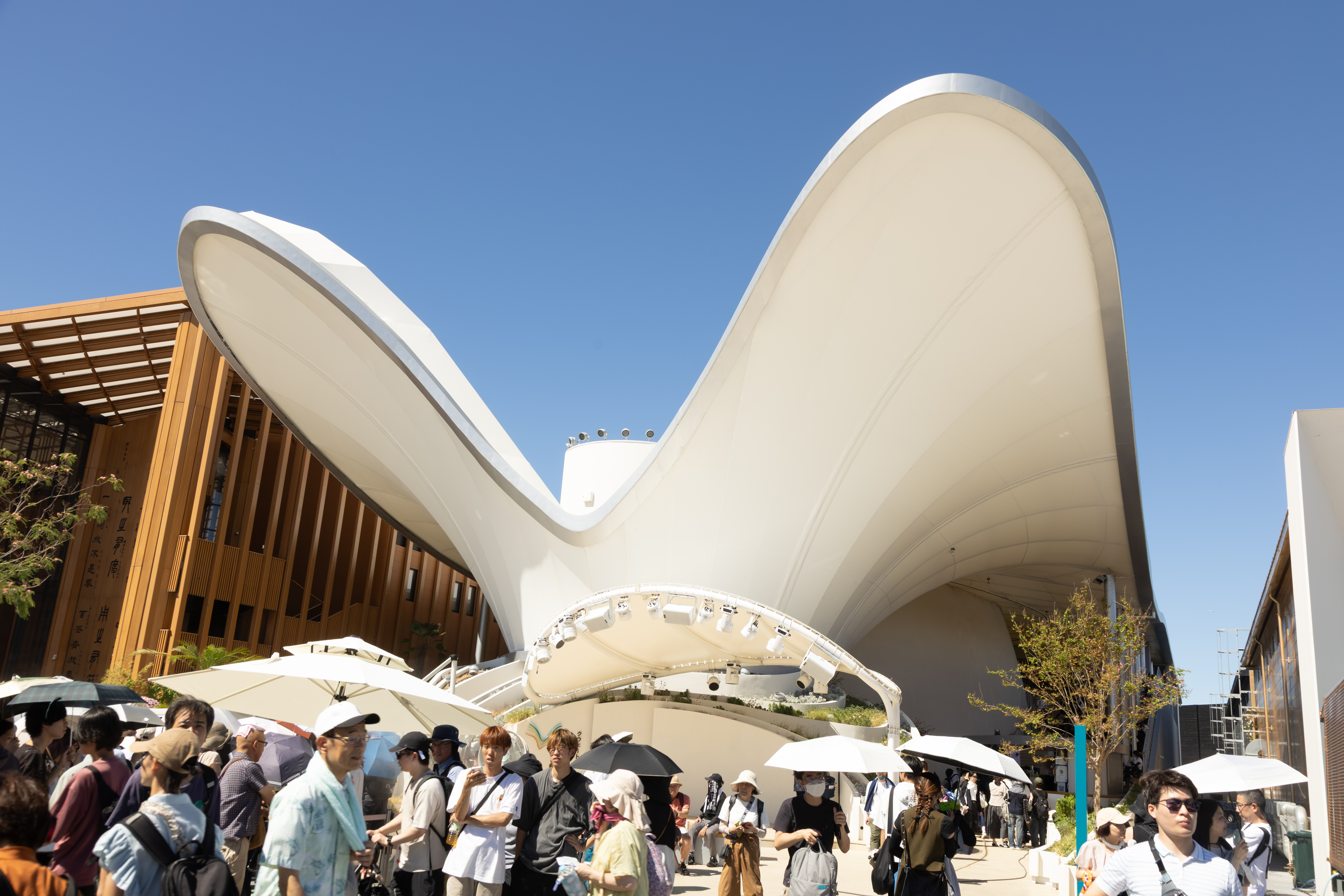
Kuwait Pavilion

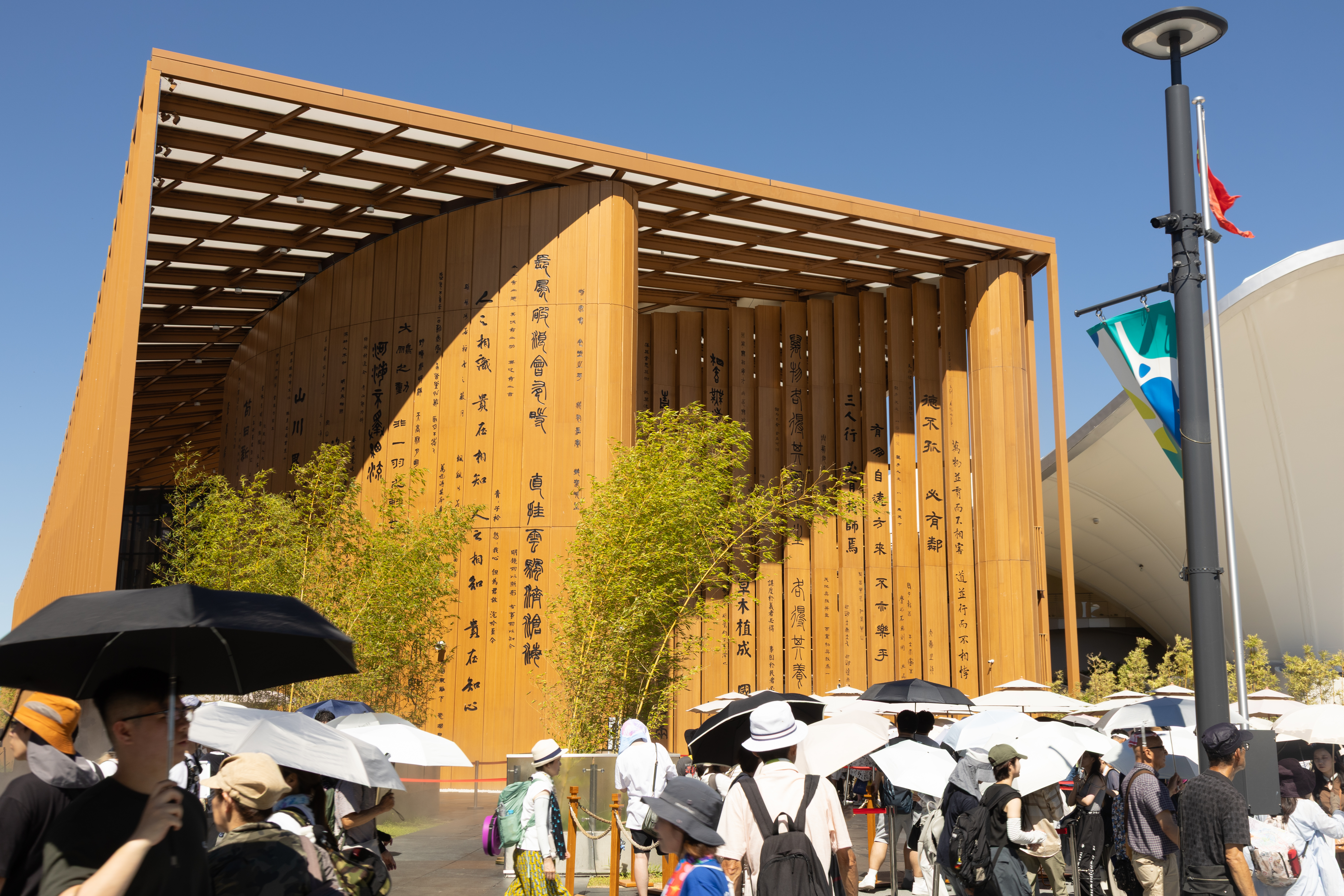
China Pavilion

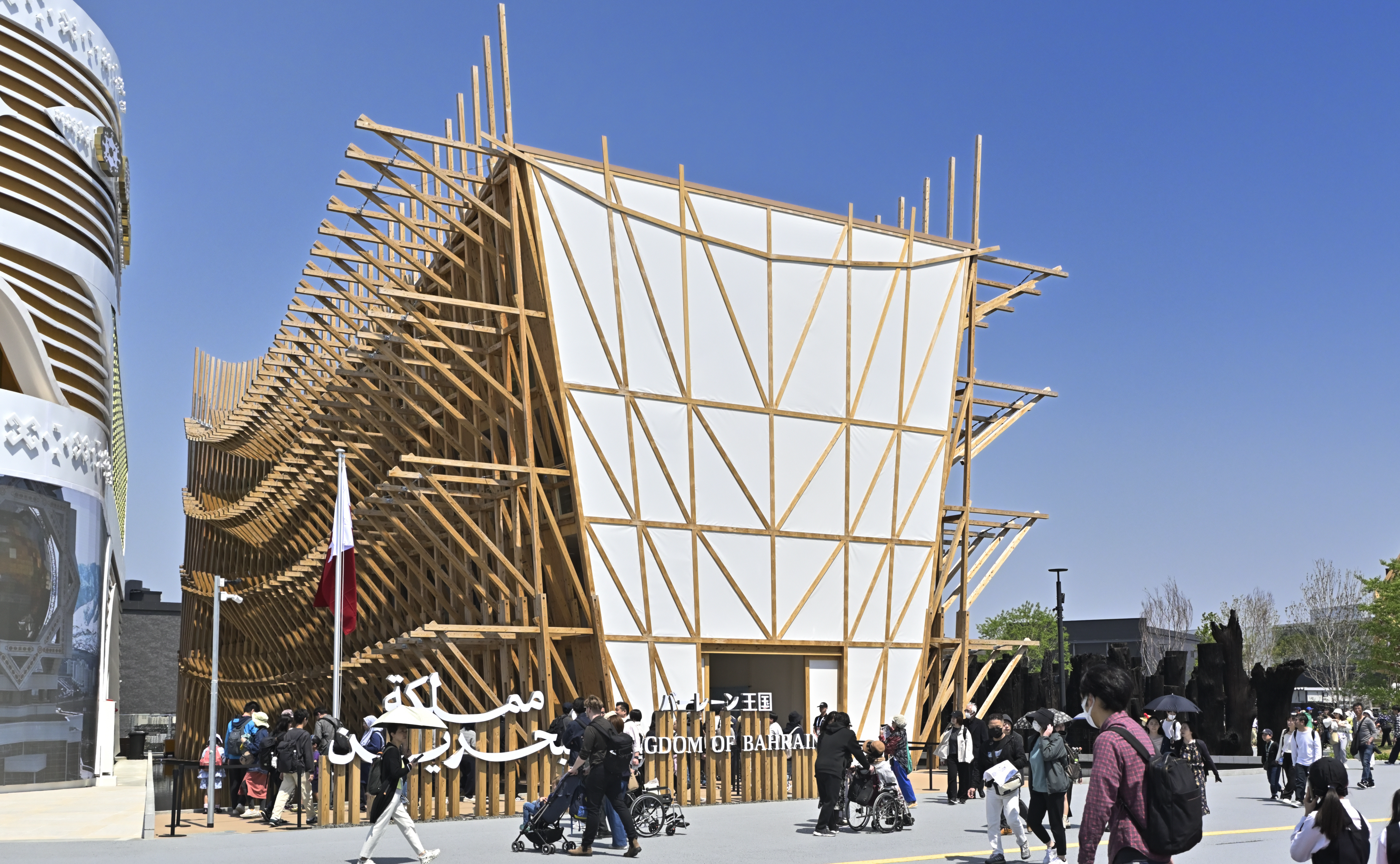
Bahrain Pavilion

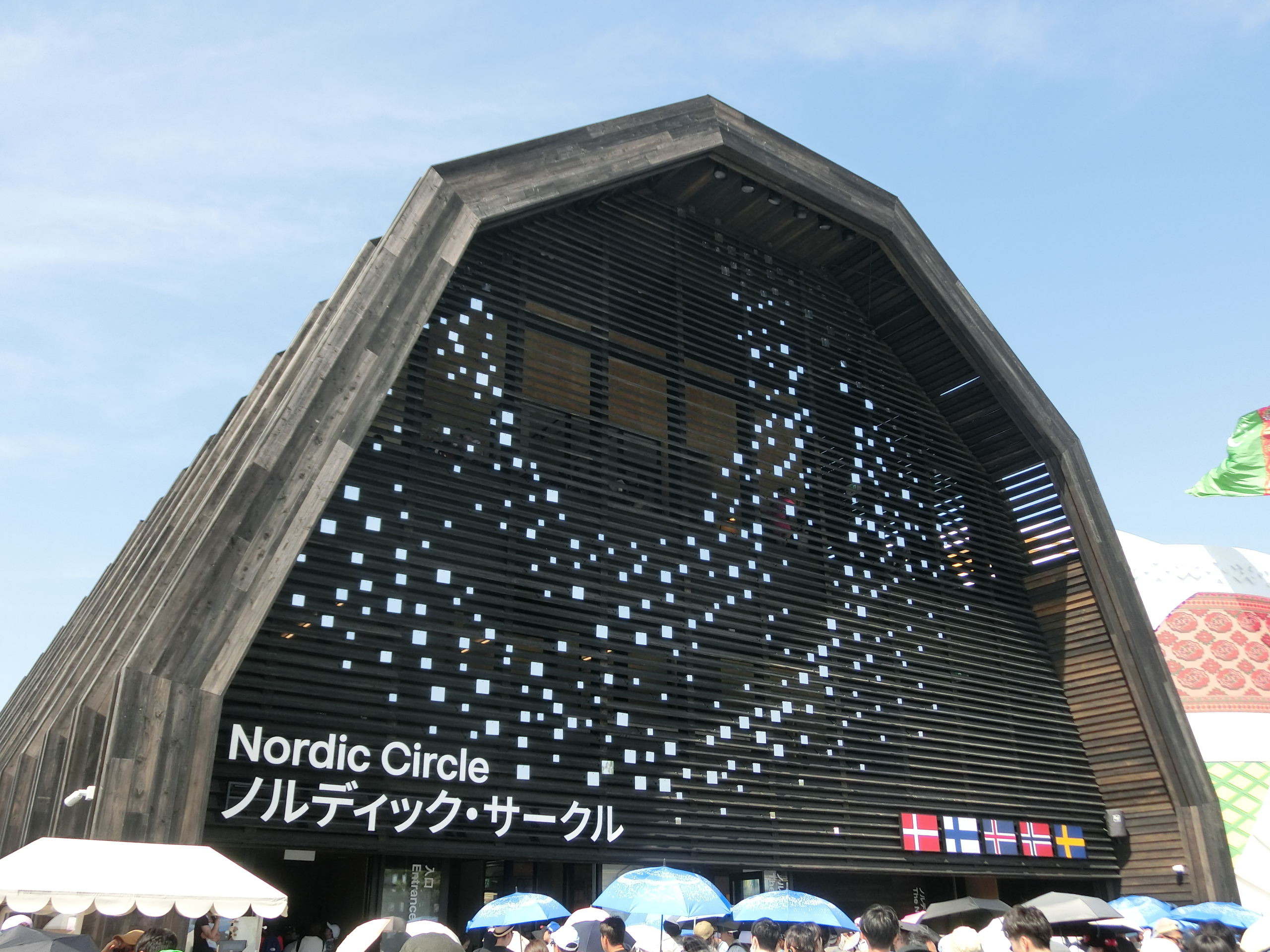
Nordic Pavilion

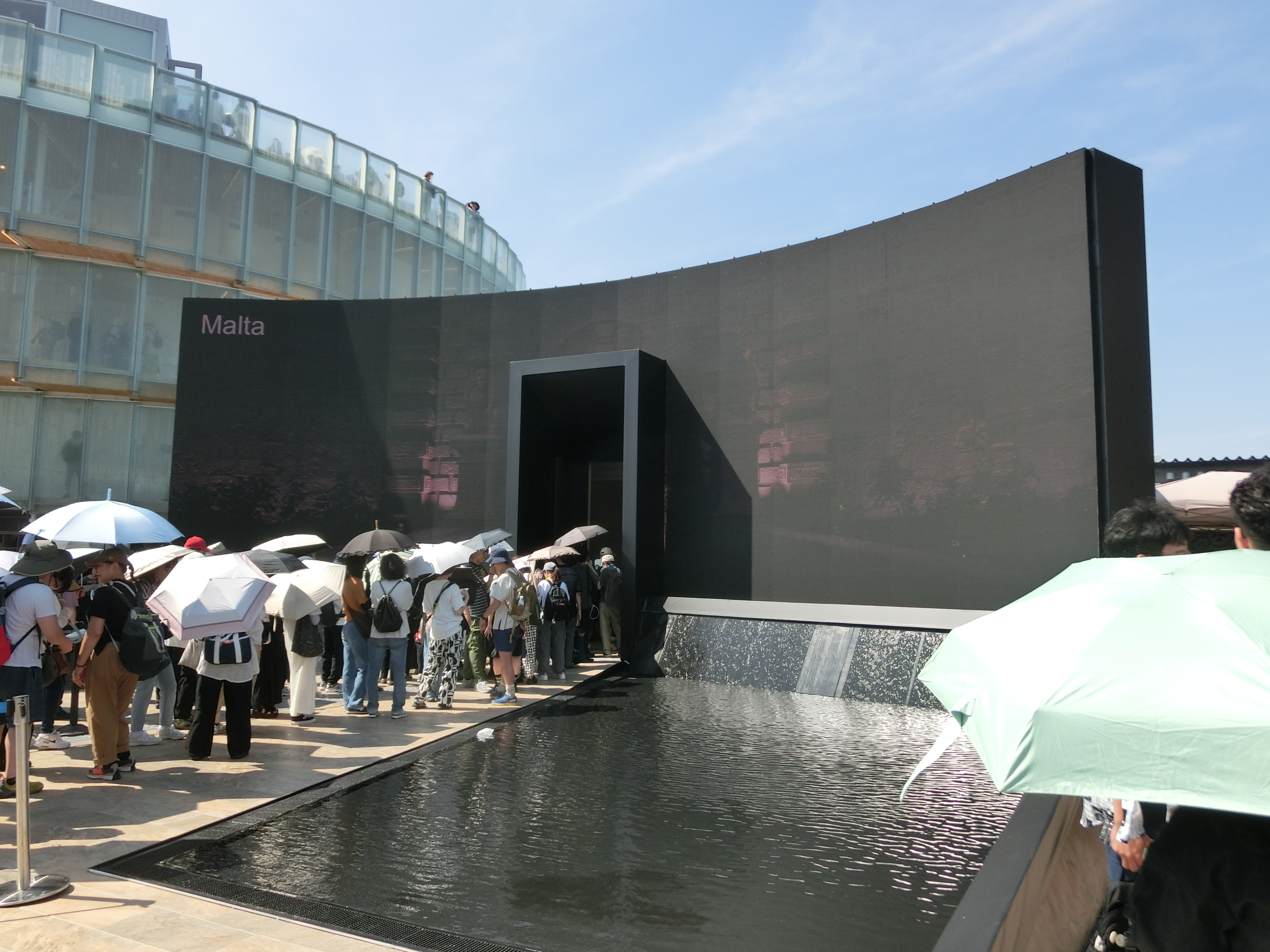
Malta Pavilion

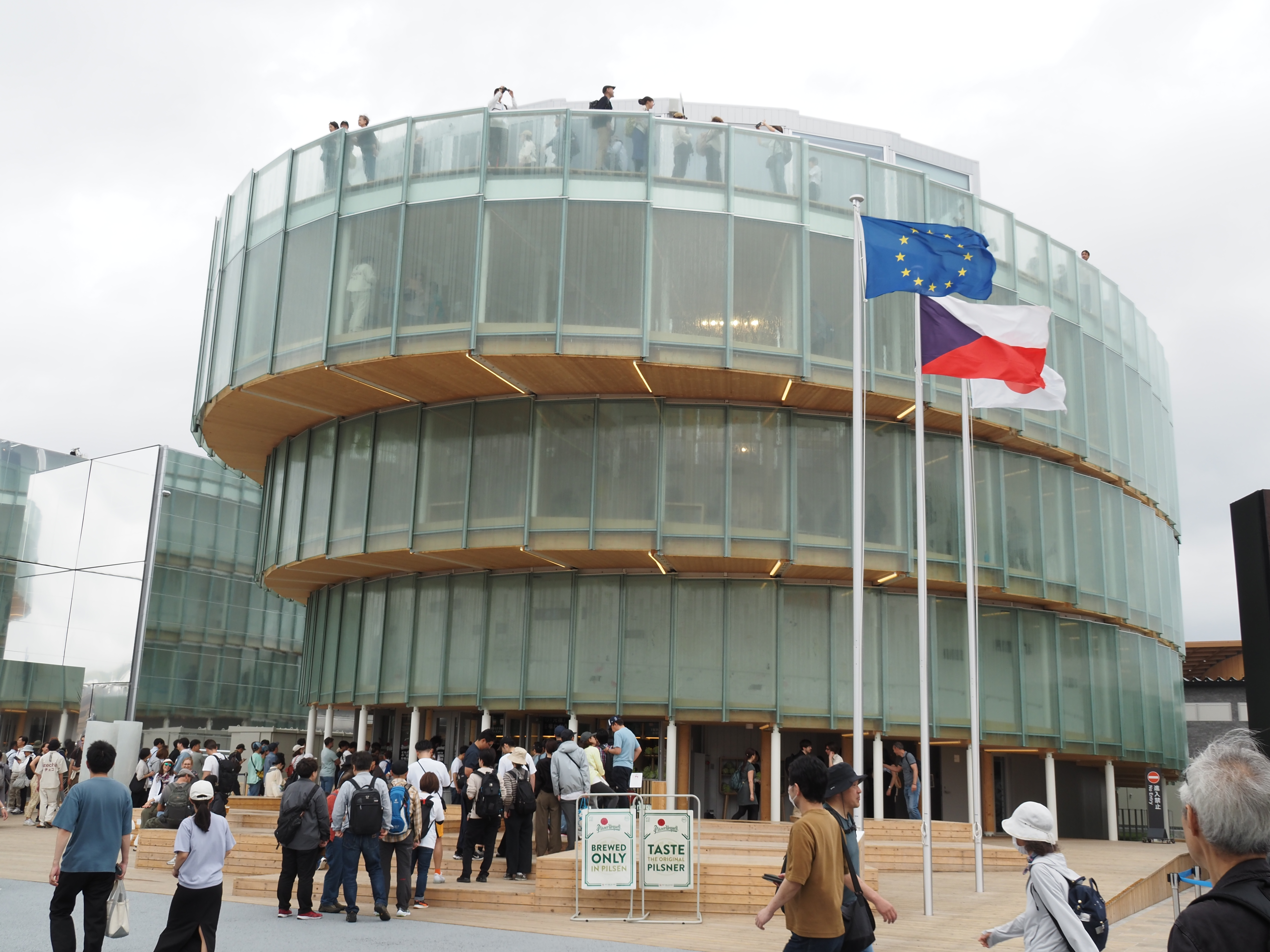
Czech Pavilion

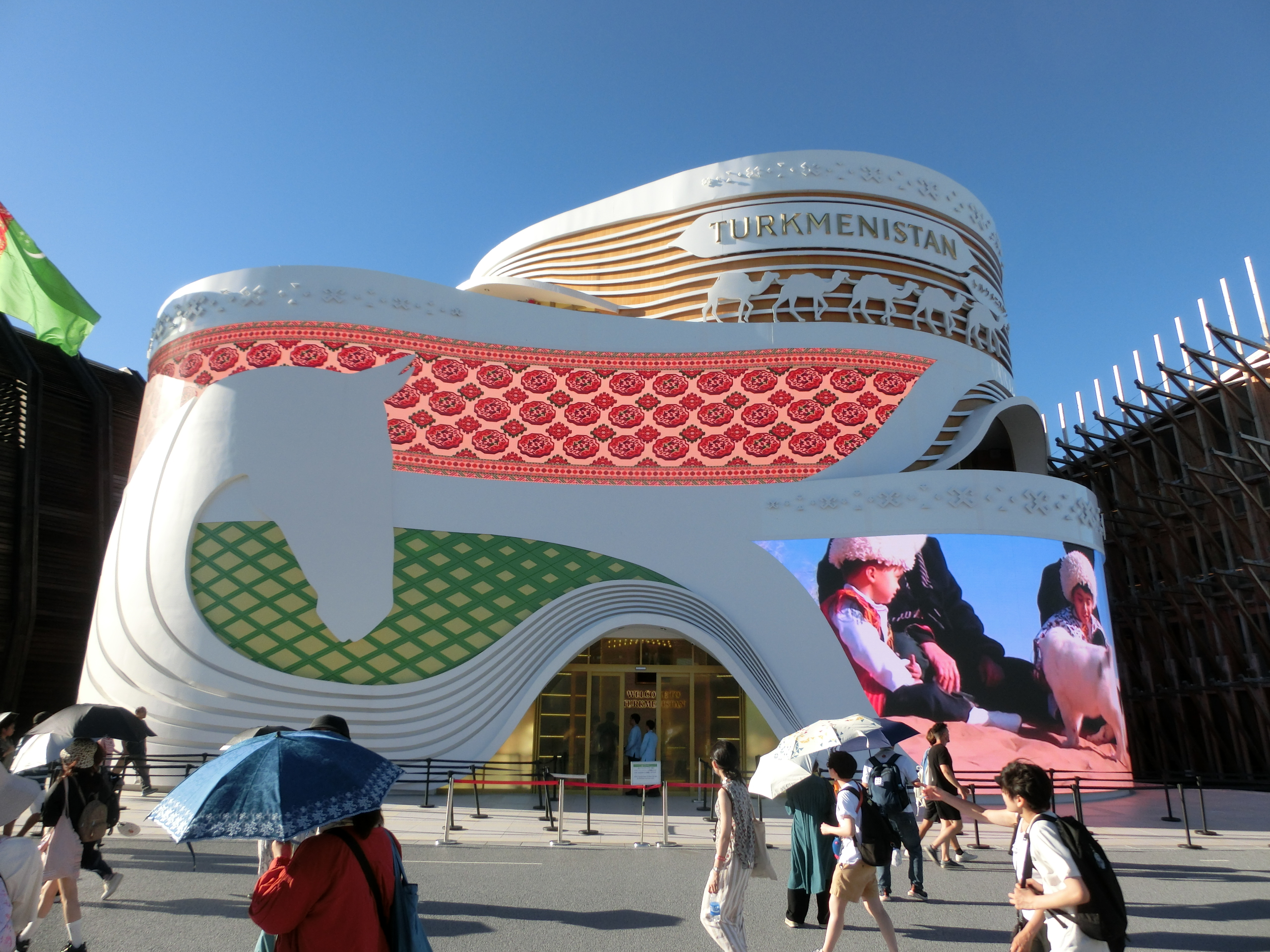
Turkmenistan Pavilion

=== Saving Lives Zone ===
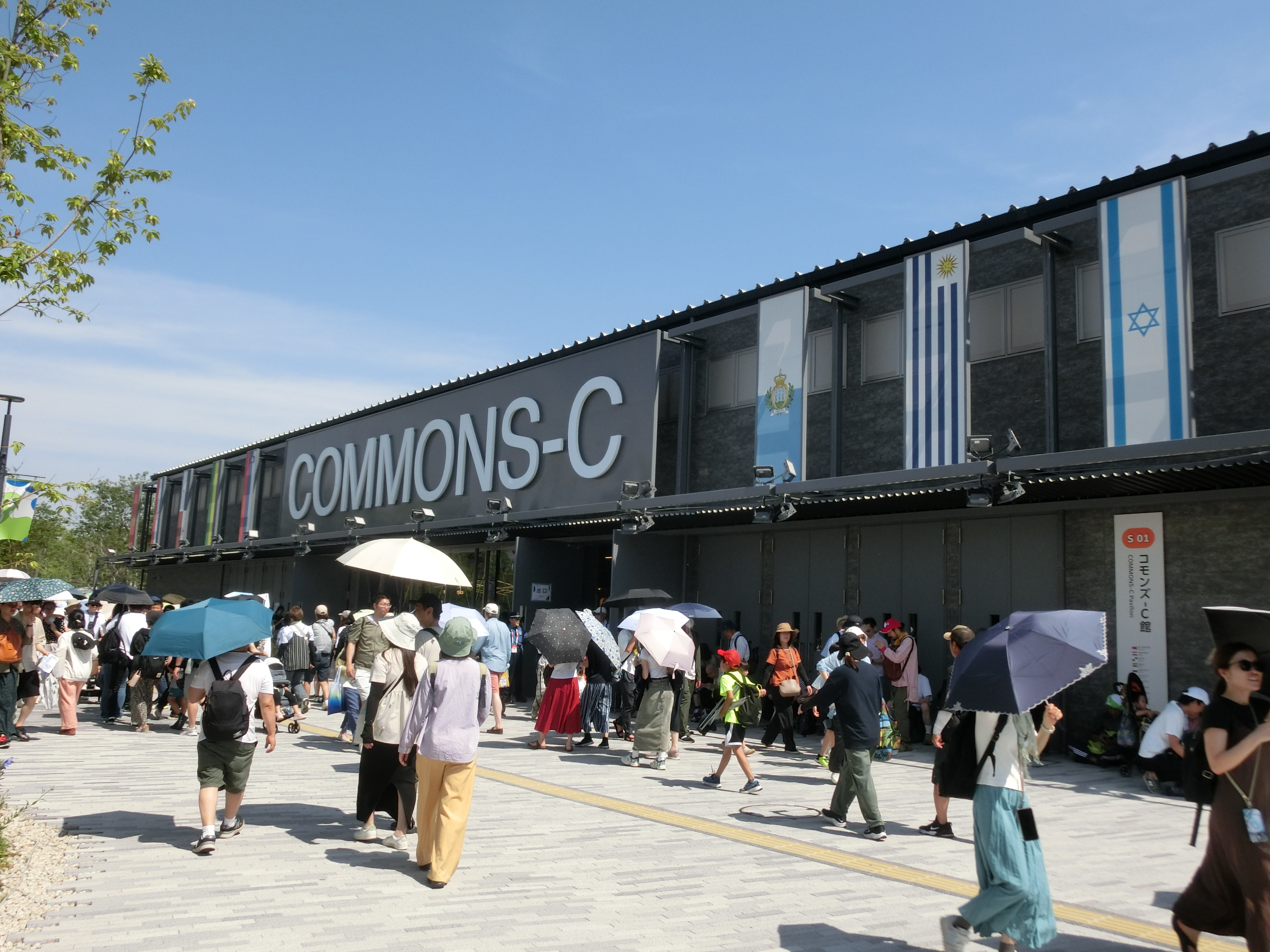
Commons C Pavilion

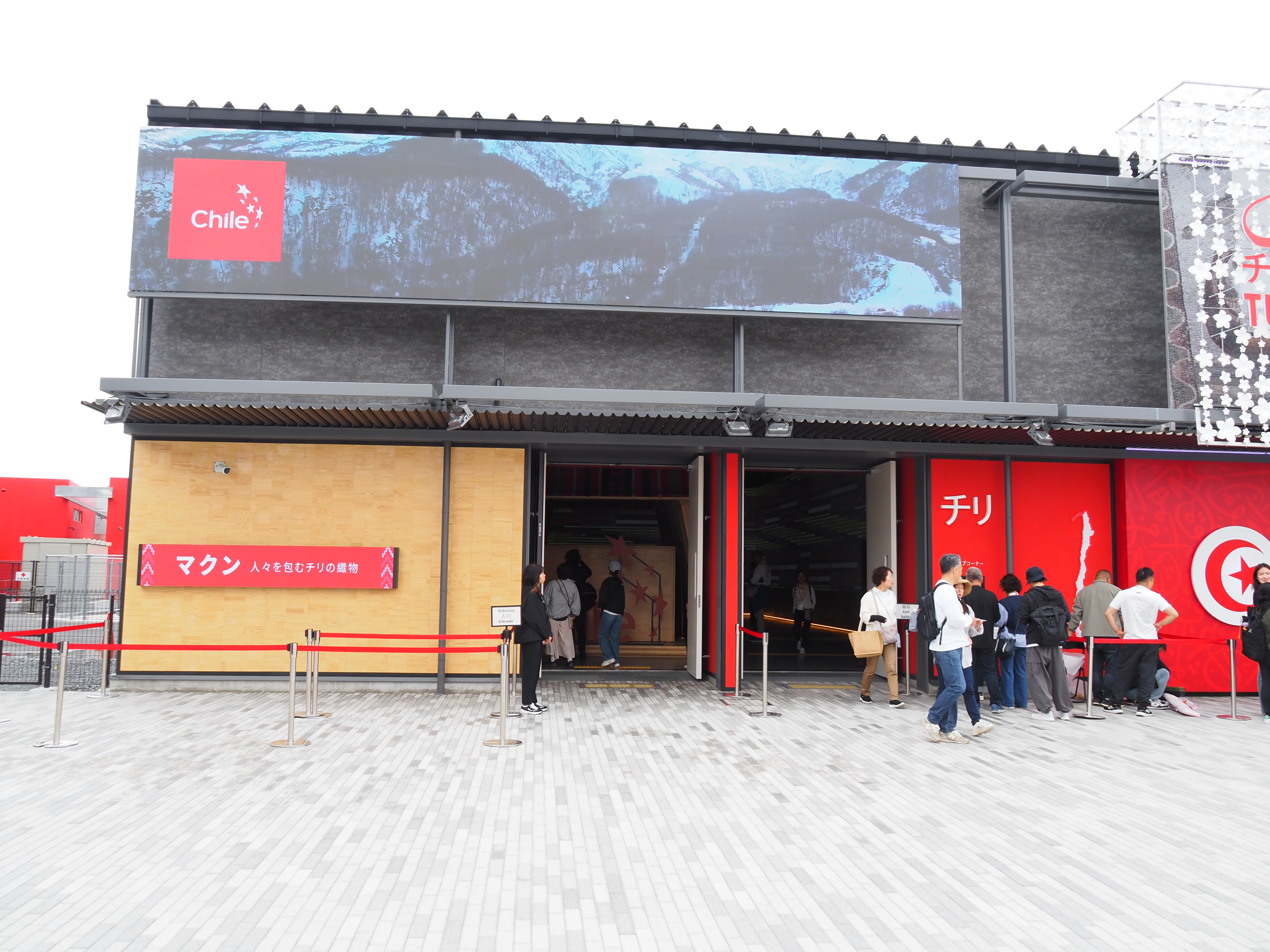
Chile Pavilion

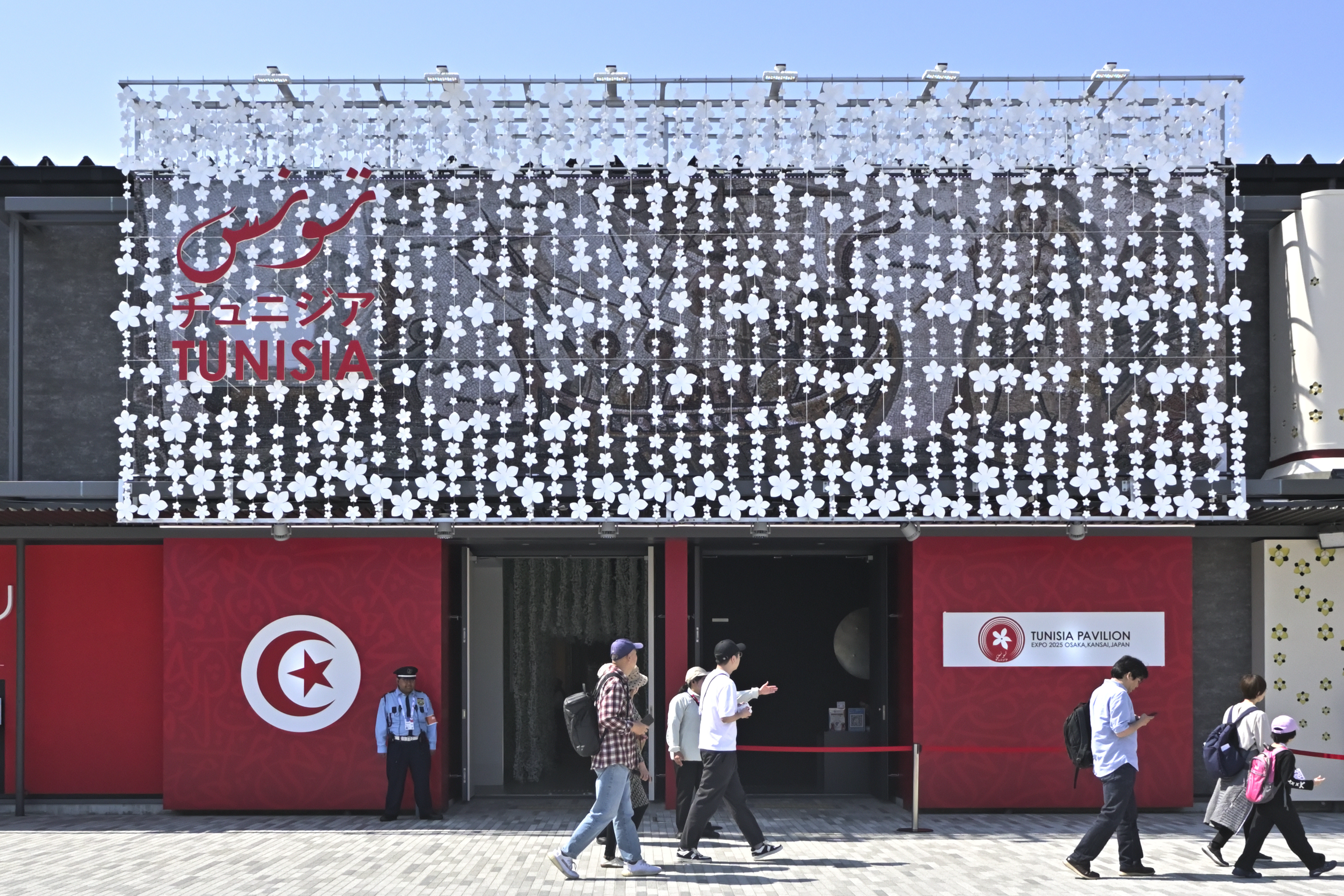
Tunisia Pavilion

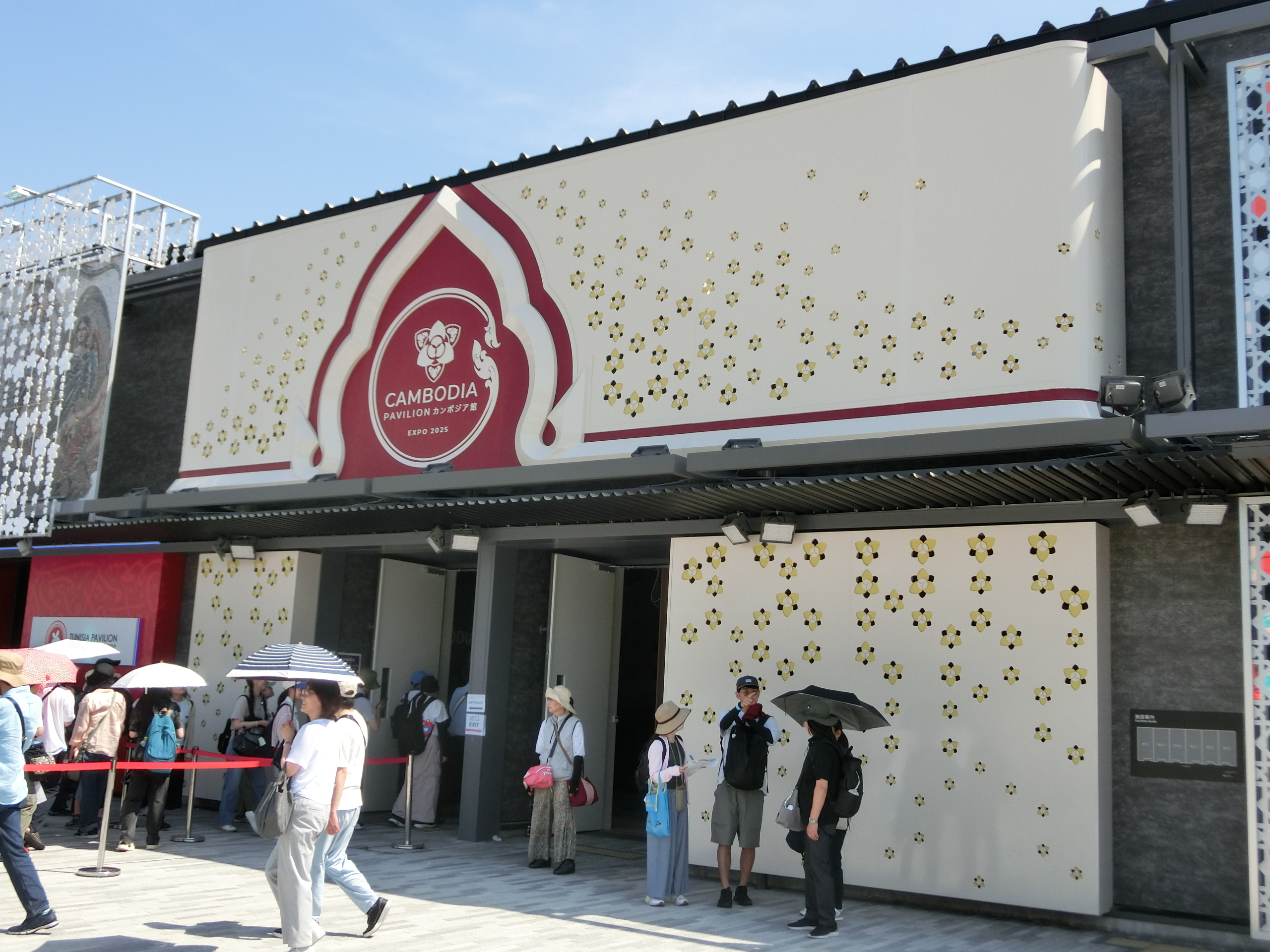
Cambodia Pavilion

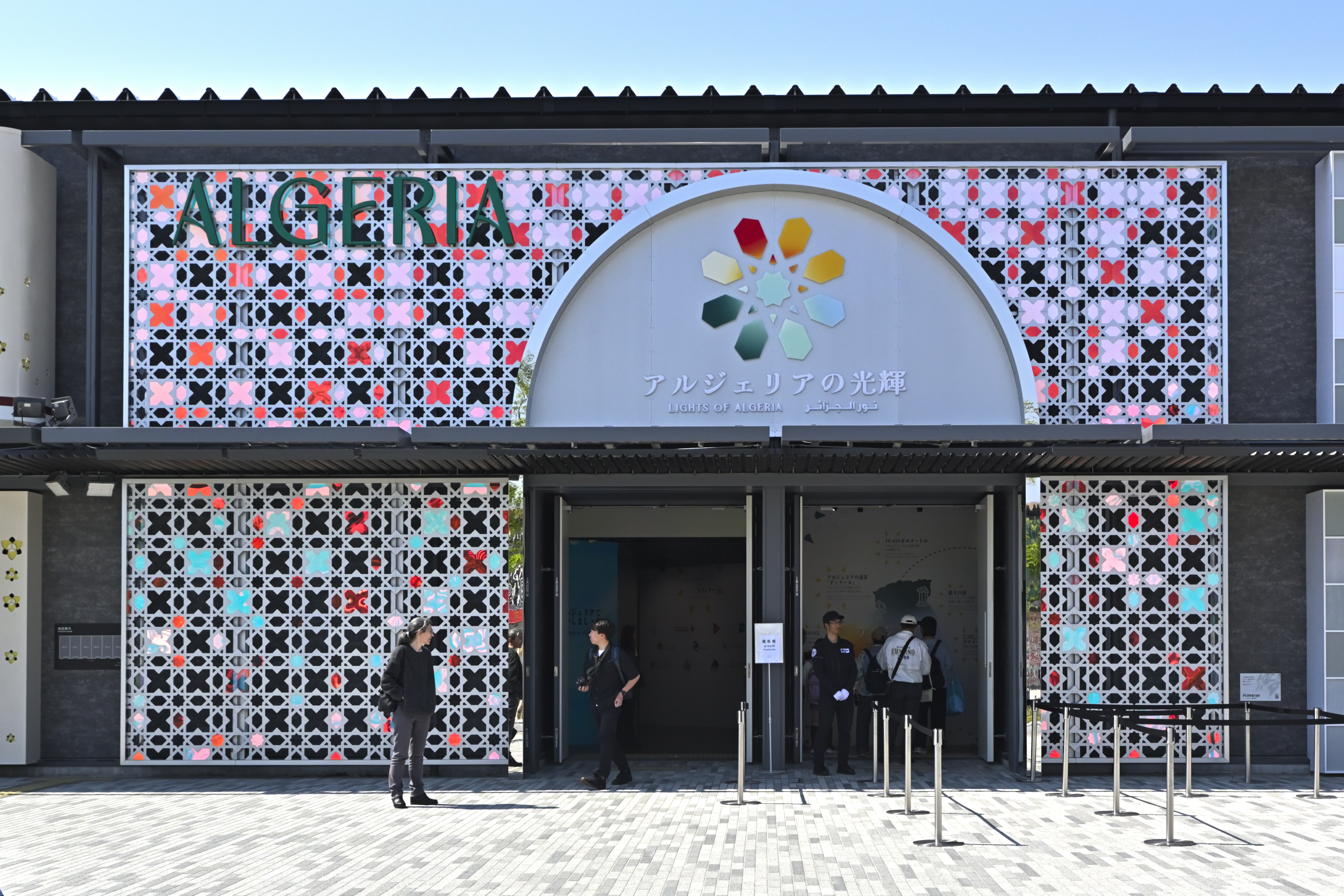
Algeria Pavilion

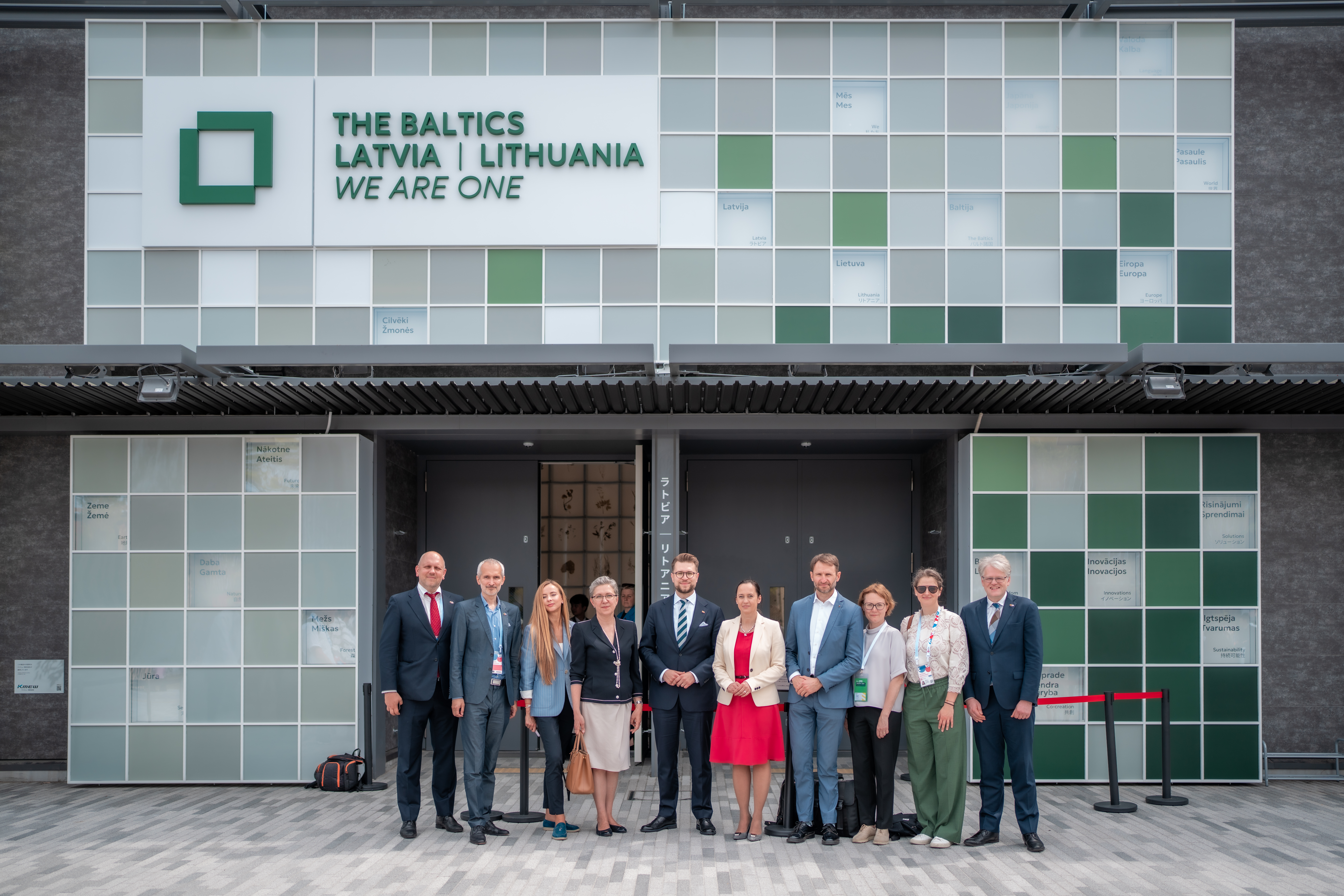
Baltic Pavilion

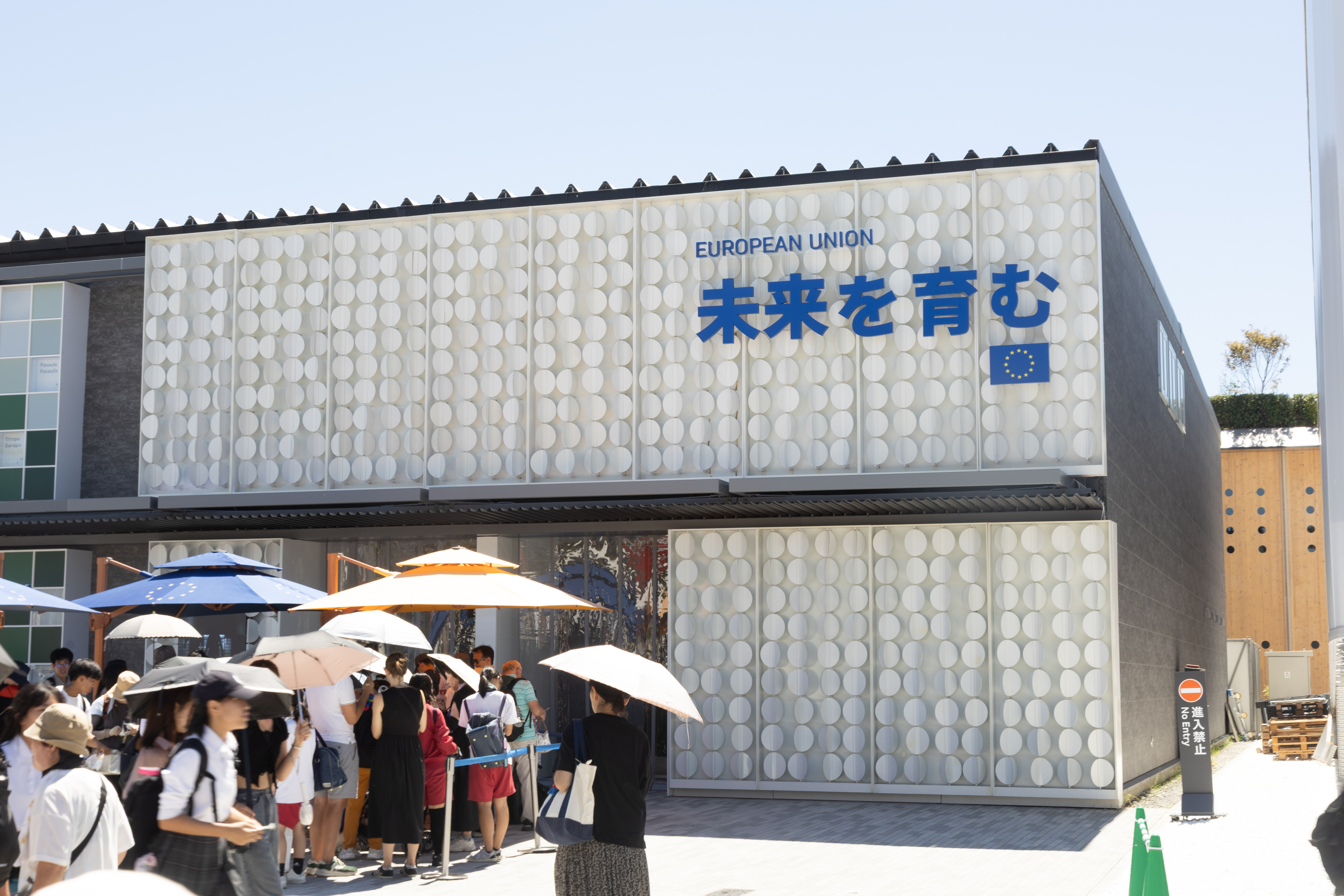
EU Pavilion

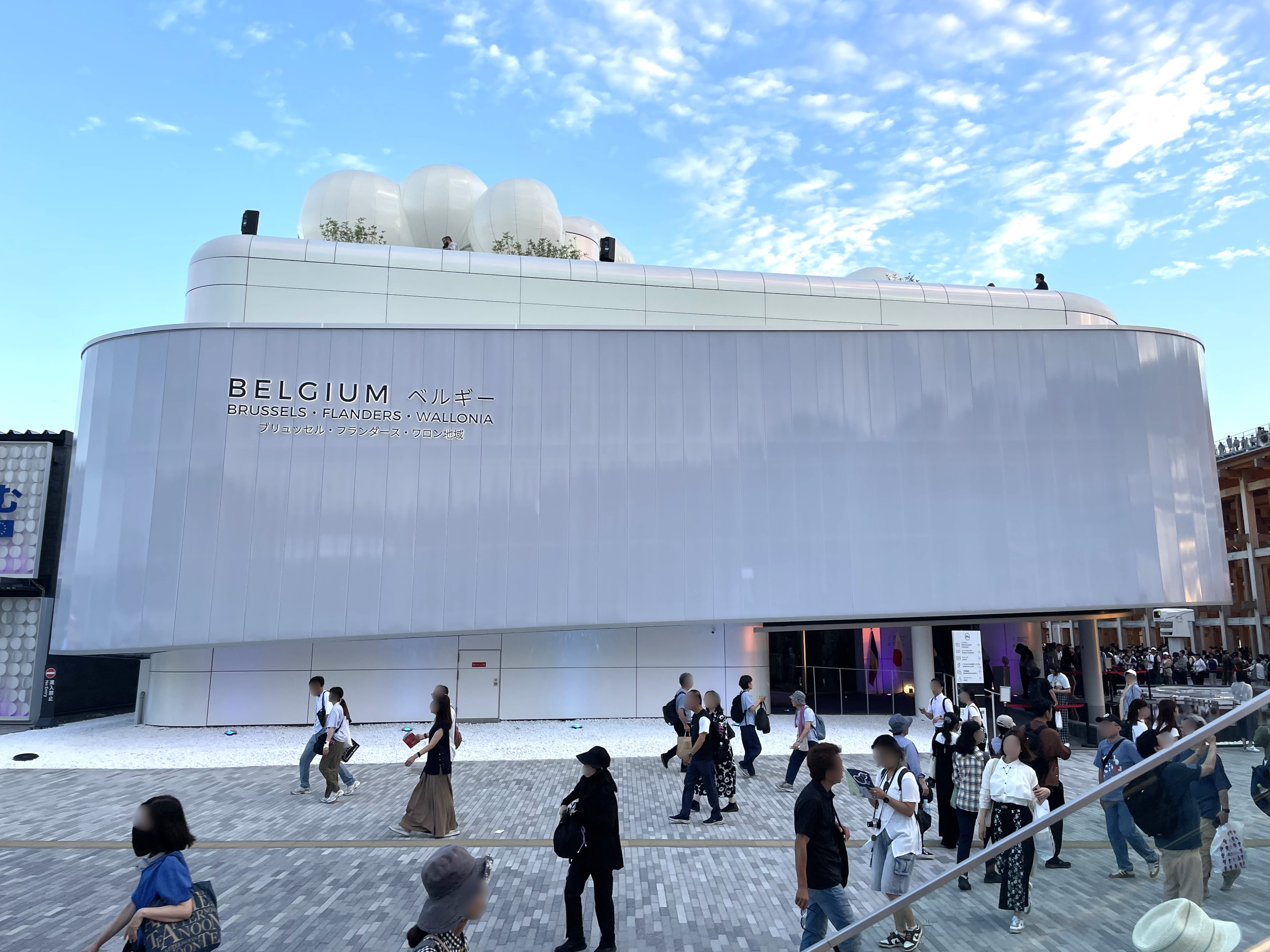
Belgium Pavilion

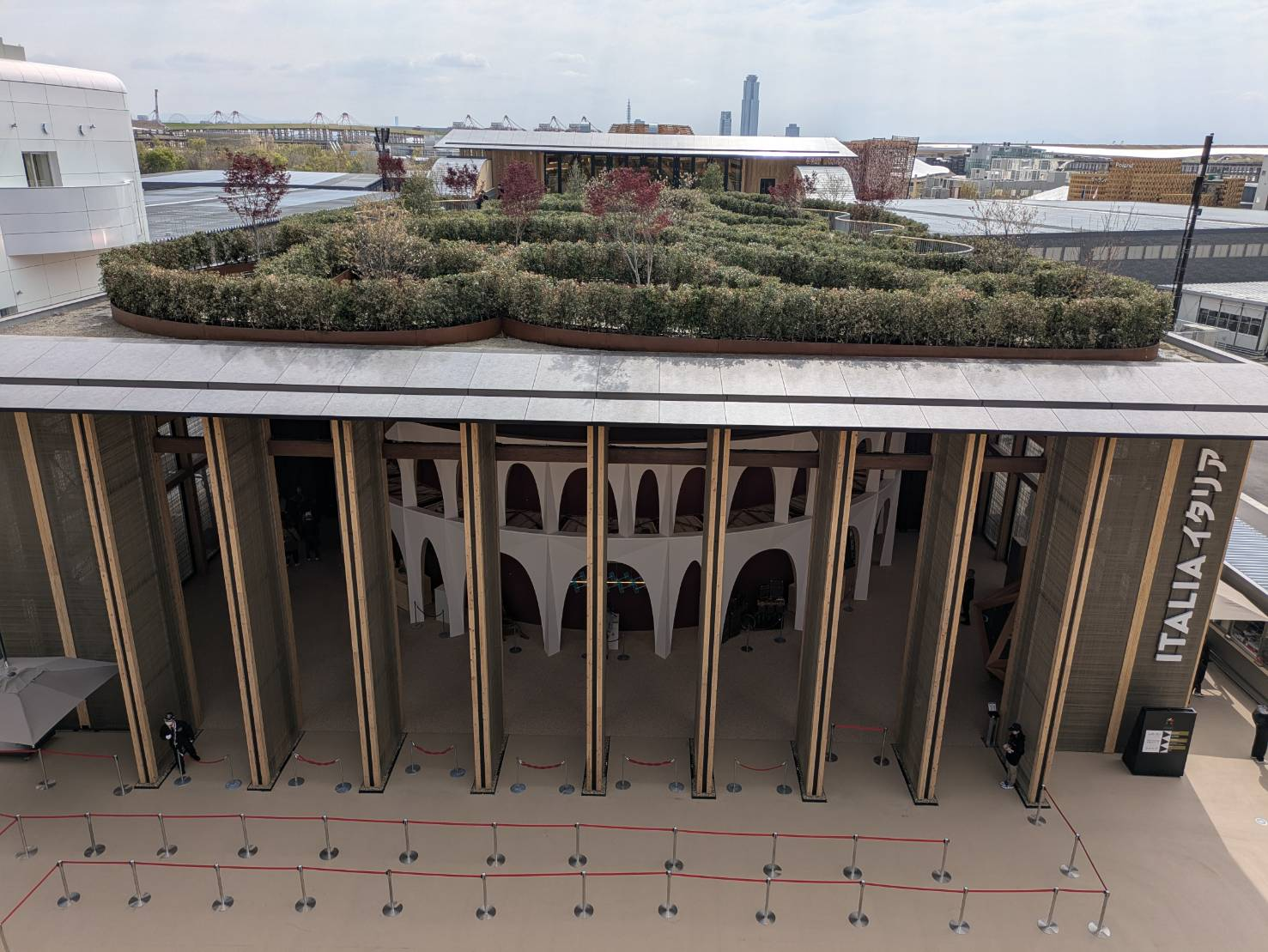
Italy Pavilion

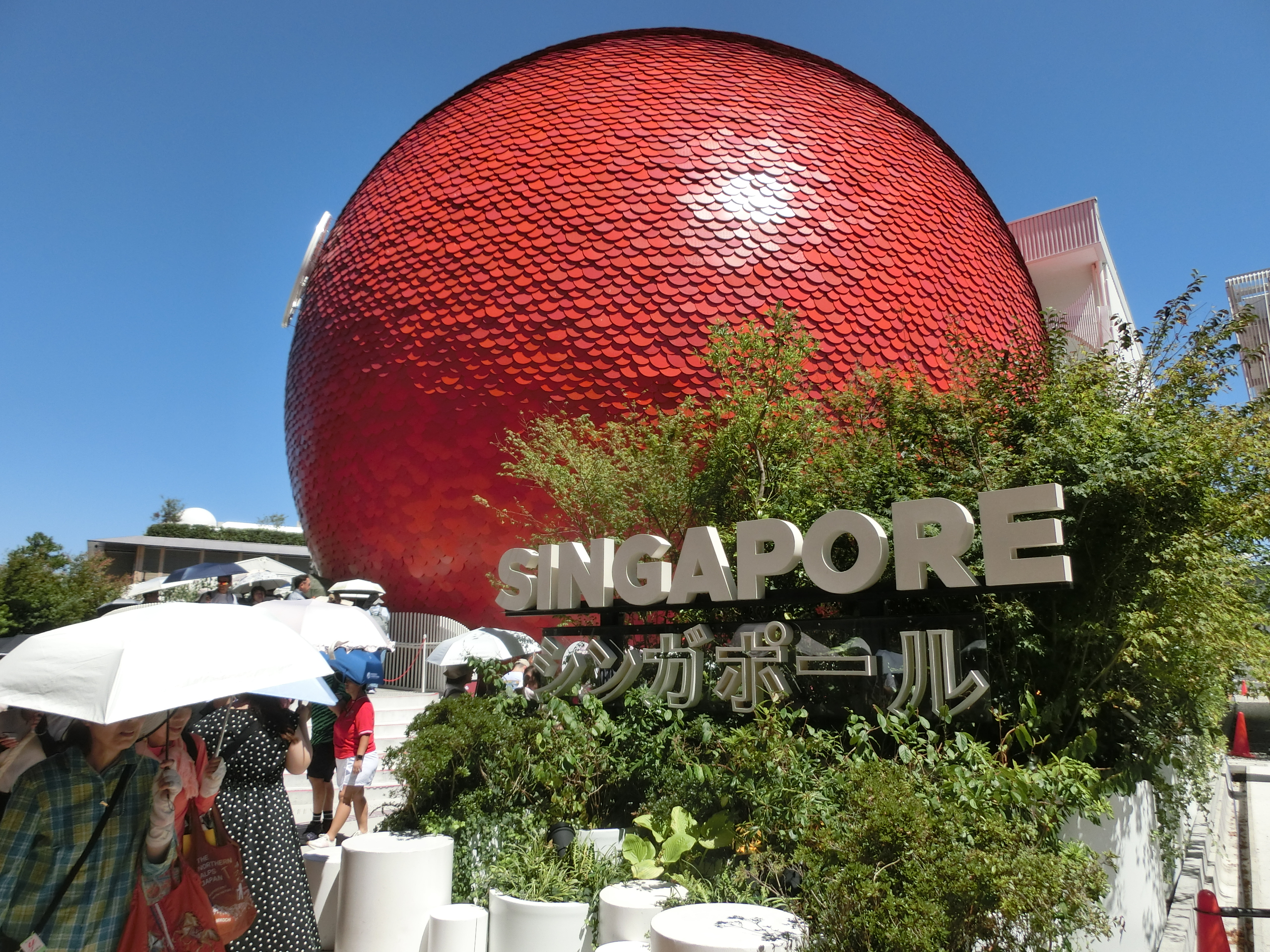
Singapore Pavilion

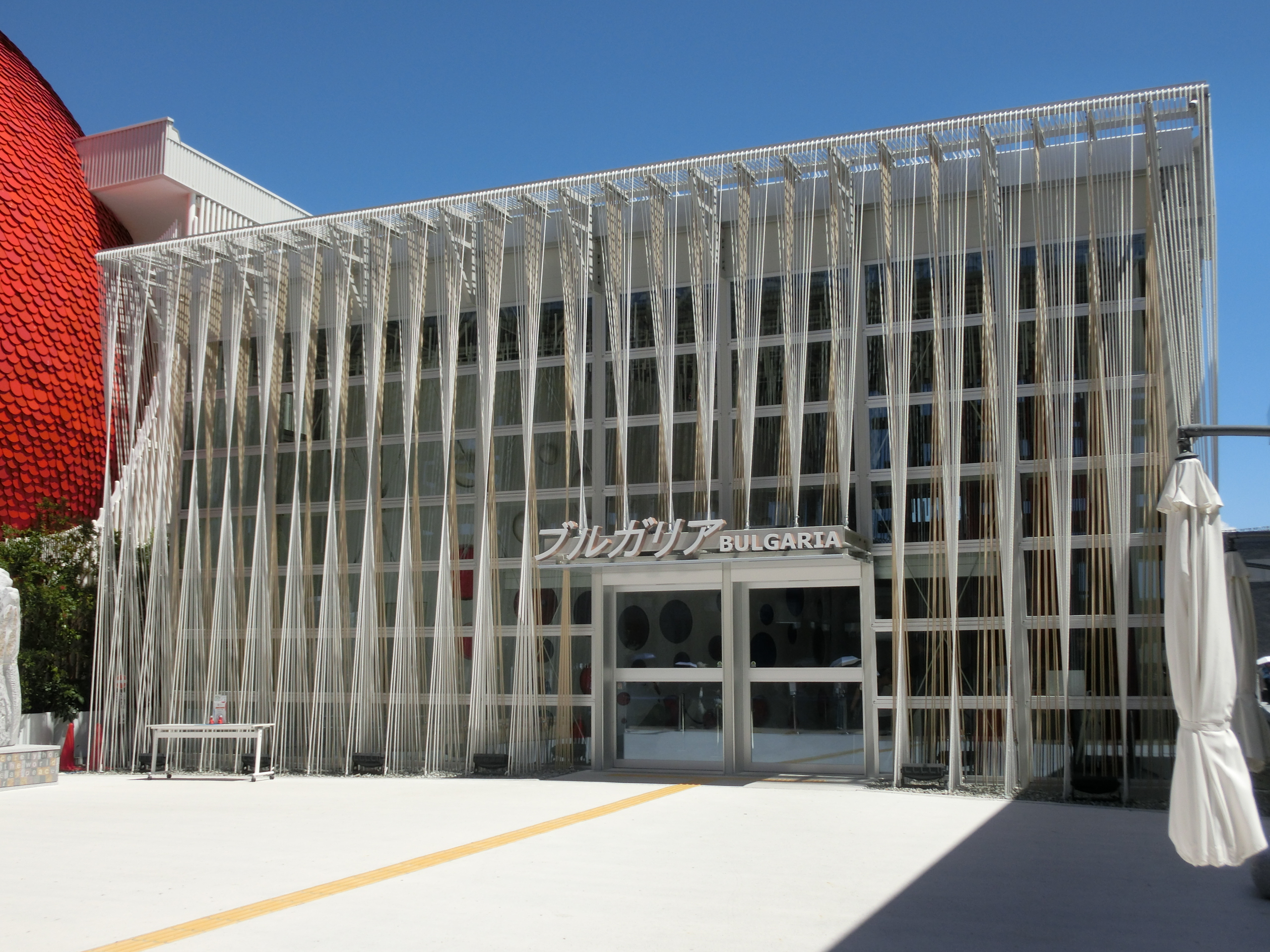
Bulgaria Pavilion

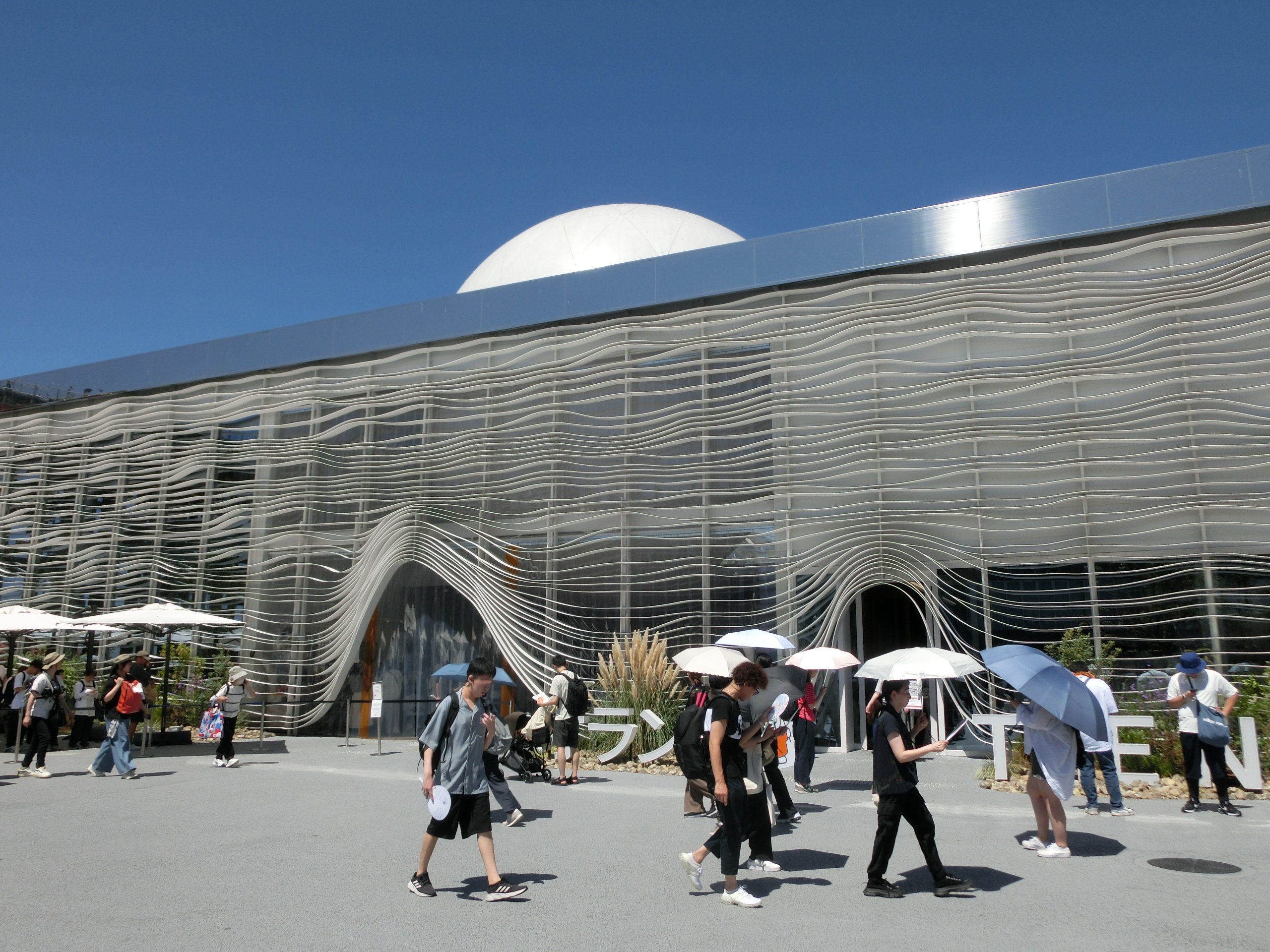
Netherlands Pavilion

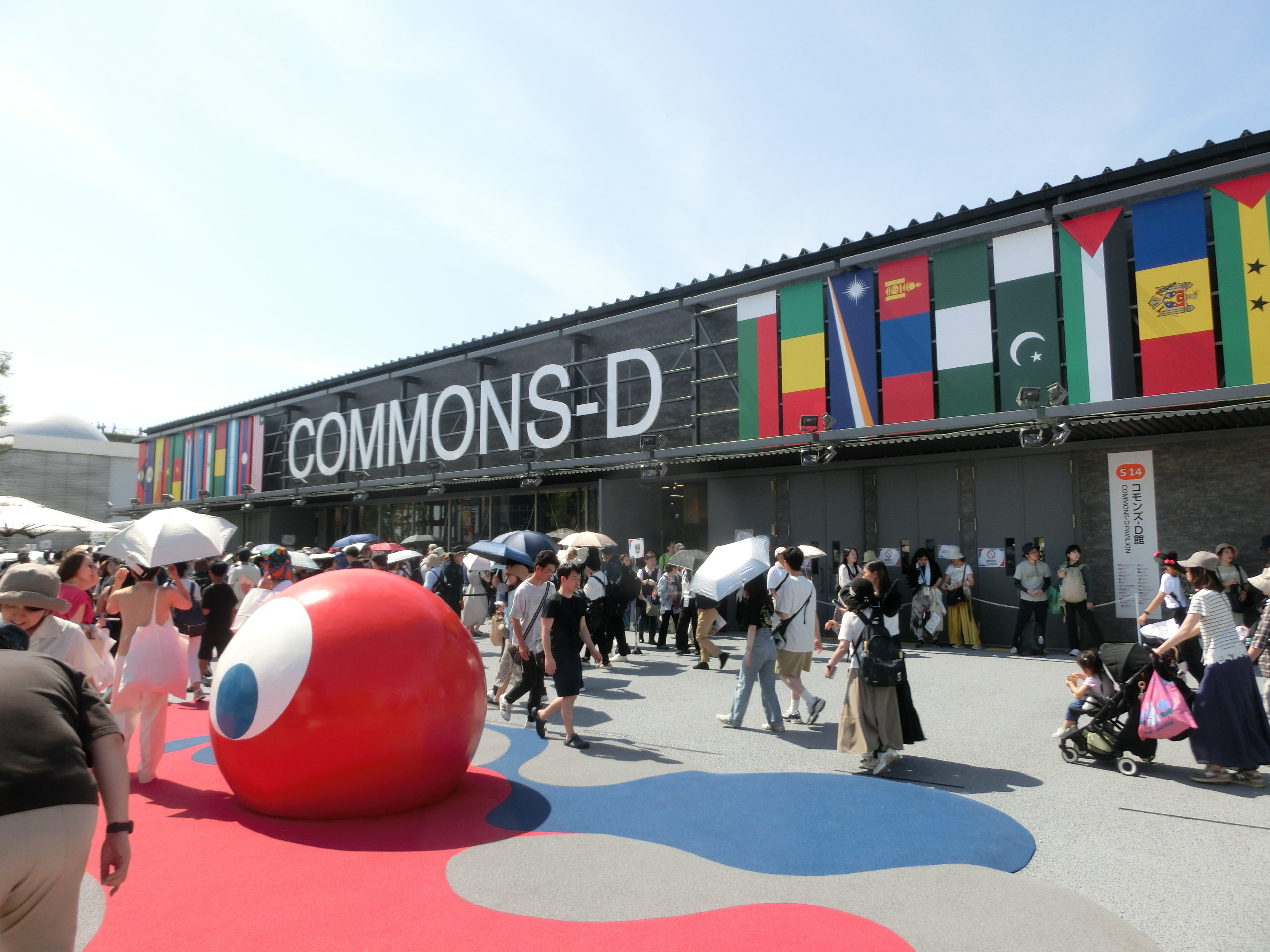
Commons D Pavilion

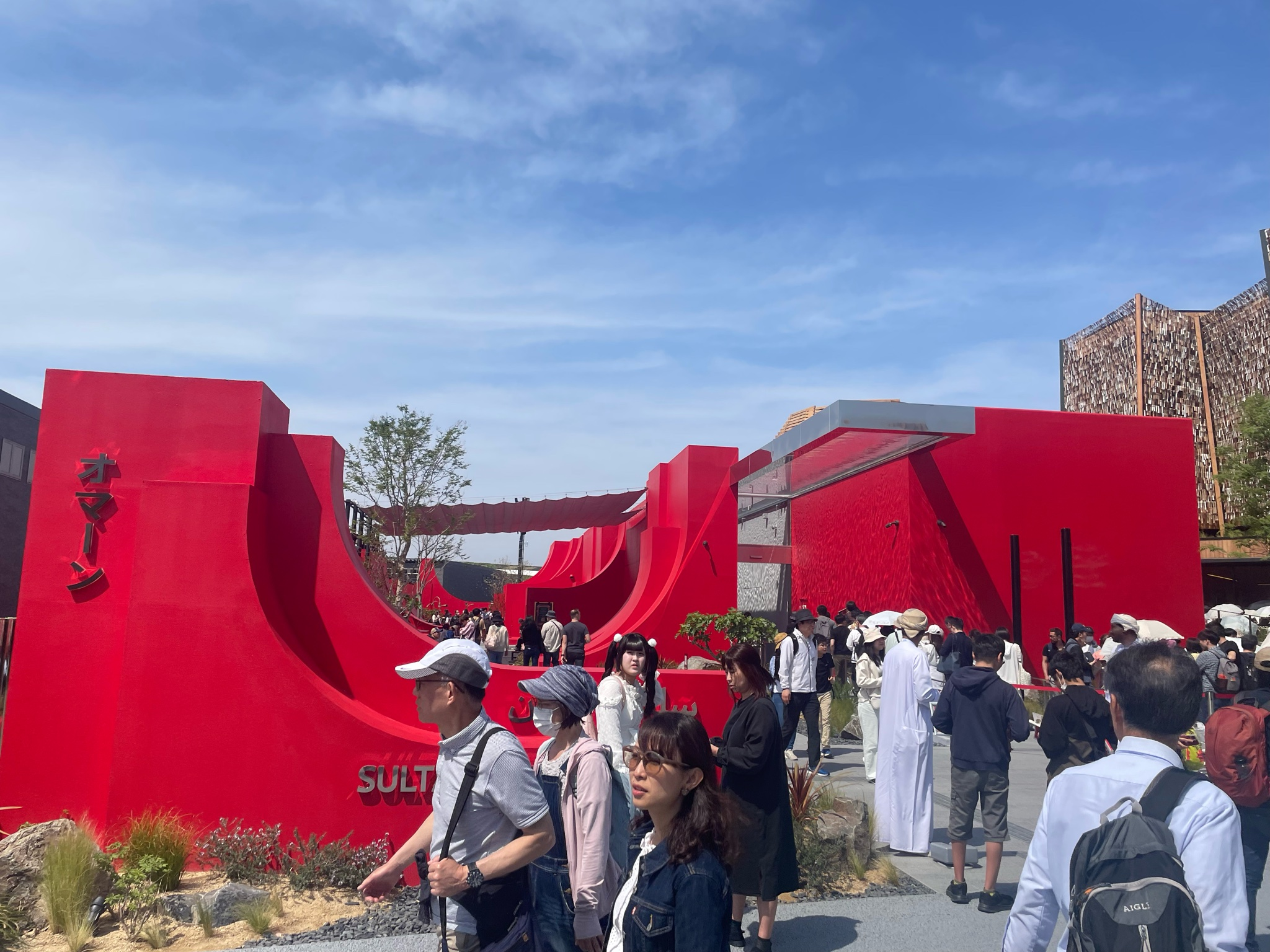
Oman Pavilion

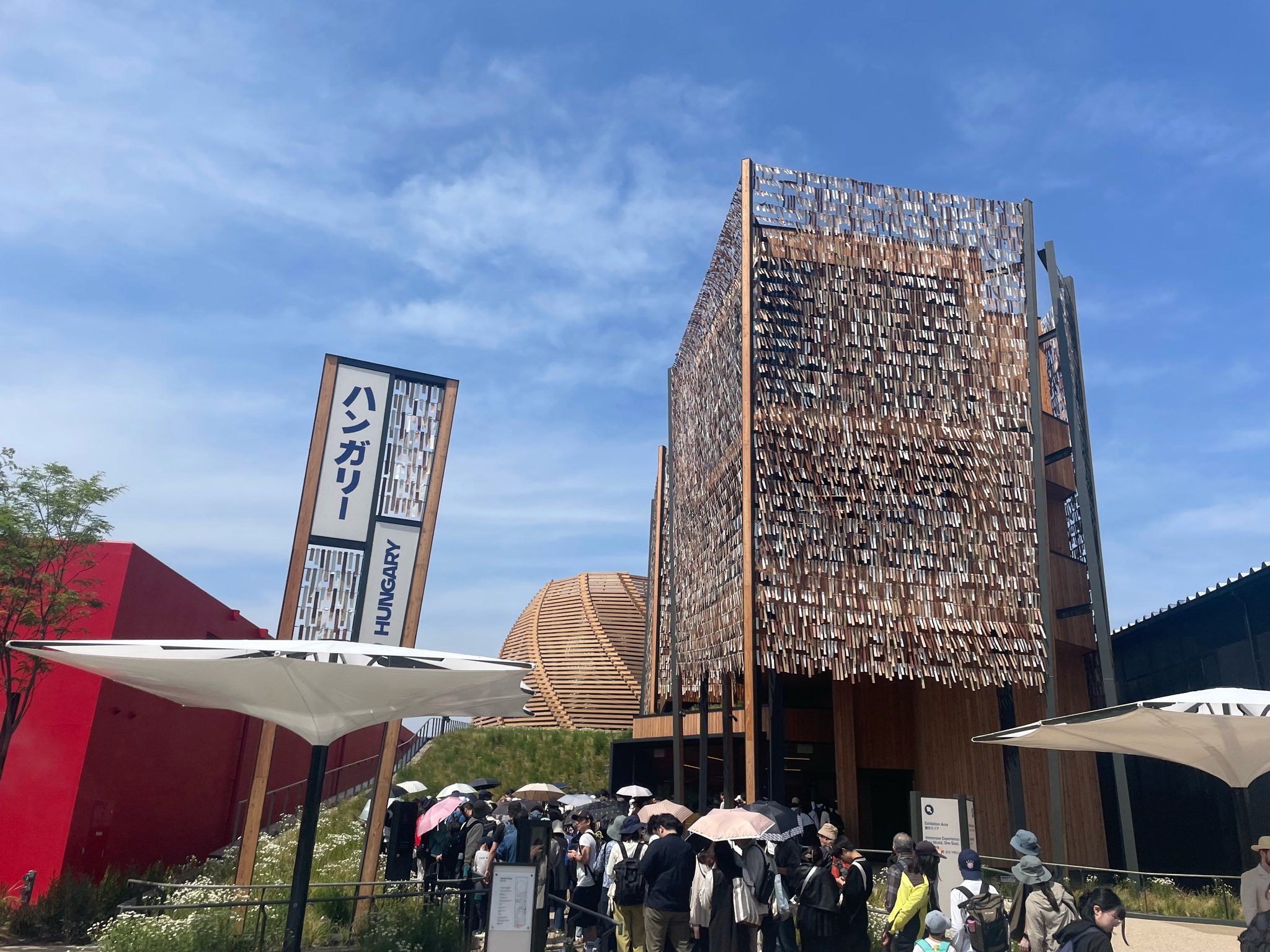
Hungary Pavilion

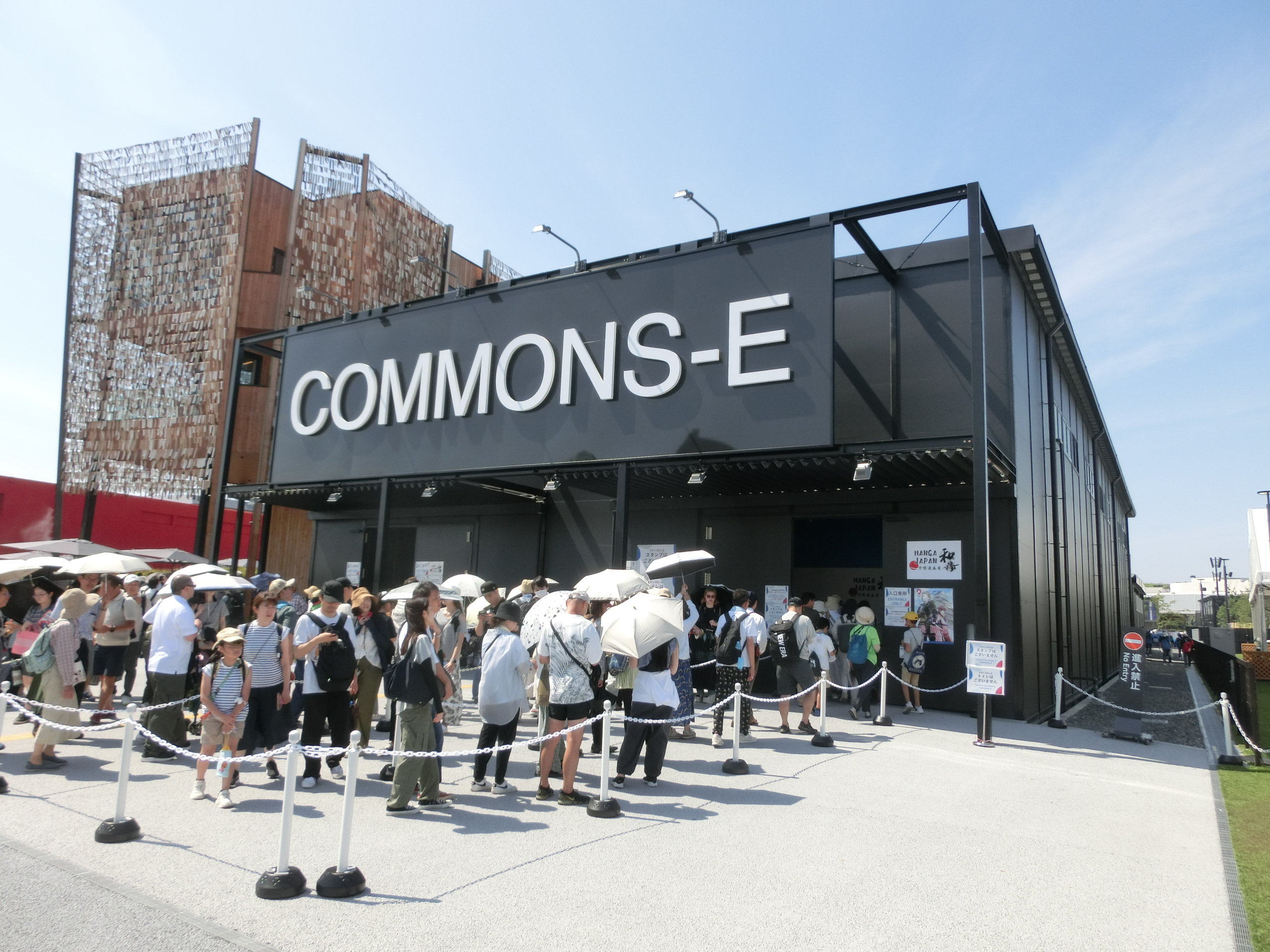
Commons E Pavilion (unused)

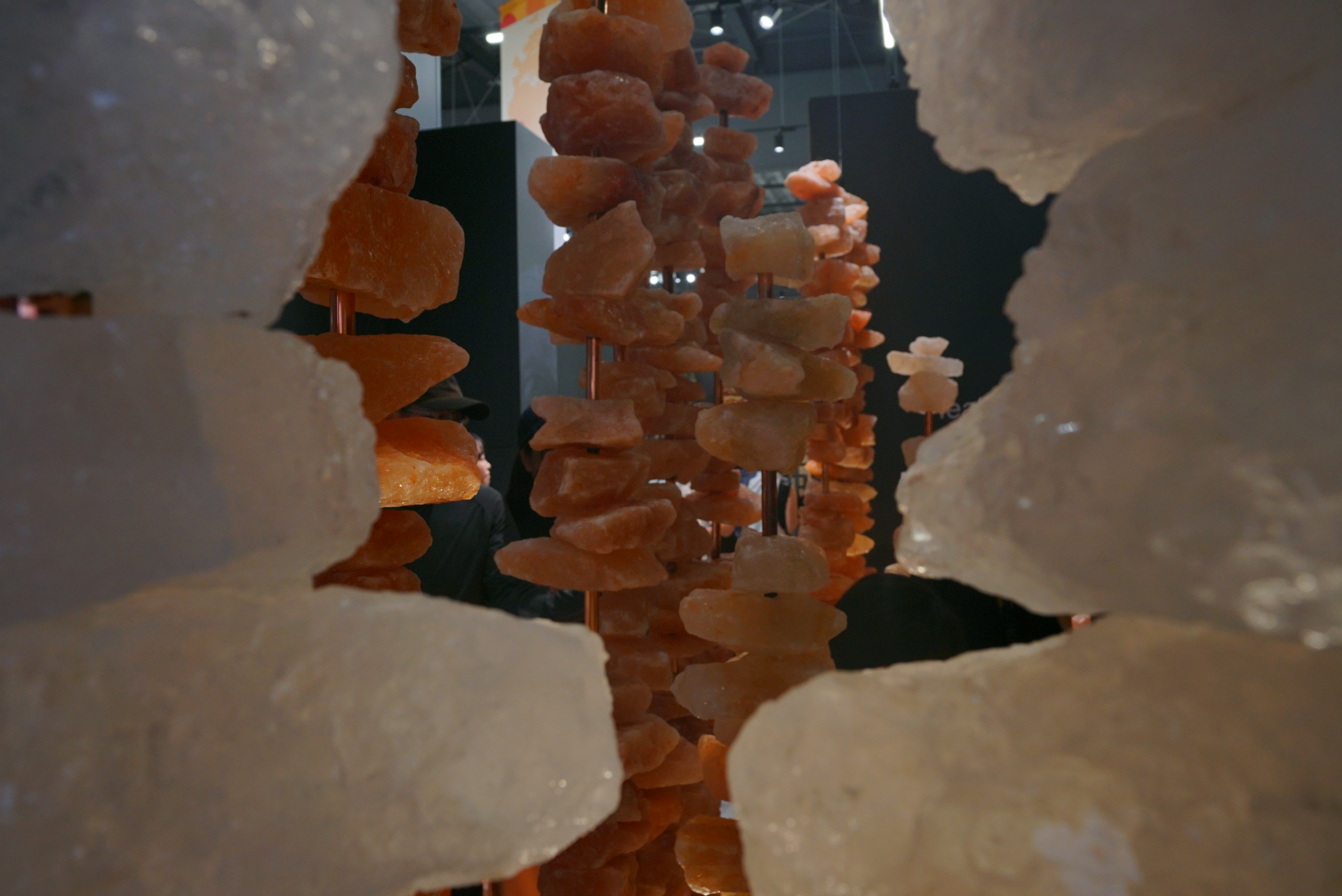
Pakistan Pavilion

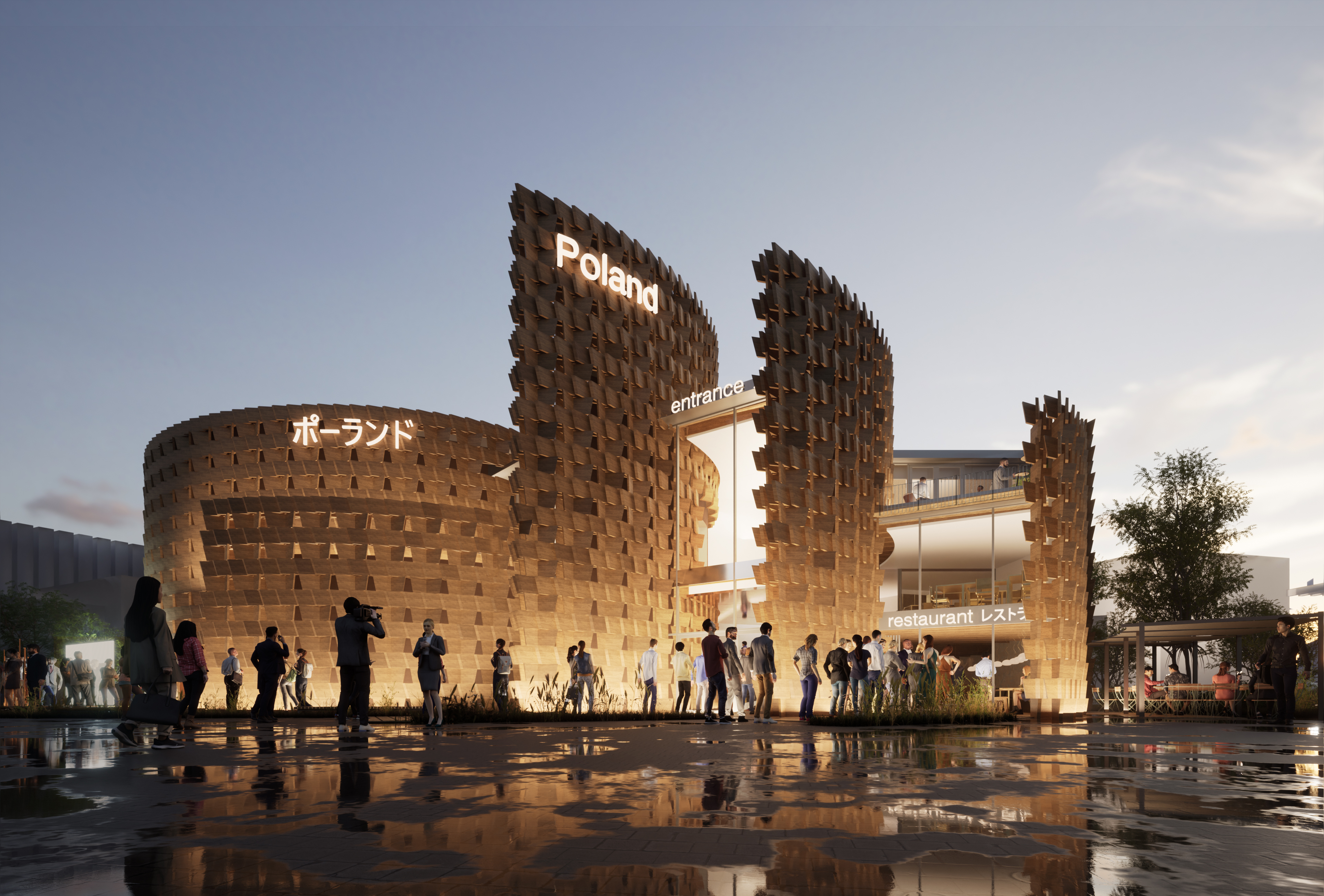
Poland Pavilion

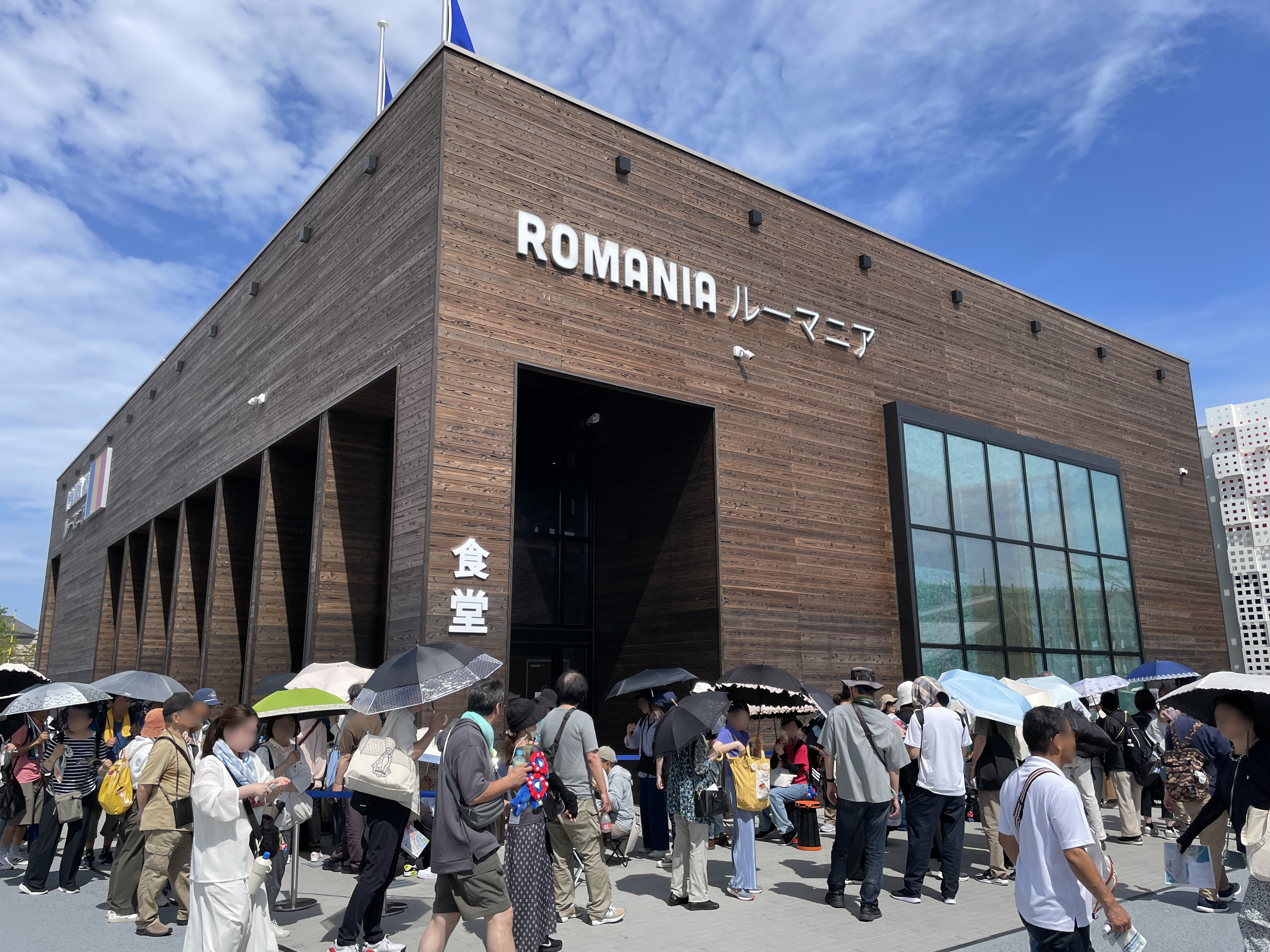
Romania Pavilion

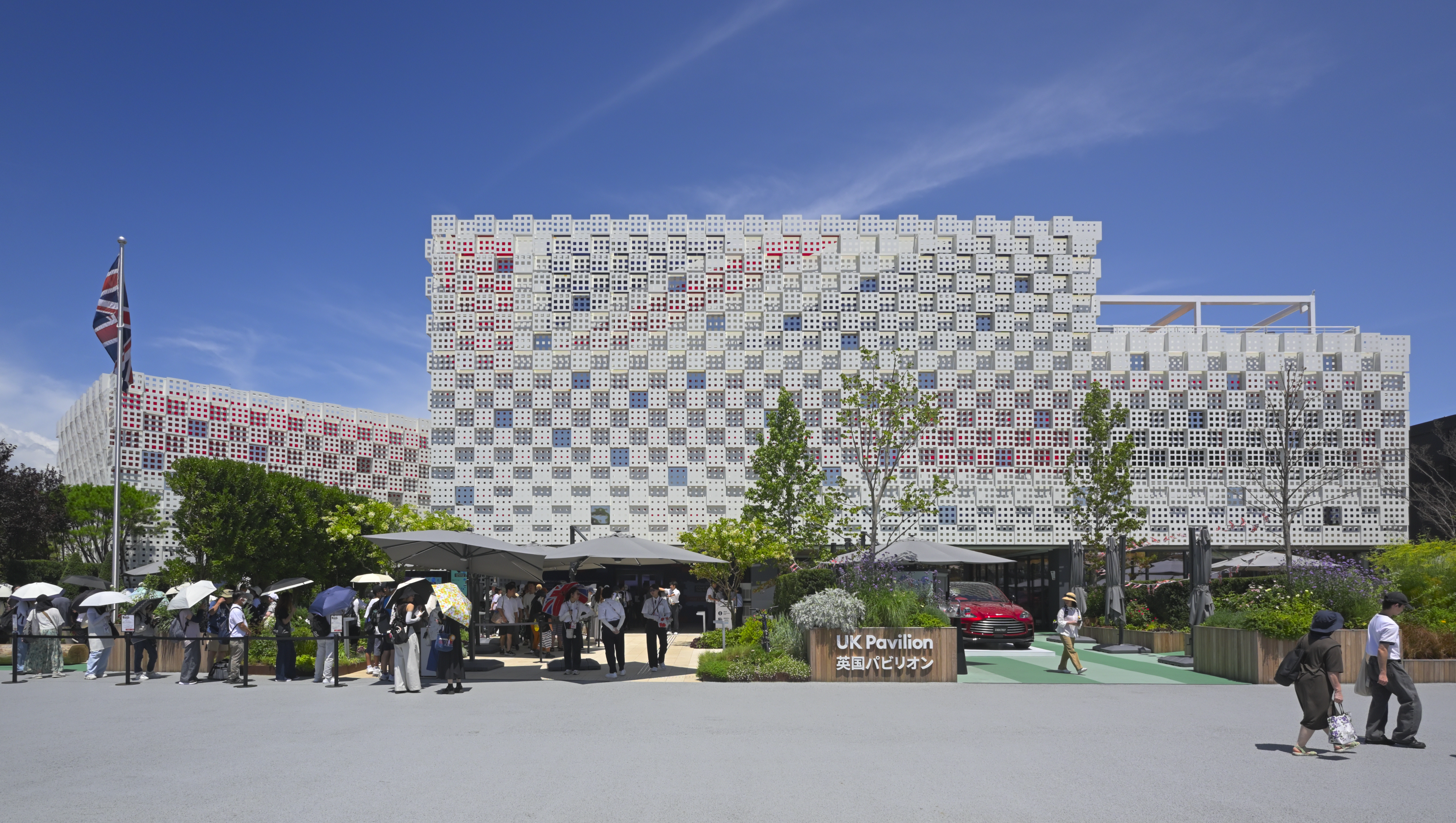
UK Pavilion

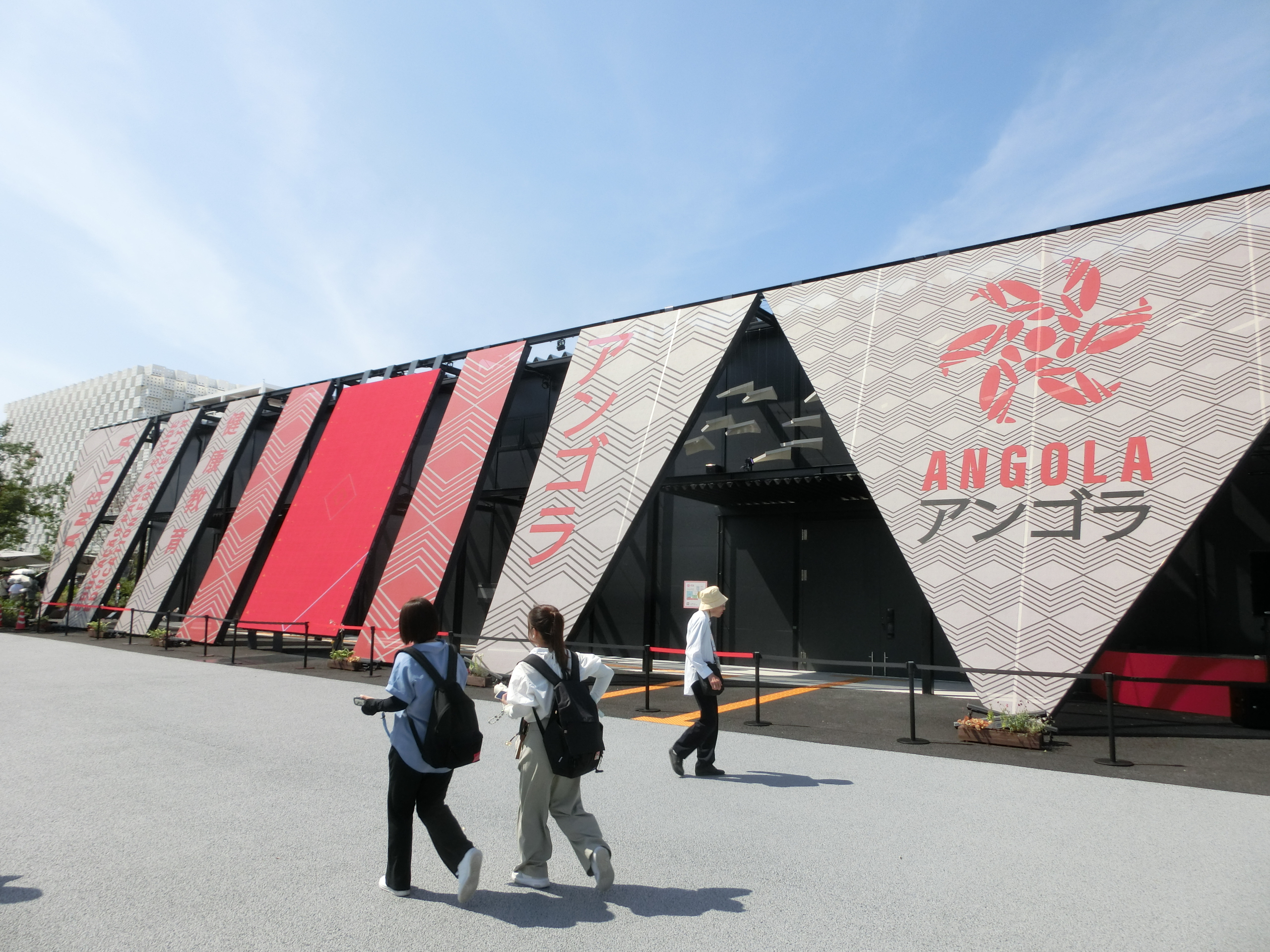
Angola Pavilion

=== Signature Zone ===
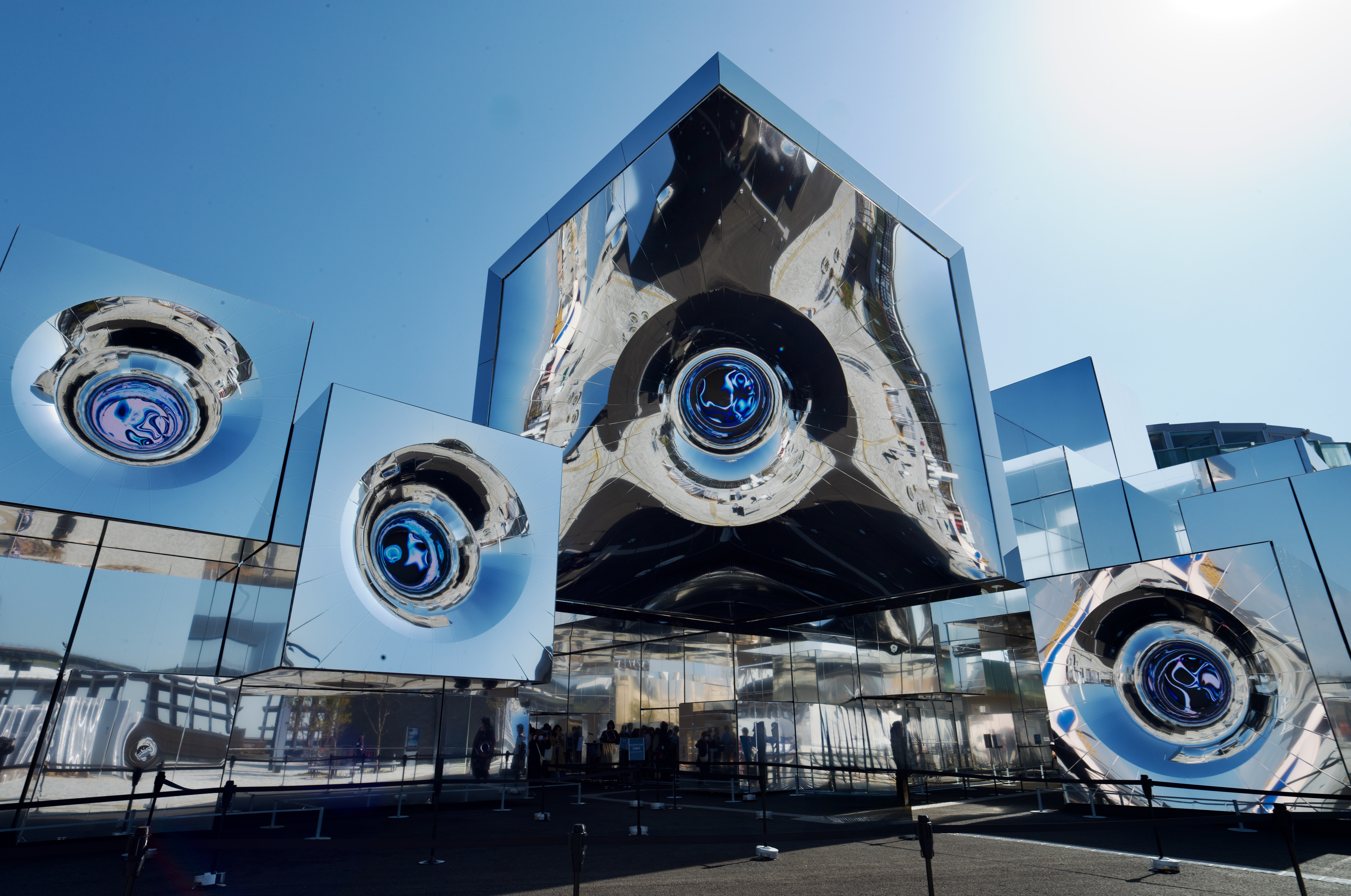
null²

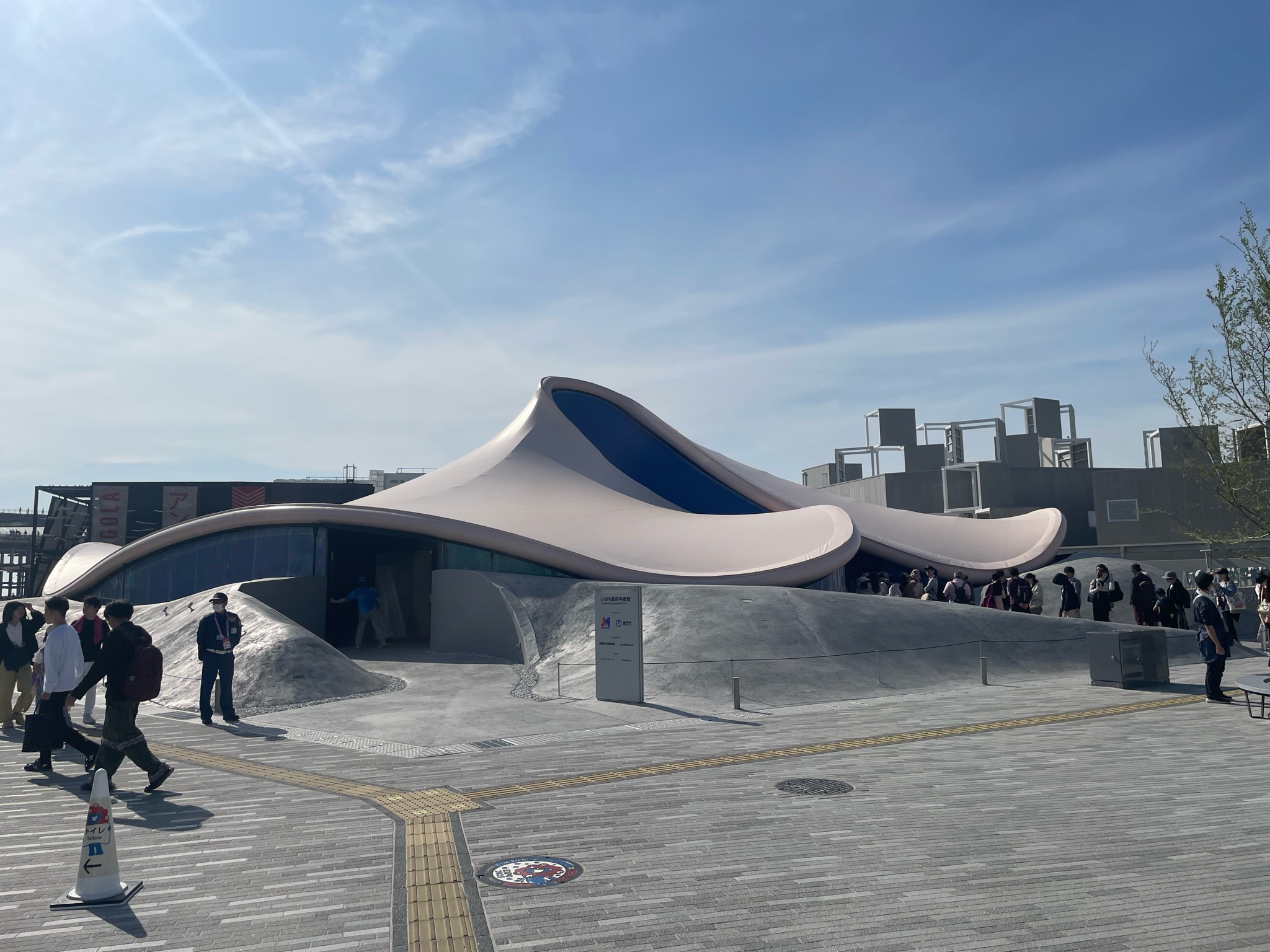
Dynamic Equilibrium of Life

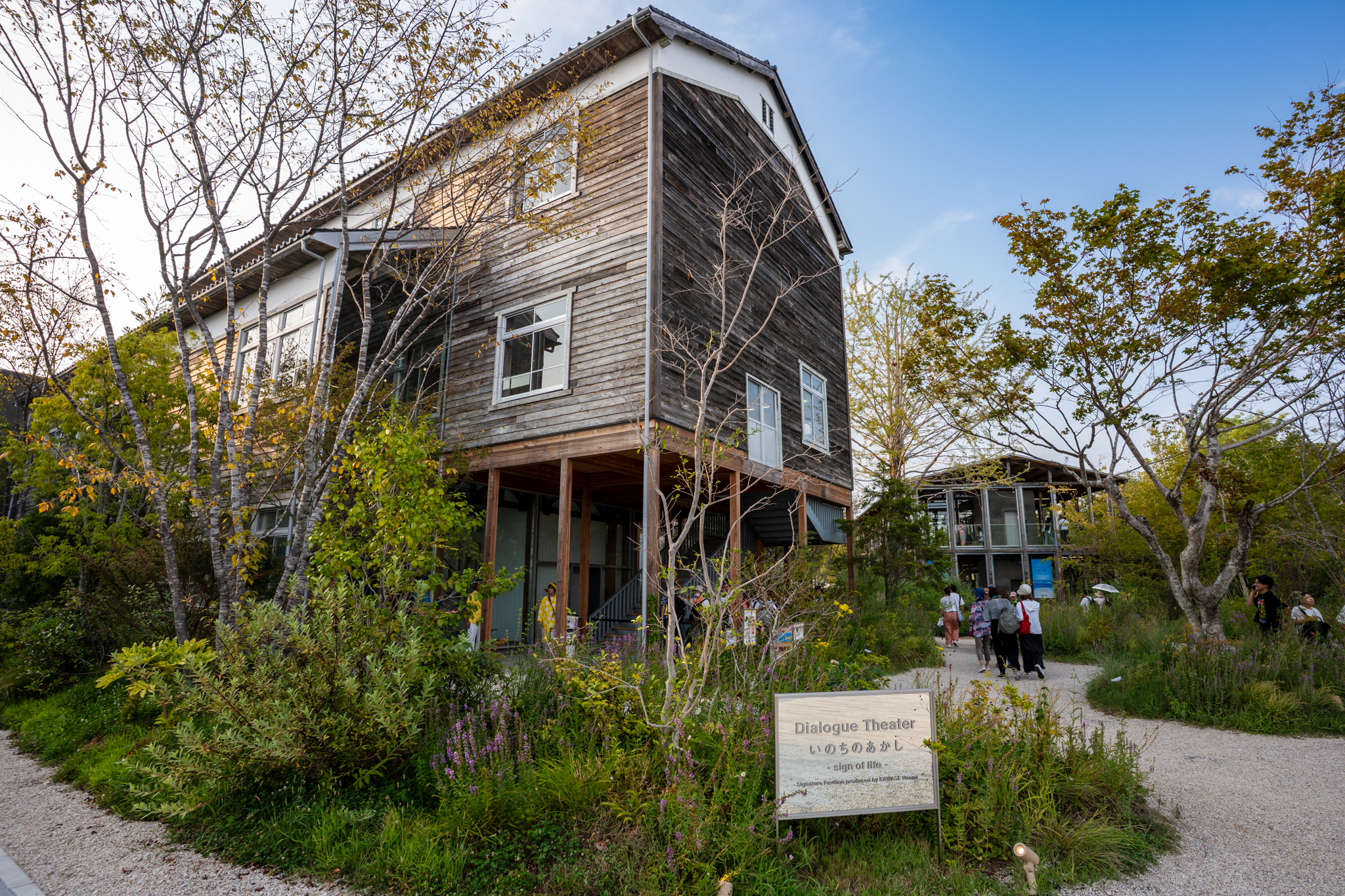
Dialogue Theater - sign of life -

=== Future Life Zone ===
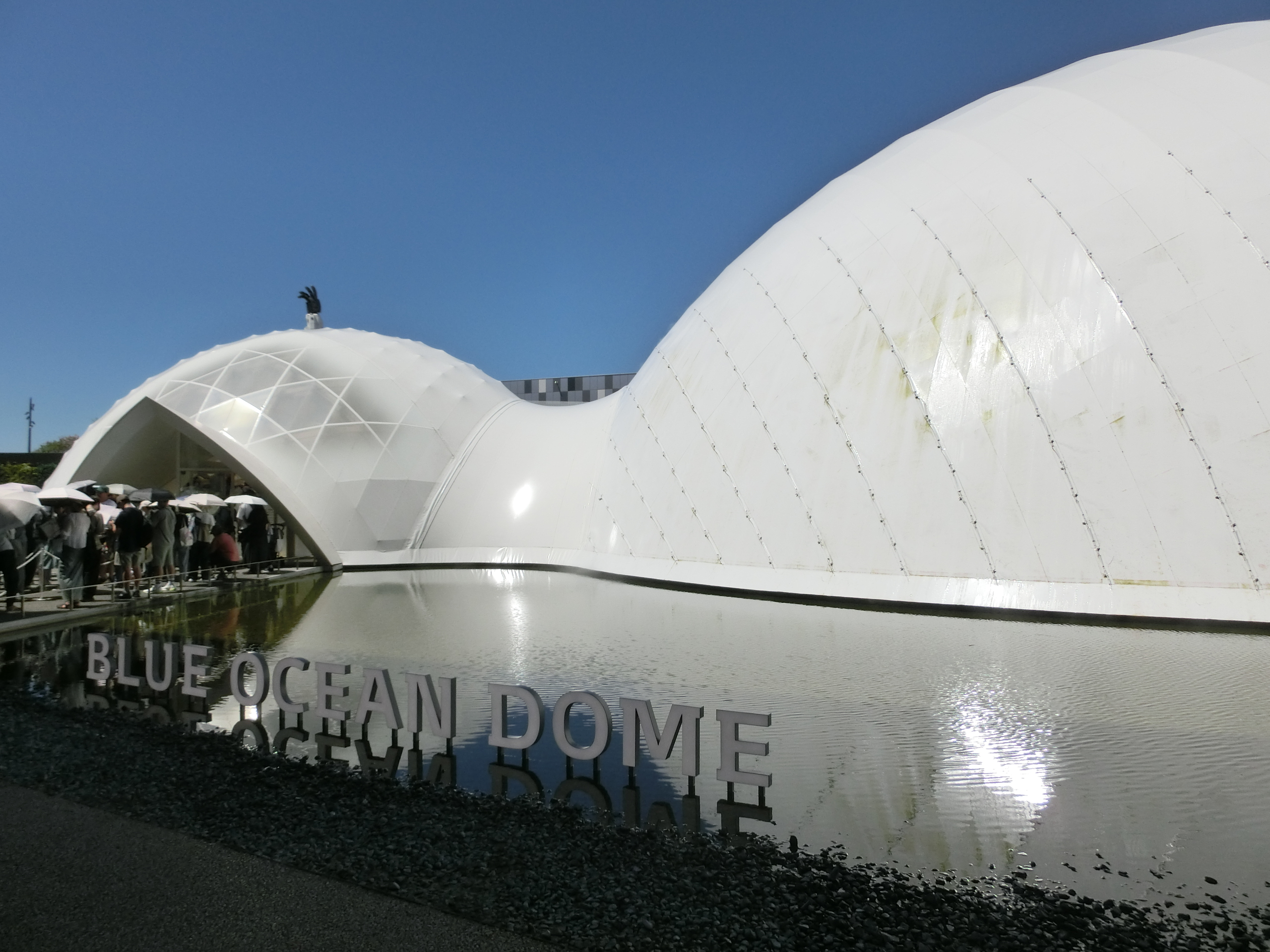
Zeri Japan Blue Ocean Dome

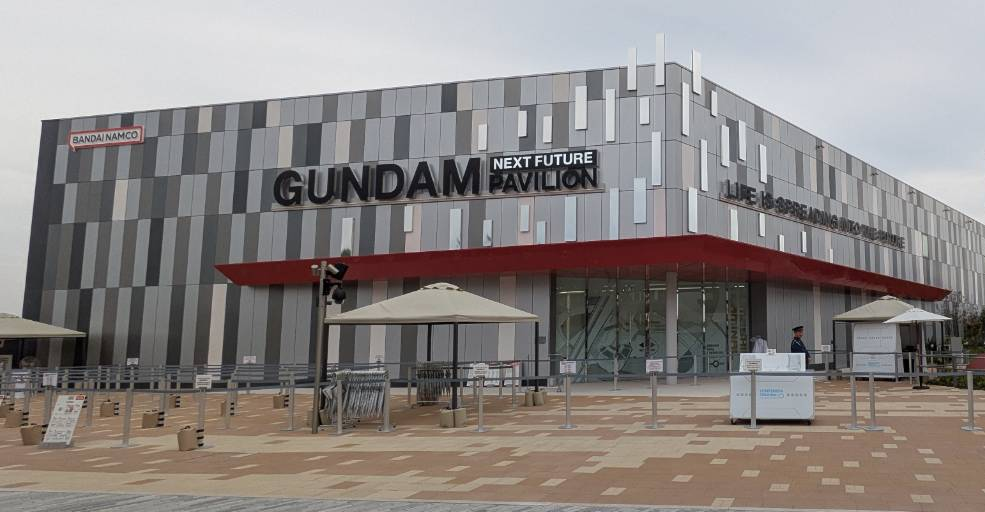
Gundam Next Future Pavilion

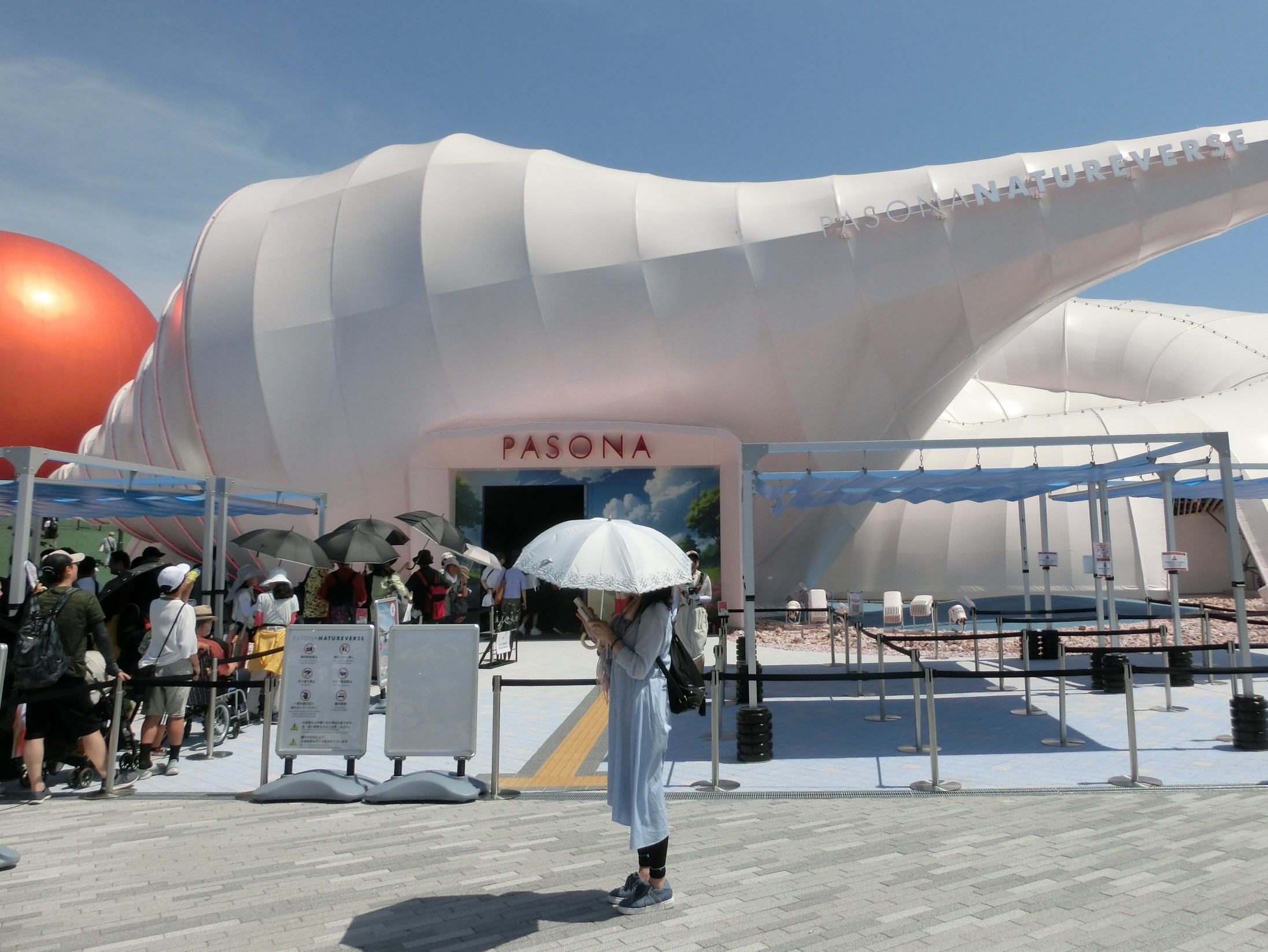
Pasona Natureverse Pavilion

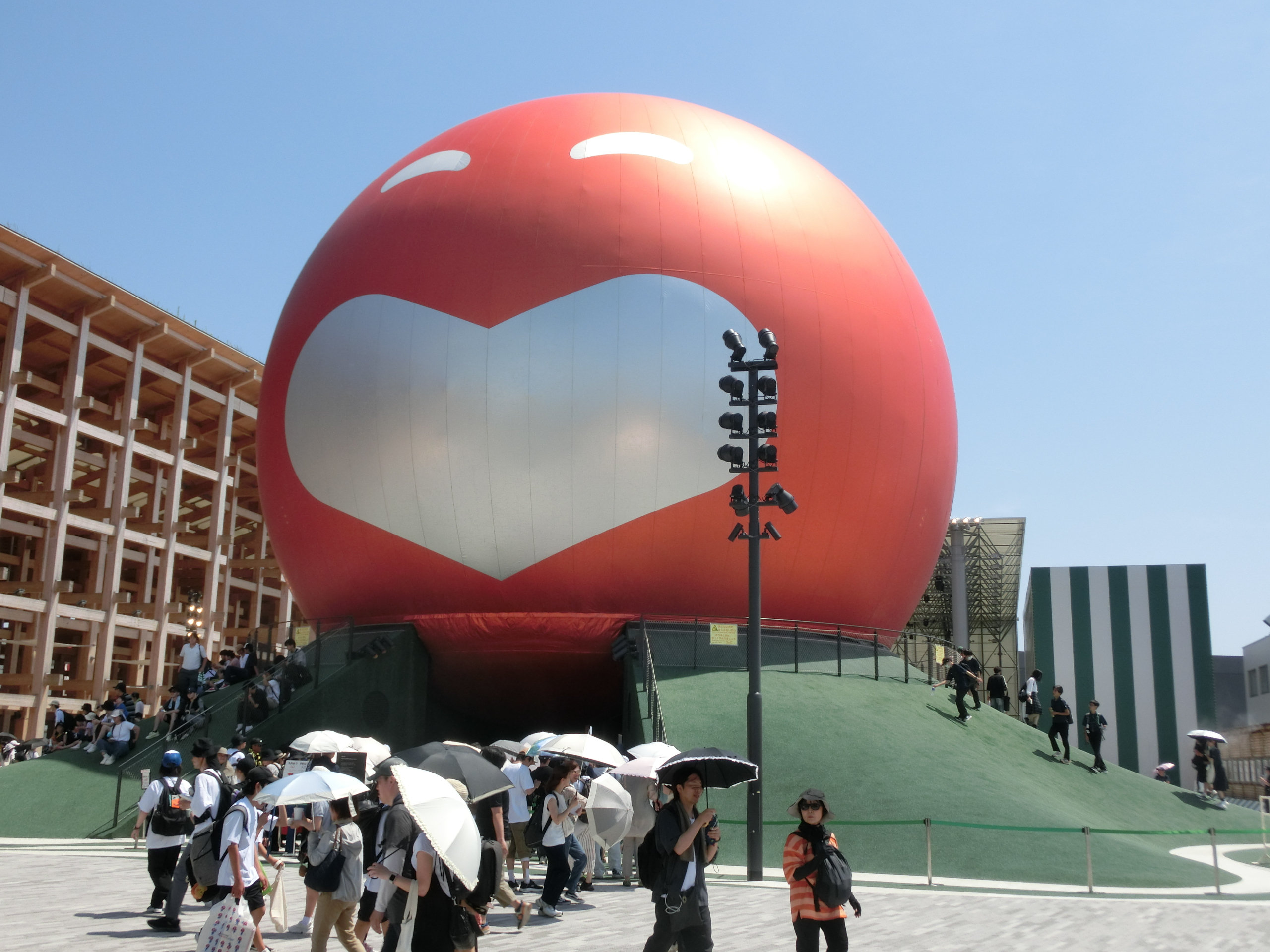
Yoshimoto Waraii Myraii Pavilion

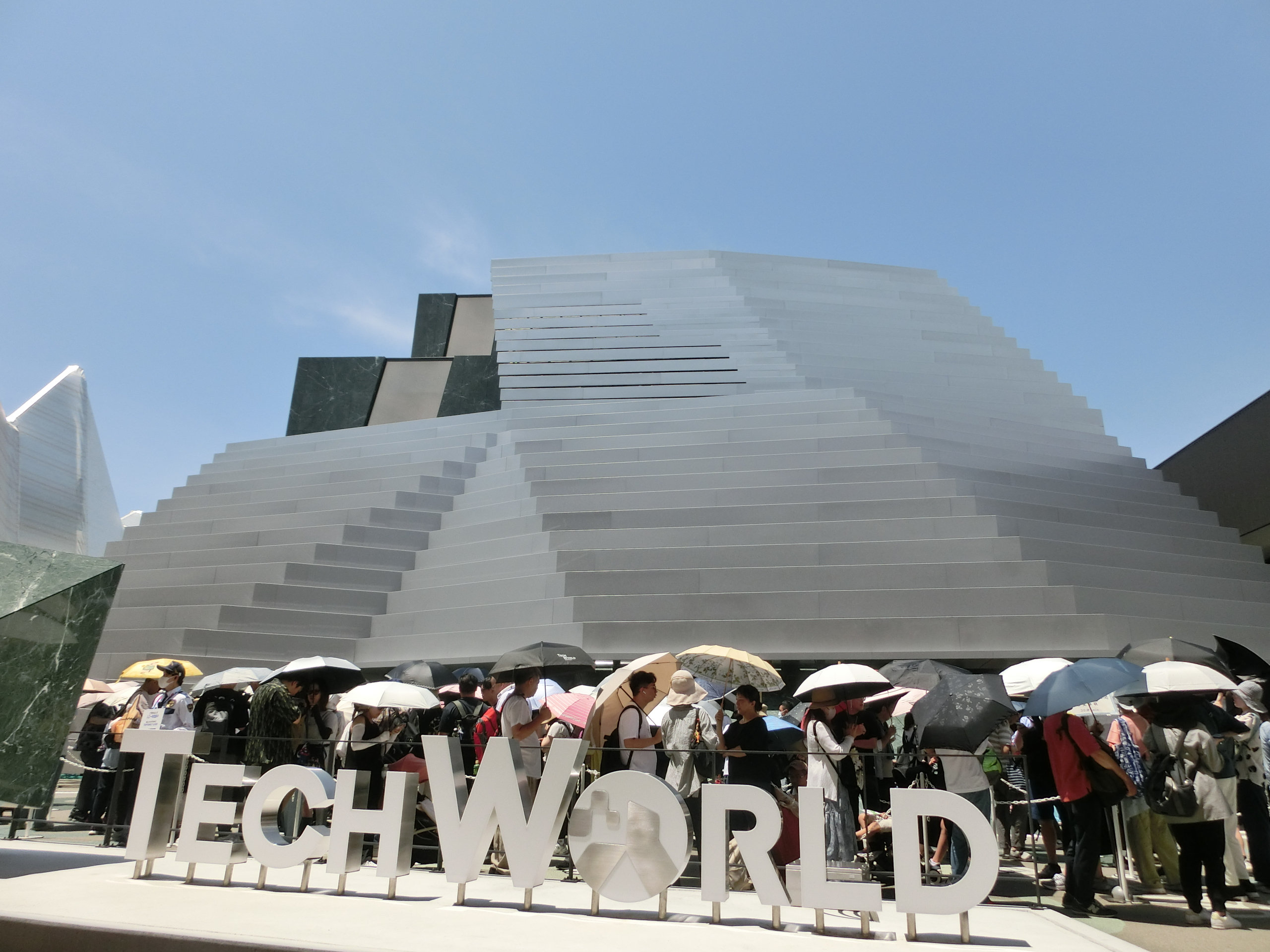
Tech World Pavilion

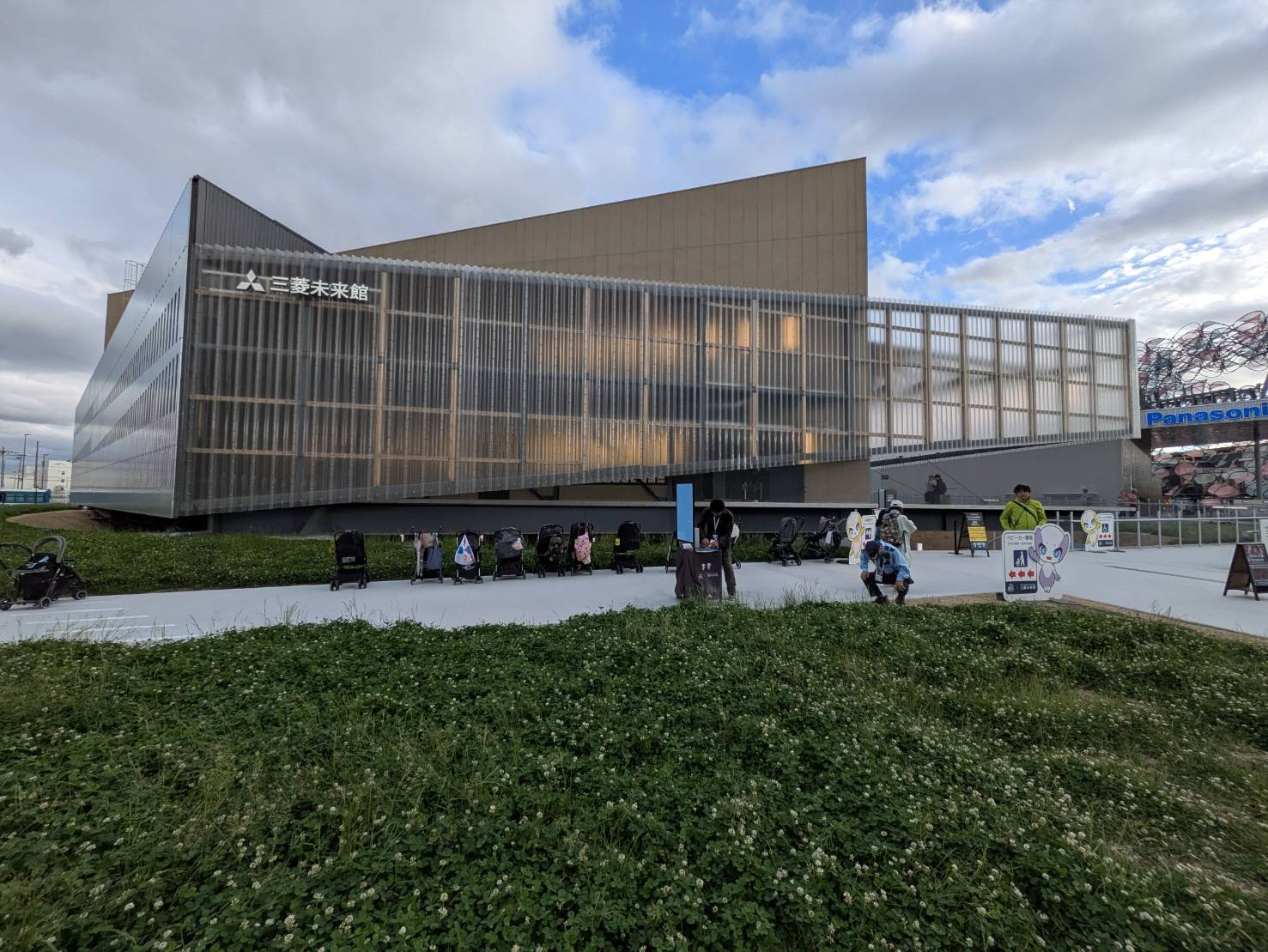
Mitsubishi Future Pavilion

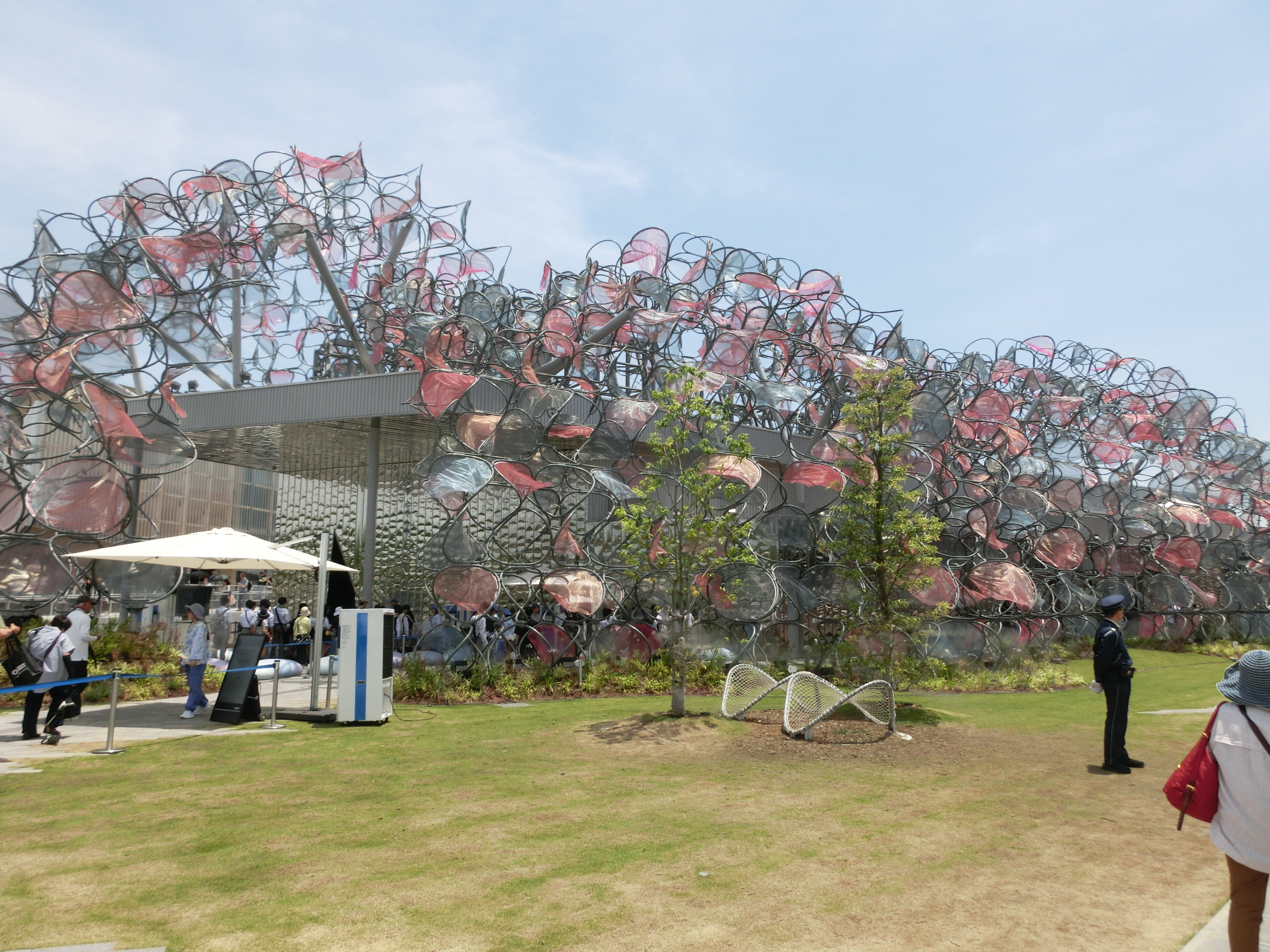
Panasonic Pavilion

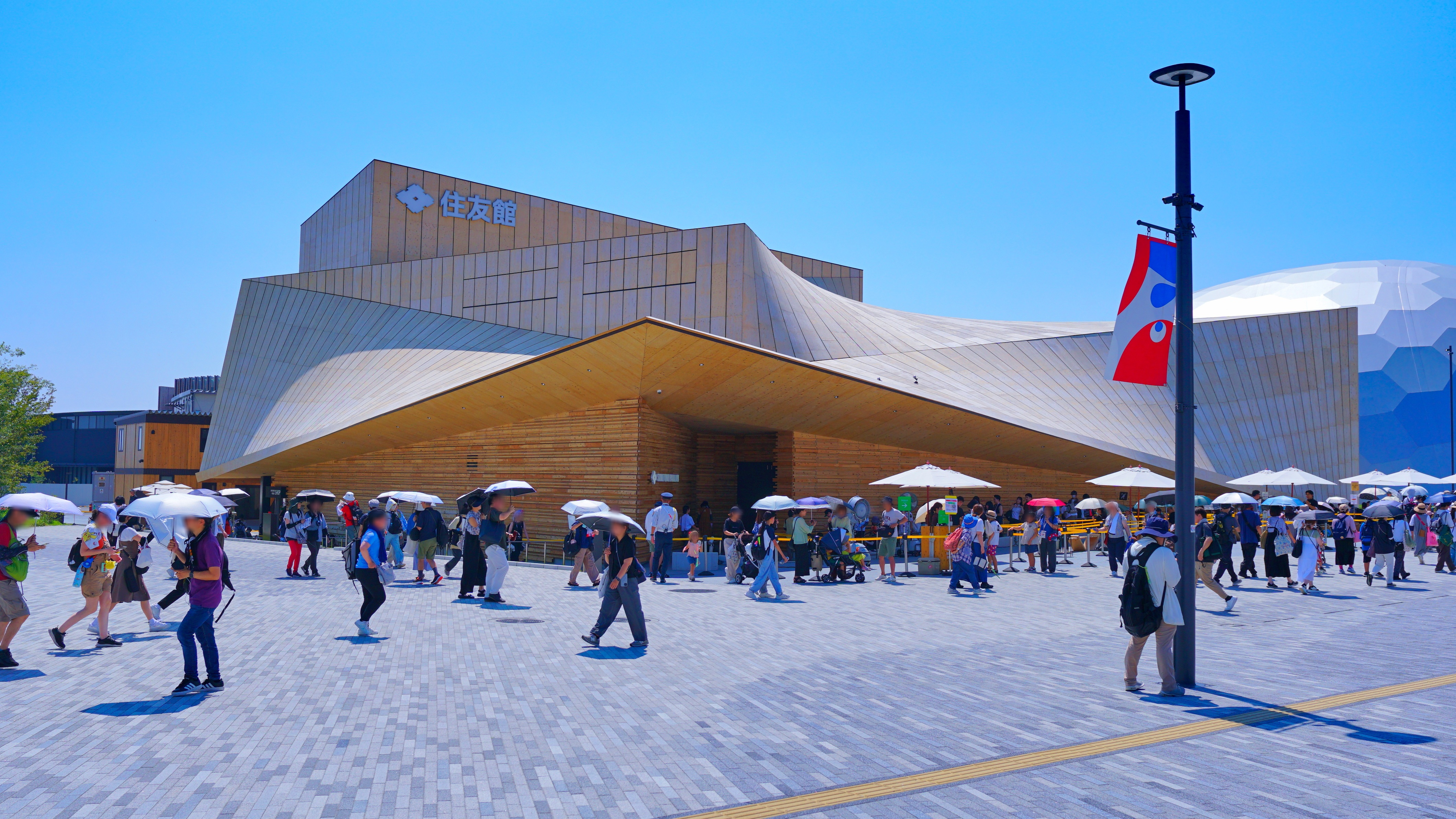
Sumitomo Pavilion

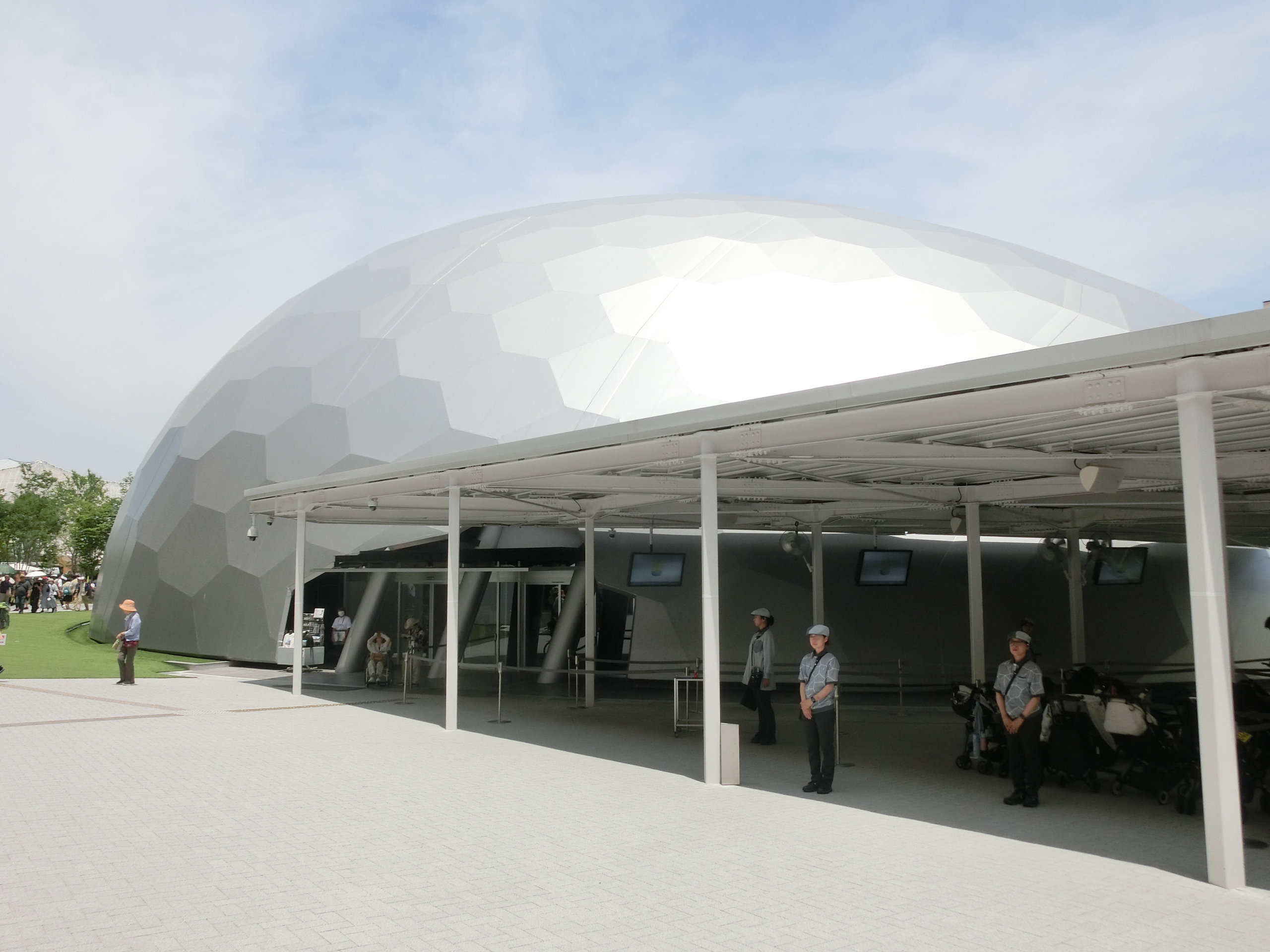
Electric Power Pavilion

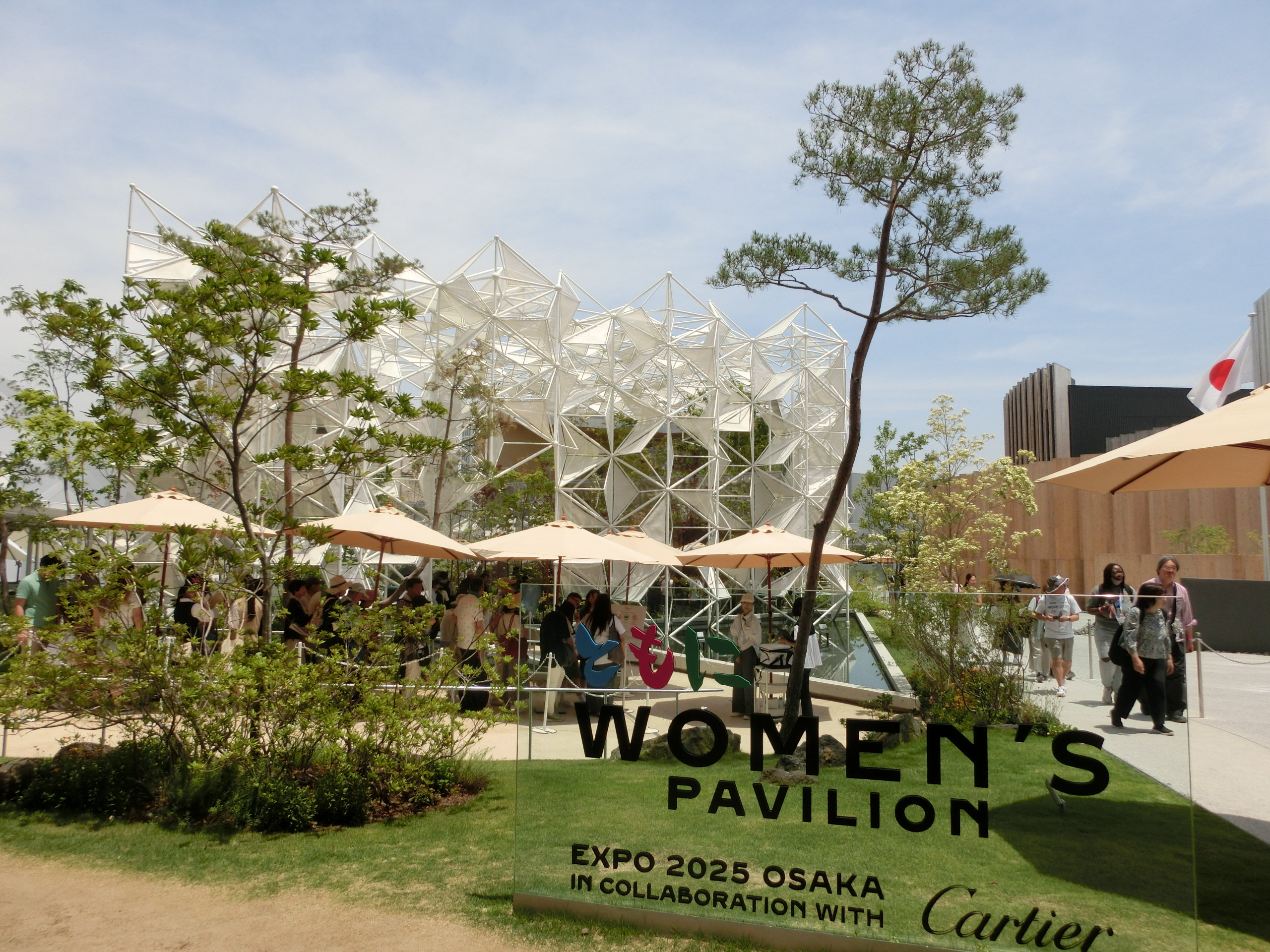
Women's Pavilion in collaboration with Cartier

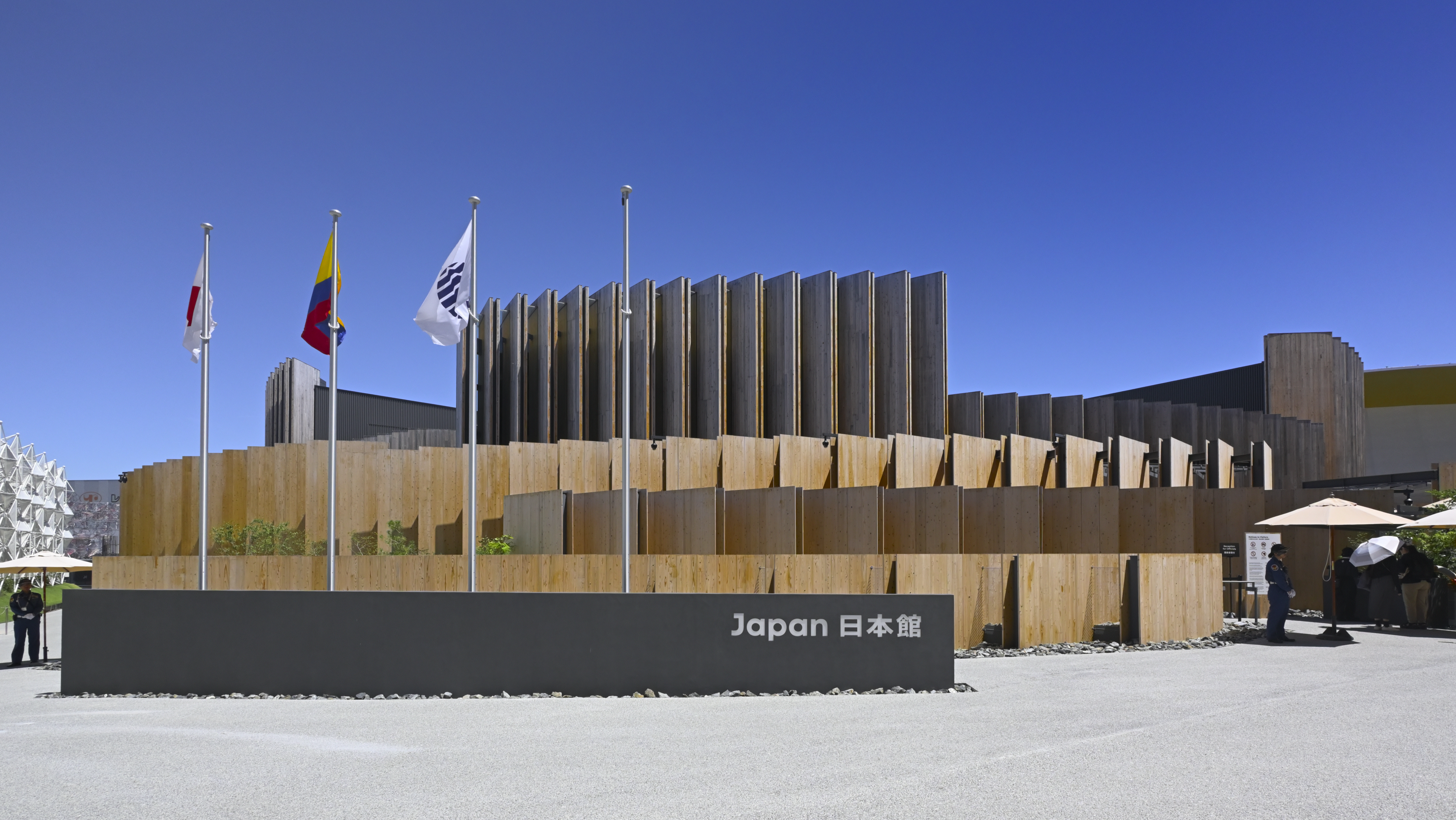
Japan Pavilion

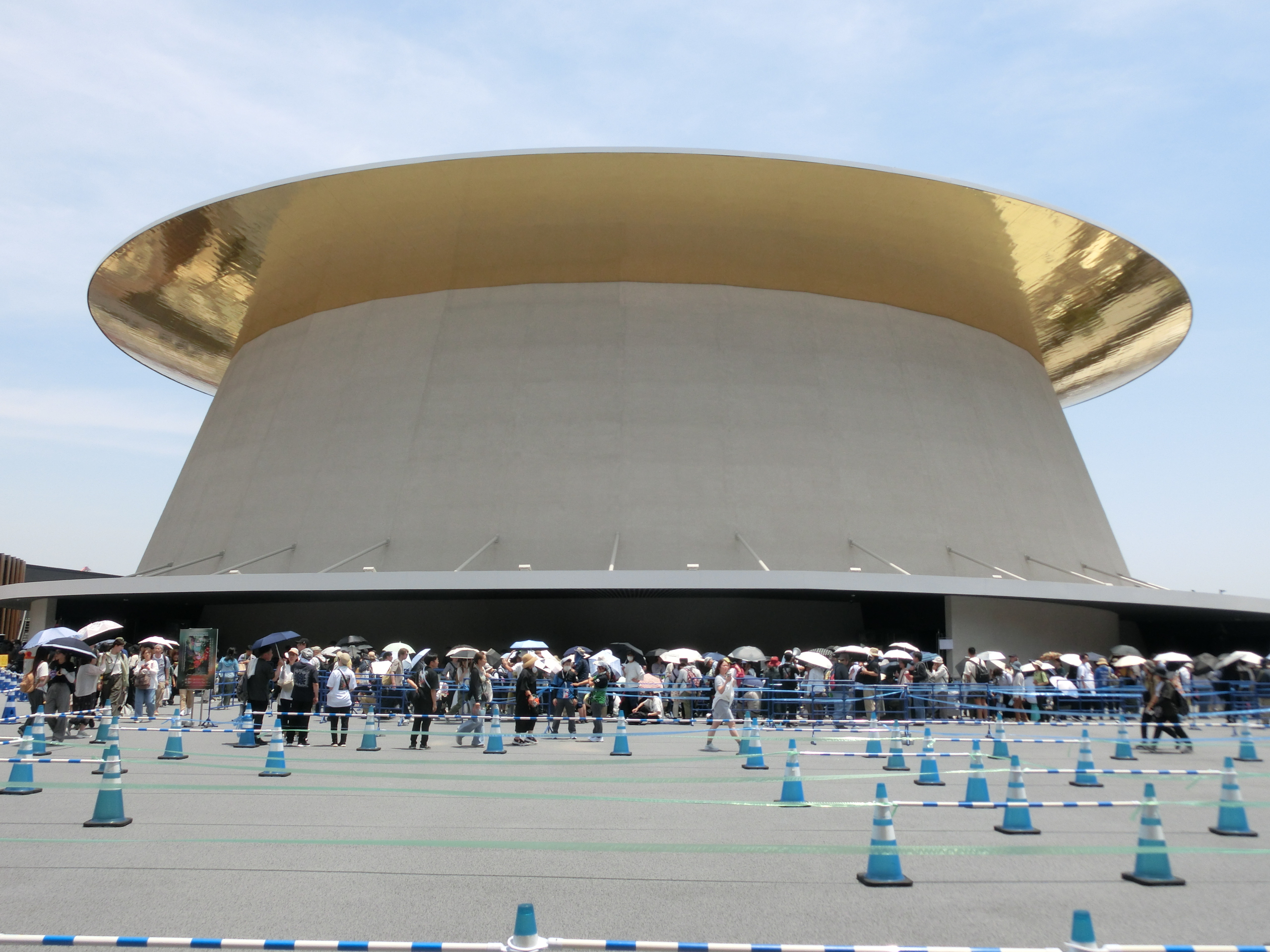
Expo Hall

== Directors ==
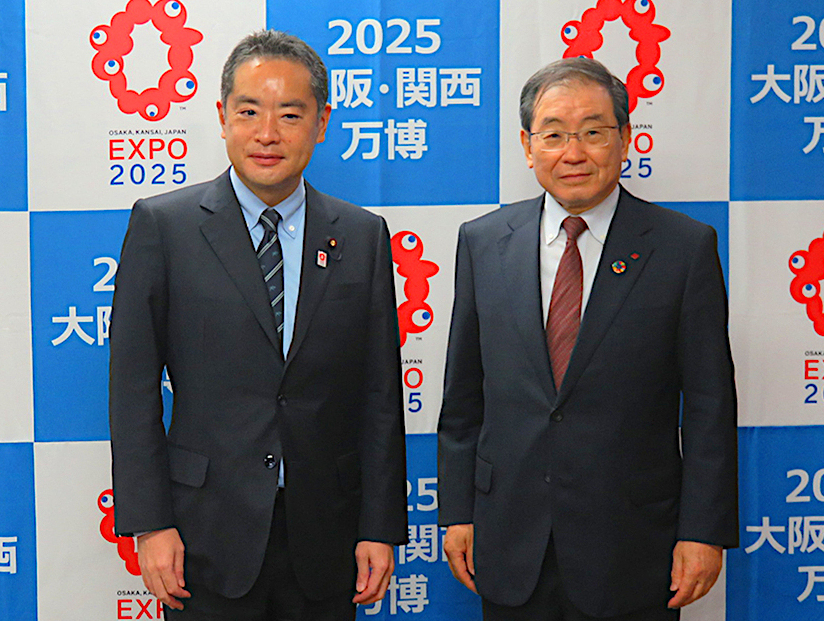
Minister for the World Expo 2025 Shinji Inoue and Chairman of Japan Business Federation Masakazu Tokura (2021)

The directors of the expo were announced on 23 May 2019 and include Hiroyuki Ikeda, Kengo Sakurada, Hirofumi Yoshimura (Governor of Osaka), and Ichirō Matsui (Mayor of Osaka), with Hiroyuki Ishige as the secretary general, and Hiroyuki Takeuchi and Manatsu Ichinoki acting as vice secretaries general.

The current chairman and Representative Director of the Japan Association for the 2025 World Exposition is Masakazu Tokura, Chairman of the Japan Business Federation. He has been the chairman and Representative Director of the Japan Association for the 2025 World Exposition since June 2021.

== Concerns and controversies ==
=== Increasing hosting costs ===
In September 2017, the construction costs for the venue were estimated at 125 billion yen, and the national government, Osaka Prefecture, Osaka City, and the business community submitted an estimate to the International Exposition Bureau that each would bear just over ¥40 billion. Of these, the business community agreed that Hakusui-kai, the Sumitomo Group organization of which Kansai Economic Federation Chairman Masayoshi Matsumoto is a member, and Japan Business Federation would bear ¥10 billion, and the Kansai business community would bear 20 billion yen. Hakusui-kai subsequently decided to donate 10 billion yen at a meeting in September 2019.

In December 2020, due to a cost-of-living crisis, the estimated construction costs for the venue were revised upwards to a maximum of ¥185 billion. As before, the national government, Osaka Prefecture, Osaka City, and the business community would each bear one-third of the cost. In October 2022, the construction cost of the pavilion was revised up to 9.9 billion yen, an increase of ¥2.5 billion from the initial estimate. In September 2023, the construction cost of the venue was adjusted to about ¥235 billion, an increase of another ¥45 billion.

On 27 November 2022, Eiko Jimi, the Minister in charge of the Expo, announced that the government would have to pay ¥83.7 billion in addition to the construction cost of the venue. The breakdown is as follows: the total cost of the construction, exhibition, operation, and removal of the Japan Pavilion would be up to approximately ¥36 billion, the support for exhibitors from developing countries would be approximately ¥24 billion, security costs would be approximately ¥19.9 billion, and the cost of building momentum for the Expo would be approximately ¥3.8 billion. This does not include the cost of some interior construction work and is expected to be higher.

On 14 December 2022, the Japan World Expo Association announced a proposed funding plan to increase the Expo's operating costs (such as personnel costs) by 40% from the initial estimate to ¥116 billion. The largest amount, ¥56 billion, was allocated to "venue management costs" such as venue operation and safety measures. The Expo's operating costs were nearly double the initial estimate due to measures to combat congestion and strengthened security measures following the political polarization in Japan and South Korea, such as the assassination of Shinzo Abe linked to the Unification Church, anti-government protests and riots, and the Seoul Halloween crowd crush the previous year.

=== Total smoking ban rules ===
After the opening of the Expo, there were reports that the smoking ban was not being followed within the venue. Based on the themes of this Expo, such as "life" and "health," the Expo Association had introduced a total smoking ban at the Yumeshima venue. In addition, in March 2024, there was an explosion caused by methane gas igniting during construction on the west side of the venue. Just before the opening, a concentration of gas that could cause an explosion was detected underground in the same area, so smoking also poses the risk of ignition.

=== Health concerns ===
The site of the expo, Yumeshima, was infested with chironomids; small, fly-like insects that resemble mosquitoes, due to the many wetlands and waterside areas in the area, and the salt-tolerant chironomids that inhabit the Water Plaza on the south side of the venue. Although chironomids do not bite people, they affect the scenery and hygiene of the venue by attaching themselves to buildings, and visitors and related parties complained of their discomfort. Osaka Prefecture requested cooperation from companies such as Earth Corporation, and measures were taken, such as the provision of extermination products and spraying chemicals. In connection with this outbreak, false information was spread on social media, such as "chironomids at the Osaka Expo transmit malaria," but experts and fact-checking organizations have explained that chironomids do not bite people and do not transmit infectious diseases.

On 28 May, Legionella bacteria were detected in the artificial pond in the Forest of Tranquility in the center of the venue, and on the 4th of the following month, Legionella bacteria were detected in the seawater of the "Water Plaza" where the water show was held, both at levels 20 times higher than the national guideline. In response to this, measures were taken such as cancelling the water show for the time being and suspending the use of the pond. Even after receiving the report of the detection of Legionella bacteria from the health center, the Expo Association did not immediately take measures to ban entry and stated that "we did not recognize that the advice from the health center required urgency".

However, this was the result of the "live bacteria PCR method," which gives results quickly, and experts pointed out that "it may react to things other than the bacteria being tested." In response to this, a re-examination using the more accurate "culture method" found that no Legionella bacteria, which could cause pneumonia, were detected in the seawater of the Water Plaza, so after consulting with the Osaka City Health Center and others, it was decided to resume the water show on 11 July 2025. In addition, the water pond at the Forest of Tranquility was cleaned and disinfected, and a re-examination on 7 June revealed that the levels were below the guideline values, so consideration is being given to reopening the pond to the public. However, since some facilities are connected to the pond in the center of the forest, the decision was made to suspend its use for the duration of the event out of consideration for the impact on living creatures there.

=== Unpaid construction costs for overseas pavilions ===
A number of cases have been discovered in the overseas pavilions, including the Angola, Malta Pavilion, and the China Pavilions, where construction costs have not been paid by the main contractor to subcontractors involved in the construction. This may have been due to rushed construction, and all of these contractors are complaining about their plight.

== Legacy ==
Regarding the use of the site after the closing ceremony, Osaka Prefecture and Osaka City solicited proposals from the private sector, and selected two of them as the winning proposals. The proposals were from a group of seven companies including Obayashi Corporation Osaka Head Office, and a group of six companies, including KEPCO Real Estate Development.

The proposal from the seven companies was a plan to develop a circuit with an eye toward attracting a Formula 1 racing track in the future, as well as a large arena, shopping mall, and hotel. The proposal from the six companies including KEPCO Real Estate Development was a plan to create a complex resort facility with a water park with slides and a hotel, with an awareness of the connection to the neighbouring MGM Osaka which was under construction. Osaka City plans to open a public call for developers after October 2025.

Separately, a study group consisting of the Expo Association, Osaka Prefecture and City, and the business community has been discussing how to utilize the Grand Ring after the Expo closes. At a meeting held on 16 September 2025, it was agreed that the northeast 200 meters would remain in a state close to its original form, with a climbable area, and that the city of Osaka would develop the ring and its surrounding area into a municipal park commemorating the Expo. Accordingly, when private developers are invited to use the site, the area northeast of the ring and its surrounding area would be excluded from the scope of the development plan.

The ring was originally planned to be demolished after the end of the Expo 2025, with wooden materials re-used in the future. However, private sectors have proposed preserving 200 meters of the northern ring to preserve as a landmark, while Hirofumi Yoshimura, the governor of the Osaka Prefecture proposed preserving 600 meters of the southern part of the ring. In October 2025, Ishikawa Prefecture officials proposed using some parts of the Grand Ring to rebuild damaged houses in Suzu.

== See also ==
- World's fair
- List of world expositions
- Expo '70
- Expo 2005
