= Yoichi Ochiai =

Japanese academic, artist, and entrepreneur

- 落合 陽一
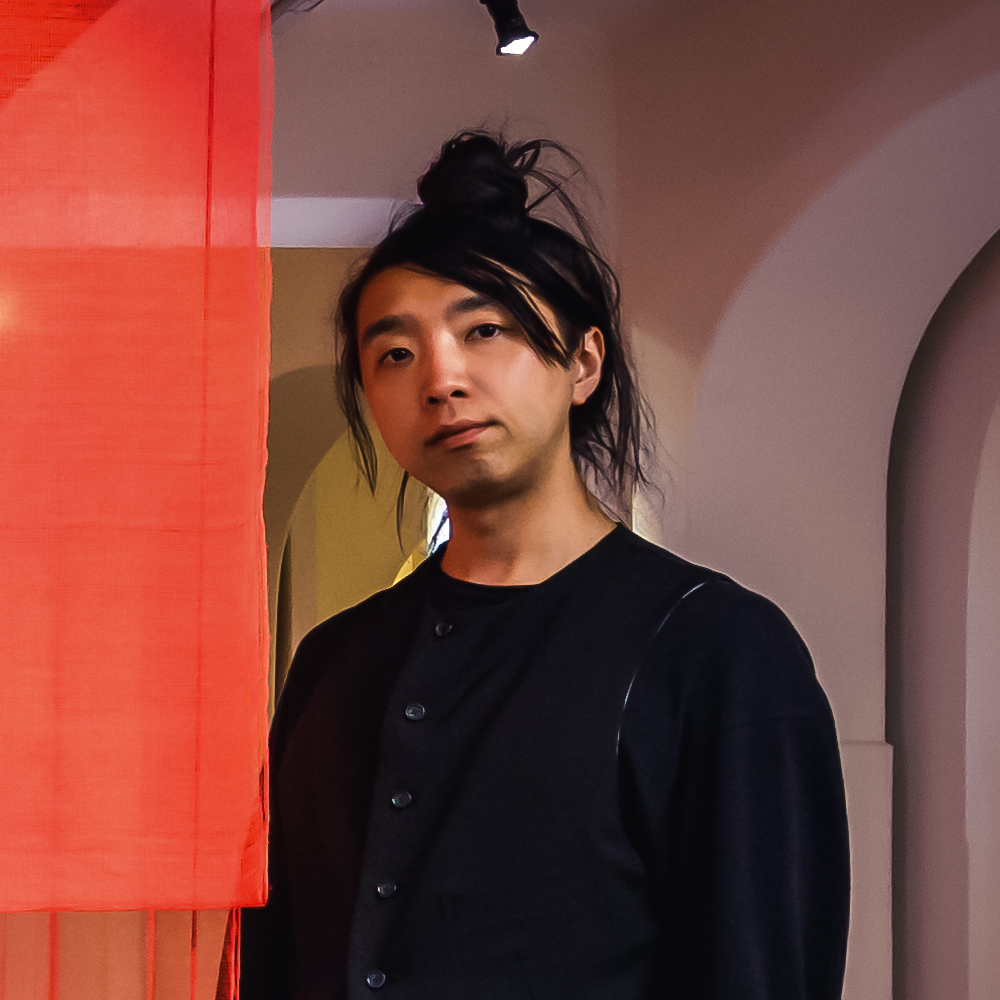
- Ochiai photographed at Kudan House, Tokyo (2024)
- Born: 16 September 1987 (age 39)
- Education: University of Tokyo, University of Tsukuba
- Occupations: New media artist, university teacher, entrepreneur
- Notable work: Null-Beni-An, null²
- Father: Nobuhiko Ochiai
- Awards: Prix Ars Electronica; World Technology Award
- Website: yoichiochiai.com

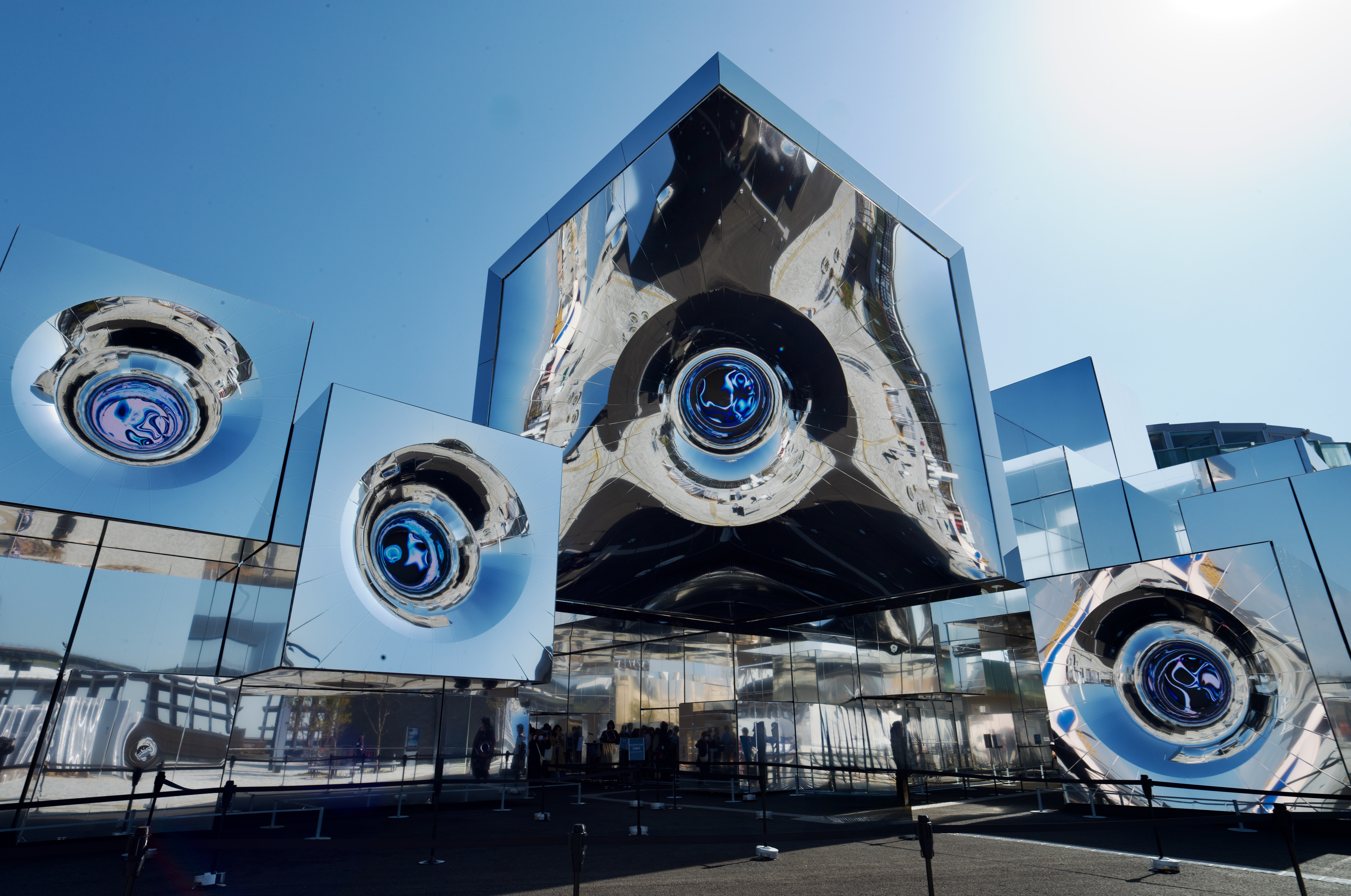
"Signature Pavilion" null² by Ochiai, Expo 2025, Osaka, Kansai (2025)

Yoichi Ochiai (落合 陽一, Ochiai Yoichi; born 16 September 1987) is a Japanese media artist, entrepreneur, and academic. He has a doctorate from the University of Tokyo, and is a professor at the University of Tsukuba Library; Information and Media Professor and Director of the Centre for Digital Nature Development and Research; Specially-appointed professor at Digital Hollywood University; as well as a visiting professor at Osaka University of Arts and Kyoto City University of Arts, and Kanazawa College of Art. Since 2025 he has also held a position as associate professor at the University of Tokyo Graduate School of Frontier Sciences, Department of Complexity Science and Engineering.

== Biography ==
Ochiai was born on 16 September 1987 in Minato, Tokyo. His father is the international journalist Nobuhiko Ochiai. He graduated from Kaisei Academy in 2007 and from the College of Media Arts, Science and Technology at the University of Tsukuba in 2011. He completed his master's degree at the University of Tokyo Graduate School of Interdisciplinary Information Studies in 2013 and became a Japan Society for the Promotion of Science (JSPS) research fellow (DC1) the same year. In 2015 he completed his doctoral degree at the same institution, becoming the first student in the Graduate School of Interdisciplinary Information Studies to finish the programme in a shortened period. His doctoral thesis, supervised by Jun Rekimoto, was titled "Graphics by Computational Acoustic Fields."

In 2015 Ochiai founded Pixie Dust Technologies (PxDT), a wave-control technology startup, and became an assistant professor at the University of Tsukuba, where he established the Digital Nature Laboratory. In 2017 he was promoted to associate professor and appointed head of the Strategic Research Platform towards Digital Nature and assistant to the university president (until 2019).

Beginning in 2019 Ochiai served on several Japanese government advisory bodies, including the Cabinet Office's Moonshot Visionary Council and working groups of the Ministry of Health, Labour and Welfare and the Ministry of Economy, Trade and Industry. In 2020 he became Director of the Centre for Digital Nature Development and Research at the University of Tsukuba and was appointed as a Signature Pavilion Producer for Expo 2025 Osaka, Kansai, later realised as null². He also served as a Cultural Envoy of the Agency for Cultural Affairs in 2020—2021.

In 2022 Ochiai was selected as a Young Global Leader by the World Economic Forum. In 2023 Pixie Dust Technologies listed on the NASDAQ stock exchange; the company went private again in 2024.

In 2025 null², Ochiai's Signature Pavilion at Expo 2025, opened in Osaka. The pavilion features a mirror-membrane exterior that reflects and distorts the surrounding landscape, and an interior "mirror theatre" where visitors encounter their own digital avatars generated in real time. It became one of the most popular pavilions at the Expo, with an admission ratio of approximately 30:1, and was ranked first in Casa Brutus's "Best Pavilion 20". That same year he was appointed associate professor at the University of Tokyo Graduate School of Frontier Sciences.

== Main activity ==
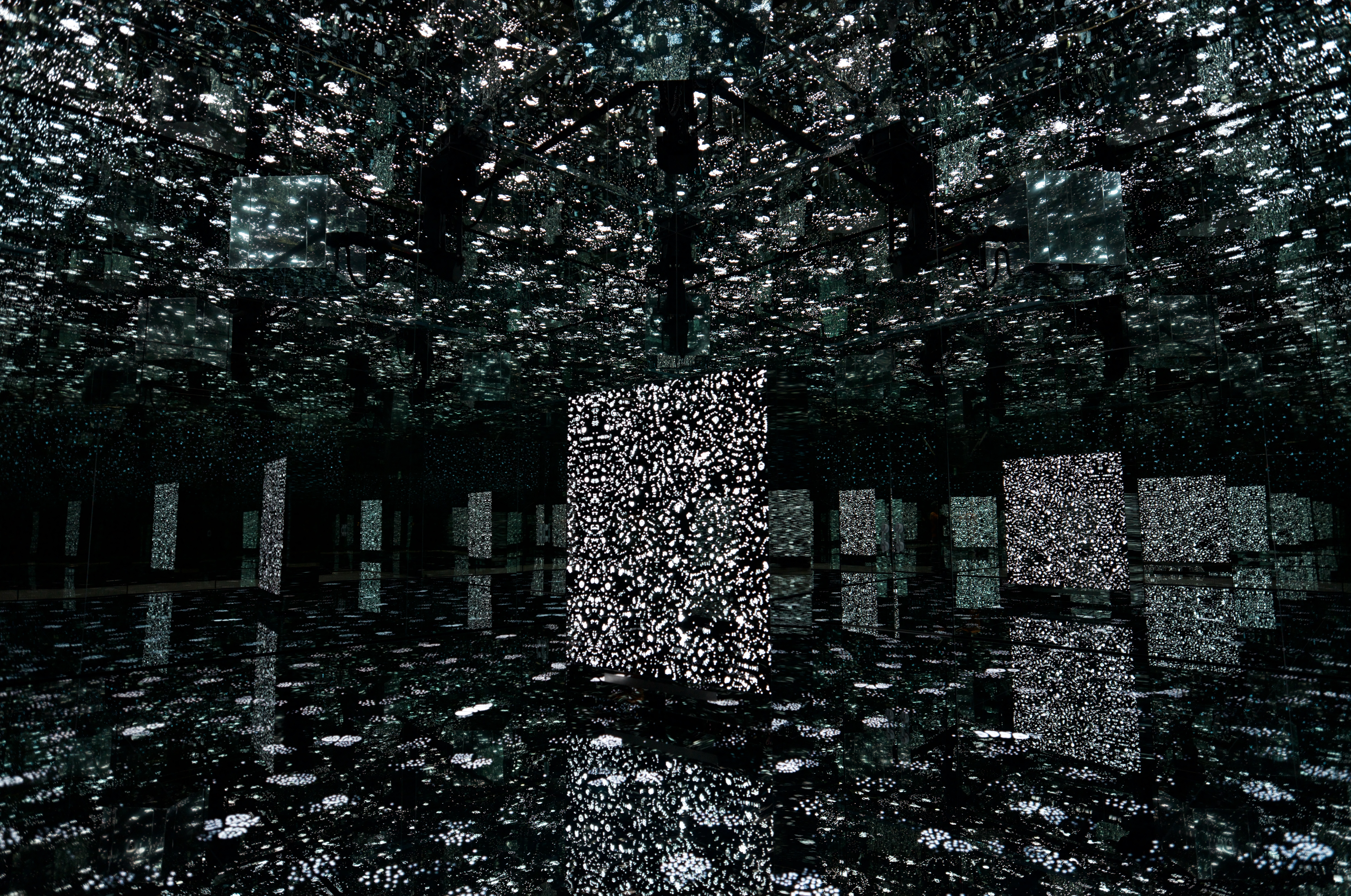
Interior view of Ochiai's null² pavilion, Expo 2025, Osaka, Kansai (2025)

=== As a media artist ===
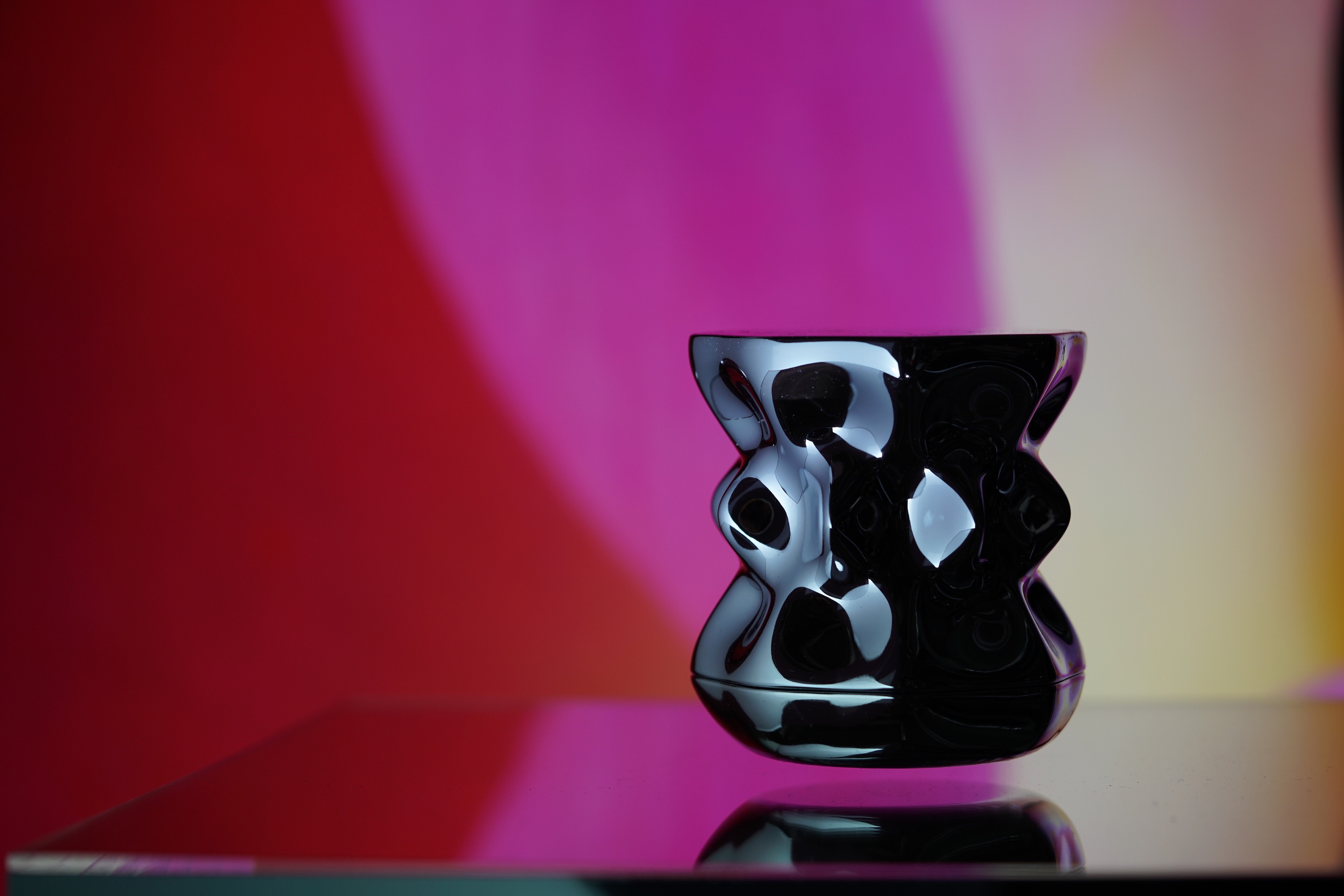
Borrowed Scenery and Materialized Waves (2017)

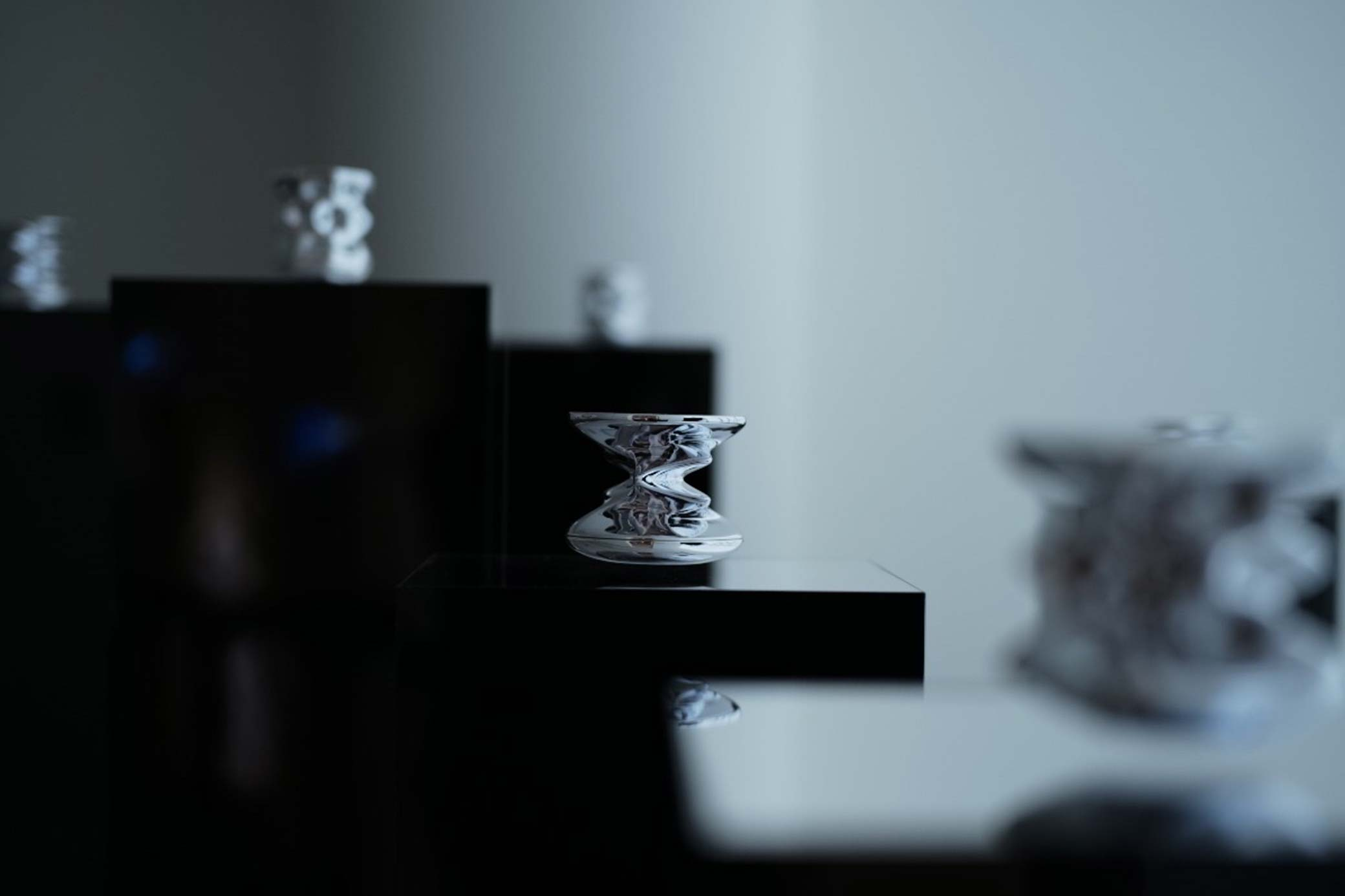
Borrowed Scenery and Materialized Waves

He has been working as a media artist since around 2010. As a media artist, he has several solo and group exhibitions per year, as well as an international communication of Japanese culture. Ochiai's activities range from research to social implementation and are not limited to the expression of electronic technology. Ochiai states, "The vernacular, popular art and production process for local consumption, using something from the 'natural' environment to create a work of art, has not changed since ancient times, whether it is Japanese or Western painting" and considers media art as "Vernacular Art of Digital Nature".

=== As a researcher ===
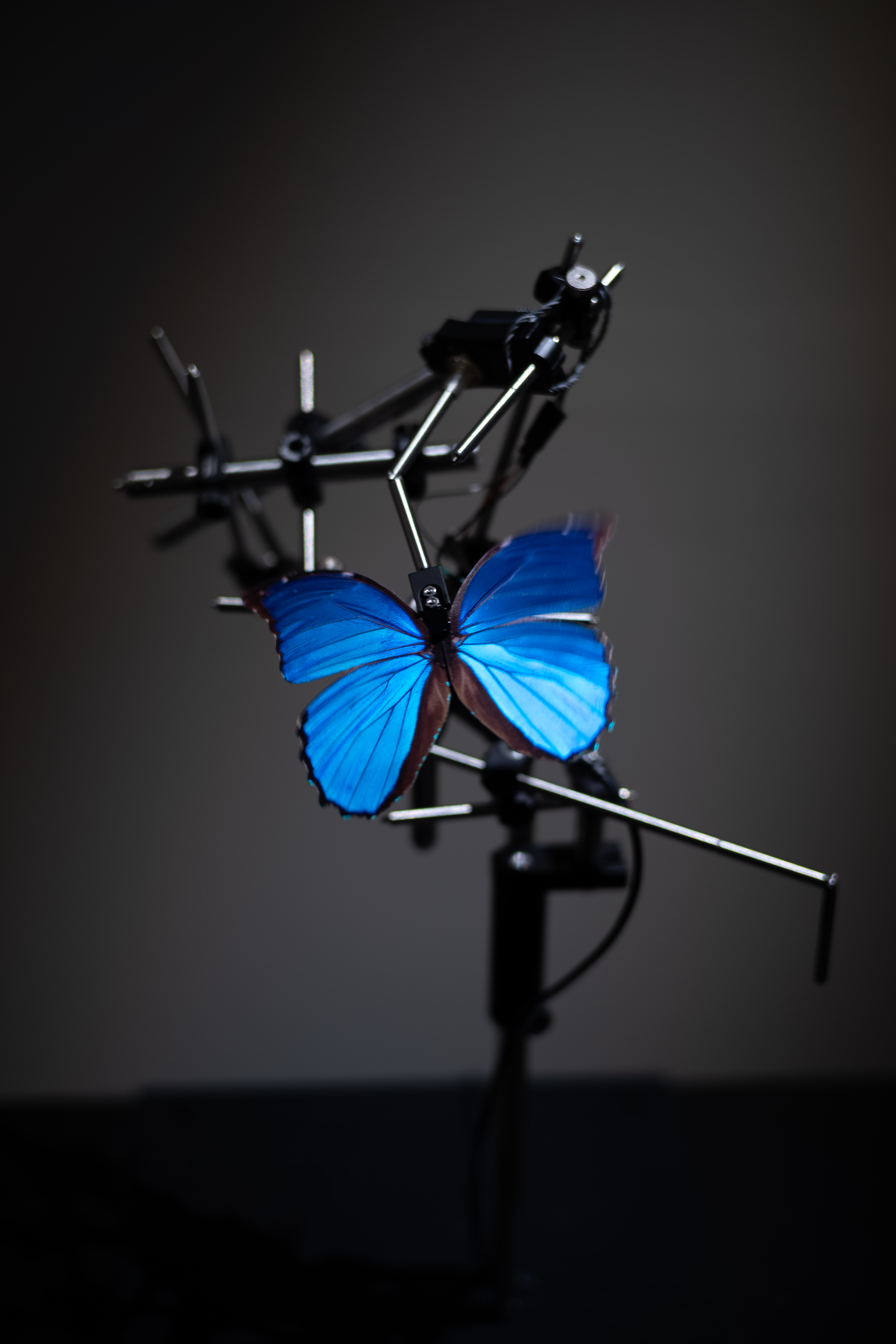
Artificial Morpho Butterfly

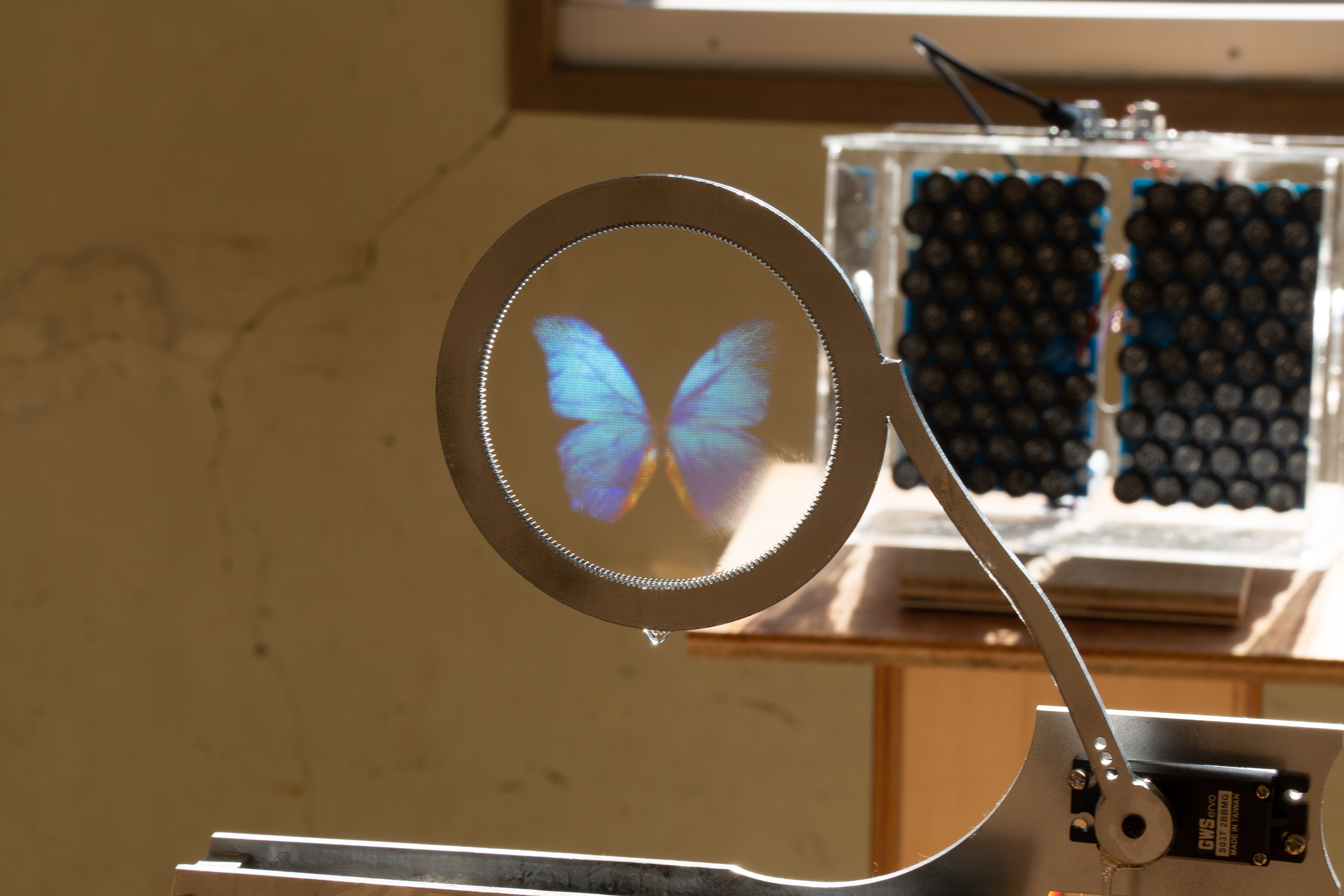
Colloidal display

Engaged in research with a vision of digital nature, he has been running his own 'Digital Nature Laboratory' at the University of Tsukuba since 2015, and has also been the director of the "Digital Nature Development Research Centre" since 2020. He specialises in media arts as well as 'human computer interaction' and applied fields using 'intelligent technology' and 'audio-visual technology'. application areas.

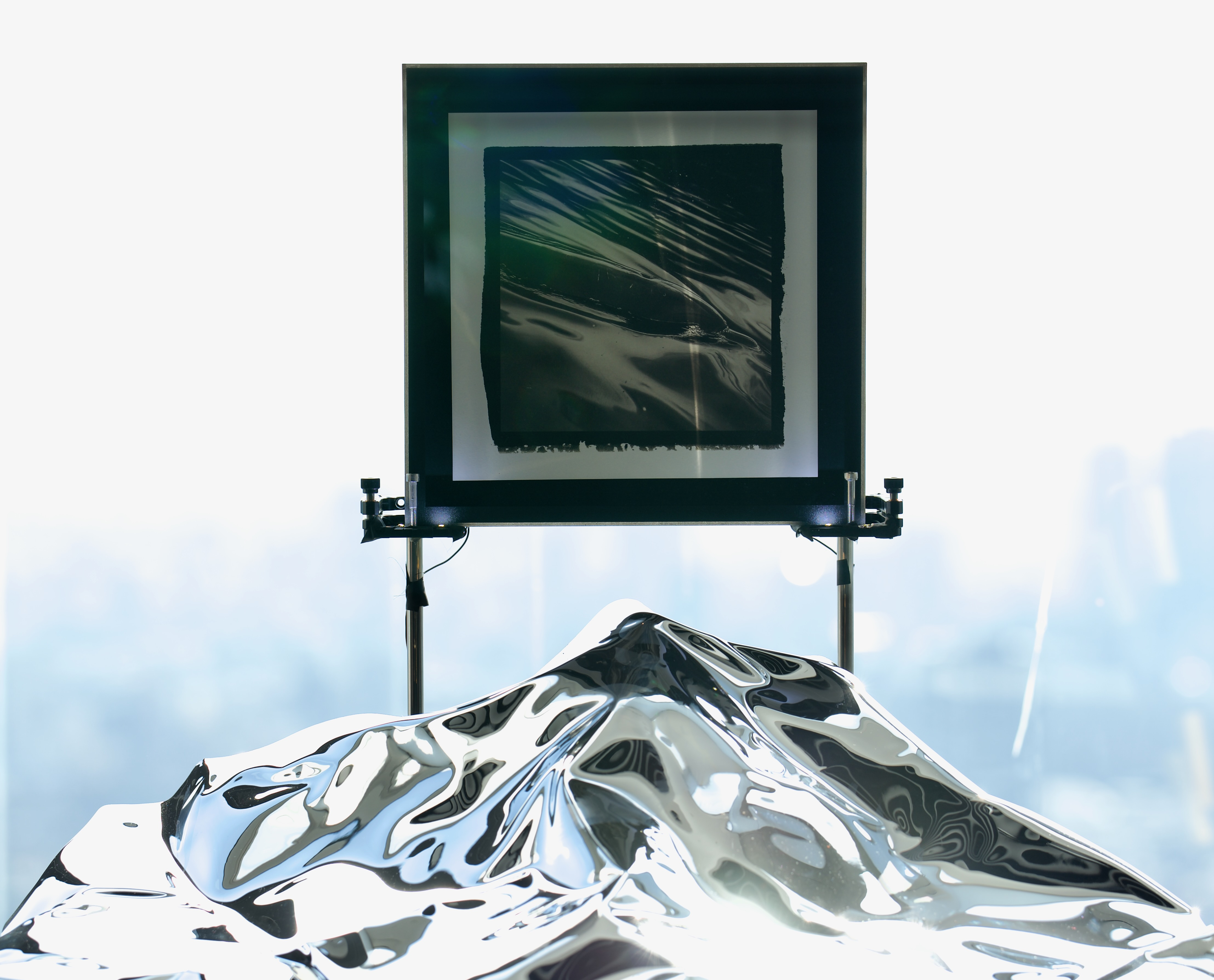
Landscape and Mass: 5. Salt and Silver

His publications in the laboratory are in the fields of human-computer interaction, virtual reality, aerial displays and spatial graphics, in the field of research on collaboration and co-creation between artificial intelligence and human intelligence, and in the fields of accessibility and diversity. As a researcher, he has received the World Technology Award and the Laval Virtual Award from Laval Virtual, Europe's largest VR festival, five times in four consecutive years.

=== xDiversity ===
JST CREST "Social Implementation of Spatial Viewing and Tactile Technology Based on Super AI Infrastructure for a Computational Diversity-enabled Society" xDiversity (cross-diversity) research representative , and as a general incorporated association xDiversity, working on projects to realise a diverse society that embraces the differences in human physical abilities. Projects such as automated wheelchairs, diversity-enabled entertainment (Concerts without Hearing by Ear) and walking with prosthetic legs (Otome Prosthetic Legs Project) and other projects aiming to adapt machine learning techniques to various bodily diversities.

=== Pixie Dust Technologies ===
Digital transformation of space and social implementation of university-originated technology company Pixie Dust Technologies was founded for the purpose of "commercialization of innovative products and meta-materials utilizing its proprietary HAGEN wave-control technology." Through research and development of human interface technology and computer simulation technology, the company has developed tactile speaker technology and metamaterial technology, digital transformation of construction sites and social implementation of technology, including BCP solutions for corona protection. Shares in the company were traded on the NASDAQ stock exchange in New York from August 2023 until the company went private in 2024.

=== null² ===
In 2025, Ochiai served as producer of null², a Signature Pavilion at Expo 2025 in Osaka. The pavilion employed mirror membranes and robotic actuation to create a responsive architectural environment, attracting over ten million area visitors during its 184-day run. A feature-length documentary, Farewell, Homosapiens (directed by Kosuke Mori), was subsequently produced and screened at the National Museum of Ethnology and the Museum of Contemporary Art Tokyo. A successor project, null⁴, is scheduled for GREEN×EXPO 2027 in Yokohama. See Null² for details.

=== Other activities ===
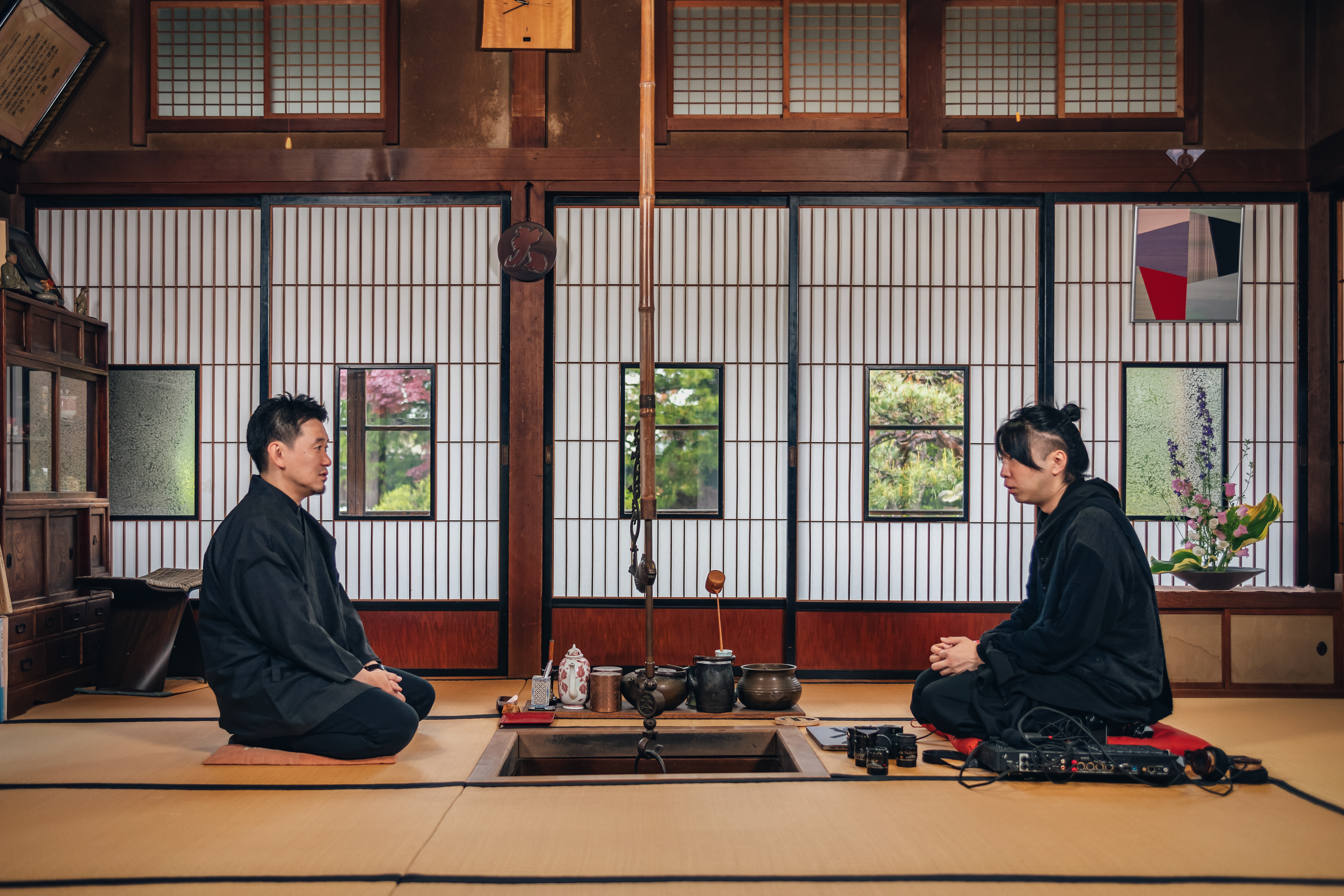
Ochiai visits Nitta Textile Arts workshop for Tohoku Project, Yonezawa, Yamagata (pictured with artisan Gentaro Nitta, 2024)

Ochiai hosts a live documentary discussion programme called The Weekly Ochiai. The show airs in Japan at 10:00 on Wednesdays on NewsPicks Studio and Fuji TV. Since the show's debut in 2017 it has broadcast over 300 episodes.

== Artworks ==
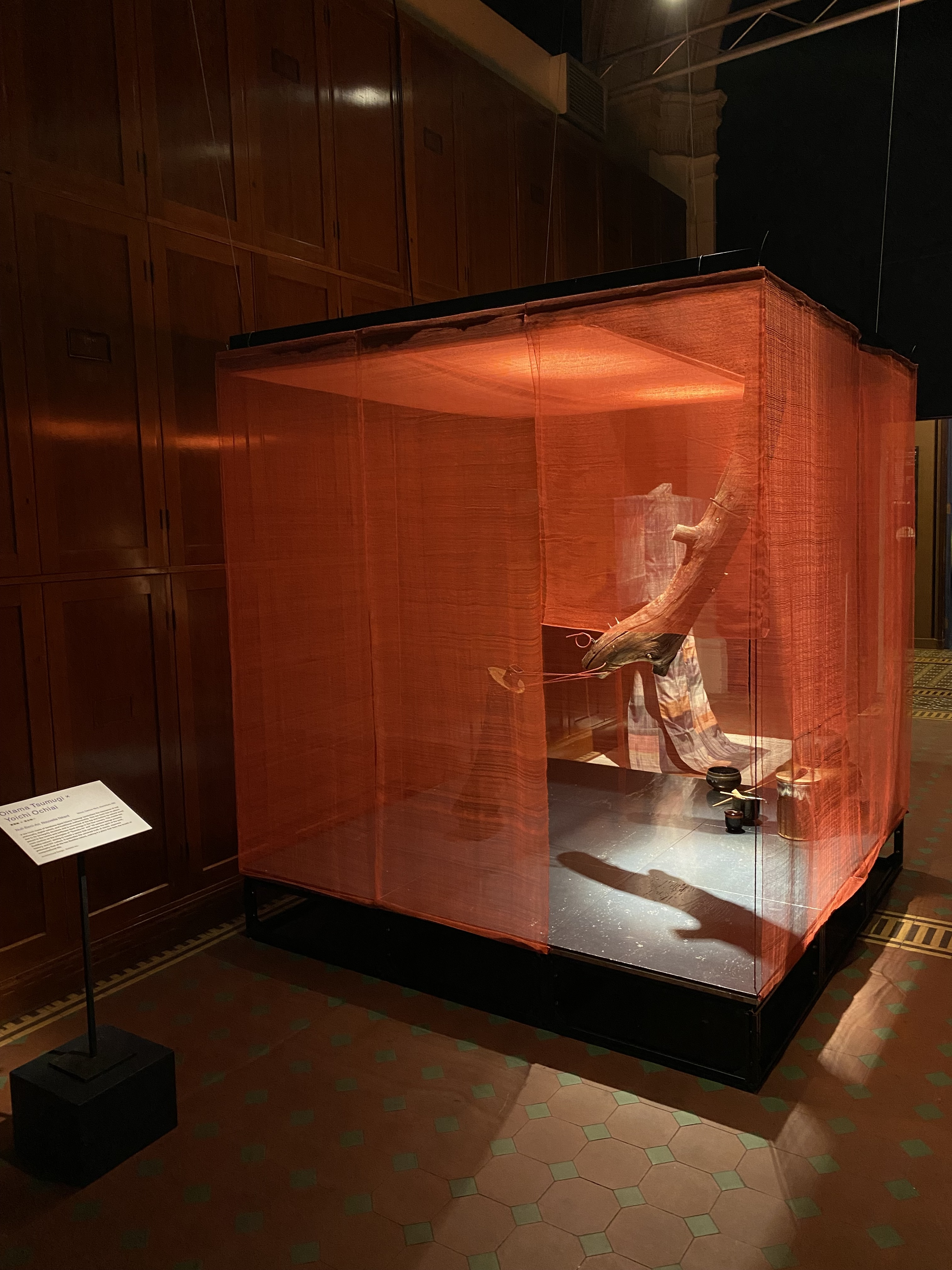
ヌベルニ庵 / Null-Beni-An / Nouvelle Néant by Yoichi Ochiai (with Oitama Tsumugi) exhibited in the Craft x Tech exhibition at the V&A, London (2024)

=== Solo exhibitions ===
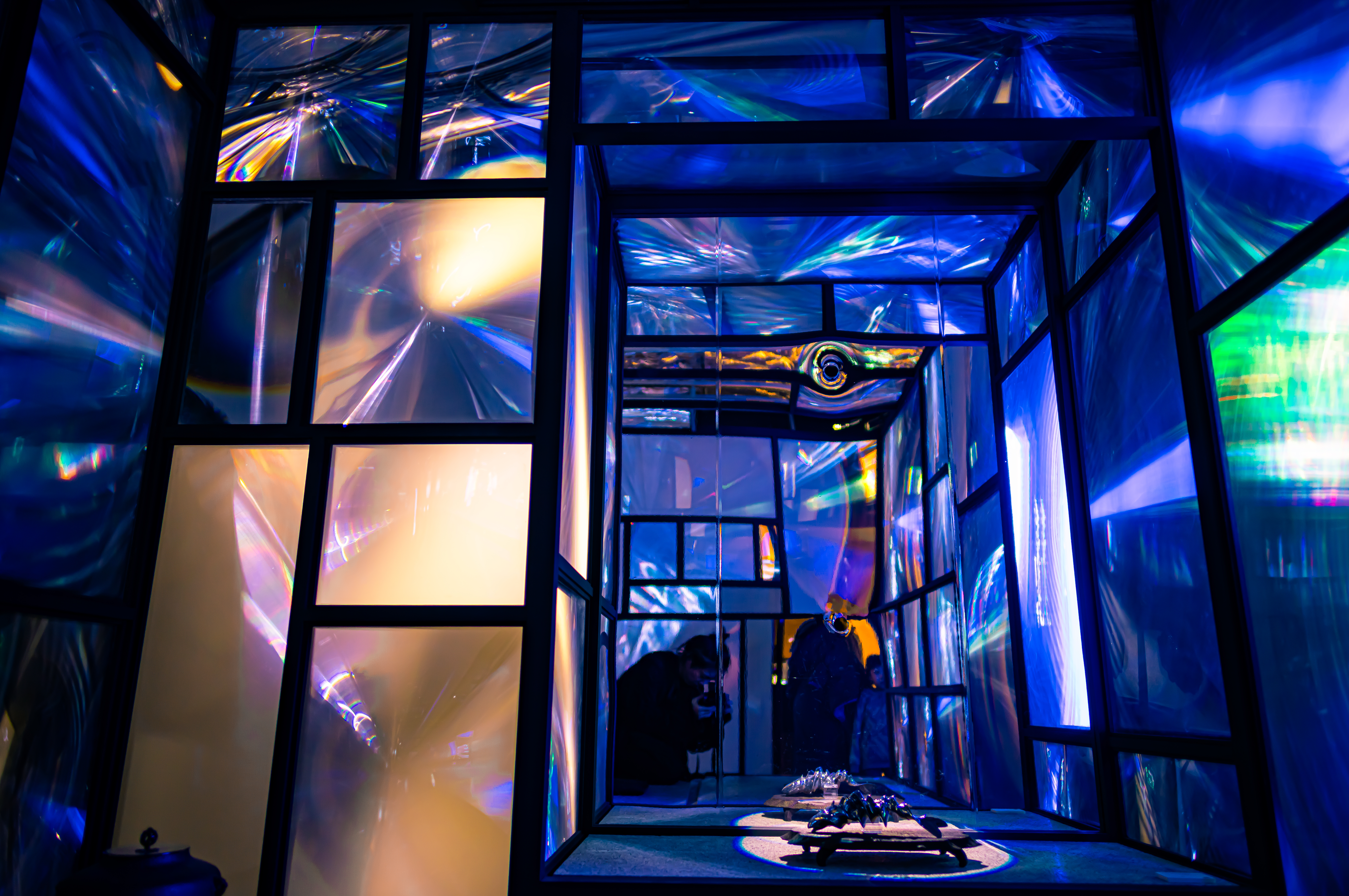
null-an: noise as silence ∽ silence as noise, Tokyo (2024)

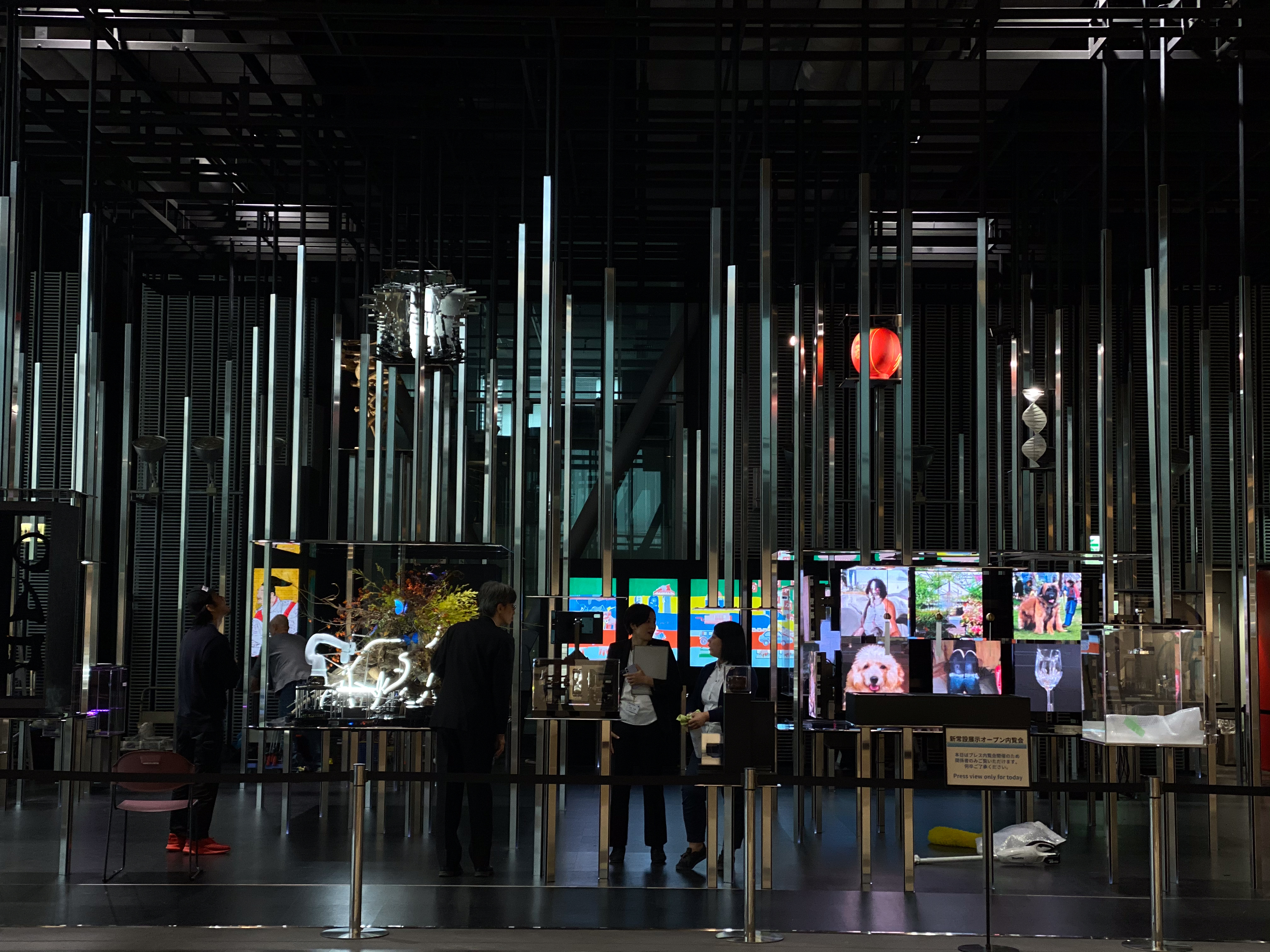
Naturally Digital and Digitally Natural, Tokyo (2020)

- Image and Matter (Dec. 2016 – Jan. 2017 / Kuala Lumpur, Malaysia)
- Imago et Materia (Mar. – Apr. 2017 / Roppongi, Tokyo)
- Japanese Technium Exhibition (Apr. – May. 2017 / Kioicho, Tokyo)
- Yoichi Ochiai: Beauty of Natural Resolution End to End Transformation of Material Things Digital Nature (Apr. – Jun. 2018 / Omotesando, Tokyo)
- Sehnsucht nach Masse 2019 (Jan. 24 – Feb. 6, 2019 / Higashi-Shinagawa, Tokyo)
- Ruminating with the Spirituality 2019 (Sep. 5 – Oct. 12, 2019 / Tokyo, Ginza Leica Store)
- Rinkou Suru Reisei (Oct. 5 – Oct. 27, 2019 / Tokyo, The Shop Yohji Yamamoto)
- Reminiscence of the Unknown, Image and Matter || Digitally Natural, Naturally Digital || Sehnsucht nach Masse (Jul. 23 (Thu) – Aug. 31 (Sun), 2020 / Shibuya Modi, Tokyo)
- Bukka: Transformation of Material Things (Feb. 5 – Feb. 28, 2021 / Experimental Gallery, Hong Kong Arts Centre, Hong Kong)
- Perspective of umwet Time and Space, Digital Nature and Arts (Apr. 28 – May. 30, 2021 / Kitakyushu Museum of Life and Travel)
- The transformation of material things into a living forest -Digital Nature- Exhibition in Daigoji Temple (Nov. 21 – Dec. 5, 2021 / Kyoto, Daigoji Temple)
- Special project for the 55th anniversary of the Kusakabe Mingeikan Kick-off event for Yoichi Ochiai's exhibition 'Media and Mingei – Nodal point seen in the post-corona'. (Dec. 13 – Dec. 26, 2021 / Gifu, Kusakabe Folk Museum)
- Re-Digitalisation of Waves (Jan. 28 – Feb. 13, 2022 / Osaka, Osaka Kansai International Art Festival)
- Yoichi Ochiai Ubiquitous Existence of Bodies, Interwoven Time and Space – Returning to the Ring, Carbon, Digital, Ideological and Narrative Forms – (Apr.9 – May.22,2022 / Gifu, Kusakabe Mingeikan)
- Nakedness and Materiality (Apr.16 – May.1, 2022 / Tokyo, Kitamura Photography Studio)
- "Null soku ze shiki shiki soku ze nuru" (Sep.28 – Oct.11, 2022 / Hankyu Men's Building, Tokyo)
- Yoichi Ochiai "Hare Tokidoki Leica ── Gyakugyaku-takari-koudou" (Sep.1 – Oct.29, 2023 /Tokyo, Leica Gallery Tokyo)
- Yoichi Ochiai "Hare Tokidoki Leica ── Shituryou-heno-syoukei, Ramen-wa-kazenoyouni" (Sep.2 – Oct.29, 2023 / Kyoto, Leica Gallery Kyoto)
- Phantom Resonance: Nocturnal Assembly of Ethereal Beings and Digital Nature（Sep.3 – Oct.15, 2023 / Kyoto, Daigoji Temple)
- Digital Nature, Existence from null to null: Encoded Eternity, Object-Oriented Primal Vow (Sep.17 – Nov.5, 2023 / Gifu, Kusakabe Folk Museum])
- Resonance of Null: Interconnection of Sunyata in Digital Nature (Oct.22 – Dec.20, 2023 / Yamanashi, Kiyoharu Art Colony, Ando Tadao / Museum of Light)
- From null, all phenomena randomly emerge: As vessels bridge waters, so null becomes form, as light dispels darkness, so reveals digital nature. (Nov.29 – Oct.15, 2023 – Jan. 14, 2024 / Tokyo, Light Seed Gallery)
- null-an: noise as silence ∽ silence as noise (Jan.13 – Mar.17, 2024 / Tokyo, Azabudai Hills, Gallery & Restaurant Butaiura)
- Yoichi Ochiai "Phantom Resonance of nulled cherry blossoms" (Feb.27 – Mar.24, 2024 / Tokyo, Shibuya Sakura Stage)
- Smooth Ontology and Resonating Objects: Digital Nature of Material Transformation – Esoteric World in Differentiable Ontology (Jul.24 – Aug.22, 2024 / Osaka, Nakanoshima Museum of Art)
- Divine Duality: Sushi, Null, and the Eel Dragon in Edo's Cyclical Time and Space (Sep.7 – Oct.27, 2024 / Tokyo, BAG-Brillia Art Gallery)
- Animistic Randomness from the Divine Null: Eeny, Meeny, Miny, Moe – Circle, Mandala, Triangle – (Sep.14 – Nov.4, 2024 / Gifu, Kusakabe Mingeikan)
- Do Tenugui Dream of Cracked LCDs? (Sep.21 – Nov.21, 2024 / Kyoto, Hosotsuji Ihee Museum)
- Weightless Reminiscences: The Sonority of Machines in Reversed Gravity (Oct.12 – Nov.8, 2024 / Hokkaido, BiVi Shin Sapporo)
- The Tetralemma of Null: A Human Story Inducted into Signs – Retrospective (Jun.28 – Sep.15, 2025 / Gifu, Kusakabe Mingeikan)
- Amanoson Kaerutte yo? (Jul. 11 – Sept. 23, 2026 / Kagoshima, Kirishima Open Air Museum)

=== Group exhibitions ===
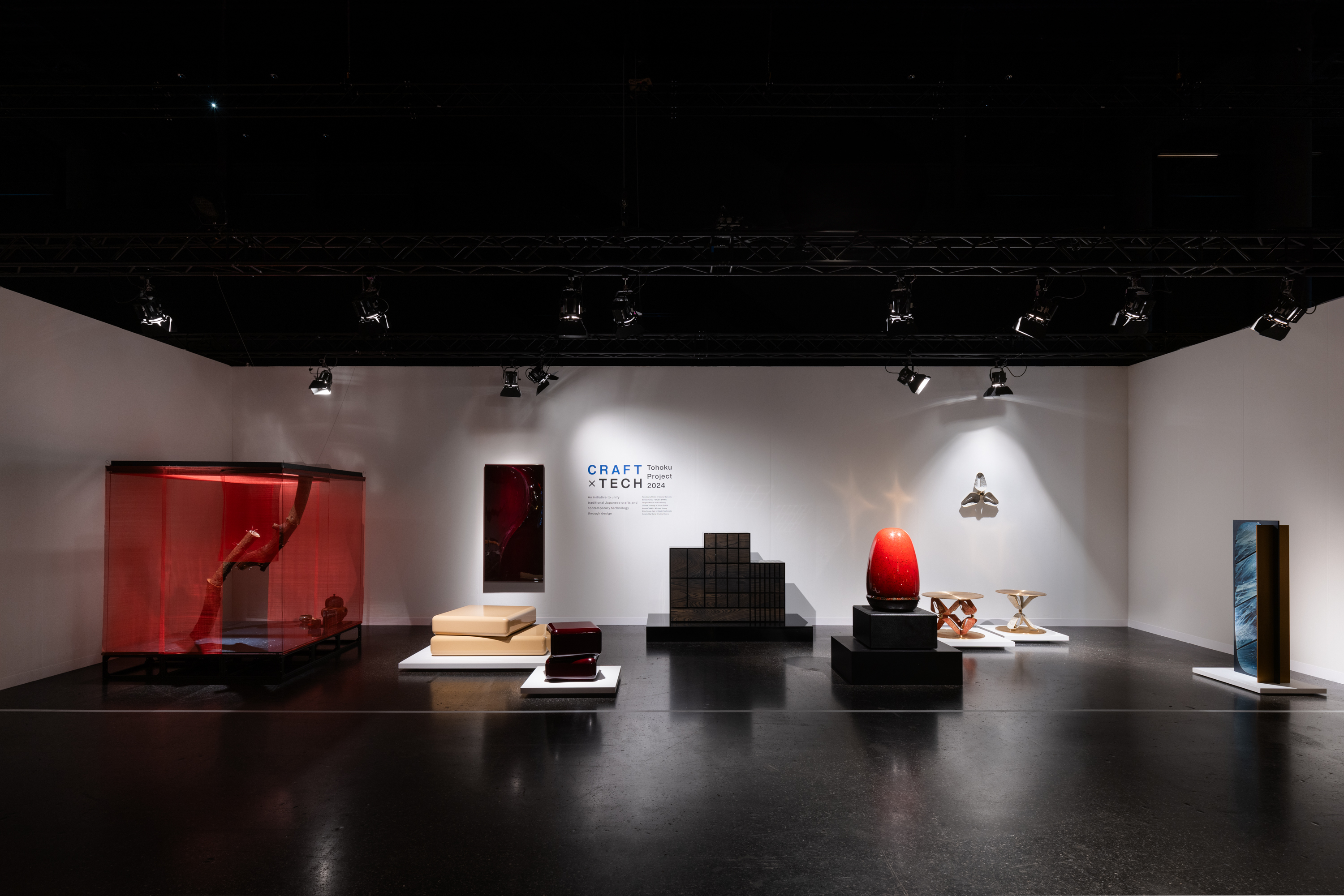
Craft x Tech Tohoku Project at Design Miami Art Basel (2024)

- SIGGRAPH Art Gallery 2014 (July, 2014 / Canada, Vancouver)
- Ars Electronica Festival 2015 (September, 2015 / Austria, Linz)
  - ~ 2016 (September, 2016 / Austria, Linz)
  - ~ 2017 (September, 2017 / Austria, Linz)
  - ~ 2018 (September, 2018 / Austria, Linz)
  - ~ 2019 (September, 2019 / Austria, Linz)
  - ~ 2020 (September, 2020 / online)
  - ~ 2021 (September, 2021 / Austria, Linz)
- KENPOKU ART 2016 (Sep.17－Nov.20, 2016 / Japan, Ibaraki)
- Media Ambition Tokyo 2017 (Feb.11 – Mar.12, 2017 / Tokyo)
  - ~ 2018 (Feb.9 – Feb.25, 2018 / Tokyo)
  - ~ 2019 (Feb.23 – Mar.3, 2019 / Tokyo)
  - ~ 2020 (Feb.28 – Mar.8, 2020 / Tokyo)
  - ~ 2021 (Apr.27 – May 23, 2021 / Tokyo)
- AI More Than Human (May 2019 / London, Barbican Centre)
- Cherish, your imagination (Jul.18－ Sep.27, 2020 / Japan, Museum of Contemporary Art Tokyo)
- The Material -Its Form and Spirit (November, 2020 / gallery de kasuga)
- Fluctuation -be with light- (May 14 – Jun.22, 2022 / kōjin kyoto)
- Sunbeam of null in forest (Sunbeam of null in forest)(Jun.9 – Jul.8, 2022 / Tokyo, Otemachi)
- Yoichi Ochiai x Shinichi Wakasa, Guwa Guwa Null Null: Circumscribing the Invisible Borderline From the Forest (Sep.1 – Sep.25, 2022 / Tokyo・Commons Tokyo)
- Fuji Textile Week 2022(Nov.23 – Dec.11, 2022 / Japan, Fujiyoshida-City)
- Study:Osaka Kansai International Art Festival 2023 (Jan.28 – Feb.13, 2023 / Osaka)
- elective affinities Part I (Jan.28 – Mar.5, 2023 / Tokyo, agnès b. b.Gallery Boutique)
- Utsutsu – A Liminalism Of Japanese Contemporary Art (Feb.24 – Apr.30, 2023 / Boston, Pellas Gallery)
- Harmonics of the Unseen: Phantom Resonance in Higashi-Osaka (Nov.3 – 4, 2023 / Osaka)
- MOT Annual 2023: Synergy, Between Creation and Generation (Dec.2, 2023 – Mar.3, 2024 / Tokyo, Museum of Contemporary Art Tokyo)
- Akihabara UDX winter illumination 2023 Reflector∞:Resonance of Electrical Echoes (Nov.15, – Dec.25, 2023 / Tokyo・AkihabaraUDX)
- Craft x Tech Tohoku Project 2024 (with Oitama-Tsumugi) (May 24–25, 2024 / Kudan House, Tokyo)
- DESIGN MIAMI.BASEL 2024 (Jun. 10–16, 2024 / Basel, Switzerland)
- Harmony with Nature (Aug.2 – 18, 2024 / Tokyo, Kasai Rinkai Park)
- TSUBUGUMUSEUM (Aug.30 – Sep.8, 2024 / Tokyo, Capital Harajuku)
- London Design Festival (Sept. 12 Oct.–13, 2024 / Prince Consort Gallery, V&A South Kensington, London)
- TSUBUGUMUSEUM PREMIUM (Nov.8 – Dec.8, 2024 / Aichi, THE TOWER HOTEL NAGOYA)
- Entangle Moment: [Quantum / Ocean / Universe] x Art (Aug.14 – Aug.20, 2025 / Osaka, Expo 2025 EXPO Messe "WASSE")
- Mirrored Gate of Emergence (Aug.23 – Sep.7, 2025 / Omotesando, Tokyo)
- Antipode: To You, Far Away – 130th Anniversary of Japan-Brazil Diplomatic Relations (Oct.8, 2025 – Jan.25, 2026 / Sesc Vila Mariana, Sao Paulo, Brazil)
- Mission Infinity: Universe + Quantum + Art (Jan.31 – May 6, 2026 / Tokyo, Museum of Contemporary Art Tokyo)

=== Performance Art ===
- Human Code Ensemble (Nov.3 – 4, 2022 / Kanagawa, Kanagawa Prefectural Music Hall)
- Yoichi Ochiai and Tsuji. Sculpting the Life with Sound and Light – Sculpture for the Digital Nature and Life – (Nov.5, 2022 / Osaka, Hanazono Rugby Stadium)
- TAKUHIMATSURI (Nov.18, 2022 / Nigata, Sado)
- Piano Fes Yoichi Ochiai × Kae Ogawa Keisanki to Kogakki de Kanaderu Ongakkai ~Mirai eno Tuioku~ (May 21, 2023 / Gifu, Salamanca Hall)
- Digital，Kogakki, Sen no Rikyū. ~Keisanki to Kogakki de Kanaderu Atarashii Ongakkai~ (Mar.30, 2024 / Osaka, Fenice sacay)
- Calculation of the Soul: Melody of Spirituality (Feb.2, 2025 / Ishikawa, Kanazawa City Art Hall)

== Books ==
=== Paper ===
- Google Scholar Yoichi Ochiai

=== Single author ===
- MAHONOSEIKI (PLANETS, 2015)

Computers were developed 70 years ago. The period characterized by shared screen media has been followed by a period where media is integrated into the environment. Yoichi Ochiai, a researcher and media artist, discusses changes in technology and art. The work examines how computers interact with physical objects outside of digital screens.

- digital nature: seitaikei wo nasu hanshinkasita keisanki ni yoru wabi to sabi (PLANETS, 2018)

A sufficiently advanced computational group is indistinguishable from nature--. Digital Nature, that is the vision and manifesto of the future proposed by Yoichi Ochiai. Postmodernity and Singularity are only one element of this 'new nature'. Human beings and society are undeniably being renewed. It will bring about a redefinition of happiness, of the economy and of democratic politics. The new paradigm starts here: ......! 'We can create a world without 'gates' and 'seams', replace standardisation with diversity, and transcend the obsessions of human nature, such as individual happiness and insecurity, through technology. All we need is a vision and a passion for the future towards which technology is heading." (From the Afterword)

=== Other major publications ===
- Korekara no Sekai wo Tsukuru Nakamatachi e (To Our Fellow Builders of the Coming World) (Shogakukan, 2016)
- Nihon Saiko Senryaku (Japan Revitalisation Strategy) (Gentosha, 2018)
- Nihon Shinkaron (Japan Evolution Theory) (SB Creative, 2019)
- 2030-nen no Sekai Chizu-cho (World Atlas 2030: New Economy, SDGs, and a Vision for the Future) (SB Creative, 2019)
- Shitsuryou eno Shokei (Sehnsucht nach Masse) (Amana, 2019) – photography book
- Hanpo Saki wo Yomu Shikoho (Thinking Method for Reading Half a Step Ahead) (Shinchosha, 2021)
- Zoom Back x Ochiai (NHK Publishing, 2022)
- Wasureru Dokusho (Forgetting Reading) (PHP Shinsho, 2022)
- Hare Tokidoki Leica (Bungeishunju, 2023) – photography book
- Generative AI ga Kaeru Mirai (The Future Changed by Generative AI) (Fusosha, 2024) – editor
- Neko demo Wakaru Seiseikai (Generative AI Even a Cat Can Understand) (Fusosha, 2025)
- Nami to Kei (Waves and Scenery) (Kadokawa Shoten, 2025)
- Ochiai Yoichi x Kusakabe Mingeikan Works 2021—2025 (Fusosha, 2025)
- Matagi Drive: Datsu-ningen-chisei-teki Bunmeiron (Matagi Drive: A Post-Human-Intelligence Civilisation Theory at the Periphery of Digital Nature) (PLANETS, 2026)

=== Co-authored ===
- Shizukana Kakumei e no Blueprint (A Blueprint for a Quiet Revolution) (with Toshiyuki Inoko) (Kawade Shobo Shinsha, 2014)
- 10-nen-go no Shigoto Zukan (Work Atlas in 10 Years) (with Takafumi Horie) (SB Creative, 2018)
- Datsu Kindai Sengen (Post-Modernity Declaration) (with Takashi Shimizu, Sekai Kozuma) (Suiseisha, 2018)
- Nippon 2021—2050 (with Naoki Inose) (Kadokawa, 2018)
- Yogen Sareta Sekai (The Prophesied World) (with Nobuhiko Ochiai) (Shogakukan, 2022)
- xDiversity to iu Kanosei no Chosen (The Challenge of the Possibility Called xDiversity) (Kodansha, 2023)
- 2035-nen no Ningen no Joken (The Human Condition in 2035) (with Jun Rekimoto) (Magazine House Shinsho, 2024)
- "Suki" wo Issho no "Tsuyomi" ni Kaeru Sodatekata (Raising Children by Turning "Love" into Lifelong "Strength") (with Hiromi Ochiai) (Sunmark Publishing, 2025)
- Zenkoku Goshuin Daizukan (National Goshuin Encyclopedia) (with Shuma Shimizu) (SB Creative, 2025)
- Reiwa Nihon wo Design Suru (Designing Reiwa Japan) (with Akinari Senzaki) (Bunshun Shinsho, 2026)

== Awards ==
=== Individual ===
- IPA Super Creator / Genius Programmer certification (July 2010, Information-technology Promotion Agency)
- ACM UIST Student Innovation Contest 2nd Prize (October 2010)
- University of Tsukuba President's Award (March 2011)
- Springer Diamond Award for Best Research (November 2013, ACE)
- Laval Virtual Award
  - Grand Prix du Jury & Interface and Multipurpose Equipment (April 2014)
  - Interface and Multipurpose Equipment (April 2015)
  - Interface and Multipurpose Equipment (March 2016)
- World Technology Award (November 2015)
- 1st World OMOSIROI Award (2015, Knowledge Capital)
- WIRED Creative Hack Award Grand Prix (November 2015)
- Asia Digital Art Award, Excellence Prize (December 2015)
- Prix Ars Electronica Honorary Mention (May 2016)
- STARTS Prize Honorary Mention (June 2016)
- STARTS Prize Nominated (June 2018)
- St. Gallen Symposium Leaders of Tomorrow & 40 Knowledge Pool (May 2017)
- SXSW Creative Experience ARROW Awards, Best Immersive Experience (March 2019)
- MIT Technology Review Innovators Under 35 Japan (January 2021)
- PMI Future 50 (June 2021)
- Apollo Magazine 40 UNDER 40 ART AND TECH (September 2021)
- World Economic Forum Young Global Leaders (April 2022)
- MEXT Young Scientists' Award (文部科学大臣表彰 若手科学者賞) (April 2023)
- U-Can Buzzwords-of-the-Year Award for "Generative AI" (December 2023)
- ASIAGRAPH Takumi Award (November 2024)
- MEXT Science and Technology Award (Public Understanding Promotion Category) (文部科学大臣表彰 科学技術賞（理解増進部門）) (April 2025)
- WIRED Innovation Award 2025 (September 2025)
- Pen CREATOR AWARDS 2025 (December 2025)
- AMD Award, Service Award (功労賞) (March 2026)
- G1 Award (2026)

=== Project and organisational awards ===
- Good Design Award (2014, 2015, 2021)
- Japan Media Arts Festival, Jury Recommended Works – Art Division and Entertainment Division (2017, 2020)
- Spikes Asia Bronze (October 2017)
- Dentsu Advertising Award, Innovative Approach Grand Prize and Special Prize (May 2019)
- Cannes Lions, Music Bronze / SDGs Shortlist (June 2019)
- CES Innovation Award 2023 and 2024 (for Pixie Dust Technologies products)
- METI IP Meritorious Service Award (知財功労賞 経済産業大臣表彰) (April 2022, for Pixie Dust Technologies)
- Japan Space Design Award 2025, Silver Prize (for null²)
- Taipei Design Award 2025, Grand Prix (for null²)
- Minna-no-Kenchiku-Taisho (みんなの建築大賞, People's Architecture Grand Prize) (February 2026, for null²)
