= Null² =

Signature pavilion at Expo 2025

null²
- ヌルヌル (Nurunuru)
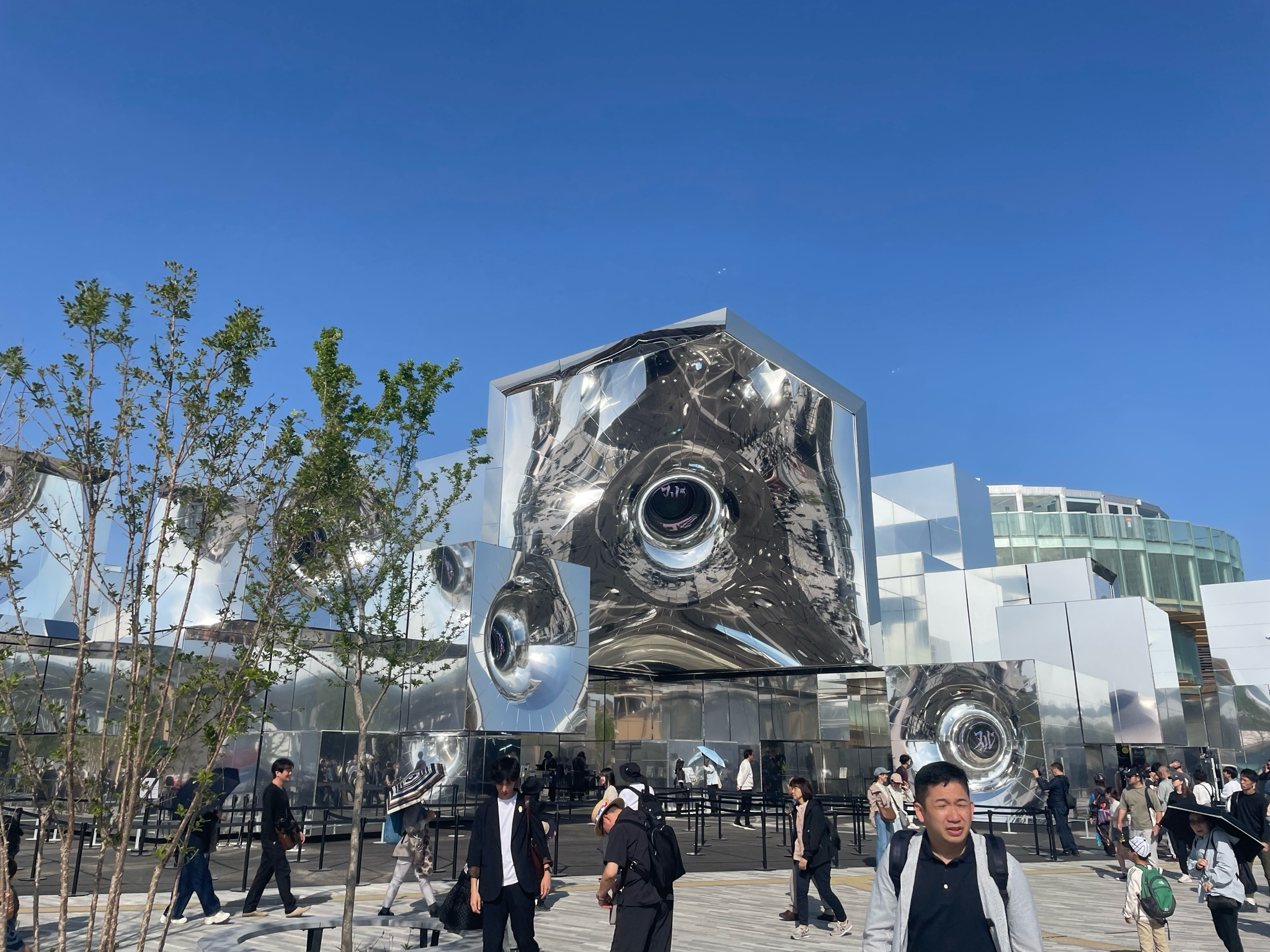
- The exterior of the pavilion during Expo 2025
- Interactive map of the null² area

General information
- Status: Completed
- Type: Pavilion (exhibition)
- Location: (Japan) Osaka, Konohana, Yumeshima Island
- Completed: January 2025
- Opening: April 13, 2025
- Owner: Japan Association for the 2025 World Exposition

Height
- Height: 12.25 m (40.2 ft)

Technical details
- Floor area: 655.46 m^{2} (7,055.3 sq ft)

Design and construction
- Architects: Yoichi Ochiai (Producer / Overall design director (exterior & interior)); NOIZ (Architectural design); Asratec (Robotics); WOW (Interior exhibition) raw (Exterior video)

Website
- expo2025.digitalnatureandarts.or.jp

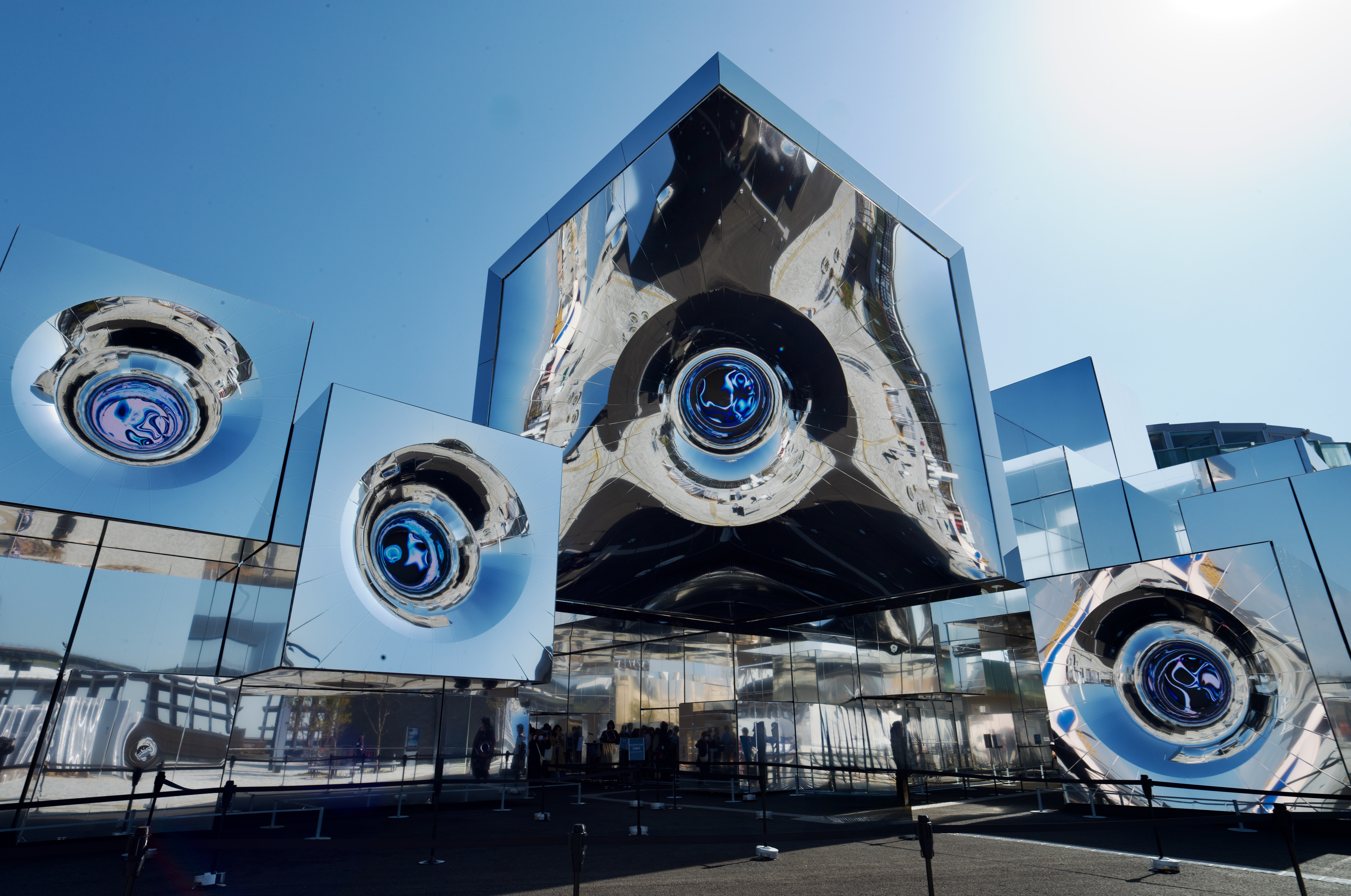
Exterior of the Signature Pavilion null² by Yoichi Ochiai at Expo 2025

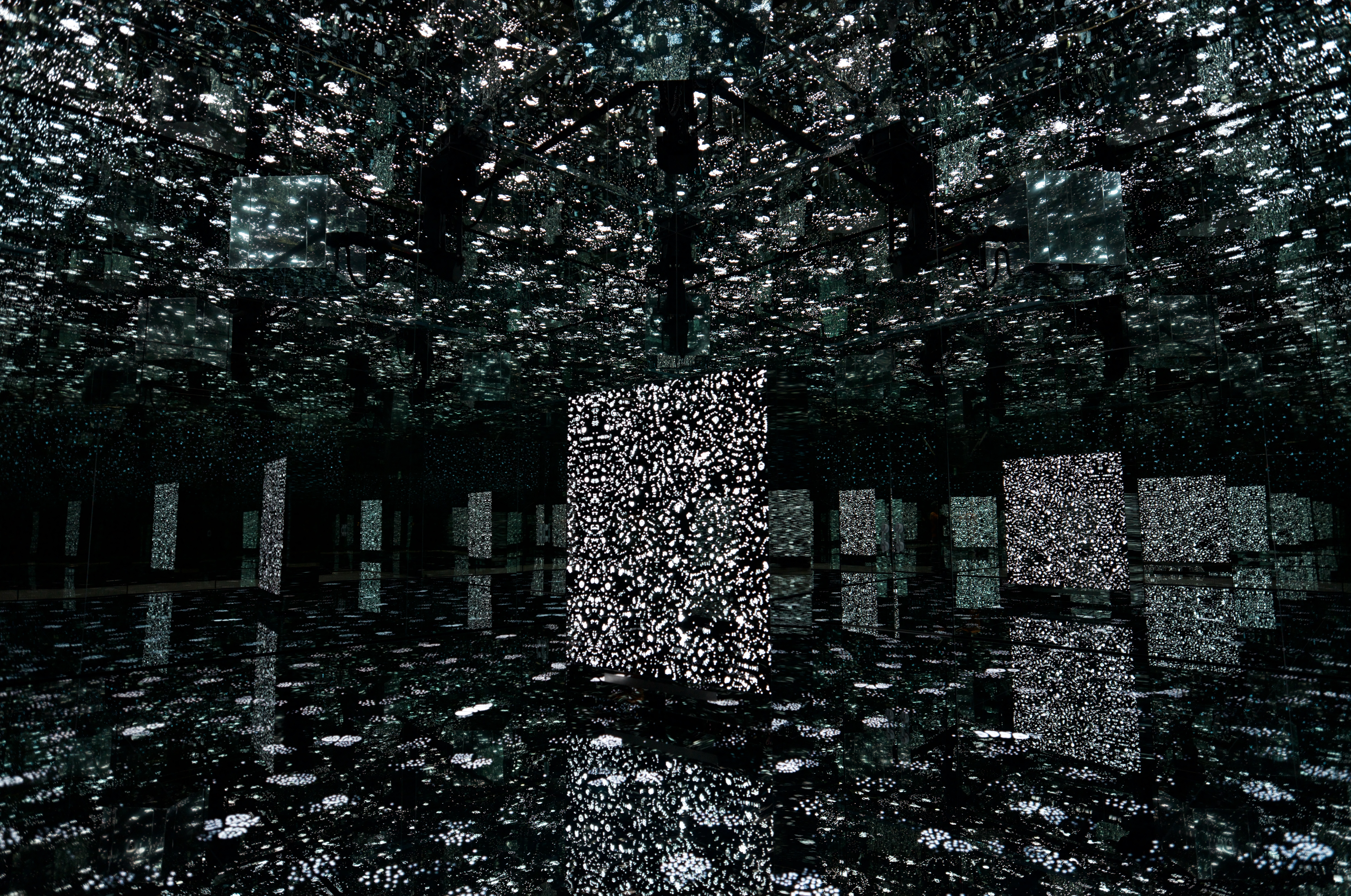
Interior of null², Expo 2025 Osaka, Kansai (2025)

null² (Japanese: ヌルヌル, pronounced Nurunuru) was a Signature Pavilion at the Expo 2025 Osaka, Kansai, Japan, held on Yumeshima Island in Osaka. It was produced by media artist Yoichi Ochiai as part of the official thematic projects of the Japan Association for the 2025 World Exposition.

The pavilion was located at the centre of the Expo grounds as one of the eight Signature Pavilions in the Signature Zone. It was designed and built under the thematic project "Polishing Lives" (いのちを磨く), one of the eight official thematic projects of Expo 2025.

The pavilion's conceptual masterplan, authored by Ochiai in December 2020, envisioned the structure as both a transformable sculptural architecture and an immersive media-art installation that would realise his long-standing concept of "Digital Nature".

== Signature Pavilions ==
The Signature Pavilions were conceived as the symbolic thematic projects of Expo 2025. Eight experts from different fields were appointed as thematic project producers and asked to interpret the Expo theme, "Designing Future Society for Our Lives" (いのち輝く未来社会のデザイン), from their own philosophical viewpoints and to construct pavilions as "signature works" that would transmit these visions to future generations.

Null² was one of these eight Signature Pavilions and represented Ochiai's interpretation of the thematic project "Polishing Lives".

== Name and project overview ==
The pavilion's name, "null²", combines the programming term "null"—representing an empty or undefined state—with the Buddhist concept of "emptiness" (空, śūnyatā). The title alludes in particular to the famous phrase "form is emptiness, emptiness is form" (Literary Chinese: 色即是空、空即是色) from the Heart Sutra, in which the character 空 ("emptiness") appears twice; this doubling is reflected in the "²" of "null²".

The name "null²" was first publicly announced in April 2022 in a press release presenting the basic plan for the Expo's thematic projects.

Ochiai had previously created a series of works dealing with null, Buddhism, mirrors, transformation and moving images, often using a thin reflective "mirror membrane". Earlier experiments included floating mirror membranes and magnetically levitated membranes developed from around 2018, and later, larger-scale works such as Null-an (ヌル庵, 2024) and Mirror Portal of Emergence (2025). In his 2023 solo exhibition Resonance of null: Interconnections of Emptiness in Digital Nature at the Museum of Light, Kiyoharu Art Village, the piece Null 1.6180025 (2023) was positioned as an experimental implementation of the moving exterior of null².

=== Related works ===
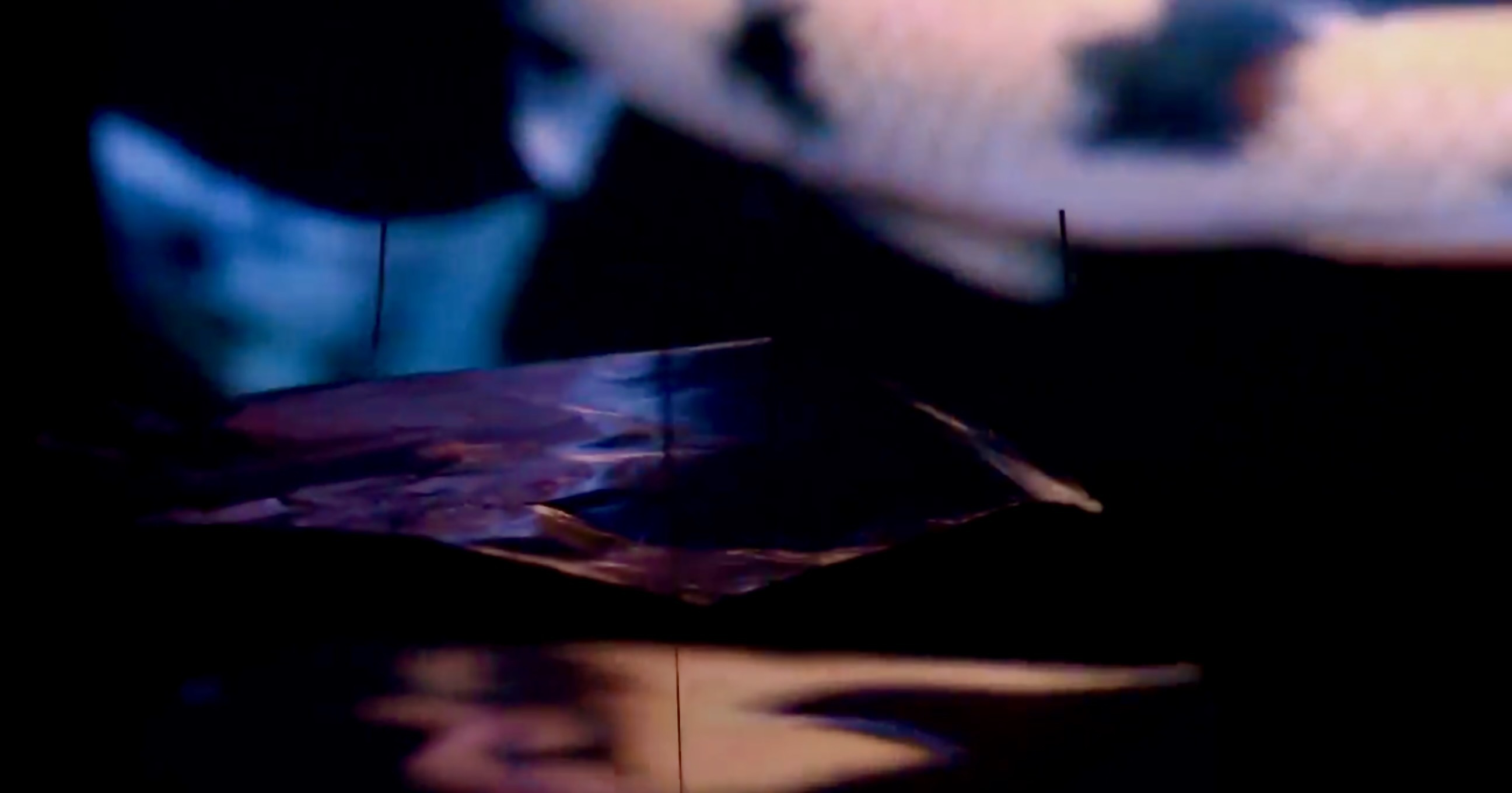
Silverfloats (plane) (2018)

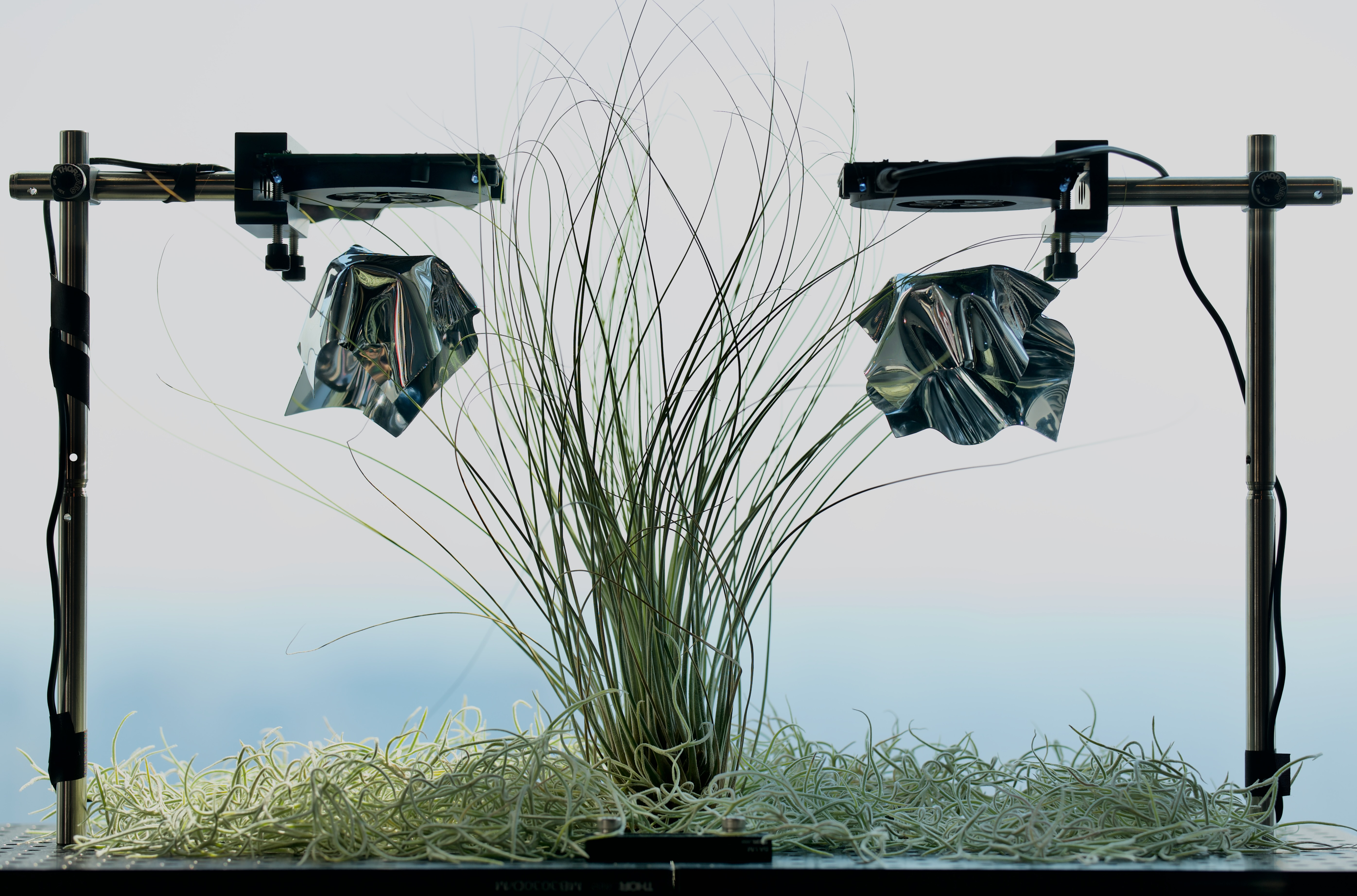
Wave-shaped Mirror (2019)

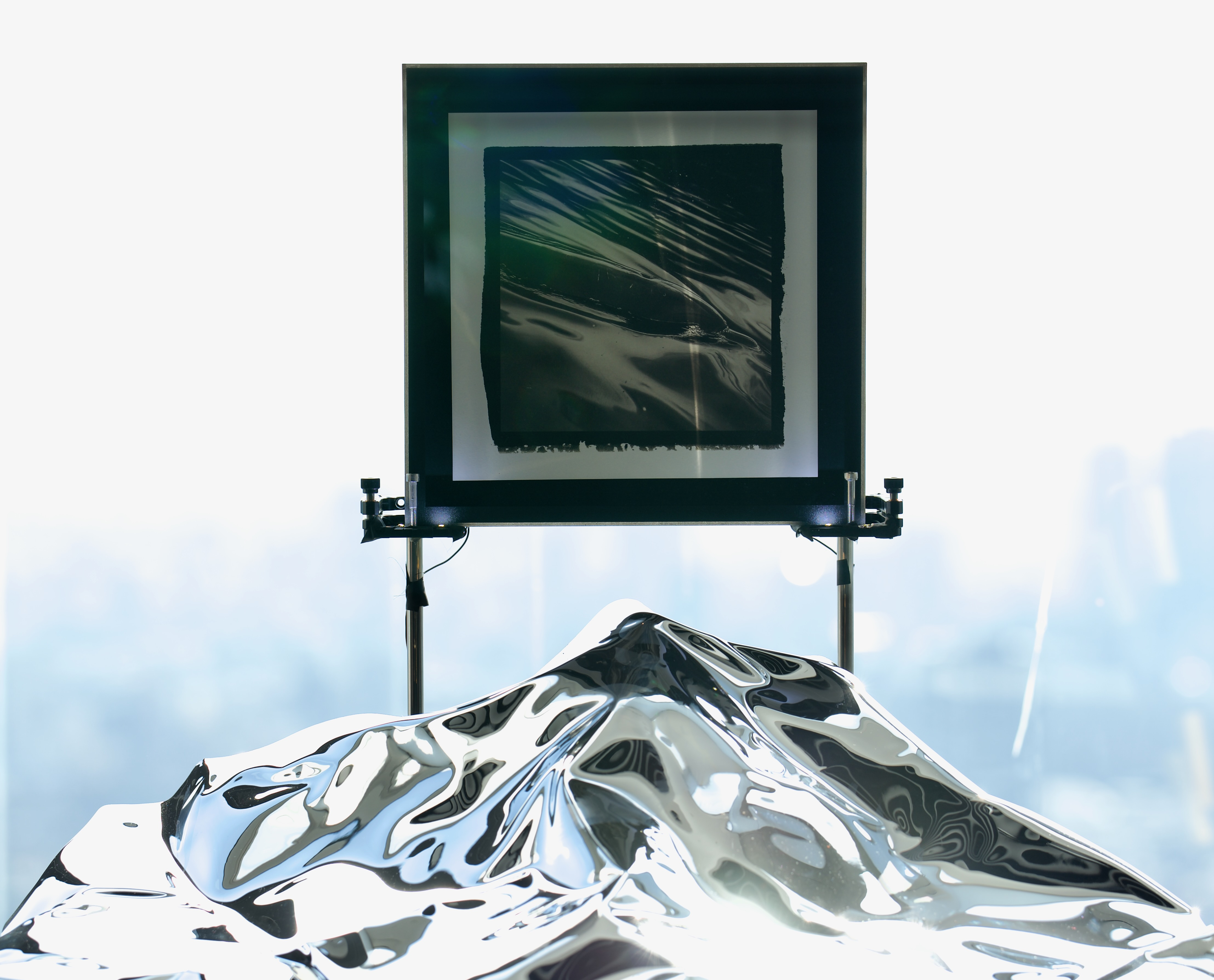
Salt and Silver (2019)

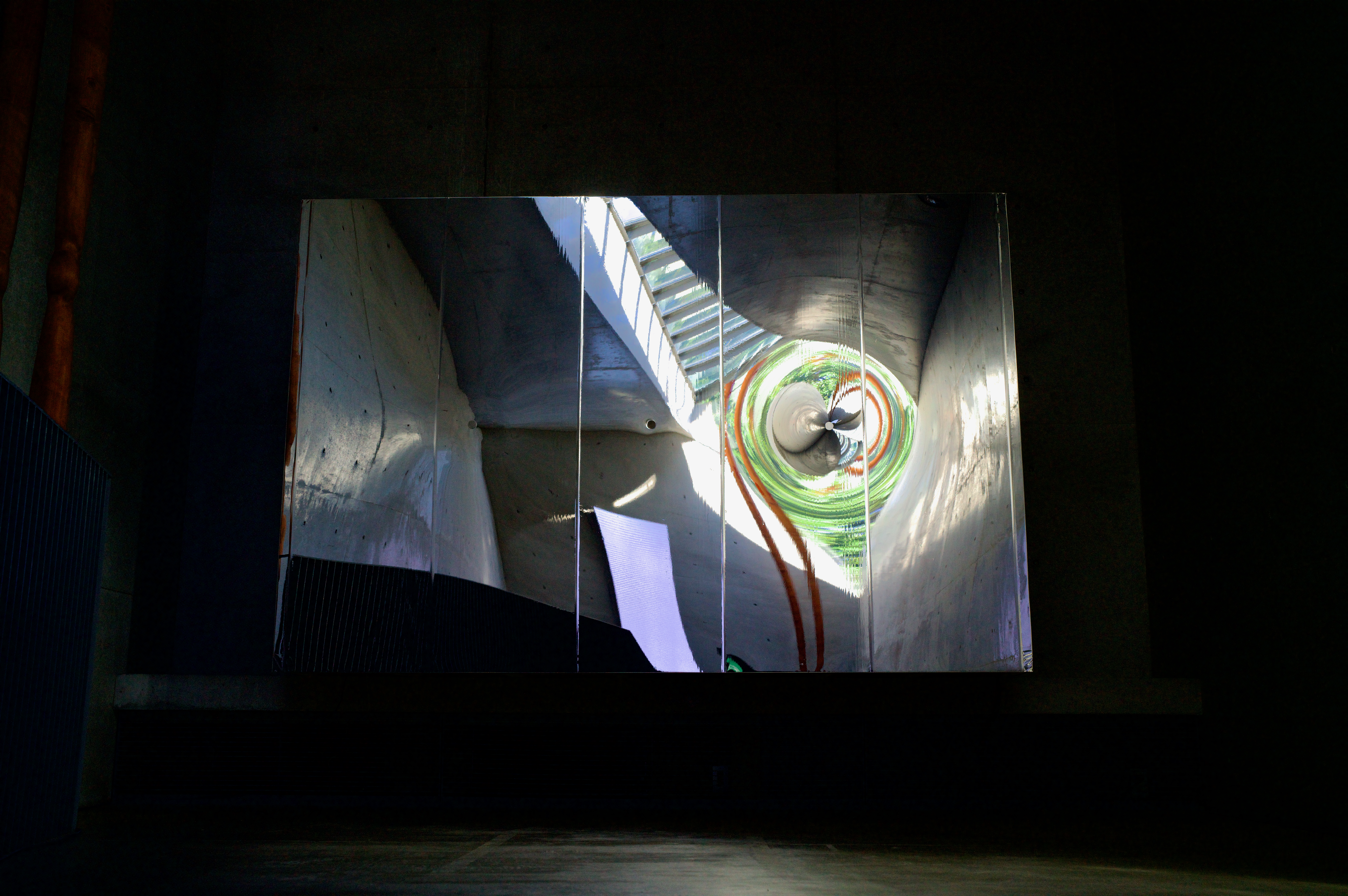
The null^{1.6180025} (2023)

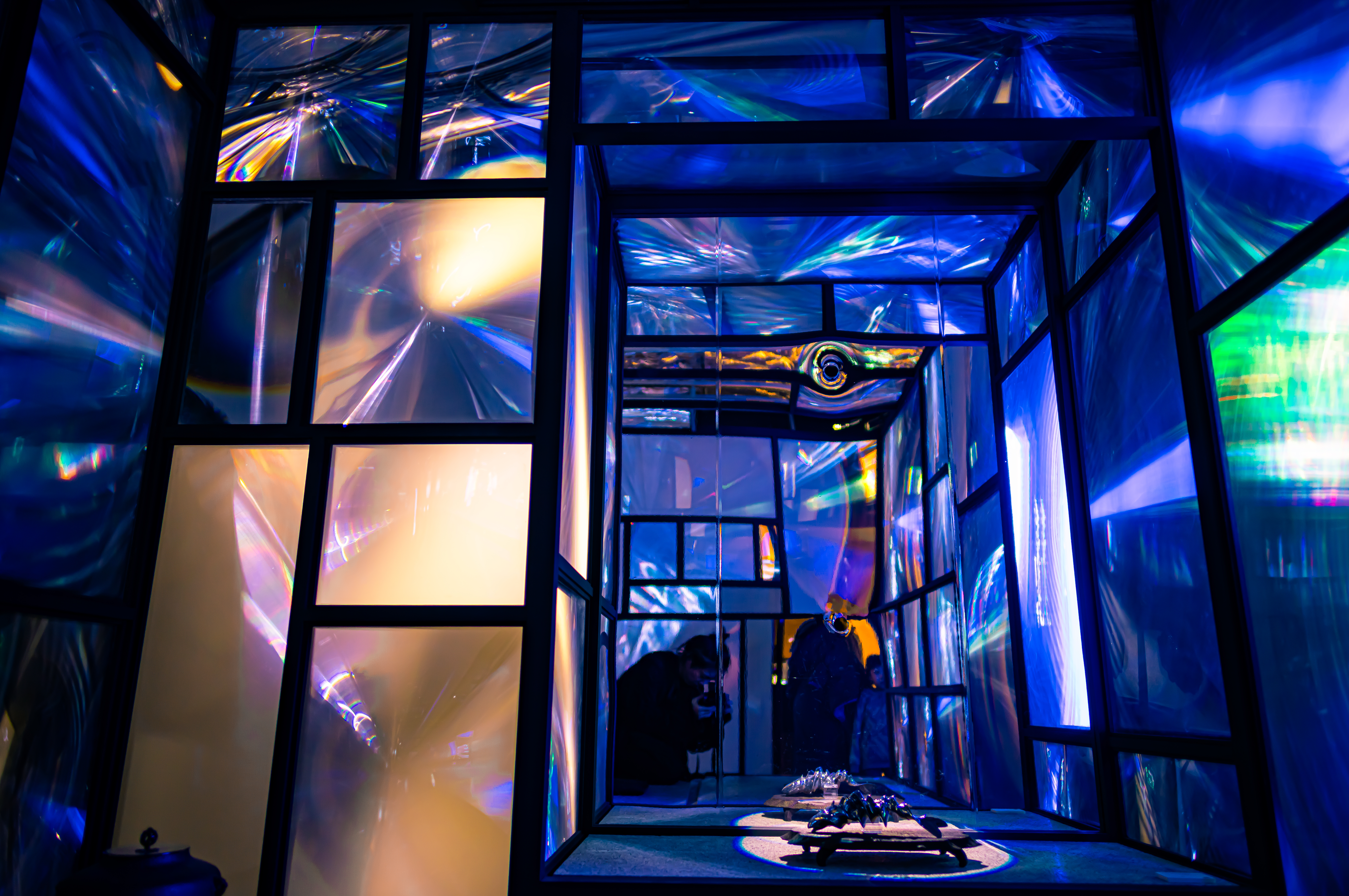
Null-An: Noise as Silence ∽ Silence as Noise (2024)

Mirror Portal of Emergence (2025)

== Concept ==
The thematic project "Polishing Lives" (いのちを磨く) is one of the eight thematic projects of Expo 2025. As its producer, Ochiai was tasked with exploring a form of art that would harmonise nature and artefacts, and the physical and the virtual, to seek a new kind of radiance for future lives.

Ochiai stated shortly after his appointment as thematic project producer in July 2020 that he intended to create a pavilion that would embody his concept of Digital Nature, to build a "moving architecture", and to give the exterior and interior a coherent aesthetic and conceptual continuity.

The main theme of the project is described as the construction and experience of "a synesthetic landscape in which all things melt together, are materialised and transform".

=== Digital Nature ===
Ochiai's concept of "Digital Nature" (計算機自然) envisions a new biosphere in which humans, nature, technology and data are seamlessly connected and traditional boundaries dissolve. Digital Nature is defined not as "nature within digital space", but as "a new nature in which people, objects, nature, computers and data are connected and de-structured". Null² was conceived as a pavilion that would concretely materialise this concept.

=== Social sculpture ===
The German artist Joseph Beuys proposed the idea of "social sculpture", in which conscious social activity itself is regarded as an artwork, and art is seen as having the power to transform society. Elements of this notion are reflected in null². Ochiai has described his activities, including the social implementation of the pavilion, as "a single work of social sculpture", and null² is positioned as a participatory artwork that acts upon society through the experiences of its visitors.

== Mirror motif ==
Since around 2017, Ochiai has produced installation works using floating, rotating mirrors that distort the surrounding landscape, and these experiments formed the basis for the motif of the deforming mirror in null². Both the pavilion's exterior and its interior media environments can be read as extensions and updates of these earlier works.

A key reference for the pavilion's theme is the polished bronze mirror historically used in East Asia; the act of polishing the mirror informed the thematic metaphor of "polishing lives". Ochiai has contrasted Tarō Okamoto's evocation of the Jōmon period in the Tower of the Sun at Expo '70 with his own use of mirrors as a "Yayoi motif" for Expo 2025.

=== Related mirror works ===
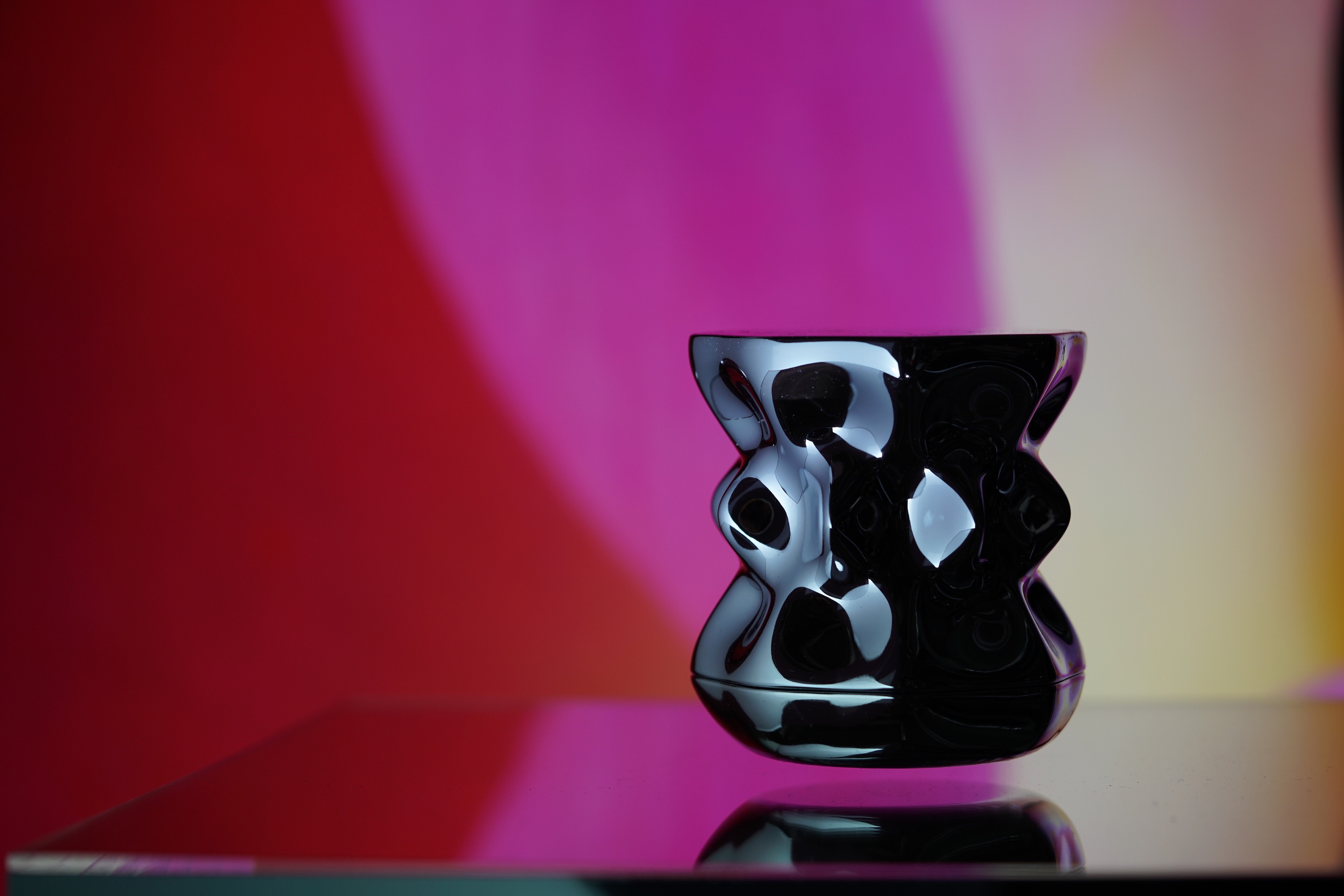
Borrowed Scenery and Materialized Waves (2018)

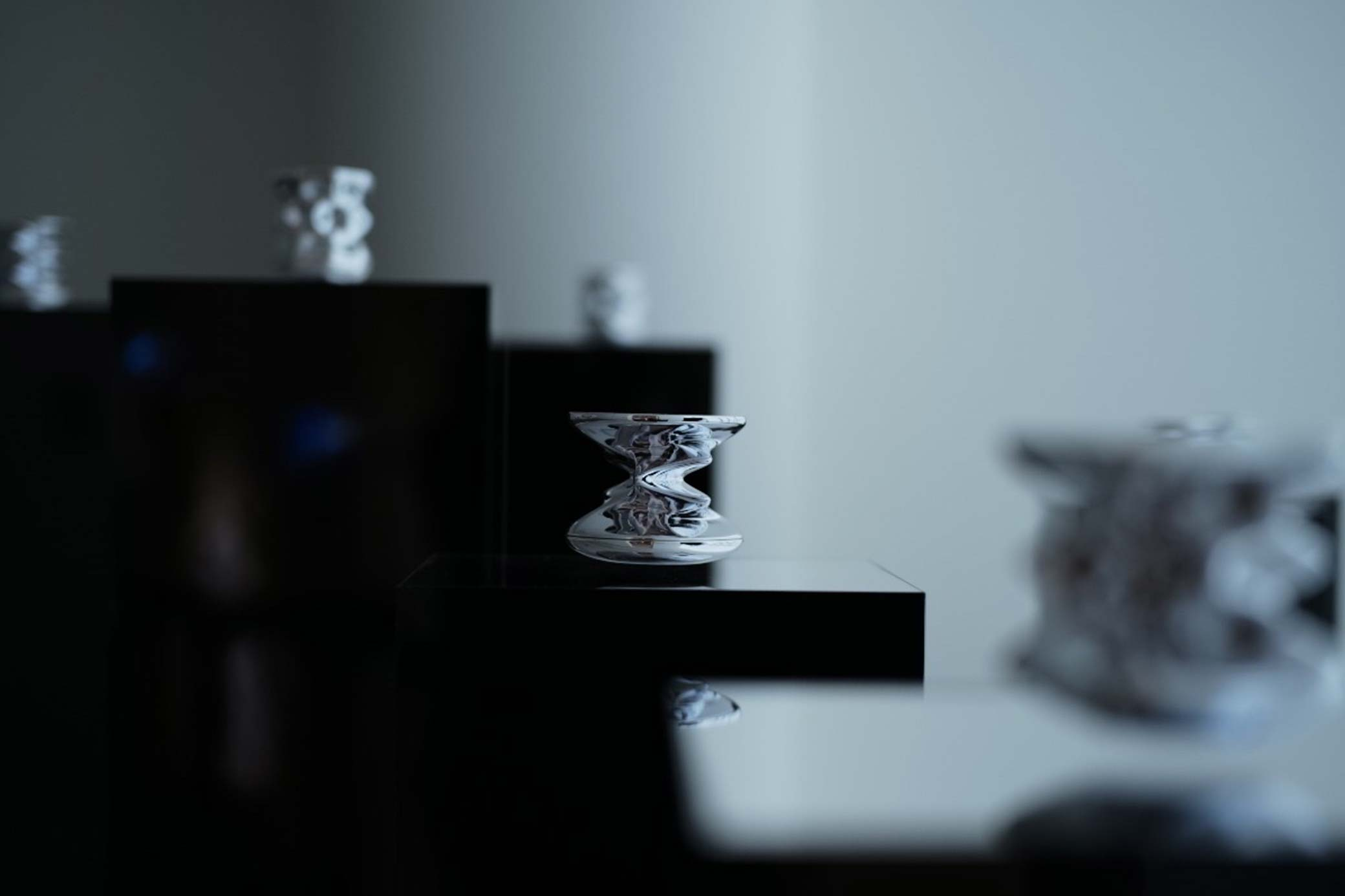
Borrowed Scenery and Materialized Waves (2018)

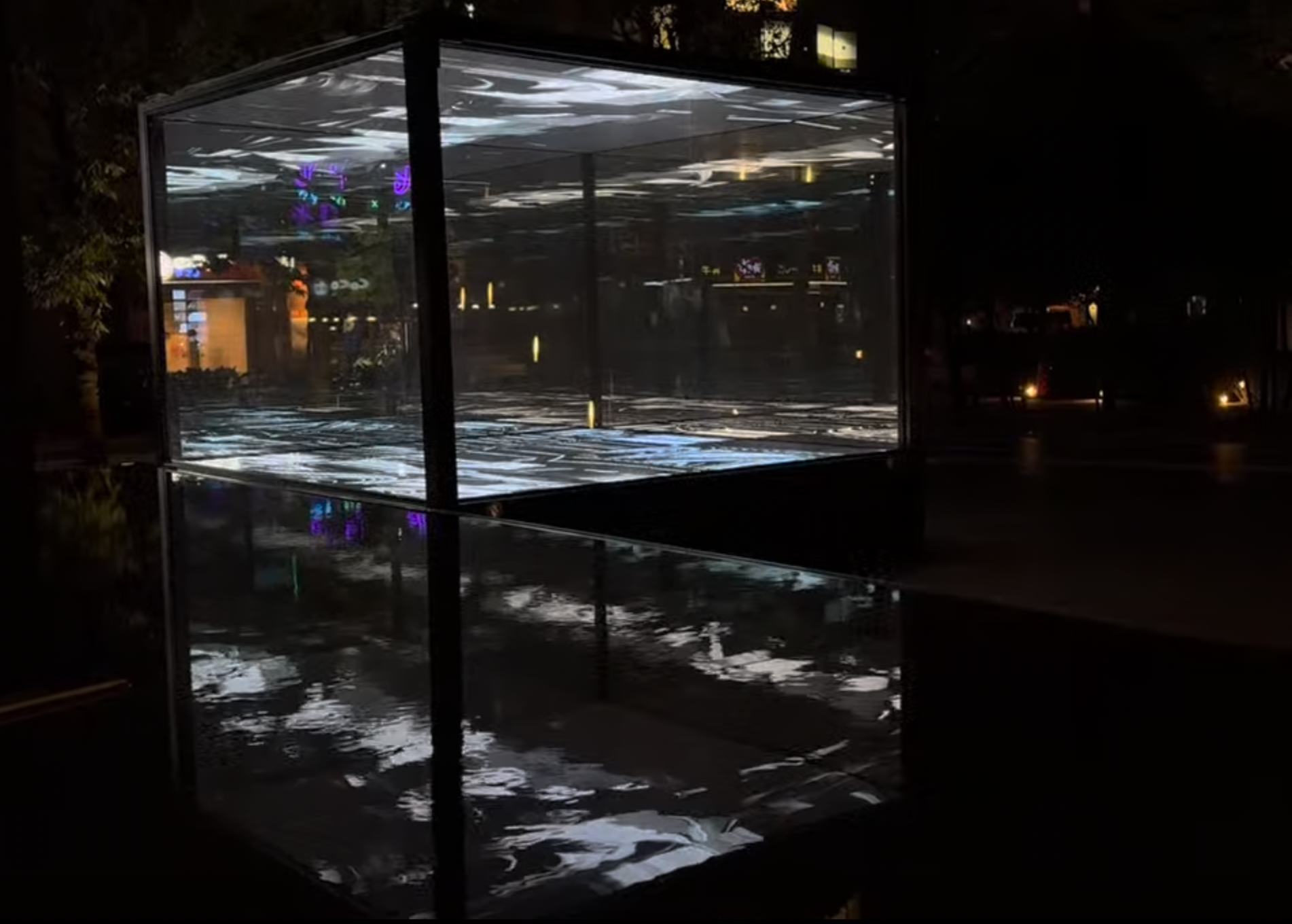
Reflector∞:Resonance of Electrical Echoes (2023)

== Architecture ==
=== Exterior ===
Ochiai's basic plan described null² as "a monument that transforms organic landscapes never before seen, constructed using deformable metamaterial structures and optical metamaterials; a monument-architecture whose appearance transforms together with the surrounding scenery".

The architectural design by NOIZ adopted a composition of 2-metre and 4-metre cubical modules, stacked in a manner reminiscent of Minecraft, using the digital representation of voxels as a key formal motif. The voxel-based composition serves both as a design element linking the digital and the physical and as a flexible system that could adapt to fluctuations in construction costs and material availability without altering the core concept.

At first glance, the pavilion appears to be sheathed in hard, stainless-steel-like mirror panels, but this impression is deliberately undermined by the use of a flexible mirror membrane. The membrane material used for null², which combines stretchability and specular reflectivity, was newly developed by the membrane manufacturer Taiyo Kogyo specifically for the project and was named "mirror membrane" (ミラー膜). Two types of membrane units were created: flat units and "horn-shaped" concave units. By combining these, the facade produces varied optical effects: the horn-shaped surfaces alter reflections depending on the viewing angle, while the flat units shimmer and ripple when actuated, distorting the reflected landscape.

The membrane-clad cubes contain robotic arms controlled by a programmed system. By pushing, striking or pulling on the membrane from behind, the robots create localised deformations, realising the "moving architecture" sought by the design brief. The control system and robotic hardware were developed with industrial-robot manufacturer FANUC.

=== Interior and spatial design ===
The interior of null² is organised around an 8-metre-square "mirror theatre" in which the floor, walls and ceiling are entirely covered with mirror surfaces and LED display systems. Visitors encounter an immersive environment in which their own images and real-time CG imagery are infinitely reflected, producing a sense of spatial disorientation.

The theatre employs a large-scale LED imaging system, combining monumental monolith-type displays with movable ceiling cube screens actuated by robotic arms, so that the architectural space itself appears to move and breathe.

== Exhibition and experience ==
Null² provides interactive experiences through transformable structures and the digitalisation of the body.

Inside the theatre, visitors' bodies are scanned in 3D and transformed into digital avatars, which interact in real time with CG imagery generated using generative AI and other computational techniques. One of the key elements is the "Mirrored Body®", a digital avatar that can engage in dialogue with the visitor based on their data.

These technologies blur the boundaries between self and other, and between reality and virtuality, creating an interactive, synesthetic experience combining sound, light and tactile sensation. The same technical platform has been discussed in the context of potential applications in healthcare and identity verification; Ochiai has suggested that in the future, even if a person is unconscious, emergency responders might still be able to obtain information by interacting with their digital human counterpart.

The pavilion also functions as what Ochiai calls a "sculptural monument". Even without entering the interior, visitors can experience the work by viewing its constantly transforming exterior from the outside.

== Production ==
The sculptural architecture of null² was developed through discussions between Ochiai, who presented the mirror motif and conceptual framework, and the architectural office NOIZ, which was responsible for the architectural design; Arup handled the structural design. The main construction contract was undertaken by a joint venture of Fujita Corporation and Daiwa Lease, and the exhibition interior was delivered by Nomura Co., Ltd.

The exhibition content was planned and produced by the General Incorporated Association Digital Nature and Arts, the video production studio WOW and others, with technical cooperation and sponsorship from FANUC Corporation, Iwasaki Electric and Taiyo Kogyo.

Ochiai has emphasised that a characteristic feature of the project was a team structure in which all participants joined as both engineers and creators, working autonomously within the overall framework.

== Visitors and popularity ==
Null² became one of the most popular pavilions at Expo 2025. According to Ochiai, as of 6 May, some 50,000–60,000 people per day visited the area, but only about 2,000–3,000 could actually enter the pavilion, resulting in an approximate admission ratio of around 30:1.

== Reception ==
The art magazine Bijutsu Techo described null² as "an ambitious pavilion that questions the meaning and changing status of human existence in a society where the digital has become naturally pervasive".

Curator Kou Minamishima of the Yokohama Museum of Art wrote that "the architecture itself is a display that projects images, yet at the same time it cannot but possess a material presence. In that respect, it appears to be the most eccentric architecture among the Signature Pavilions, and can be considered a highly legitimate successor in the history of pavilion architecture."

Illustrator and essayist Hiroshi Miyazawa remarked that null² was "perhaps the pavilion that will remain most strongly in memory at this Expo".

Michiaki Matsushima, editor-in-chief of the Japanese edition of WIRED, called null² "perhaps the most conceptually difficult pavilion at the Expo", adding that precisely for that reason, it "presents a future further ahead than the others".

The pavilion was ranked first in the "Best Pavilion 20" selected by the editors of the design magazine Casa Brutus in its Expo 2025 special issue.

== Awards ==
In 2025, null² received the Silver Award in the Exhibition and Event Space category of the Japan Space Design Awards 2025, organised by the Japan Commercial Environmental Design Association (JCD) and the Japan Design Space Association (DSA).

In the same category, the Signature Pavilion EARTH MART received the Gold Award, while the Japan Pavilion and the pavilion Architecture Becoming Forest (森になる建築) received Bronze Awards.

== Staff ==
The project team is listed on the official pavilion website:

Producer
Yoichi Ochiai
Architectural Exterior Design
Yoichi Ochiai, NOIZ
Architectural Basic Design
NOIZ
Architectural Execution Design
Fujita–Daiwa Lease JV, NOIZ
Architectural Exterior Production
Yoichi Ochiai, raw, Asratec, TASKO
Interior Production
Yoichi Ochiai, WOW, Accel, Asratec, Nomura Co., Ltd.
Interior Design
Yoichi Ochiai, Nomura Co., Ltd.
Interior Engineering and Construction
Nomura Co., Ltd., Fujita–Daiwa Lease JV, NOIZ
Structural Design
Arup
Construction
Fujita–Daiwa Lease Special Joint Venture
Roof Construction
Ozaki Wellsteel
Exterior Membrane
Taiyo Kogyo
Robotics Design
Asratec
Robot Arm Supervision
FANUC
LED Installation
Seibido, Prism
Special Equipment Design and Construction
TASKO
Shop Sales
Sustainable Pavilion 2025
Construction Management
Realworth, Oxat
Mirrored Body® Development
Sustainable Pavilion 2025, Accenture, Industrial Dream, Ikuya Kondo, Hidekazu Furukawa (npaka), Eurus, TAKUMA YAMAZAKI DESIGN, NEC, VESS Labs
Virtual Expo
Jisekai, Tomochika Tanaka, Mazda
Artwork Exhibition, Production, Installation and Tea Room
Jisekai
Operations
Hakuhodo, Hakuhodo Products
Overall Management
Digital Nature and Arts, Jisekai, Oxat, Mazda

== Relocation ==
After the Expo, Ochiai announced that the null² pavilion would be partially relocated and reconstructed at another site. A crowdfunding campaign was launched from 1 October to 19 December to fund the relocation. The initial target of ¥100 million was reached within 23 hours; the goal was subsequently raised to ¥200 million.

Japanese media such as the Asahi Shimbun and ITmedia reported on the relocation plan and the crowdfunding campaign, noting the popularity of the pavilion and the rewards offered, which included physical fragments of the pavilion and "Nurunuru hoodies".

== Documentary film ==
A feature-length documentary about null², titled Farewell, Homosapiens (Japanese: さようなら、ホモサピエンス), was produced under the supervision of Yoichi Ochiai, directed by Kosuke Mori, with Ayako Oki as production head. Running approximately 90 minutes, the film documents the six-year span of the project from initial location scouting on Yumeshima in 2019 through the 184-day operation and closure of the pavilion in October 2025, incorporating interviews with philosophers, roboticists, Buddhist monks and journalists.

The world premiere, titled "null²の49日" (49 Days of null²), was held on 30 November 2025 at the National Museum of Ethnology (Minpaku) in Osaka, attended by approximately 400 crowdfunding supporters. A public screening took place on 13 March 2026 at the Museum of Contemporary Art Tokyo (MOT) as part of the Mission Infinity exhibition.

The film's theme song, "Sayonara Homo Sapiens" (Japanese: さようならホモサピエンス), and its insert song, "Sayonara Null no Mori yo" (Japanese: さようならヌルの森よ), were composed entirely by AI, with lyrics co-written by Ochiai and AI.

=== null⁴ (Tetra-Null) ===
On 19 March 2026, Ochiai announced that the work to be exhibited at the 2027 International Horticultural Exposition (GREEN×EXPO 2027) in Yokohama would not be a simple relocation of null², but a new project entitled "null⁴" (テトラヌル, Tetra-Null). The name derives from (null²)² = null⁴.

null⁴ departs from the angular cuboid forms of null² in favour of an entirely organic shape with no straight edges or pointed corners. It is designed to have no defined front, allowing viewing from any direction, and is conceived as an entity that sounds, glows and vibrates while changing its expression with the seasons. It is planned for installation in the "SATOYAMA Village" area of the expo site. The exhibition period is April–June 2027.

== See also ==
- Expo 2025 pavilions
