= Jun Rekimoto =

Jun Rekimoto (暦本 純一) is a Professor of Interfaculty Initiative in Information Studies at The University of Tokyo. He is also a co-founder of Koozyt Inc., and a Deputy Director of the Interaction Laboratory at Sony Computer Sciences Laboratories.

Rekimoto has published more than 100 research articles in the field of Human-Computer Interaction. His work spans human-computer interactions, augmented reality, virtual reality, human augmentation, telepresence, smart environments and hybrid intelligence.

== Early life ==
In 1971 at the age of 10, before personal computers existed, Rekimoto bought a textbook on computer programming. As a youth, Rekimoto would write out his programs on paper and imagine their results.

Rekimoto received his B.A.Sc., M.Sc. and Ph.D in Information Science from Tokyo Institute of Technology in 1984, 1986 and 1996 respectively.

== Career ==
=== Pre-2000s ===
After earning his master's degree, Rekimoto worked on Unix interfaces as part of the R&D department at NEC Corp. Later, in 1993 Rekimoto went to Canada as a visiting scientist at the University of Alberta. In Canada he experimented with virtual-reality systems, but was disappointed with the unrealistic graphics.

Upon returning to Japan in 1994, Rekimoto started working for the Sony Computer Science Laboratories (CSL). Five years later, in 1999 he founded and directed the CSL's Interaction Laboratory.

=== 2000 to Present ===
In 2007 Rekimoto became a Professor of Interfaculty Initiative in Information Studies at The University of Tokyo. That same year, he co-founded Koozyt, Inc. alongside two other researchers from the CSL.

Since 2011, Rekimoto has been a Deputy Directory at Sony's CSL.

== Notable Research and Inventions ==
Rekimoto was inducted to the ACM SIGCHI Academy in 2007. Rekimoto has published research papers in areas such as mobile wear and computing, virtual reality and information visualization. Rekimoto's work includes:

- SmartSkin: a sensor for the freehand manipulation of interactive surfaces
- Pick-and-drop: a proposal of new user interfaces for directly manipulating multiple computers
- Augmented surfaces: a design for users to interchange information between their devices, including laptops and digital table and wall displays
- Cybercode: a way to digitally tag objects using augmented reality
- Gesturewrist and gesturetouch: two devices to interact with nearby computers via gesture commands
