= List of World's Fair architecture =

This is a list of buildings and structures built for World's Fairs.

== Officially recognized exhibitions ==
Architecture built for world's fairs recognized by the Bureau International des Expositions.

=== London Great Exhibition 1851 ===
- The Crystal Palace

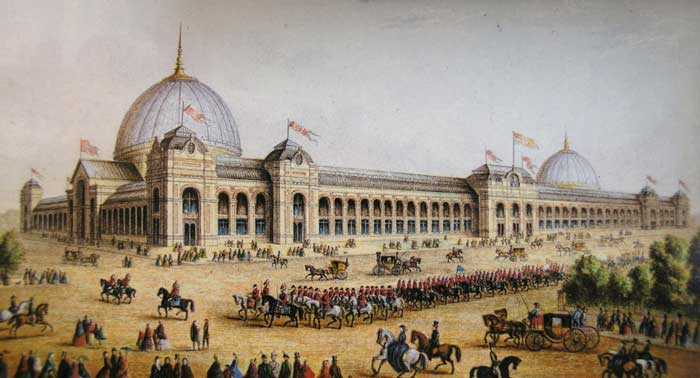
The Exhibition Building of 1862

=== Paris Exposition Universelle 1855 ===
- Palais de l'Industrie
- Théâtre du Rond-Point

=== London International Exhibition 1862 ===
- The Exhibition Building of 1862

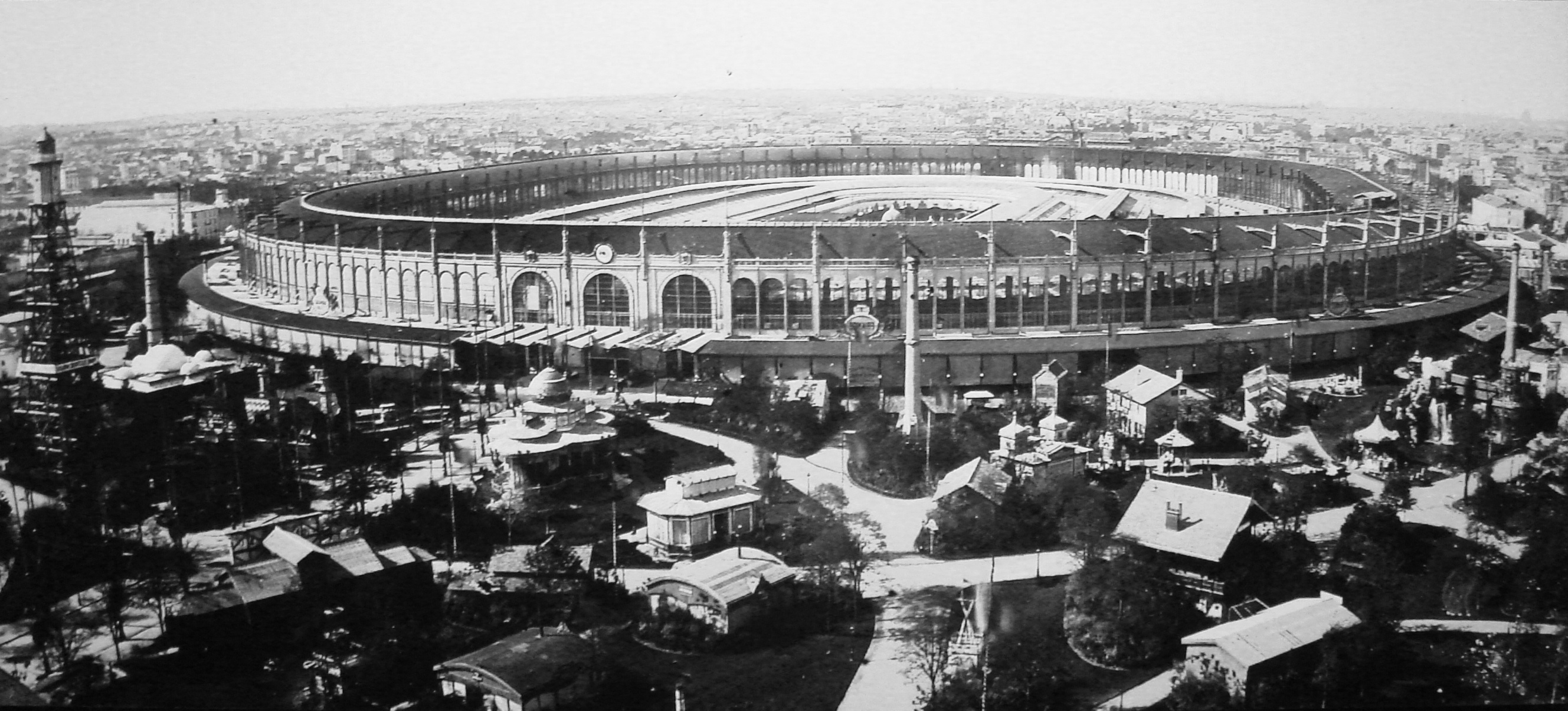
Palais du Champ de Mars

=== Paris Exposition Universelle 1867 ===
- Palais du Champ de Mars

=== Vienna World's Fair 1873 ===
- Rotunda

=== Philadelphia Centennial Exposition 1876 ===
- Main Exhibition Building

=== Paris Exposition Universelle 1878 ===
- Palais du Trocadéro

=== Melbourne International Exhibition 1880 ===
- Royal Exhibition Building

=== Barcelona Universal Exposition 1888 ===
- Parc de la Ciutadella

=== Paris Exposition Universelle 1889 ===
- Eiffel Tower
- Galerie des machines

=== Chicago World's Columbian Exposition 1893 ===
- White City

=== Brussels International Exposition 1897 ===
- Palace of the Colonies

=== Paris Exposition Universelle 1900 ===
- Grand Palais
- Petit Palais

=== Liège International 1905 ===
- Palais des beaux-arts de Liège

=== San Francisco Panama–Pacific International Exposition 1915 ===
- Tower of Jewels
- Palace of Fine Arts

=== Barcelona International Exposition 1929 ===
- Palau Nacional
- Barcelona Pavilion
- Estadi Olímpic Lluís Companys
- Poble Espanyol
- Teatre Grec
- Magic Fountain of Montjuïc

=== Paris Exposition Internationale des Arts et Techniques dans la Vie Moderne 1937 ===
- Palais de Chaillot

=== New York World's Fair 1939 ===
- 1939 New York World's Fair pavilions and attractions
  - Trylon and Perisphere

=== Brussels Expo 58 ===
- Atomium
- Philips Pavilion

=== Seattle Century 21 Exposition 1962 ===
- Seattle Center
- Seattle Center Monorail
- Space Needle

=== Montreal Expo 67 ===
- Expo 67 pavilions
- Habitat 67

=== San Antonio HemisFair '68 ===
- Tower of the Americas

=== Expo 2010 ===
- Expo 2010 pavilions
  - China pavilion at Expo 2010
  - Expo Axis
  - Singapore pavilion at Expo 2010
  - Sweden pavilion at Expo 2010
  - UK pavilion at Expo 2010
  - USA pavilion at Expo 2010

=== Expo 2020 ===
- Expo 2020 pavilions

=== Expo 2025 ===
- Expo 2025 pavilions
  - Grand Ring
  - Null²
  - Tech World pavilion

== Others ==
=== Porto International Exhibition 1867 ===
- Palácio de Cristal

=== Sydney International Exhibition 1879 ===
- Garden Palace

=== Adelaide Jubilee International Exhibition 1887 ===
- Jubilee Exhibition Building

=== Hanoi Exhibition 1902 ===
- Grand Palais

=== Colonial Exhibition of Semarang 1914 ===
- Aceh Museum

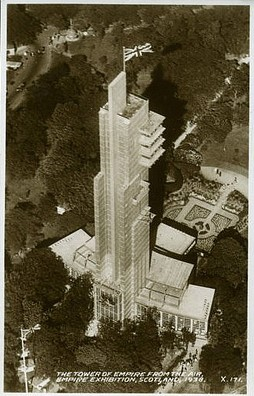
Tait Tower

=== Paris Colonial Exposition 1931 ===
- Palais de la Porte Dorée
- Pagode de Vincennes

=== Glasgow Empire Exhibition 1938 ===
- Tait Tower

=== New York World's Fair 1964 ===
- 1964 New York World's Fair pavilions
  - New York City Pavilion
  - New York Hall of Science
  - New York State Pavilion
  - Terrace on the Park
  - Wisconsin Pavilion
- Unisphere
