= Expo 2025 pavilions =

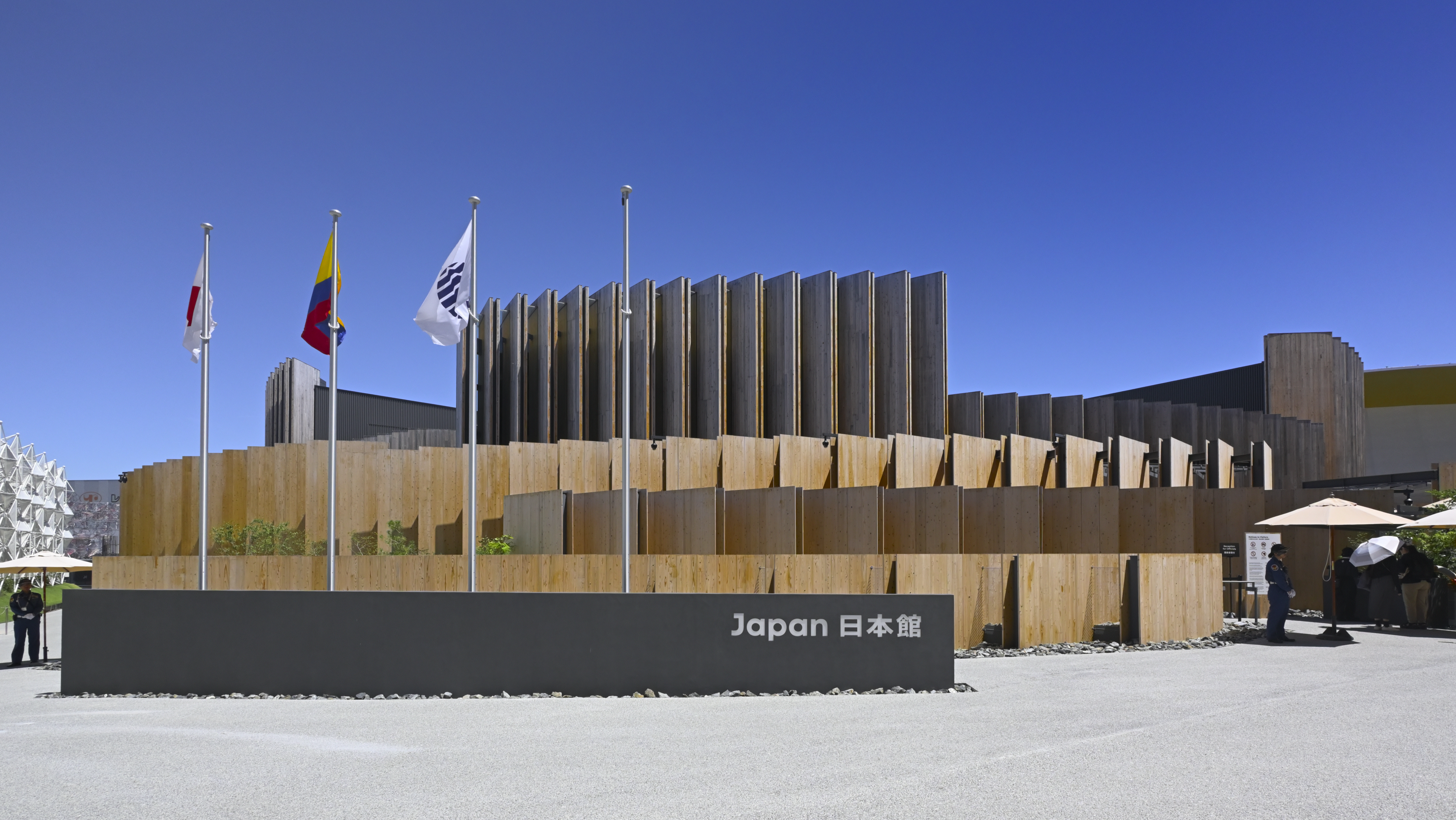
Japan Pavilion by Nikken Sekkei with Oki Sato

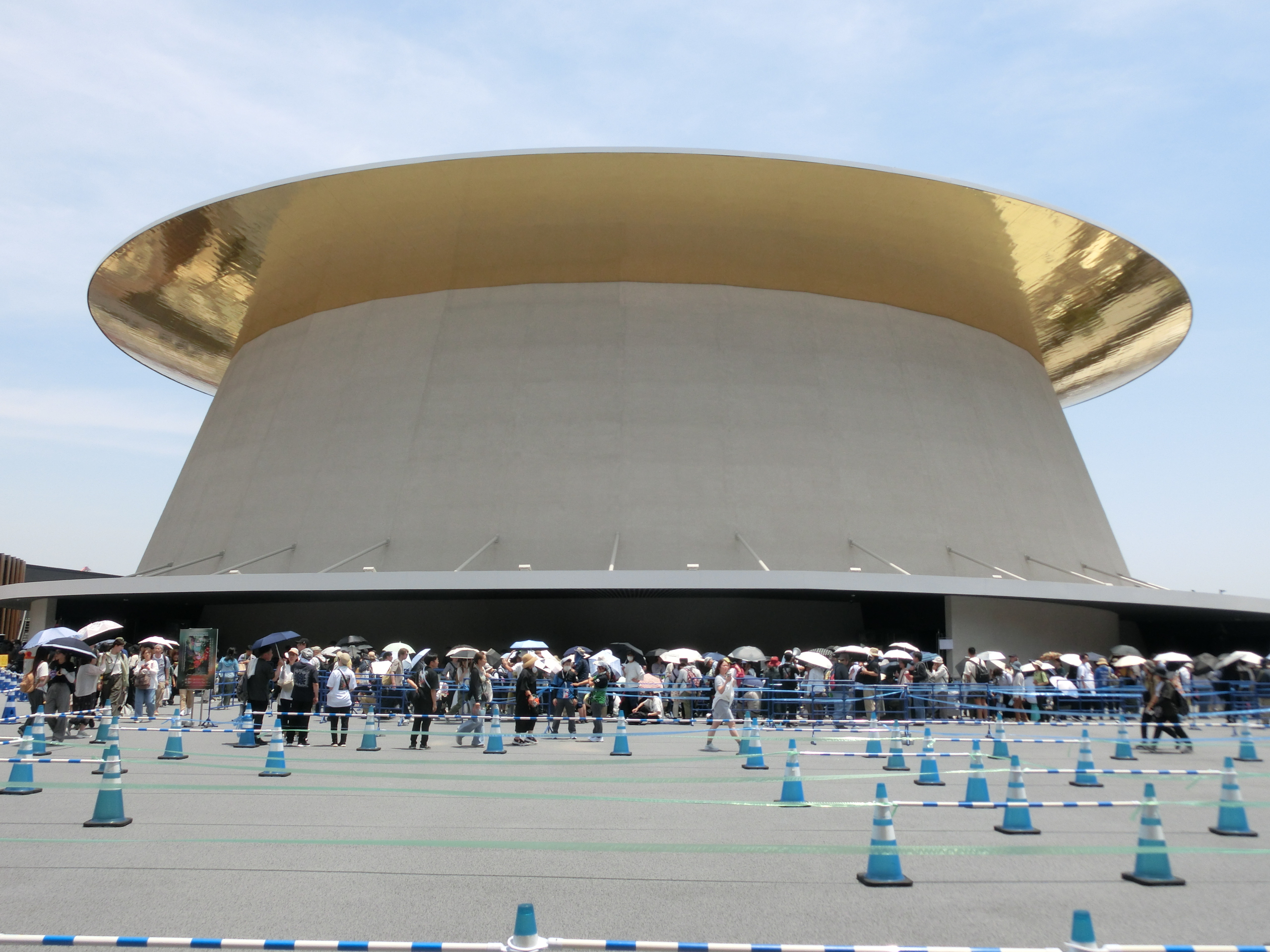
Shinning Hat Expo Hall amphitheatre by Toyo Ito and Associates

Expo 2025 (Japanese: 2025年日本国際博覧会, Hepburn: Nisennijūgo-nen Nihon Kokusai Hakuran-kai) was a World Expo that was hosted in Osaka, Japan, from 13 April 2025 to 13 October 2025. There were a total of 188 Expo pavilions, out of which 152 represented participating countries, 13 were hosted by private sector participants, 8 were "Signature" pavilions, and 15 were hosted by various organizations and the Japanese government. In addition to Sou Fujimoto's Grand Ring, additional structures including the pavilions were designed by well known Japanese and international architects and designers such as Shigeru Ban, Atelier Brückner, Foster + Partners, Lina Ghotmeh, Manuel Herz, Kengo Kuma, Michele de Lucchi, Yuko Nagayama, Nendo, Yoichi Ochiai, Carlo Ratti, RAU Architects, and SANAA.

== Overview ==
=== Participation ===
There were four types of pavilion in the expo: A, X, B, and C. In the type A, the participating countries planned and built the pavilion entirely on their own. For the type X, the expo association built the pavilion instead. For types B and C, the expo association built buildings which countries could use to set up booths or book rooms.

Some countries withdrew their participation, such as Greece, Mexico, Estonia, Argentina, Niue, Russia, Afghanistan, and Niger. These withdrawals were caused by factors such as financial issues, political instability, and negative relations with Japan, especially with Russia after the Russian invasion of Ukraine. Countries like Iran have withdrawn from the expo after the structures of the building was complete. By the start of the expo, around 158 nations and regions participated in the expo. Out of 158 participating nations and regions, 47 used type A, 5 used type X. The number of pavilions entirely built by participating countries decreased by 11 from the previous Expo 2020.

=== Entrance systems ===
As the expo introduced digital tickets and reservations under the motto "The expo without waiting lines", some pavilions required reservations to visit. Some pavilions, such as type C pavilions, several type A pavilions such as the Nordic pavilion, and some of the domestic pavilions did not introduce this reservation system. Due to people not making it to the pavilions they reserved on time, the gates began to open five to ten minutes early from 25 May.

=== Delays in construction and opening, and unpaid construction ===
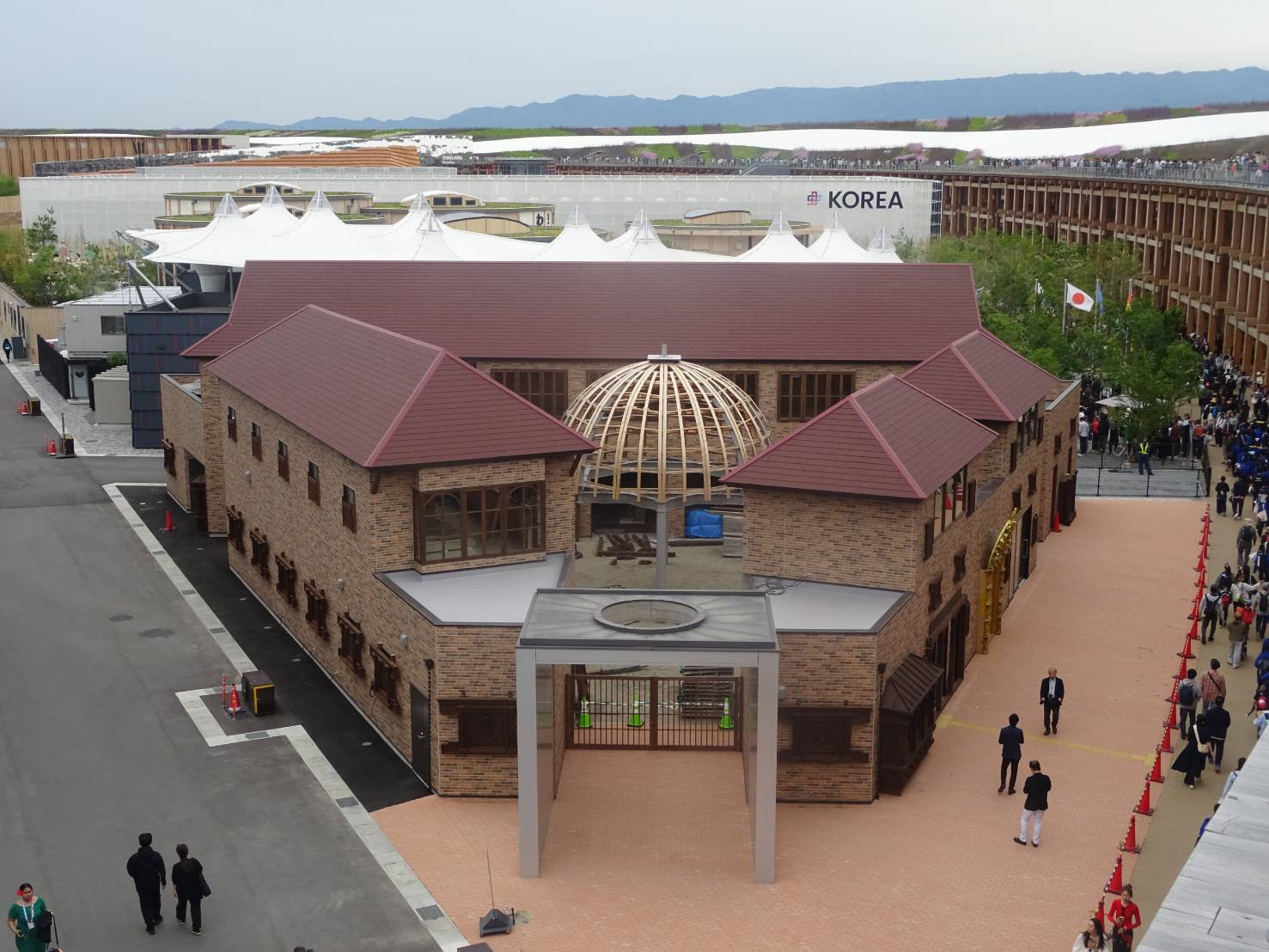
View of the Nepali pavilion showing incomplete interior construction (17 May 2025)

Concerns of difficulty in the construction were already raised around June 2023. Yumeshima, the site of the expo lacked electricity and water for most duration of the construction works. Although the constructions of international pavilions were scheduled to finish by the middle of October 2024, construction of many pavilions were delayed. Malta's pavilion did not began construction until December 2024. Only three pavilions finished construction by 27 December. By March 2025, five additional pavilions finished construction. By 11 April, two days before the start of expo, 39 out of 42 pavilions using type A were completed, while the pavilions of Spain, Nepal and Romania were not ready to open at the time. By the opening date of Expo 2025, the pavilions of Nepal, India, Vietnam, Brunei and Chile were not ready to open, while the pavilions of Poland, Kuwait and Turkmenistan were closed for public viewing on 13 April. The pavilions of Brazil, which opening was delayed due to fire, and Chile opened on 16 April. Some pavilions have opened before it was ready. Angola's pavilion was temporarily opened for the first day of the expo, but the pavilion has been closed since that day. Vietnam's pavilion opened on 30 April, and India and Brunei's pavilion opened on 1 May.

On 22 April, it was found that the construction of Nepal's pavilion was halted due to lack of payments for the pavilion cost. Although Nepal authorities paid the costs for the start of the construction, they did not make any payments after that, forcing the construction to halt around January 2025. The Expo Association disclosed on 20 May, that there had been three reports of unpaid construction by April. It was also noticed that, the construction companies who constructed the Angola pavilion did not have construction permits, and had no prior experience in construction. Construction resumed on 16 June, and the pavilion opened to the public on 19 July, as the last pavilion to open in the expo.

Eleven incidents of unpaid construction were reported by August, and some affected companies claimed that they were on the verge of bankruptcy. This has caused lawsuits against agencies, and the problem has persisted after the end of the expo.

=== Criticisms of exhibitions ===
Some exhibitions and other features of a few pavilions received criticism for the lack of content, or inaccuracies. The exhibitions inside the pavilion for Thailand received criticisms among their citizens on social media, as they shared their disappointment with the quality of the exhibition itself, and the lack of Ya mong in its souvenir stores, despite them being popular among foreign tourists. The British pavilion was met with negative feedback due to it serving afternoon tea with paper cups and stands sold at IKEA, with rumors of the cake being the generic cut cakes sold for business uses. The British embassy in Japan quickly apologized for the incident and improved service at the pavilion, ending the criticisms against the afternoon tea product, with the quick response praised online.

=== Repurposing of pavilions post-expo ===
Several pavilions have been confirmed to be planned for repurposing, or have their material re-used for other structures. The woman's pavilion will have their material re-used in the green expo that will be held in Yokohama in 2027. The Gas pavilion used parts generally used for large-scale constructions, that will be given back to the owning company after the expo. The Netherlands pavilion will be moved to the Awaji Island post-expo.

== Type A or X pavilions ==
As of July 2024, forty-seven countries had decided to build their own pavilions. Italy was the first nation to begin constructing its respective pavilion and was the only participant that began constructing its building in 2023.

Name	Image	Zone	Description/Notes
Angola		Saving Lives	
Australia		Connecting Lives	A structure inspired by a eucalyptus gum nut, designed by Buchan.
Austria		Empowering Lives	A spiral musical staff-inspired structure designed by BWM Architects. This pavilion contains three exhibition areas and is made mostly of wood.
Azerbaijan		Connecting Lives	A structure designed by ELEVEN and Bellprat Partner. Seven arches are connected to the main building of the pavilion, each of the arches representing a cultural aspect; this is a reference to the pavilion's theme, "Seven Bridges to Sustainability". The main building's exterior is designed to resemble interwoven threads.
Bahrain		Empowering Lives	Designed by Lina Ghotmeh, the pavilion is inspired by freshwater springs and the sea around Bahrain.
Baltic Pavilion: Latvia; Lithuania		Saving Lives	
Belgium		Saving Lives	A three-story pavilion designed by Carré 7 and themed to the three stages of water. The roof includes a restaurant. This design won a Bronze Award for thematic interpretation for Type A pavilions.
Bulgaria		Saving Lives	
Canada		Empowering Lives	Designed by Rayside Labossière and Guillaume Pelletier, the pavilion is inspired by a frozen river melting during the beginning of spring. This design won a Bronze Award for exhibition design for Type A pavilions.
China		Empowering Lives	A structure designed by China Architecture Design Group. The exterior is based on bamboo slips, displaying Confucius's Analects and Chinese poetry; the interior has circular monitors that display Chinese landscapes. This is one of Expo 2025's largest Type A pavilions, spanning 3,500 square feet (330 m^{2}). This design won a Gold Award for exhibition design for Type A pavilions.
Colombia		Empowering Lives	An ice cube-shaped structure designed by MORF Inc. in reference to Gabriel García Márquez's novel One Hundred Years of Solitude (which features an "ice house"). The building has a facade of backlit, translucent polycarbonate panels and an internal steel frame, with interior decorations resembling the Colombian landscape.
Czech Republic		Empowering Lives	A spiraling structure designed by Apropos Architects, made of timber with a glass facade; the interior has a mural measuring 250 metres (820 ft) wide.
France		Empowering Lives	A cubic structure designed by Coldefy & Associés and Carlo Ratti Associati, with a winding ramp leading to a roof garden.
Germany		Connecting Lives	A set of seven round wooden structures designed by Laboratory for Visionary Architecture. Officially named "WA! Doitsu", in reference to the Japanese words for "circle", "harmony", and "wow". This design won a Silver Award for thematic interpretation for Type A pavilions.
Holy See (part of Italian Pavilion)		Saving Lives	
Hungary		Saving Lives	A structure designed by Gábor Zoboki, with a timber-and-paper exterior and wooden dome, modeled after a rural Hungarian landscape. The three-story structure is made of steel and semi-reinforced concrete.
India		Connecting Lives	A structure with an exterior resembling a lotus flower and 70,000 LEDs on the roof. The entrance contains a Buddhist icon, a chakra monument, and a motif depicting hands in prayer.
Indonesia		Connecting Lives	A ship-shaped building that uses environmentally friendly materials such as wood. Inside is a recreation of a waterfall. This design won a Silver Award for exhibition design for Type A pavilions.
Ireland		Empowering Lives	A two-story structure designed by CT Brand and TSP Taiyo, made of three cylindrical structures. The exterior is made of Irish wood, while the interior is laid out like a triskele with three distinct zones.
Italy		Saving Lives	Designed by Mario Cucinella with a facade resembling a portico, in addition to an interior with Renaissance-inspired color scheme. Consists of three sections: the Theatre, the Ideal City, and the Italian Garden. This design won a Gold Award for thematic interpretation for Type A pavilions.
Japan		East Gate	A ring-shaped structure designed by Oki Sato and Nikken Sekkei and made of cross-laminated timber. The pavilion is separated into three different areas, factory, plant, and farm. The timbers making up the pavilion is planned to be reused in buildings all over Japan after the end of the expo.
Kuwait		Empowering Lives	Designed by Laboratory for Visionary Architecture with a roof inspired by outstretched wings.
Luxembourg		Connecting Lives	Designed by STEINMETZDEMEYER and Jangled Nerves, the pavilion is a set of 13 steel-framed boxy structures (each representing a different Luxembourgish town) covered by a shared membrane roof.
Malaysia		Empowering Lives	A structure designed by Current Media Group and Kengo Kuma to resemble a bamboo forest. The three-story building has a steel frame and uses 5,000 bamboo stalks on the facade and 500 more bamboo stalks inside.
Malta		Empowering Lives	
Monaco		Connecting Lives	
Netherlands		Saving Lives	Designed by RAU Architects to resemble a "rising sun", with a facade resembling rippling water.
(Nordic Council) Nordic Circle: Denmark; Finland; Iceland; Norway; Sweden		Empowering Lives	This pavilion, a 17-metre (56 ft) tall structure designed by Michele De Lucchi to represent a Nordic barn, is a modular building shared by five Nordic countries. In addition to the exhibition areas, there are a business center and a rooftop garden and restaurant.
Oman		Saving Lives	
Philippines		Empowering Lives	
Poland		Saving Lives	
Portugal		Empowering Lives	A structure designed by Kengo Kuma with a floating facade that incorporates recycled materials from the maritime industry, such as ropes and fishing nets.
Qatar		Empowering Lives	A structure designed by Kengo Kuma with a white fabric facade and timber frame, a reference to Qatari dhows and Japanese wooden joinery.
Romania		Saving Lives	
Saudi Arabia		Connecting Lives	An angular building designed by Foster + Partners inspired by the architecture of Saudi villages, along with a planted forecourt. This design won a Gold Award for architecture and landscape design for Type A pavilions.
Serbia		Connecting Lives	A structure designed by Aleatek Studio.
Singapore		Saving Lives	A windowless spherical structure designed by DP Architects and known as the "Dream Sphere". It has a 17-metre-tall (56 ft) facade composed of over 17,000 discs.
South Korea		Connecting Lives	Designed by UIA Design Office and Nikkei Design, the pavilion is a three-story reinforced concrete structure. This pavilion has a large display on its facade measuring 27 metres (89 ft) wide.
Spain		Connecting Lives	Designed by Néstor Montenegro, Enorme Studio, and Smart and Green Design. The structure of the pavilion references the Kuroshio Current. This design won a Silver Award for architecture and landscape design for Type A pavilions.
Switzerland		Empowering Lives	A set of spherical structures designed by Manuel Herz, with plastic cladding, a modular steel frame, and plants surrounding it.
Thailand		Connecting Lives	
Turkey		Connecting Lives	
Turkmenistan		Empowering Lives	
United Arab Emirates		Empowering Lives	This pavilion included 90 columns measuring 16 meters (52 ft) tall, which are made of rachises from two million date palm trees. This design won a Bronze Award for architecture and landscape design for Type A pavilions.
United Kingdom		Saving Lives	A structure designed by Woo Architects with a perforated aluminium-panel facade resembling punched cards.
United States		Empowering Lives	A structure designed by Trahan Architects with two triangular wings and a raised translucent cube flanking a central plaza.
Uzbekistan		Connecting Lives	A modular wooden structure designed by Atelier Brückner. The two-story triangular structure, inspired by the architecture of Khiva, measures 8 metres (26 ft) tall, with a brick-and-clay foundation and 300 pieces of wood. There is also a "garden of knowledge".

== Type C pavilions ==
These pavilions were located inside one of the Commons buildings, with each commons building assigned the letters A to F. However, due to changes in participating countries and regions, the commons E building was formerly unused with no clear plans to use them. From May onward, the commons E building was used for a manga event.

=== Commons A ===
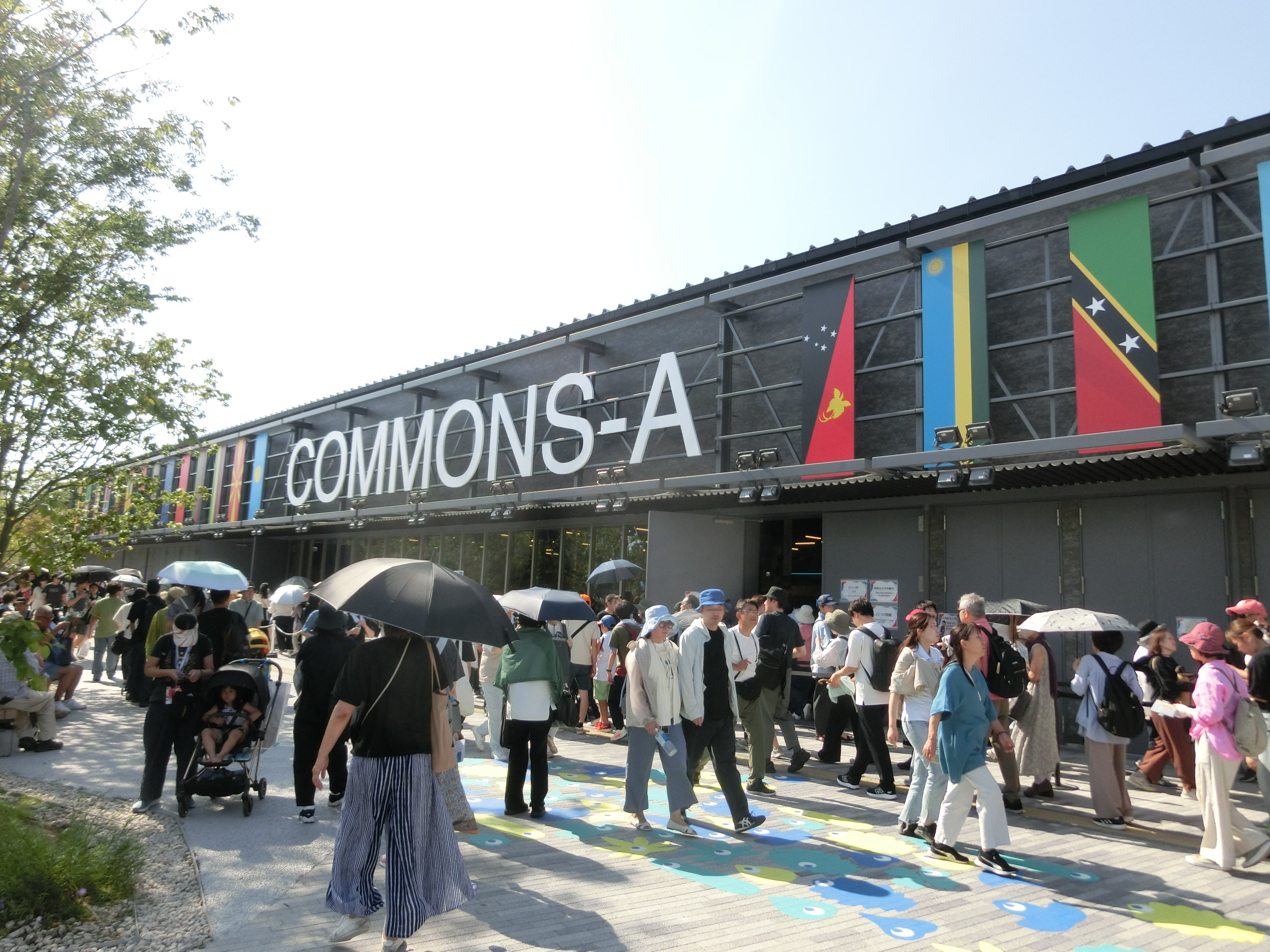
Commons A building

The commons A building housed pavilions for the following 29 nations.

- Barbados
- Bolivia
- Burundi
- Comoros
- Eswatini
- Ghana
- Grenada
- Guinea-Bissau
- Kenya
- Kosovo
- Kyrgyzstan
- Malawi
- Mauritius
- North Macedonia
- Palau
- Papua New Guinea
- Rwanda
- Samoa
- Seychelles
- Suriname
- Solomon Islands
- Sri Lanka
- Saint Kitts and Nevis
- Saint Lucia
- Trinidad and Tobago
- Tonga
- Uganda
- Vanuatu
- Yemen

=== Commons B ===
The commons B building housed pavilions for the following 26 nations.

- Cape Verde
- Ethiopia
- Guyana
- Gambia
- Ivory Coast
- Zambia
- Sierra Leone
- Djibouti
- Jamaica
- Zimbabwe
- Saint Vincent and the Grenadines
- Somalia
- Tanzania
- Chad
- Central African Republic
- Tuvalu
- Dominican Republic
- Nauru
- Haiti
- Paraguay
- Timor-Leste
- Fiji
- Benin
- Federated States of Micronesia
- Mauritania
- Lesotho

=== Commons C ===
The commons C building housed pavilions for the following 11 nations.

- Israel
- Ukraine
- Uruguay
- Gabon
- Guatemala
- Croatia
- San Marino
- Slovakia
- Slovenia
- Panama
- Montenegro

=== Commons D ===
The commons D building housed pavilions for the following 25 nations.

- Antigua and Barbuda
- Cameroon
- Guinea
- Cuba
- DR Congo
- São Tomé and Príncipe
- Sudan
- Equatorial Guinea
- Tajikistan
- Togo
- Nigeria
- Pakistan
- Palestine
- Bhutan
- Burkina Faso
- Honduras
- Belize
- Marshall Islands
- Madagascar
- Mali
- South Sudan
- Moldova
- Mongolia
- Laos
- Liberia

=== Commons F ===
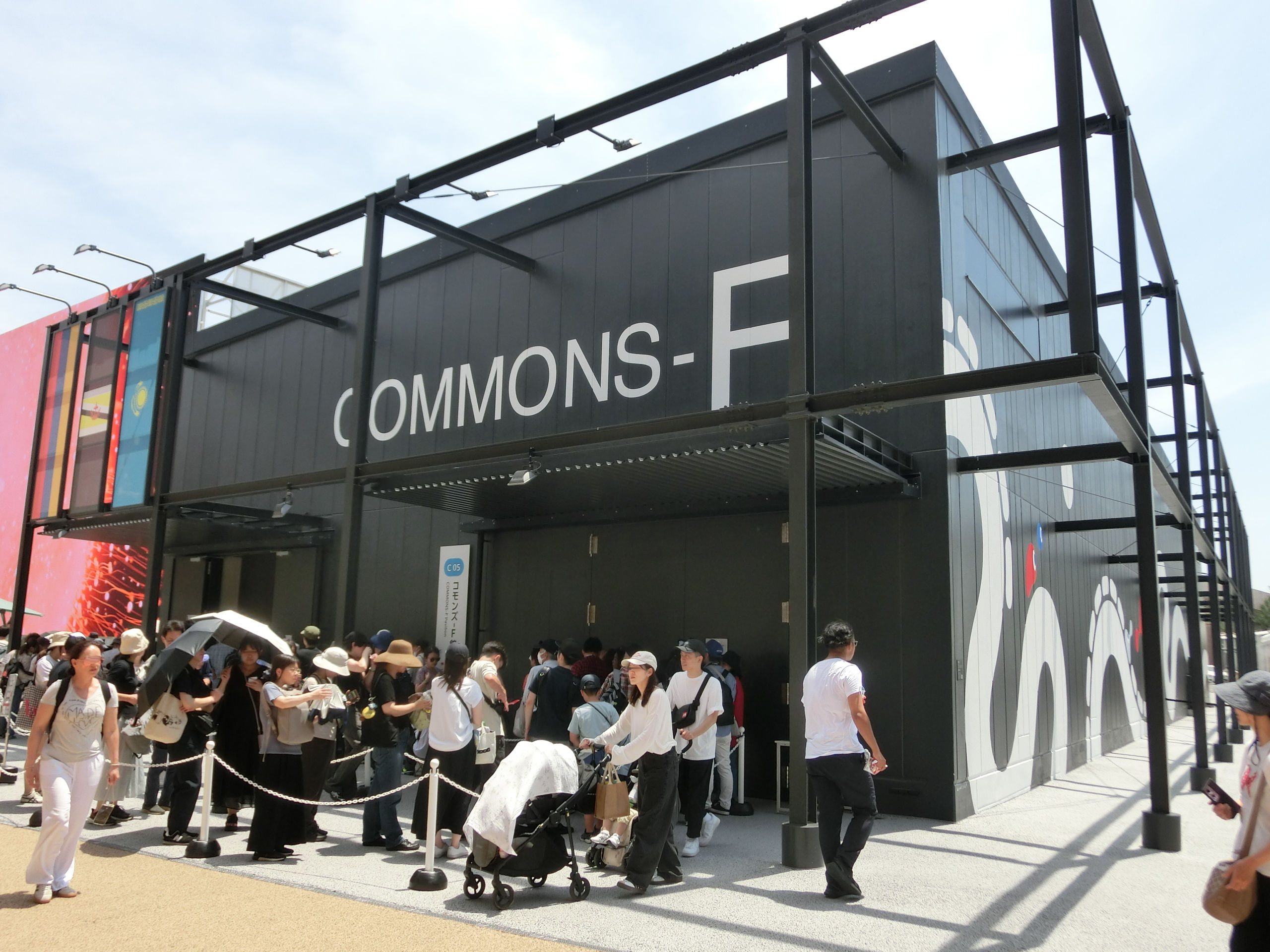
Commons F building

The commons F building housed pavilions for the following 3 nations:

- Armenia
- Brunei
- Kazakhstan

== International organizations' pavilions ==
With the exception of the EU pavilion, all pavilions hosted by international groups were located inside a single large building in the "Empowering Lives" zone.

Name	Image	Zone	Description/Notes
European Union		Saving Lives	
International Red Cross and Red Crescent Movement		Empowering Lives	
ASEAN		Empowering Lives	
International Science and Technology Center		Empowering Lives	
International Solar Alliance		Empowering Lives	
International Thermonuclear Experimental Reactor		Empowering Lives	
United Nations		Empowering Lives	Represents over 30 U.N. organizations.

== Themed "signature" pavilions ==
"Signature" pavilions were located at the center of the Grand Ring surrounding the expo. The construction and planning of the pavilions was led by eight producers.

Name	Image	Code	Descriptions/Notes
Better Co-Being		X01	Developed by Hiroaki Miyata. Pavilion lacks any roof or walls, and is instead covered by a canopy. Pavilion designed by SANAA.
Future of Life		X02	Developed by Hiroshi Ishiguro. Pavilion structure based on water and shore. The facade consists of a membrane that is designed to resemble the shimmering water.
Playground of Life: Jellyfish Pavilion		X03	Developed by Sachiko Nakajima. The pavilion's theme is "Invigorating Lives!", and the structure has three layers, one of which is located underground. Most of the exhibitions inside the pavilion are based on jellyfish.
null²		X04	Developed by Yoichi Ochiai. The pavilion's theme is "Forging Lives". The structure is based on a cubic grid of voxels measuring 2 to 8 metres (6 ft 7 in to 26 ft 3 in) wide. The facade is covered with a membrane that resembles a mirror.
Dynamic Equilibrium of Life		X05	Developed by Shinichi Fukuoka. The pavilion's theme is "Quest of Life", and the structure is based on, and named after Embryo.
Live Earth Journey		X06	Developed by Shōji Kawamori. The pavilion is made of cubic structures named "cells".
Earth Mart		X07	Developed by Kundō Koyama. The pavilion itself is intended to resemble a supermarket, and the roof of the pavilion is made of Imperata cylindrica's roots, which is planned to be upcycled after the expo.
Dialogue Theater		X08	Developed by Naomi Kawase. The pavilion is based on wooden buildings of two separate closed schools in Nara Prefecture and Kyoto Prefecture.

== Private sector pavilions ==
Name	Image	Zone	Descriptions/Notes
Electric Power Pavilion		East Gate	A structure sponsored by the Federation of Electric Power Companies, with interactive energy-related exhibits.
Gas Pavilion Obake Wonderland		West Gate	Sponsored by the Japan Gas Association, it is located on the northern side of the fairground's central ring and contains various games and interactive displays.
Gundam Next Future Pavilion		West Gate	A structure based on the Mobile Suit Gundam franchise, with an immersive exhibit inside, including a floor with haptic technology and a screen measuring 18 by 8 metres (59 by 26 ft). There is a 16.7-metre-tall (55 ft), 49.1-tonne (48.3-long-ton; 54.1-short-ton) Gundam statue outside the pavilion.
Iida Group and Osaka Metropolitan University Joint Pavilion		West Gate	A shared exhibition space with a large Nishijin-ori textile facade and a diorama of a futuristic city and a smart house inside it.
Mitsubishi Pavilion		East Gate	A structure designed by Mitsubishi Jisho Design Studio, with a facade made of reusable polycarbonate sheets and a wood frame; the building is designed to give the impression of floating above the ground. Inside is a screen measuring 9 by 11 metres (30 by 36 ft), which displays a short film about the origin of life.
NTT Pavilion		East Gate	A structure sponsored by the Nippon Telegraph and Telephone Corporation, with three exhibition areas. The facade is covered with fabric pieces and carbon wires that produce sound.
ORA Gaishoku Pavilion		West Gate	A two-story structure sponsored by the Osaka Restaurant Association, with a mural on its facade. Inside, there is a food market and a mural of the Dōtonbori on the first floor, as well as a food-education center on the second floor.
Panasonic Group Pavilion		East Gate	Designed by Yuko Nagayama, the arch-shaped pavilion has overlapping ring motifs and a fabric membrane on its facade. Inside is an interactive exhibit space.
Pasona Natureverse		West Gate	A pavilion designed by Design Labo and Maeda Corporation and composed of two spiral structures. One of the buildings is two stories and 17 metres (56 ft) tall, with a light-pink membrane facade, while the other is shaped like a conch shell.
Sumitomo Pavilion		East Gate	A structure designed by Dentsu Live and Nikken Sekkei. The exterior is inspired by Shikoku's mountains and is made of several 50-year-old cedar trees, as well as 1,000 cypress trees, all from Sumitomo's grove in Niihama. Inside is a theater with a 20-by-7.5-metre (66 by 25 ft) screen.
Tech World Pavilion		West Gate	Main article: Tech World pavilion A pavilion for Taiwan operated by the Tamayama Digital Tech Company (the nation does not have a country-specific pavilion because it is not part of the Bureau International des Expositions). The facade has metal panels, while the interior is decorated with images of Taiwanese landscapes and landmarks, in addition to three theaters.
Yoshimoto Pavilion		West Gate	An orange "smiling sphere" measuring 20 metres (66 ft) tall, with a stage outside and four exhibits inside.
Zeri Japan Blue Ocean Dome		West Gate	A set of three domes designed by Shigeru Ban, made of paper tube, laminated bamboo, and carbon fiber reinforced plastic.

== Other pavilions ==
Name	Image	Zone	Descriptions/Notes
Architecture That Becomes a Forest		Saving Lives	A group of temporary 3D printed structures constructed by Takenaka Corporation. There are two structures, measuring 4.65 metres (15.3 ft) across and 2.95 metres (9 ft 8 in) tall; both are made of a biodegradable plant-based resin.
Grand Ring		Several	Main article: Grand Ring A structure designed by Sou Fujimoto, made of Japanese cedar and cypress, with a circumference of about 2 kilometres (1.2 mi). This structure surrounds the foreign pavilions. As of 2025, it holds a Guinness World Record for the largest wooden architectural structure.
Kansai Pavilion		East Gate	A domestic pavilion sponsored by nine prefectures in the Kansai region (Shiga, Kyoto, Hyogo, Nara, Wakayama, Tottori, Tokushima, Fukui, and Mie).
Women's Pavilion in collaboration with Cartier		East Gate	Designed by Yuko Nagayama and developed by Cartier and the Government of Japan, it has a latticework facade. If one looks closely, it looks like the Japanese pavilion itself from Expo 2020. The facade consists of steel rods connected at ball joints, which are covered by translucent membranes; the pavilion also has plantings such as trees. It is the fair's only women-themed pavilion.
World Expo Museum		Empowering Lives	
