= Fujimoto =

Fujimoto (藤本, 藤元) is a Japanese surname. Notable people with the surname include:

- Akio Fujimoto (藤元明緒; born 1988), film director and screenwriter
- Atsushi Fujimoto (藤本 敦士; born 1977), professional baseball player
- Hideo Fujimoto (藤本 英雄; 1918 – 1997), baseball pitcher
- George I. Fujimoto (1920–2023), American chemist
- Jack Fujimoto, Japanese-American educator
- James Fujimoto, Japanese-American researcher at MIT
- Jungo Fujimoto (藤本 淳吾; born 1984), Japanese football player
- Kenji Fujimoto (藤本 健二; born 1947), purported former sushi chef to Kim Jong Il
- Masashi Fujimoto (藤本 政志; born 1963), Japanese actor and entertainer
- Matsuo Fujimoto (藤本 松夫; 1922 – 1962), a Japanese convict
- Miki Fujimoto (藤本 美貴; born 1985), Japanese musician
- Moeko Fujimoto (藤本 もえこ; born 1992), Japanese ice hockey player
- Nana Fujimoto (藤本 那菜; born 1989), Japanese ice hockey player
- Noriaki Fujimoto (藤本 憲明; born 1989), Japanese footballer
- Sadayoshi Fujimoto (藤本定義; 1904–1981), Japanese baseball manager
- Shihachi Fujimoto, Japanese photographer
- Shun Fujimoto, Japanese gymnast
- Sou Fujimoto, Japanese architect
- Taizo Fujimoto (藤本泰三; born 1869), Japanese author
- Tak Fujimoto, Japanese-American cinematographer
- Takahiro Fujimoto, Japanese medley swimmer
- Tatsuki Fujimoto (藤本 タツキ; born 1993), Japanese manga artist
- Tsukasa Fujimoto, Japanese professional wrestler and actress
- Yuki Fujimoto (藤本 雄基; born 1986), Japanese footballer
- Yutaka Fujimoto (藤本 裕; 1950–2001), Japanese basketball player
- Yuzuru Fujimoto (藤本 譲; 1935–2019), Japanese voice actor

== Fictional characters ==
- Fujimoto, character in the film Ponyo on the Cliff by the Sea
- Abby Fujimoto, character in the television series Flight 29 Down
- Kiyokazu Fujimoto, protagonist of the manga series Kobato
- Fujimoto, antagonist of the games "Octodad" and "Octodad: Dadliest Catch"

== See also ==
- Fujimoto Photo Industries Co. Ltd.
