= Plantagon =

- Industry: Urban agriculture
- Founded: January 29, 2008; 18 years ago in Stockholm, Sweden
- Founder: Hans Hassle
- Defunct: February 15, 2019
- Fate: Bankrupted
- Headquarters: Stockholm, Sweden
- Key people: Oren Lyons; Owe Pettersson; Sidney Hill
- Website: plantagon.com

Plantagon International AB is a defunct Swedish company founded by Hans Hassle and the Native American indigenous people of Onondaga Nation on January 29, 2008. Up until February 2016 Hans Hassle was CEO and Professor Oren R. Lyons was chairman of the board. Starting February 2016, Owe Pettersson is CEO and Sidney Hill is chairman of the board. Plantagon is active within the sector of Urban Agriculture and is developing technology for industrial scale food production in cities.

The company built a vertical farm, the company's premier project, in Linköping. The Swedish authority “the Delegation for Sustainable Cities” also provided financial support to carry out a feasibility study for the possible establishment of a vertical greenhouse in Botkyrka and Helsingborg. Plantagon also established the Tongji-Plantagon Research Center in April 2013 in collaboration with Tongji University in Shanghai and have its Asian office in Singapore.

Plantagon's innovation consisted of minimizing the need for artificial lighting through efficient architecture and a so-called vertical food production line which moved plants from ceiling to floor at a slow pace throughout their growing cycle.

The business concept was based on a vision to feed the world's growing population by producing food directly to the consumers within urban areas. These vertical greenhouses would reduce resources such as arable land, water, energy and pesticides as well as transportation.

Groundbreaking ceremony for the construction of the vertical farm in Linköping was held in early 2012.

On February 15, 2019, Plantagon International AB's board of directors declared bankruptcy.

== International recognition ==
In 2010, Plantagon represented Sweden at the Swedish Pavilion during the World Expo in Shanghai. In October 2012 Plantagon received the Swedish-American Chamber of Commerce Deloitte Green Award presented by His Majesty Carl XVI Gustav of Sweden.
