= Hans Hassle =

Swedish businessman (born 1959)

Hans Hassle (born 1959) is a Swedish businessman who focuses on corporate social responsibility. He runs the management consultancy company evolution? AB and was the General Secretary of Plantagon International Association.

== Biography ==
Hans Hassle worked as a freelance journalist between 1981 and 1986 focusing on travel journalism. He, amongst other things, was portraying indigenous peoples from places such as Tibet, Indonesia, and New Zealand. In 1986 he had a story published in People Magazine from his time on the Indonesian island Siberut, where he lived with the animist Mentawei tribe.

Hassle has been working with social entrepreneurship, corporate social responsibility (CSR), and brand management since 1986. He founded the Swedish communication agency Vision and Reality Communication NetWork AB in 1986 and spent 15 years as its CEO. In 1989 Hassle developed the notion of Event Marketing and together with Procter & Gamble used the facade of the Ericsson Globe to draw attention to the new product Ariel.

In 1989, Hassle, together with former head of the department of culture in Rättvik, Åsa Nyman, and former CEO of Draggängarnas limestone quarry, Margareta Dellefors, established the first working group for the development of outdoor area Dalhalla in Rättvik.

Hassle was in 2001 appointed member of the Central Ethical Review Board at the Karolinska Institute in Stockholm by the Swedish government.

Hassle has been a member of the steering committee of the Swedish Geopark project Meteorum since 2010.

Since 2008 Hassle is the CEO and General Secretary of Plantagon. The company is founded by Hassle and the Native American Onondaga Nation. Hassle was the first European citizen to ever be appointed CEO and General Secretary of a company owned by a Native American nation and run outside of the United States.

== Corporate social responsibility ==
Since 1986, Hassle has been working with social entrepreneurship and corporate social responsibility (CSR). In 1992 he protected the brand Corporate Citizenship.

In 2004, Hassle co-authored together Christina Carsten, professor at the Stockholm Center for Organizational Research, the Global Compact Research Report Sweden which is a report monitoring attitudes towards the UN's recommendations on "Good Corporate Citizenship".

Hassle has developed a new business model called the Companization - a hybrid of a non-profit association and a for-profit company that incorporates moral values into an otherwise economic forum by implementing the Earth Charter and the United Nations Global Compact into the articles of association of the company.

== International recognition ==
In 2012, Hassle became an official member of the World Entrepreneurship Forum and joined the Forum’s Think Tank as one of 88 members.

Hassle was in 2010 and 2011 nominated Sustainable Leader of the Year by the Swedish Association of Environmental Managers. In 2012, he was awarded CEO of the Year, Sweden, by European CEO as well as received the World Finance 100 award in 2012.

== Family ==
Hassle is married to Karin Hassle, glass artist. Together they have two children.

== Bibliography ==
Co-author of the Global Compact Research Report Sweden published by UN Global Compact in 2004.

Author of the book "Business as Usual is over" (ISBN 978-91-980170-0-7), published in 2012.
