= Ya mong =

Ya mong' is a home remedy that is widely used in Thailand. Its exact composition may vary, but is usually a combination of various herbs, each with a different medicinal purpose. Each ingredient creates a different color or smell. Its ingredients may include menthol, paraffin, petroleum jelly, borneol, camphor, and methyl salicylate. It is used for headaches, dizziness, nausea, vomiting, myalgia, and arthropod bites and stings.
