= Singapore pavilion at Expo 2010 =

Pavilion in Shanghai

The Singapore Pavilion

Singapore's participation in the World Expo 2010 was its largest to date at the World Expo, signifying its strong and close bilateral ties with China. The Singapore pavilion showcased Singapore's achievements in urban planning, water technology and environmental services while promoting closer people-to-people relations between China and Singapore. The pavilion also highlighted Singapore's ability to offer a high-quality and integrated environment to live, work and play within a compact area through sustainable planning and development.

== Singapore pavilion ==
The Singapore pavilion was designed to resemble a "music box", whose sound could be heard by visitors even before they entered. Its exhibition sections of different shapes were linked by gentle slopes and stairs. It integrated different design elements - music fountain, audio visual interplay and distinctive flowers on the roof garden, manifesting the harmony between cities and nature, as well as Singapore's originality and diverse cultures. Four columns of varying sizes supported its structural system and floors above, symbolising Singapore’s races living, working and playing together on the same ground. Ramps and stairs suspended off trusses led to the upper floors.

== Theme ==
The theme Urban Symphony (Chinese: 城市交响曲; pinyin: Chéngshì Jiāoxiǎngqǔ) was inspired by the harmony of unique elements in Singapore: Progress and sustainability, urbanisation and greenery, tradition and modernity and the different races living in harmony together. The two environmental areas that Singapore has successfully made headway with in balancing progress with sustainability – water and garden – formed the softscape of the pavilion as its two design elements.

== Design ==
The ground floor of the pavilion showcased projected images, live theatre performances and activities within the atrium space and main hall. Singapore exhibits were also displayed along the ramp up to the next floor.

A 600sqm column-free second floor hosted an amphitheatre screening videos of Singapore to reveal lesser known aspects beyond its economic success, such as its creativity, cultural diversity and natural beauty.

- There 'A Garden in the Sky' – a rooftop garden of tropical flora landscaped to re-capture the essence and the beauty of living in a garden city.
- Urban Symphony aimed to articulate Singapore’s rhythm and beat through the Pavilion’s architecture of water fountain movements, window and sunshade fins layouts on the façade, interplay of sounds and visuals on different levels and a mélange of flora on the roof garden.
- In line with the theme of sustainability, recyclable materials such as aluminum and steel were used for the facade and structural framework, and the foundation made of spun piles with only the foundations, floor slabs and columns built of reinforced concrete.
- The design incorporated façade slits and chilled water along the perimeter of the ground floor to encourage a cool breeze in the heat of summer and to reduce energy consumption on air-conditioning.

== Dendrobium Singapore Shanghai Symphony ==
Dendrobium Singapore Shanghai Symphony (Chinese: 新沪交响曲; pinyin: Xīn-Hù Jiāoxiǎngqǔ) is an orchid hybrid exclusively created to commemorate Singapore’s participation in the World Expo 2010 Shanghai China. The striking jade and gold-hued hybrid is adorned with delicate parallel veins, symbolising the beauty of Singapore and Shanghai and the two cities’ correspondent transformation into vibrant global destinations. The resilient nature of the hybrid reflects the strong bilateral relations between China and Singapore who joined together at the World Expo 2010 Shanghai China to share approaches to innovation and sustainable development. It also underlined the Singapore Pavilion’s overarching theme Urban Symphony.

== Logo ==
The visually distinctive and endearingly memorable Singapore Pavilion logo was conceived by Singapore design firm Epigram. The logo, inspired by the pavilion design and musical instruments, such as the chimes, piano and xylophone, resonated with the serendipity, fun and delight that awaited visitors to Singapore’s Urban Symphony.

The colour red, which represents Singapore, evokes passion and featured prominently in the logo design. The element of red in Singapore’s national flag symbolises "universal brotherhood and equality of man”. Traditionally, in Chinese culture red is also widely known as an auspicious colour, associated with happiness. The colour gradient in the logo embodied Singapore’s continuous efforts to balance sustainability and innovation amidst the urban vibrancy of our city state’s transforming landscape. Grey echoed the island-state’s modernity.

== Mascot ==
Drawing inspiration from Singapore's iconic Merlion and The King of Fruits, the Durian, Singapore Tourism Board conceived Liu Lian Xiao Xing as mascot. Liu Lian Xiao Xing is a five-year-old Singaporean boy who travels around the world with his musician parents. In 2010, his parents will be travelled to Shanghai for the World Expo 2010, allowing Liu Lian Xiao Xing to realise his dream of visiting China.

The Liu Lian Xiao Xing character was an open, friendly and upbeat boy whose friends loved having him around because he was always so bubbly and makes them laugh. An inquisitive boy with endless questions, he was always learning, always eager for more and always seeking explanations. He wore red overalls emblazoned with a picture of the Merlion in homage to his favourite toy – a Merlion beanie. His cap, shaped just like a durian was inspired by his love of the fruit and his sketches of the Esplanade!

Liu Lian Xiao Xing loved to eat diverse and sumptuous Singapore delights like black pepper and chilli crab durians, Hainanese chicken rice, laksa lemak and roti prata, and had recently discovered a new favourite dish, Shanghainese xiao long bao.

He was fond of drawing durians as well as his favourite building, the iconic Esplanade – Theatre on the Bay, one of the world's busiest arts centres, hiking at the Bukit Timah Nature Reserve, picnicking at the Botanic Gardens with his family. He enjoyed playing the piano, violin and ethnic instruments such the Chinese erhu and the Indian tabla which he learnt from his parents.

== Milestones ==
June 2009 - Commencement of pavilion construction

November 2009 – Pavilion topping out ceremony

April 2010 - Completion of pavilion construction & preview of the pavilion

1 May 2010 - Official pavilion opening ceremony

31 October 2010 - Official pavilion closing ceremony

1 November – 31 December 2010 - Dismantling of pavilion

== Books ==
- Bureau of Shanghai World Expo Coordination (April 2010). EXPO 2010 SHANGHAI CHINA OFFICIAL GUIDEBOOK. China: China Publishing Group Corporation. pp. 74–74. ISBN 978-7-5473-0164-7.
