= Sou Fujimoto =

Japanese architect (born 1971)

- 藤本 壮介
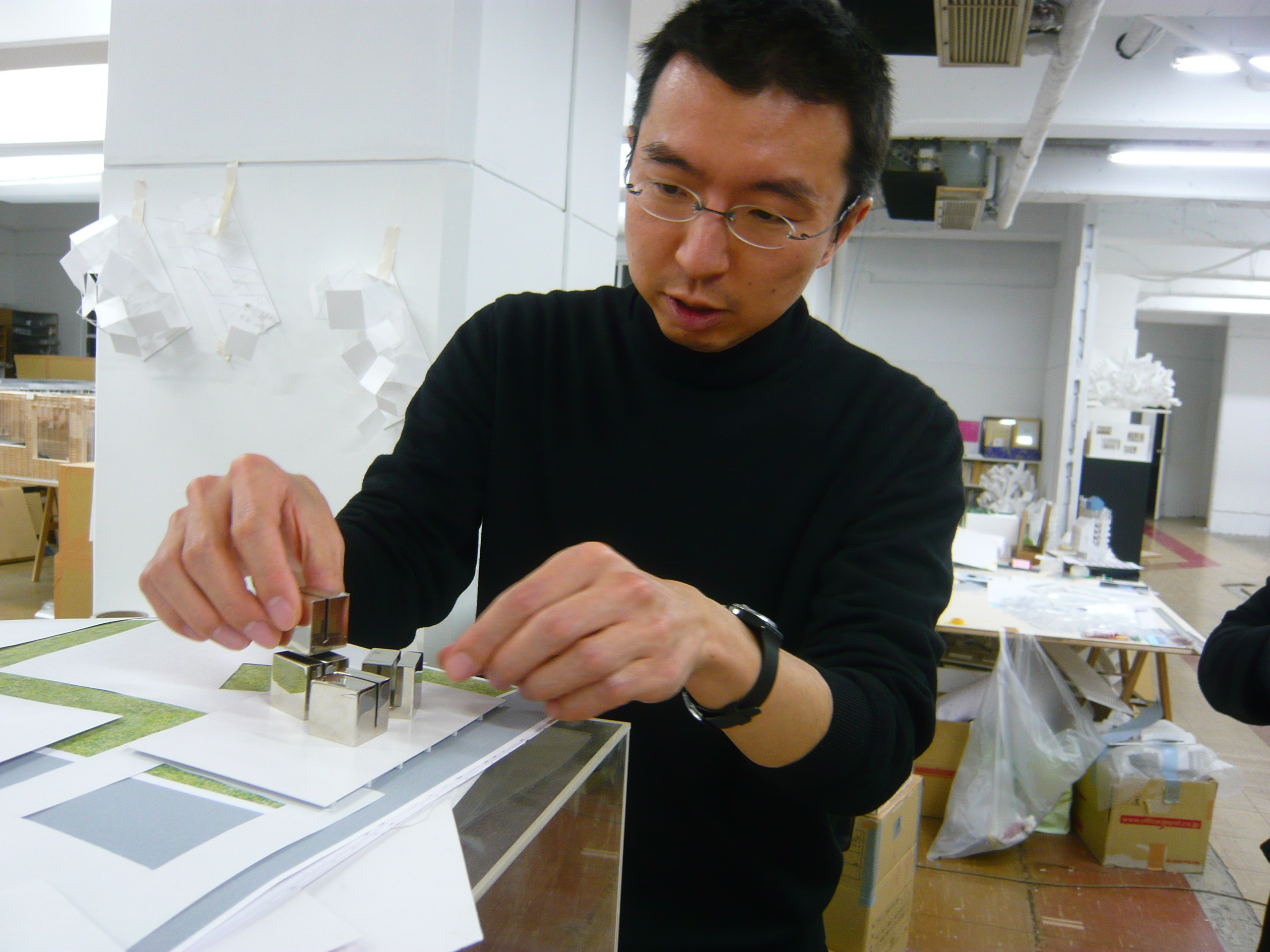
- (2009)
- Born: 1971 (age 54–55); Higashikagura, Hokkaido, Japan
- Education: University of Tokyo École Spéciale d'Architecture
- Occupation: Architect
- Organization: Sou Fujimoto Architects
- Website: www.sou-fujimoto.net

Sou Fujimoto (藤本 壮介, Fujimoto Sōsuke; born 1971) is a Japanese architect.

== Early life and education ==
Born in Hokkaido in 1971, he graduated from the University of Tokyo in 1994, and established his own office, Sou Fujimoto Architects, in 2000.

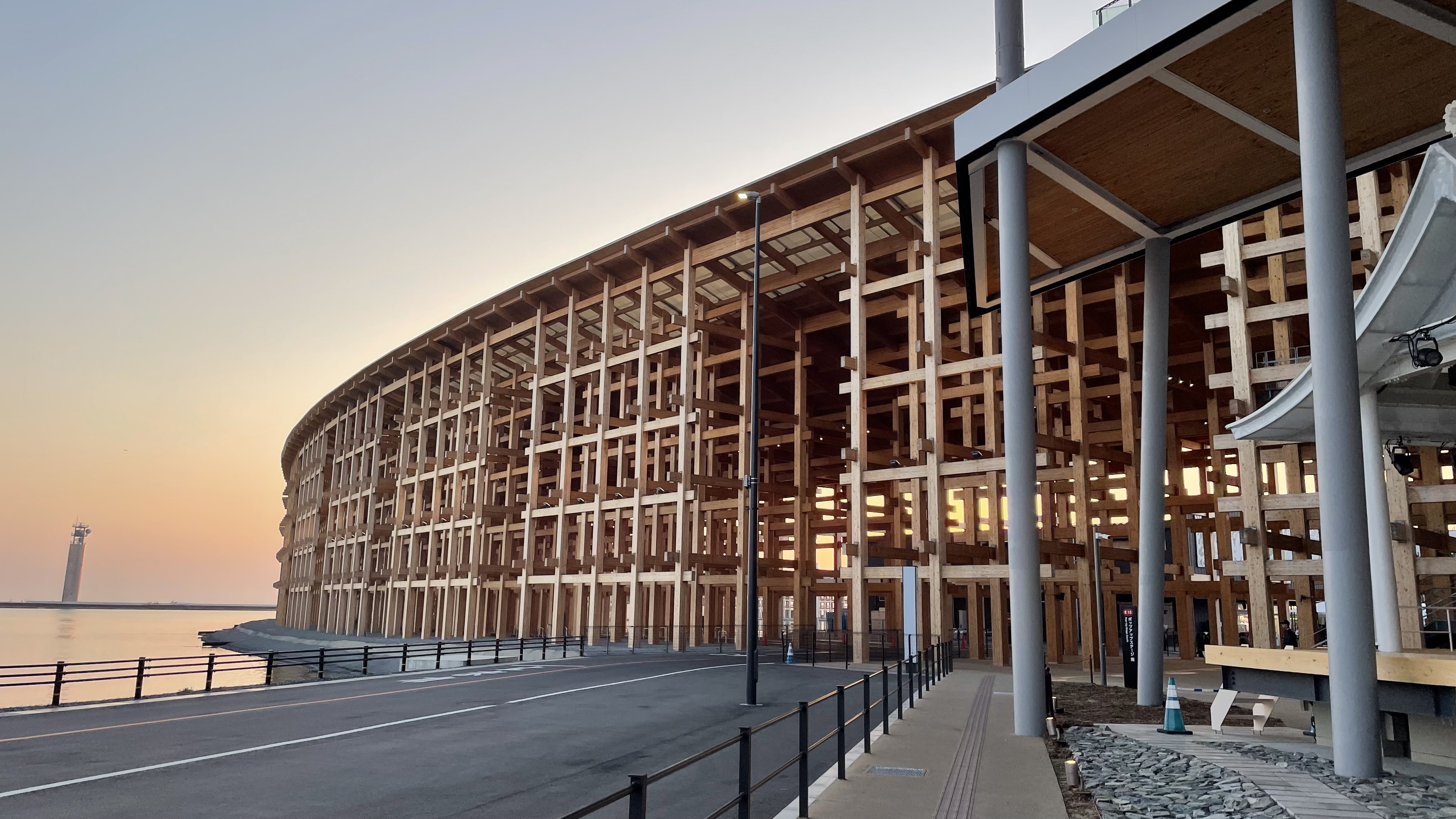
The Grand Ring, Osaka Expo 2025

== Career ==
After establishing Sou Fujimoto Architects in 2000, Fujimoto went on to design buildings across Japan and Europe. Many of his designs are built around his idea that the function of a building is decided by human behavior. In 2019, Fujimoto was selected as one of 23 architects to "reinvent" Paris. His contributions to this project include a redesign of a plot in the 17th arrondissement of Paris. He will chair the Holcim Foundation Awards 2025 jury for region Asia Pacific.

Noted for delicate light structures and permeable enclosures, Fujimoto designed several houses, and in 2013, was selected to design the temporary Serpentine Gallery pavilion in London. In 2021, Fujimoto received the master's degree from l'École Spéciale d'Architecture in Paris.

Fujimoto published a book in 2008 called Sou Fujimoto: Primitive Future. It contains an overview of his projects up to that date, and it explains his concept of primitive future and how he uses it in his work.

== Selected works ==
- Hana Building Nice, Côté D’azur 2026
- Final Wooden House, Kumamoto, 2005–08
- Children's Centre for Psychiatric Rehabilitation, Hokkaido, Japan, 2006
- T House, Gunma, Japan, 2006–2010
- N House, Oita, 2008
- House before House, Utsunomiya, 2009
- Tokyo Apartment, Tabashi-ku, Tokyo, 2006–10
- Musashino Art University Museum and Library, Tokyo, Japan, 2010
- Toilet in Nature, Chiba, Japan, 2012
- House K, Nishinomiya, Hyogo, Japan, 2011–2013
- Serpentine Gallery Pavilion, London, 2013
- Bus Stop in Krumbach, Austria, 2014
- Cloud Pavilion, outside National Art Gallery, Tiranë, Albania, 2016
- Naoshima Pavilion, Naoshima, Kagawa, Japan, 2016
- L'Arbre Blanc, Montpellier, France, 2017 (est.)
- House of Hungarian Music, Budapest, Hungary, 2022
- Mille Arbres (A Thousand Trees), Paris, France, 2016–2023 (est.)
- Grand Ring, Osaka, Japan.
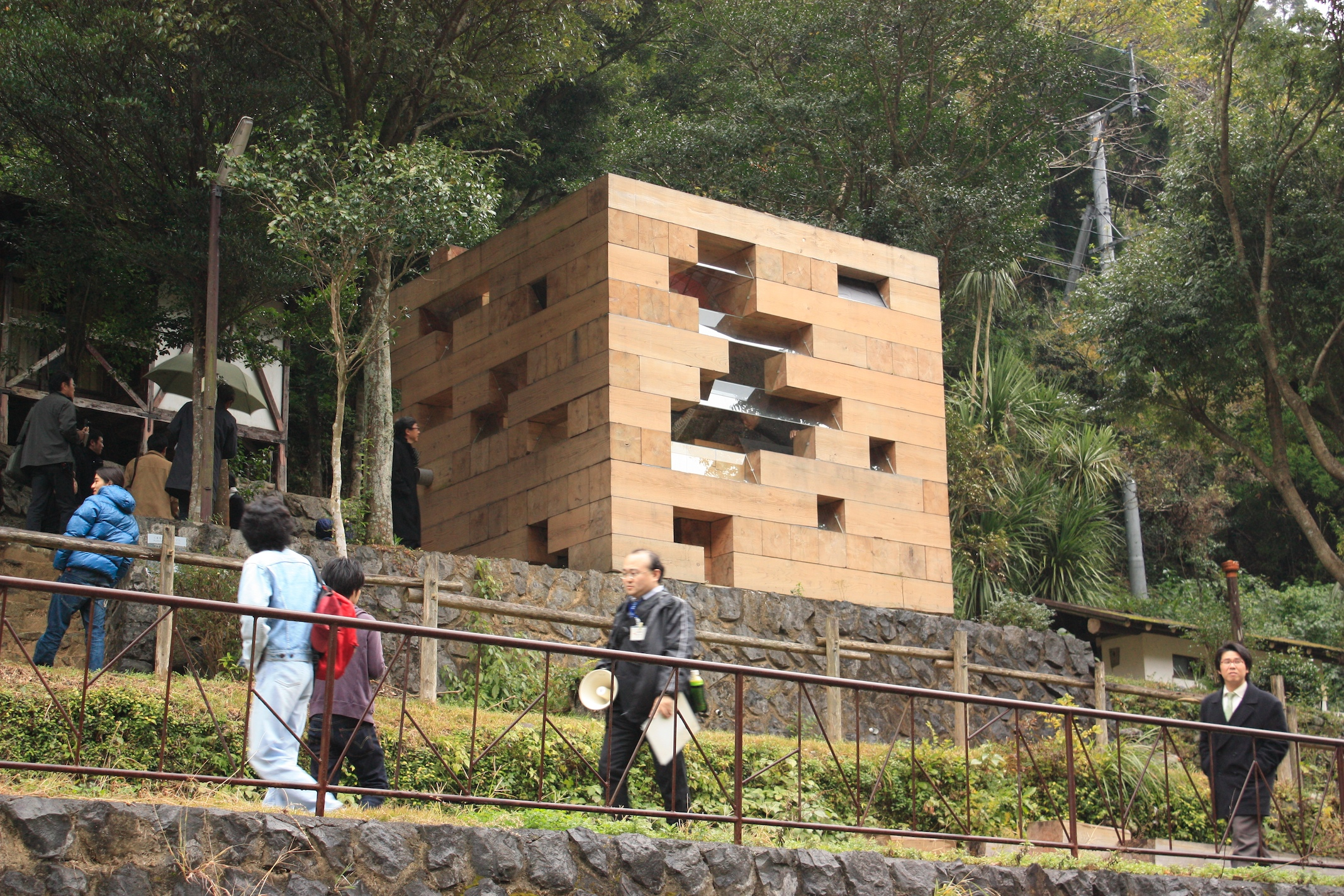
Final Wooden House

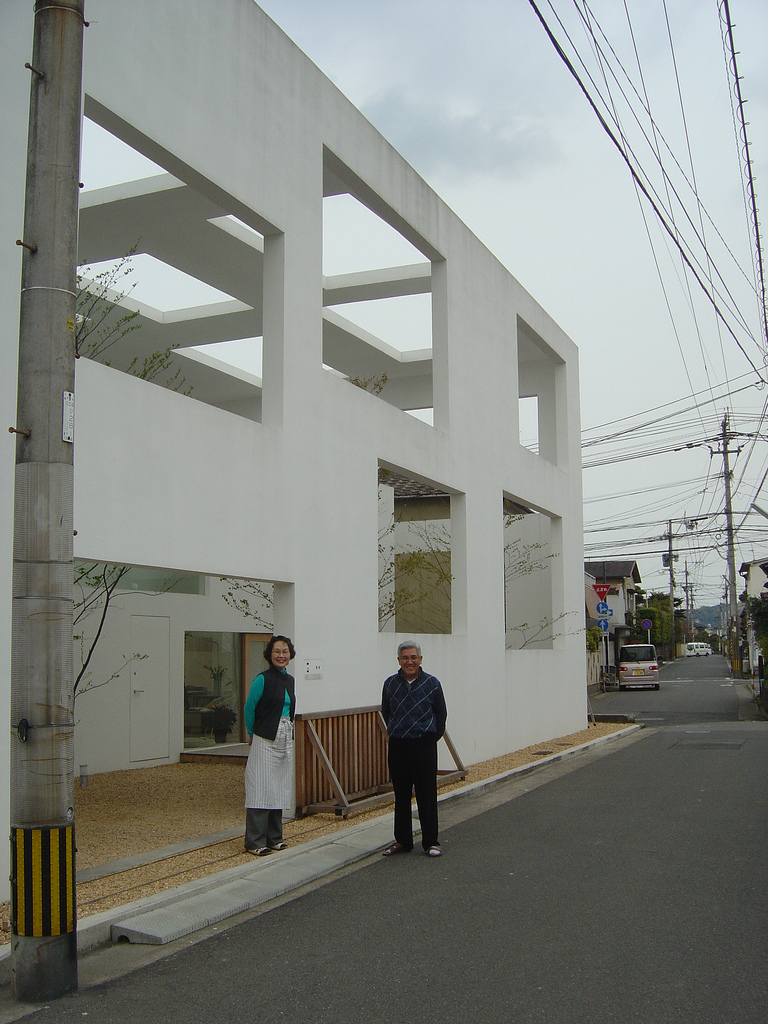
N House

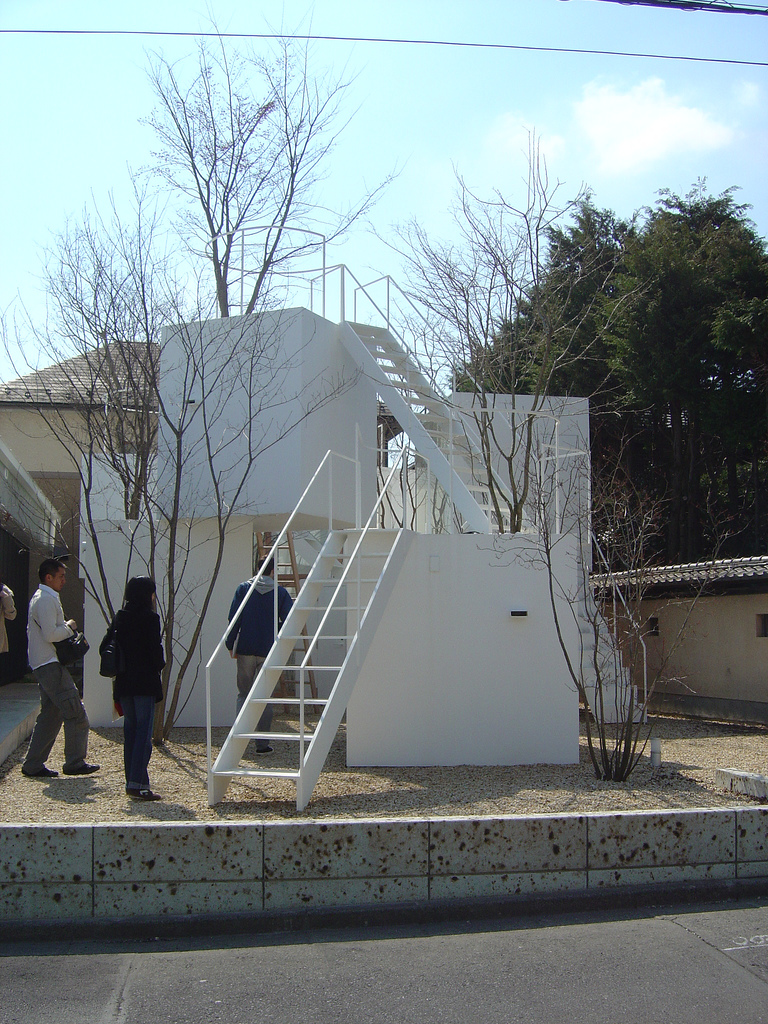
House before House, Utsunomiya

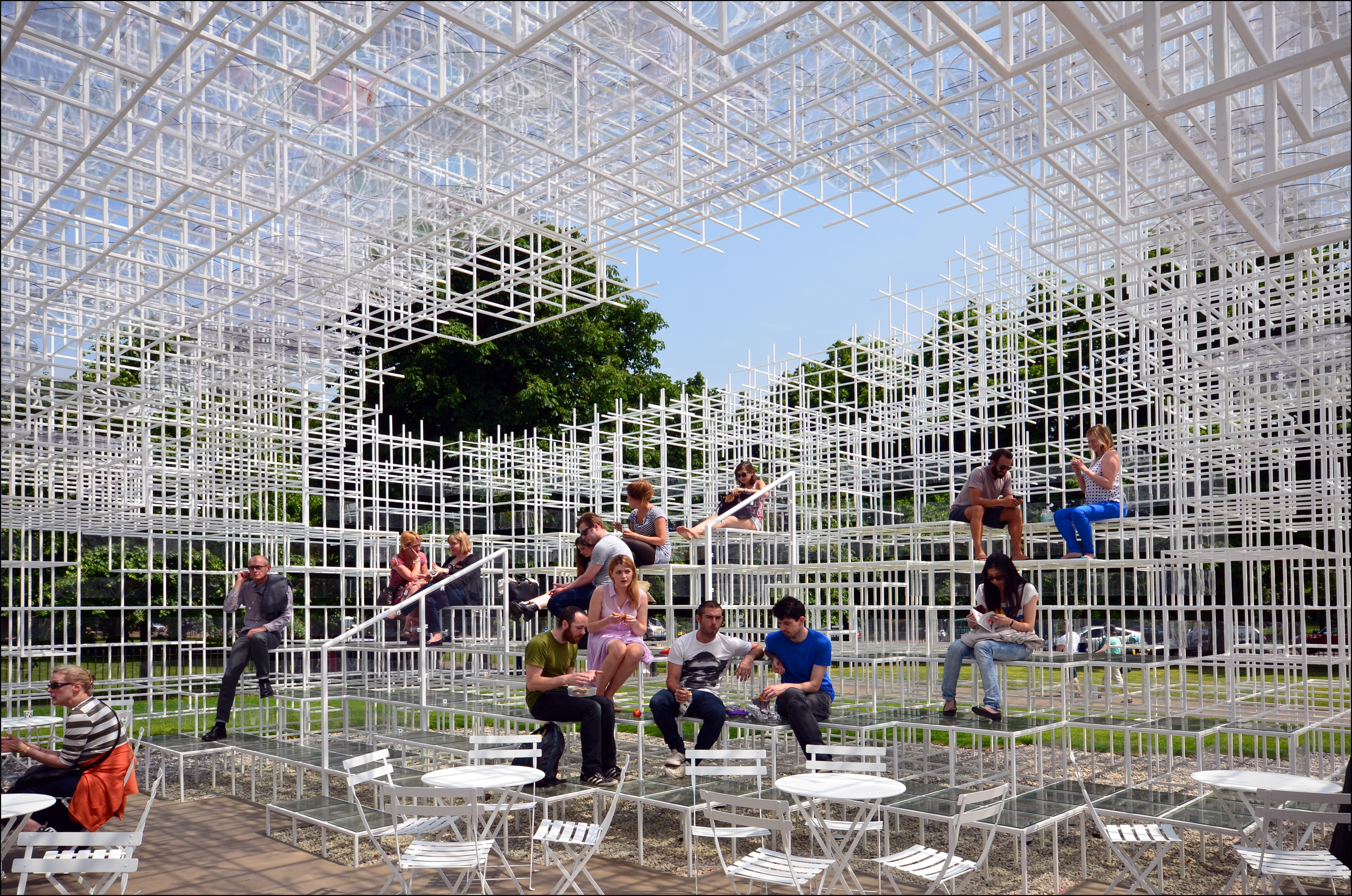
Serpentine Gallery Pavilion, London

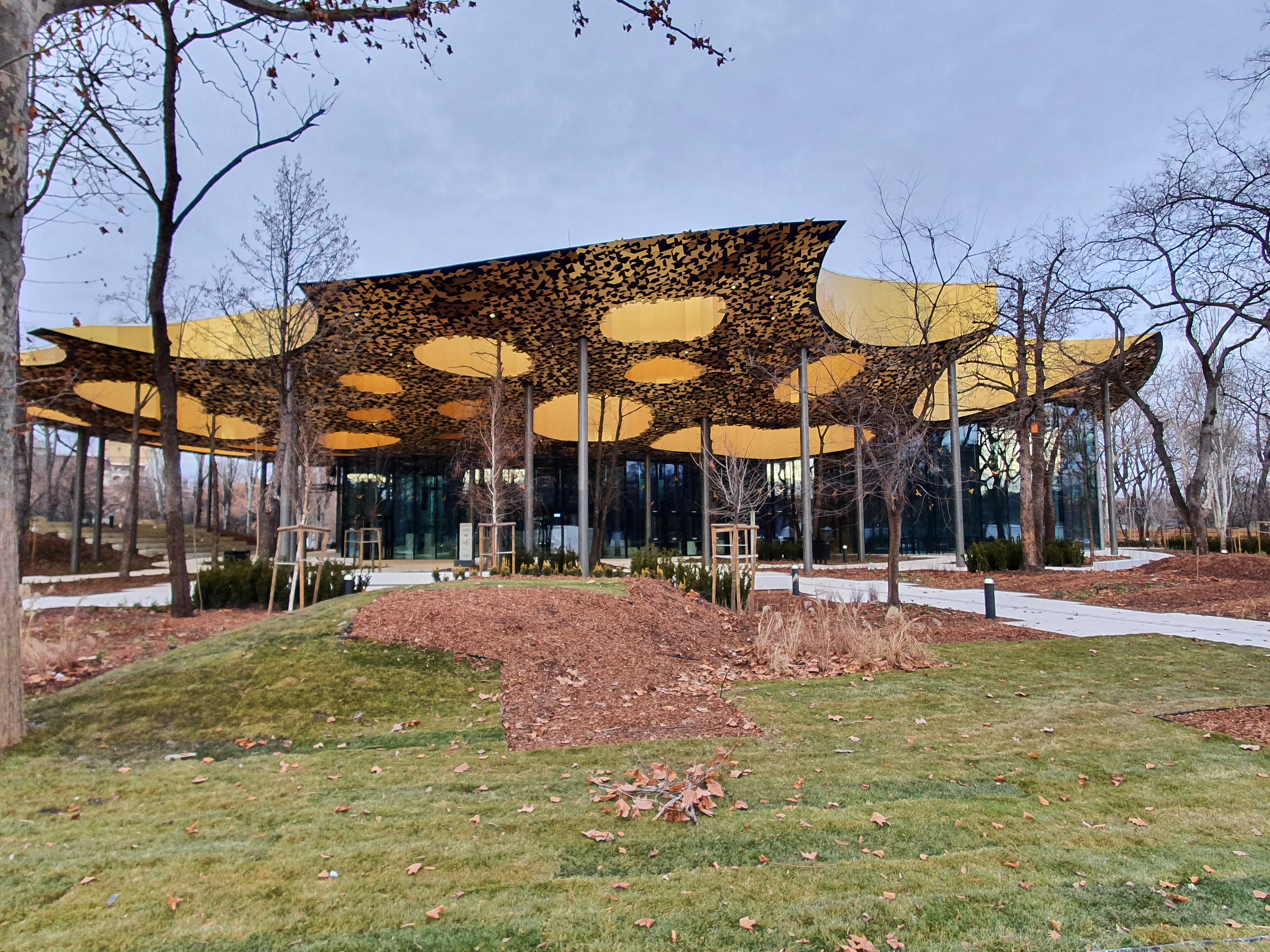
House of Hungarian Music, Budapest

== Awards ==
- JIA New Face Award, 2004
- International Design Competition for the Environment Art Forum, 1st Prize, 2004
- Wooden House Competition, Kumamoto, 1st Prize, 2005
- Architectural Review Award Grand Prize, 2006
- Kenneth F. Brown Architecture Design Award, 2007
- Japanese Institute of Architecture Grand Prize, 2008
- Wallpaper Design Award, 2009
- Taiwan Tower International Competition: First Prize, 2011
- Marcus Prize for Architecture, 2013
- Kyoto Global Design Awards Best100, 2023
