= Tech World pavilion =

Pavilion at Expo 2025

TECH WORLD Pavilion
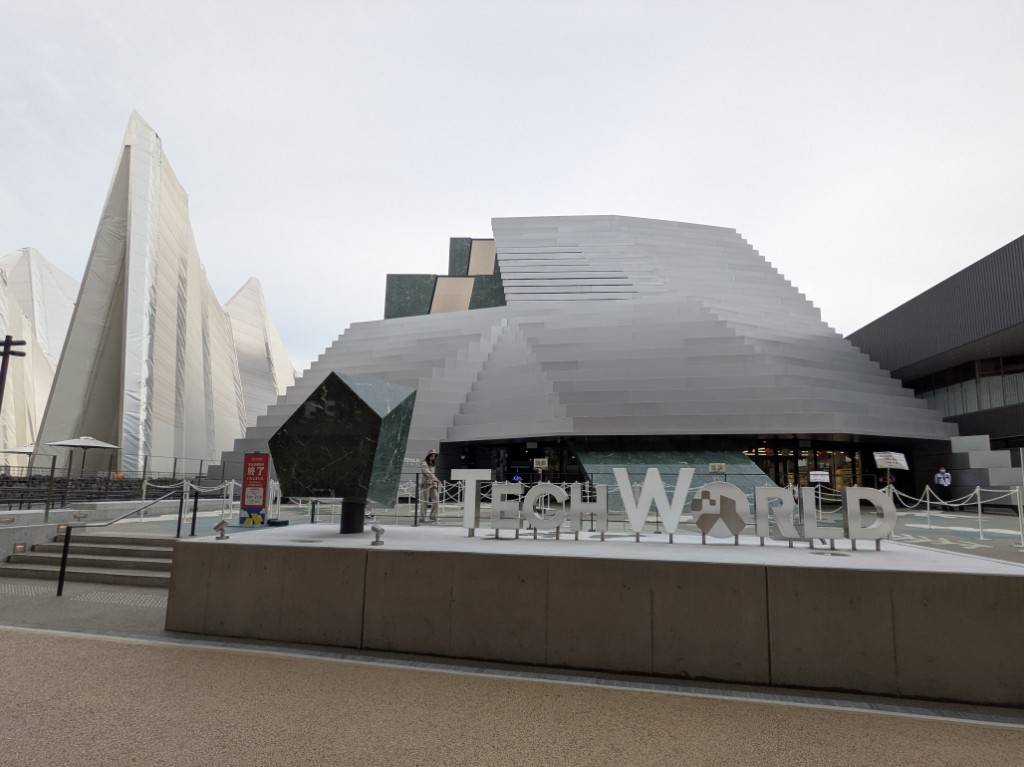
- The exterior of the pavilion during the Expo 2025
- Interactive map of the TECH WORLD Pavilion area

General information
- Status: Completed
- Type: Pavilion
- Location: (Japan) Osaka, Konohana, Yumeshima Island
- Owner: Tamayama Digital Tech Company; Taiwan External Trade Development Council

Website
- www.expo2025-techworld.com/TechWorld2025/wSite/mp?mp=2

The Tech World Pavilion is one of the private sector pavilions at the Osaka-Kansai Expo 2025. However, this is technically a pavilion of Taiwan hosted by the Tamayama Digital Tech Company, a company established by Taiwan External Trade Development Council (TAITRA), as the nation does not have a country-specific pavilion because it is not part of the Bureau International des Expositions.

== Description ==
The pavilion is located outside of the Grand Ring, along with the domestic pavilions due to its status as a private sector pavilion. The exhibitions of the pavilion uses tablets manufactured by ASUS, and includes artworks of Taiwanese artists. At the end of the exhibitions, an artificial intelligence informs visitors which themes they were most impressed by from their heartbeat records.

== Name and concept ==
The name "Tech World" is believed to be a reference to Taiwan's country code "TW". The pavilion's concept is "to be better together" (共好), and the pavilion is split into three sections, "life", "nature", and "future".

== Controversy ==
The existence of a de facto pavilion dedicated for Taiwan drew backlash from the People's Republic of China. Zhu Fenglian claimed that the Democratic Progressive Party is seeking to confuse the world and commented "repeating such acts will not change the fact that Taiwan is a part of China". To avoid confusion, the Ministry of Foreign Affairs of Japan requested Taiwan clearly state the pavilion's status as a private sector pavilion.
