= Fujimoto Photo Industries Co. Ltd. =

Manufacturing company

Fujimoto is a Japanese company that produces photographic equipment; particularly lab systems, enlargers and slide projectors. It was initially founded in 1913 to make equipment, became established as Fujimoto Mfg Co (Fujimoto Seisakusho, 藤本製作所) in 1933, and began the production of cameras in 1934 and the production of enlargers in 1935. Some cameras were distributed by the Fukada Shōkai (深田商会) company. All activity stopped in 1945. In 1950 it was revived as Fujimoto Camera Mfg Co (Fujimoto Shashinki Seisakusho, 藤本写真機製作所). It very soon dropped the production of cameras, and it became Fujimoto Photo Industries Co Ltd (Fujimoto Shashin Kōgyō Kabushiki Kaisha, 藤本写真工業株式会社) in 1966.

== 4.5×6 folders ==
- Semi Prince (1934), with Schneider lenses and German shutters, distributed by Fukada Shōkai
- Semi Lucky (1937)
- Semi Sport (1940), Fujimoto Rapidex shutter
- Semi Luck (1950)

The name Lucky is still used by Fujimoto for enlargers.

== Other ==
Other cameras named Prince are often attributed to Fujimoto:

- Prince, 6.5×9 folding plate
- Prince Peerless, 6.5×9 folding plate
- Pocket Prince, 4×6.5 folding
- Prince Flex, 6×6 TLR, probably made by Neumann & Heilemann
