= Taizo Fujimoto =

Taizo Fujimoto (Japanese: 藤本泰三) (b. 1869), was a Japanese author and proprietor of the Eibunsha.

== Life ==
He was the oldest son of Shunma Fujimoto, and was born in Kochi city in February 1869. He graduated from the Tokyo First High Middle School, and then studied at the law college of the Tokyo Imperial University for two years. He subsequently served as a middle school English teacher, an English editor in publishing, an importing and exporting manager and a foreign firm's sectional chief. In October 1899, he married Yoshiko, eldest daughter of Giichiro Koide, lawyer and chairman of the Tokushima Municipal Assembly.

== Works ==
=== The Nightside of Japan ===
The Nightside of Japan is a book by Taizo Fujimoto, published in October 1914 by T Werner Laurie in London.

The book was reviewed by The Times Literary Supplement, The New York Times Review of Books, The Asiatic Review, The Bookman, The Argonaut, The Nation, The Lancet and The Tatler.

=== The Story of the Geisha Girl ===
The Story of the Geisha Girl is a book by Taizo Fujimoto, published in 1917.

The book was reviewed by The Asiatic Review, The Nation, and The Era.
