= Expo 2020 pavilions =

Coordinates: 24°58′07.2″N 55°09′09.0″E

entrance portal at EXPO 2020

Expo 2020 (Arabic: إكسبو 2020) was a World Expo hosted by Dubai in the United Arab Emirates from 1 October 2021 to 31 March 2022. There are 200 pavilions in Expo 2020 Dubai, out of which 193 are representatives of participating countries. The following nations and organizations are participating in Expo 2020:

== List of countries' pavilions ==
Name	Image	Sub theme
Afghanistan		Opportunity
Albania		Mobility
Algeria		Mobility
Andorra		Sustainability
Angola		Mobility
Antigua and Barbuda		Mobility
Argentina		Opportunity
Armenia		Opportunity
Australia		Mobility
Austria		Opportunity
Azerbaijan		Sustainability
Bahamas		Sustainability
Bahrain		Opportunity
Bangladesh		Sustainability
Barbados		Mobility
Belarus		Opportunity
Belgium		Mobility
Belize		Opportunity
Benin		Sustainability
Bhutan		Opportunity
Bolivia		Mobility
Bosnia and Herzegovina		Opportunity
Botswana		Mobility
Brazil		Sustainability
Brunei		Opportunity
Bulgaria		Mobility
Burkina Faso		Sustainability
Burundi		Opportunity
(Cape Verde) Cabo Verde		Mobility
Cambodia		Sustainability
Cameroon		Opportunity
Canada		Sustainability
Central African Republic		Sustainability
Chad		Opportunity
Chile		Mobility
People's Republic of China		Opportunity
Colombia		Opportunity
Comoros		Sustainability
Congo		Opportunity
Costa Rica		Mobility
(Ivory Coast) Côte d'Ivoire		Mobility
Croatia		Mobility
Cuba		Sustainability
Cyprus		Opportunity
Czech Republic		Sustainability
Denmark		Mobility
Djibouti		Mobility
Dominica		Mobility
Dominican Republic		Mobility
DR Congo		Opportunity
Egypt		Opportunity
El Salvador		Mobility
Equatorial Guinea		Sustainability
Eritrea		Mobility
Estonia		Mobility
Eswatini		Mobility
Ethiopia		Opportunity
Fiji		Opportunity
Finland		Mobility
France		Mobility
Gabon		Sustainability
Gambia		Mobility
Georgia		Sustainability
Germany		Sustainability
Ghana		Opportunity
Greece		Sustainability
Grenada		Mobility
Guatemala		Opportunity
Guinea		Sustainability
Guinea-Bissau		Opportunity
Guyana		Opportunity
Haiti		Mobility
Holy See		Mobility
Honduras		Opportunity
Hungary		Mobility
India		Opportunity
Indonesia		Opportunity
Iran		Mobility
Iraq		Opportunity
Ireland		Mobility
Israel		Opportunity
Italy		Opportunity
Jamaica		Mobility
Japan		Opportunity
Jordan		Mobility
Kazakhstan		Opportunity
Kenya		Opportunity
Kiribati		Mobility
Kosovo		Mobility
Kuwait		Sustainability
Kyrgyzstan		Opportunity
Laos		Mobility
Latvia		Opportunity
Lebanon		Opportunity
Lesotho		Sustainability
Liberia		Opportunity
Libya		Mobility
Lithuania		Sustainability
Luxembourg		Opportunity
Madagascar		Sustainability
Malawi		Opportunity
Malaysia		Sustainability
Maldives		Sustainability
Mali		Opportunity
Malta		Opportunity
Marshall Islands		Opportunity
Mauritania		Mobility
Mauritius		Opportunity
Mexico		Mobility
Micronesia		Mobility
Moldova		Mobility
Monaco		Opportunity
Mongolia		Mobility
Montenegro		Sustainability
Morocco		Opportunity
Mozambique		Sustainability
Myanmar		Opportunity
Namibia		Opportunity
Nauru		Mobility
Nepal		Mobility
Netherlands		Sustainability
New Zealand		Sustainability
Nicaragua		Mobility
Niger		Mobility
Nigeria		Opportunity
North Macedonia		Mobility
Norway		Opportunity
Oman		Mobility
Pakistan		Opportunity
Palau		Mobility
Palestine		Opportunity
Panama		Mobility
Papua New Guinea		Sustainability
Paraguay		Mobility
Peru		Mobility
Philippines		Sustainability
Poland		Mobility
Portugal		Sustainability
Qatar		Opportunity
Romania		Sustainability
Russia		Mobility
Rwanda		Opportunity
Saint Kitts and Nevis		Sustainability
Saint Lucia		Opportunity
Saint Vincent and the Grenadines		Opportunity
Samoa		Opportunity
San Marino		Opportunity
São Tomé and Príncipe		Sustainability
Saudi Arabia		Opportunity
Senegal		Mobility
Serbia		Mobility
Seychelles		Sustainability
Sierra Leone		Opportunity
Singapore		Sustainability
Slovakia		Mobility
Slovenia		Sustainability
Solomon Islands		Opportunity
Somalia		Opportunity
South Africa		Opportunity
South Korea		Mobility
South Sudan		Opportunity
Spain		Sustainability
Sri Lanka		Opportunity
Sudan		Mobility
Suriname		Sustainability
Sweden		Sustainability
Switzerland		Opportunity
Syria		Mobility
Tajikistan		Sustainability
Tanzania		Mobility
Thailand		Mobility
Timor-Leste		Opportunity
Togo		Mobility
Tonga		Opportunity
Trinidad and Tobago		Mobility
Tunisia		Opportunity
Turkey		Sustainability
Turkmenistan		Mobility
Tuvalu		Mobility
Uganda		Opportunity
Ukraine		Opportunity
United Arab Emirates		Opportunity
United Kingdom		Opportunity
United States		Opportunity
Uruguay		Mobility
Uzbekistan		Sustainability
Vanuatu		Mobility
Venezuela		Opportunity
Vietnam		Opportunity
Yemen		Sustainability
Zambia		Opportunity
Zimbabwe		Opportunity

== List of pavilions of organizations ==
Name	Image	Sub theme	area	architect	notes
African Union		Opportunity			The pavilion is divided into three areas: Our History, Our Change and Our Heritage.
Arab League		Opportunity			
ASEAN		Mobility			
Dubai Cares		Opportunity		PICO	
Gulf Cooperation Council		Opportunity		Concept Architect	
Investment Corporation of Dubai		Opportunity		ALEC FIT OUT	
Muslim World League		Mobility			
Organisation of Islamic Cooperation		Mobility			
United Arab Emirates University		Mobility		BASE Engineering, TODO, F&M	
World Expo Museum		Mobility		Shanghai Modern National Ex.	

== List of partner-pavilions ==
Name	Image	Sub theme	area	architect	notes
DP World		Opportunity		Yaghmour Architects	The pavilion will become a permanent faculty for logistics after Expo 2020.
Dubai Electricity and Water Authority		Sustainability			
Emirates		Opportunity		Pulse Group	
Emirates National Oil Company		Opportunity	2060 m²	Jack Morton	
PepsiCo		Mobility			Bolt, sponsored by von Gatorade
PepsiCo		Opportunity			Plus, sponsored by Pepsi and Lay's
PepsiCo		Sustainability			Drop, sponsored by Aquafina and built from recycled cans

== List of special pavilions ==
Name	Image	Sub theme	area	architect	notes
Alif – The Mobility Pavilion		Mobility		Foster and Partners	Alif - The mobility pavilion had the largest passenger elevator in the world, capable of transporting more than 160 people at once.
Baden-Württemberg		Opportunity	2300 m²	NÜSSLI Adunic	Baden-Württemberg was the only federal state to have its own pavilion at the Expo. More than 70 tons of spruce wood from Baden-Württemberg were shipped to Dubai for the construction of the pavilion. Because sponsors withdrew their commitments and contracts were unclear, the federal state had to bear the costs itself and pay for a cost increase from three to more than 15 million Euros.
The Good Place		Opportunity		Ahmad Abdulrahman Bukhash	The pavilion showcased projects from Expo Live's Innovation Impact Grant program, which supported 140 grassroots innovators from 76 countries.
Mission Possible – The Opportunity Pavilion		Opportunity		AGi Architects	
Terra – The Sustainability Pavilion		Sustainability		Grimshaw Architects	
Vision Pavilion		Sustainability		Icaria Atelier	The Vision Pavilion celebrated the vision of Sheikh Muhammad bin Rashid Al Maktum, Vice President and Prime Minister of the UAE and Ruler of Dubai.
Women's Pavilion		Sustainability		e.construct	

== List of further attractions ==
Name	Image	Sub theme	architect	notes
Al Wasl Plaza			Adrian Smith + Gordon Gill Architecture	Central point of Expo 2020, dome over 60 meters high with a diameter of 150 meters, 360° projections were shown in the dome
Garden in the Sky		Jubilee		Observation tower
Water Feature		Jubilee		Music-controlled waterfalls
Sameem - Story of Our Culture		Sustainability		During the entire 6-month Expo period, visitors were able to experience the authentic construction of a dhow, a traditional wooden boat, live.
Entrance portals			Asif Khan	The three entrance portals to the districts, which were completed in December 2019, are made of high-quality carbon fibers and resins that have been processed into the finest strands and would stretch around the world 5000 times if laid end to end. Each portal has two 21-meter-high gates. The portals were manufactured by HA-CO Carbon GmbH (Wallerstein site in Germany).

== Special event ==
=== One national pavilion ===
Republic of China

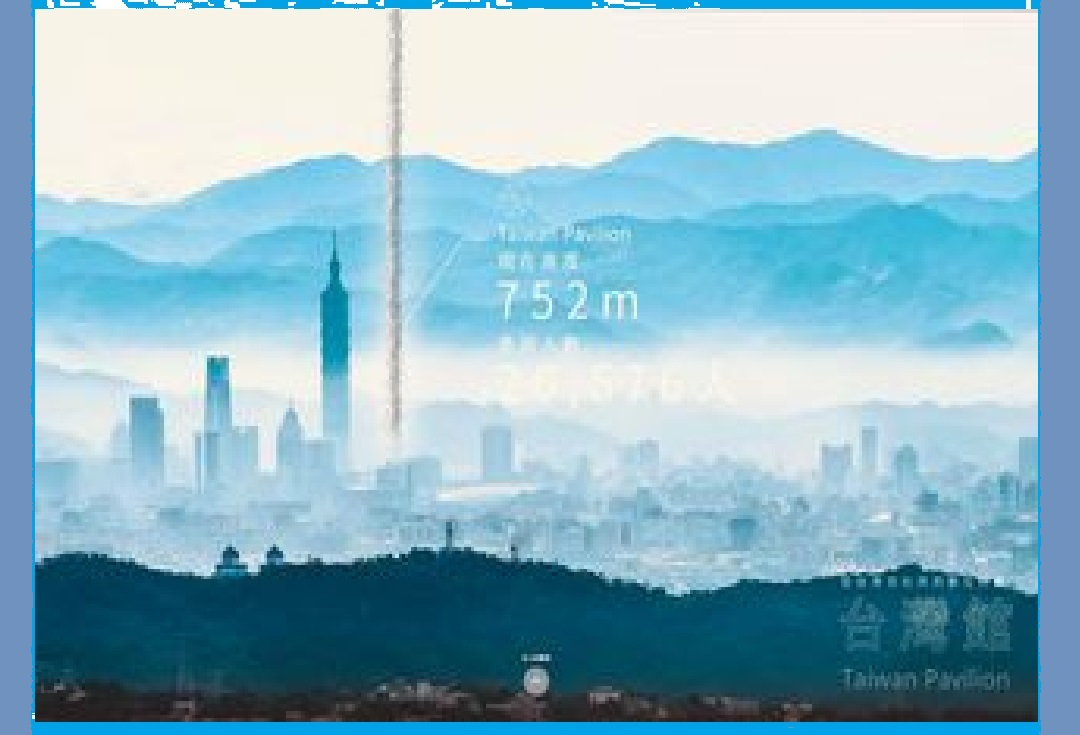
2020 Dubai Expo-Taiwan Pavilion
