= Sweden pavilion at Expo 2010 =

Pavilion in Shanghai

Coordinates: 31°11′04″N 121°28′36″E

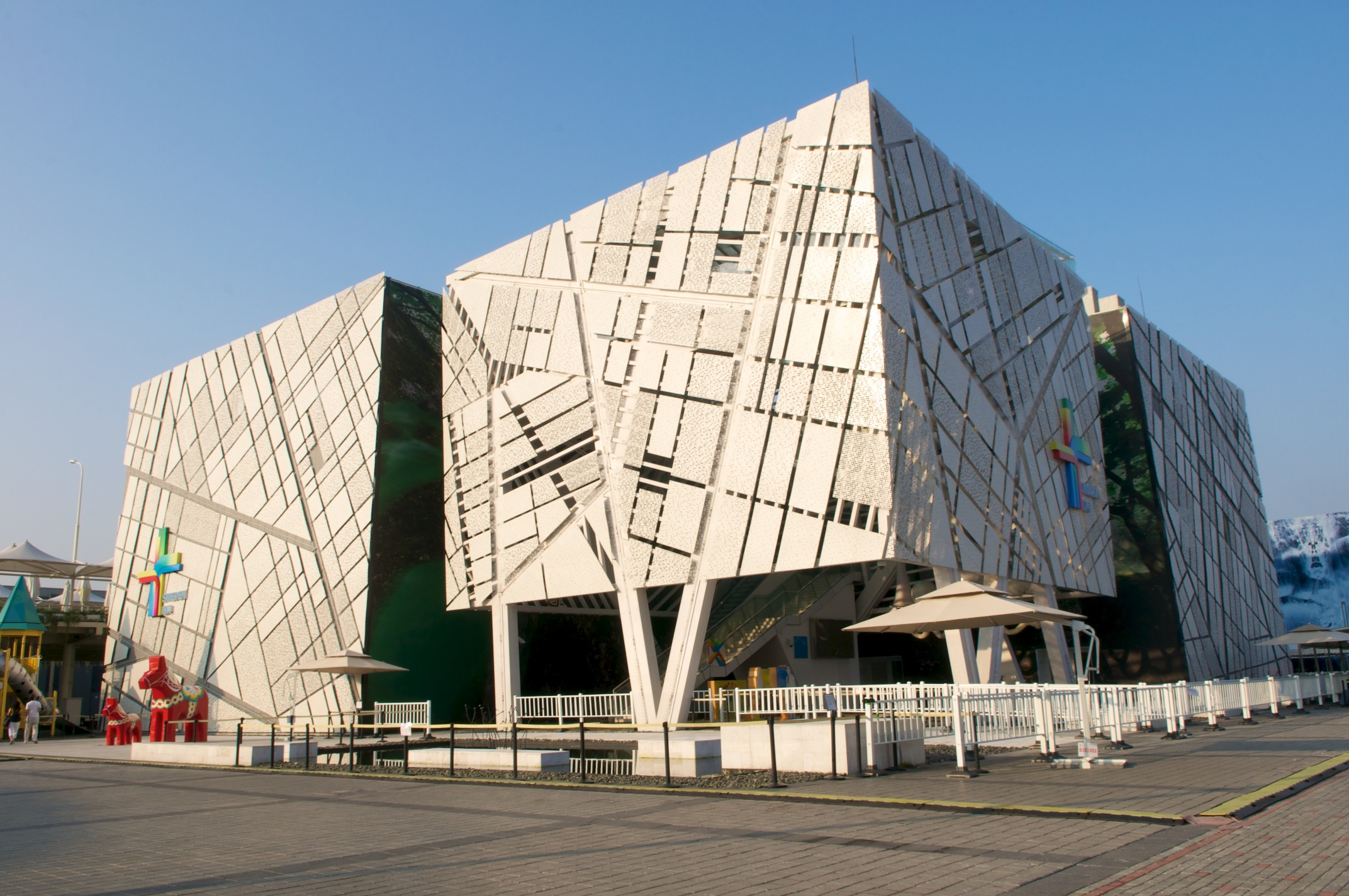
Sweden pavilion

The Sweden pavilion at the 2010 Shanghai Expo was situated in Zone C of the Pudong Expo site, surrounded by other Nordic and European country pavilions. The 3000 square-meter pavilion was designed by Swedish architectural firm Sweco according to the Swedish theme of “The Spirit of Innovation”. The total budget for the Swedish pavilion was around 150 million SEK, slightly more than half of which was contributed by the Swedish business sector. Commissioner General for the Swedish pavilion was Annika Rembe. Construction of the Swedish pavilion began on the April 20, 2009 and the pavilion was officially inaugurated on May 1, 2010, the day of the World Expo’s opening.

== Themes ==
The overall theme of the Swedish participation in the Shanghai Expo 2010 was “The Spirit of Innovation”. The architecture of the pavilion, the exhibition, and the activities hosted by the pavilion during the Expo were all grounded in this theme. With the official keywords sustainability, innovation and communication, this theme aimed to showcase Sweden as a nation of problem solvers, specifically in the sphere of urban environment and the quality of everyday life. According to General Commissioner Annika Rembe, the pavilion showed how Sweden has managed to develop so far, stressing Swedish ways of working, especially cooperation and a faith in creativity. One of the most important symbols for the Swedish pavilion was the cartoon character Pippi Longstocking. According to exhibition designer Carin Lembre, in order to be innovative like Alfred Nobel, you need to be creative like Pippi Longstocking. “The Spirit of Inspiration is created when, like Pippi, you dare to be brave, dare to try new ways of thinking and dare to make mistakes.”

== Architecture ==
The design of the pavilion was submitted by the Swedish architectural firm Sweco, under the supervision of chief architects Johannes Tüll and Christer Stenmark. It was a three-storey construction made up of four separate cube-like structures connected by elevated walkways. The first and second floors house the public exhibition, while the entire third floor was dedicated to conference areas and related facilities. A small café and a souvenir shop were located on the first floor. One of the most distinguishing design features was the laminated-wood outdoor atrium of the entrance hall, along with the roof-top glass-floor bar situated on top of it. The outside design combines an outer steel shell representing the street network of Stockholm with large panorama photography of Swedish forests on the inward-facing outer wall surfaces. This design was grounded in the concept of a meeting between city, nature and mankind.

== Exhibition ==
The Swedish exhibition was designed by communication and design agencies Springtime, Futurniture and Tengom architects as a walk through five halls of the Swedish pavilion, aimed to introduce the country of Sweden from the perspectives of sustainability and innovation. The entrance of the pavilion, the Swedish Atmosphere Hall, contained images of Swedish people and nature. The second exhibition hall, the Hall of Environmental Challenges, introduced some cases of environmental problems faced by Sweden and the solutions that had already been implemented towards them. The third hall, the Hall of Solutions, showed examples of products to be found in an ecologically sustainable city and a hands-on kitchen that demonstrates the contributions everyone can make to the environment. From this hall, one of the pavilion’s most popular attractions, a giant slide, led down to the Hall of Spirit of Innovation, where fifty Swedish inventions and designs were displayed on pictures. This hall also contains a number of swings that visitors could try, and aimed to deliver the message that true innovation comes from play. The last exhibition hall, the Innovative Society Hall, let visitors interact with machines and also featured the flexible space of the “Innovation Stage”, where activities and competitions were held at regular intervals.

== Visitors and activities ==
By mid-September, the Swedish pavilion had received over two million visitors. Except for the permanent exhibition, for the duration of the World Expo, several activities on sustainability and innovation were organized by the Swedish pavilion, including a SymbioCity forum, discussing the cities of the future, and a children’s literature seminar.

== Legacy ==
After the conclusion of the Expo, the Swedish Pavilion was disassembled and sold to the Chinese city of Tangshan, who repurposed it as a visitor center for the Caofeidian International Eco-City (Caofeidian Guoji Shengtaicheng 曹妃甸国际生态城). The now-empty plot in Shanghai has since become part of that city's Expo Park.
