= Grand Ring =

Round wooden structure at Expo 2025

Coordinates: 34°38′56″N 135°22′48″E

The Grand Ring
- 大屋根リング
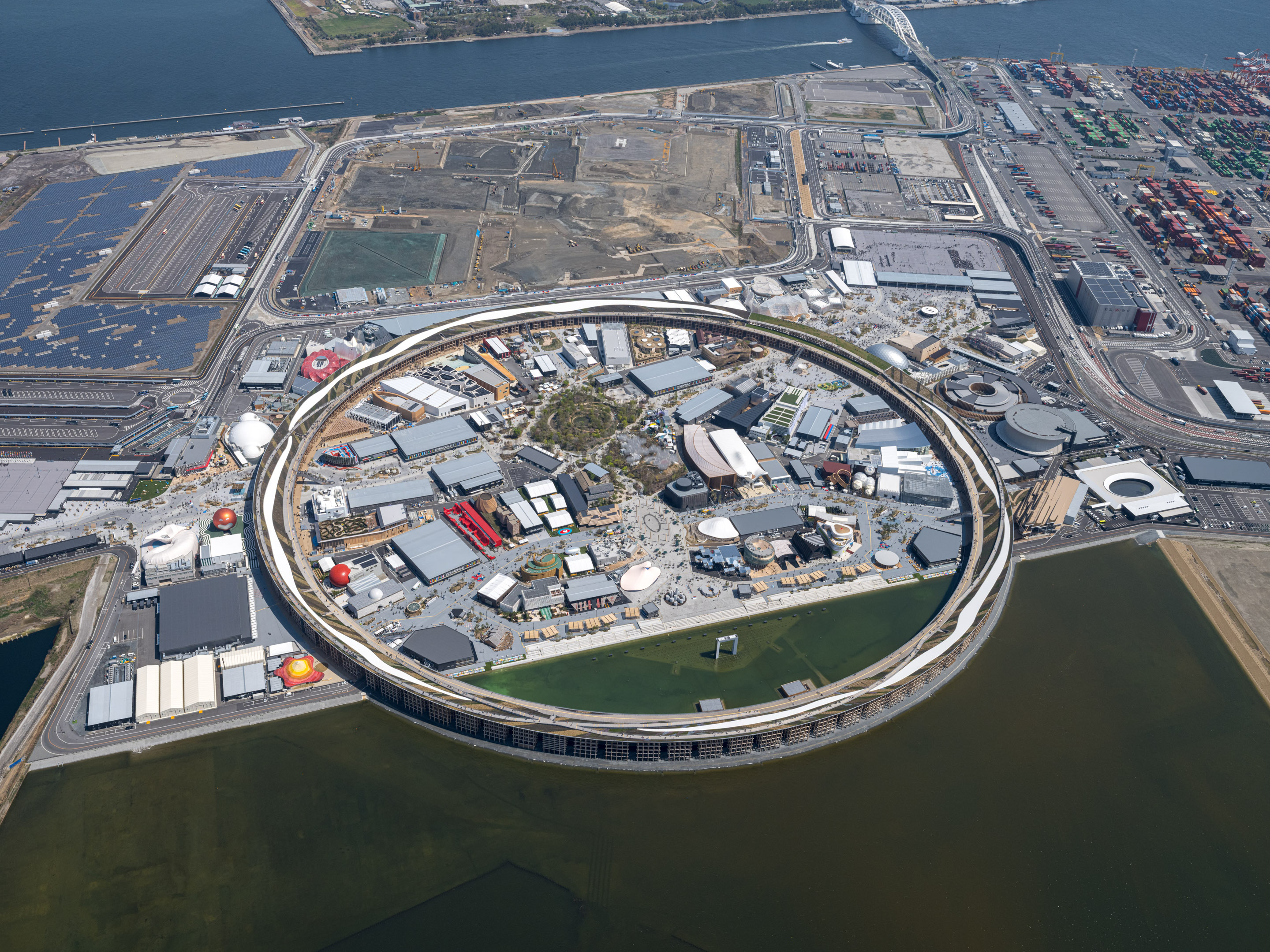
- The Grand Ring in April 2025
- Interactive map of the The Grand Ring area

General information
- Status: Completed
- Location: Yumeshima, Osaka, Japan, Japan
- Year built: 2023–2025

Height
- Height: 20 metres (66 ft)

Technical details
- Floor area: 61,035.55 square metres (657,000 sq ft)

The Grand Ring was a building designed by Sou Fujimoto for Expo 2025 in Osaka, Japan. Built using traditional wooden joinery, it covered an area of 61,035 square metres (656,980 sq ft), making it the largest wooden architectural structure on earth according to the Guinness Book of World Records.

As the name suggests, it was a large wooden ring covering 61,035 square metres. The Nuki technique was used for wooden joinery, along with modern building technologies. About 70% of the wood used in the ring was Japanese Cryptomeria and Chamaecyparis obtusa, while the other 30% was imported Pinus sylvestris. The top of the structure featured a 2,025 meter long "Skywalk", accessible via five escalators and six elevators. According to the Guinness World Records, the Grand Ring was the largest wooden architectural structure on earth.

The ring was originally planned to be demolished after the end of the Expo 2025, with wooden materials re-used in the future. However, private sectors have proposed preserving 200 meters of the northern ring to preserve as a landmark, while Hirofumi Yoshimura, the governor of the Osaka Prefecture, proposed preserving 600 meters of the southern part of the ring. In October 2025, Ishikawa Prefecture officials proposed using some parts of the Grand Ring to rebuild damaged houses in Suzu. Fujimoto said in December that most of the Grand Ring would be dismantled and burned as fuel.
