= Garden festival =

Festival and exposition to celebrate gardening and gardens

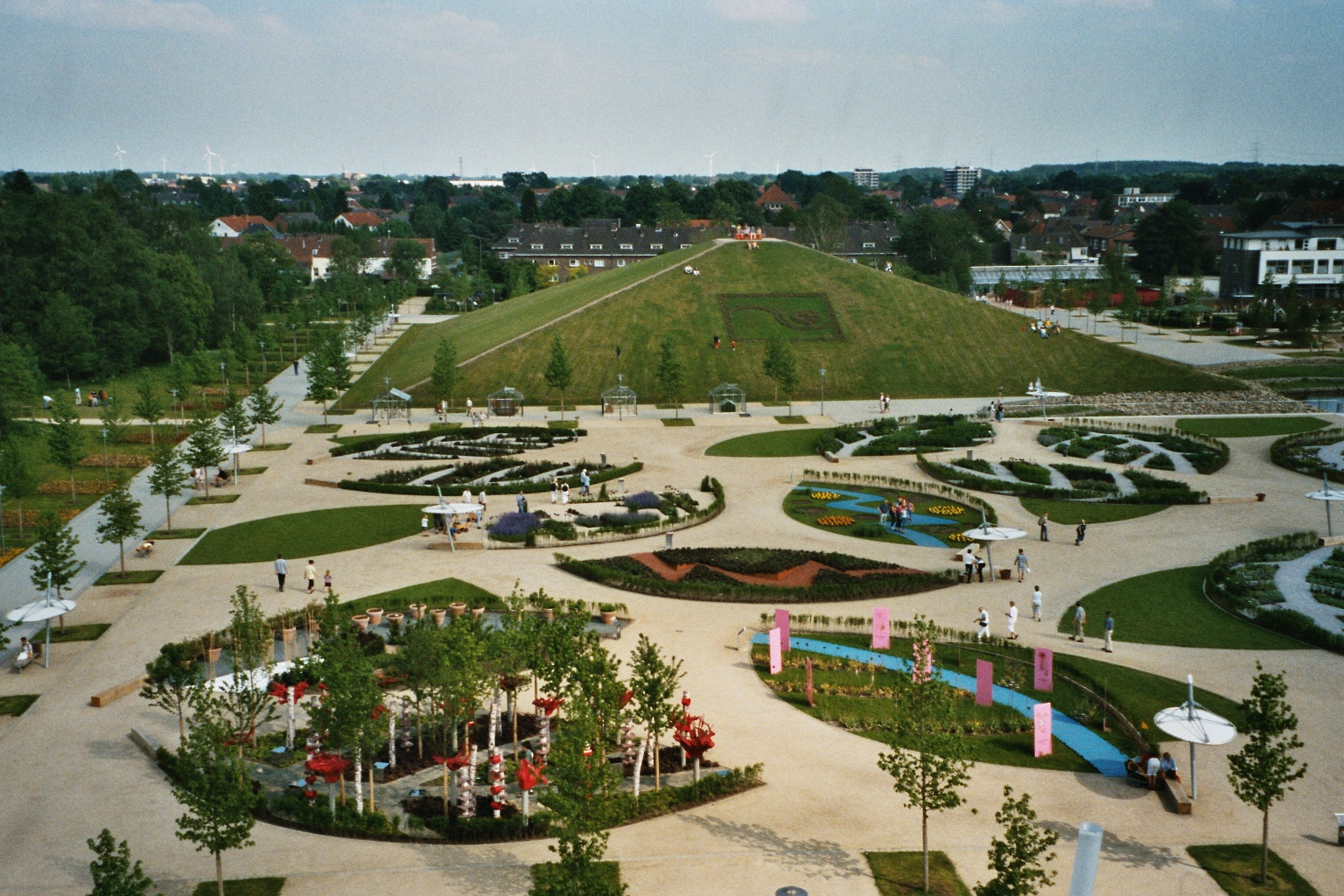
Landesgartenschau Gronau 2003

A garden festival is a festival and exposition held to celebrate the arts of gardening, garden design, landscaping and landscape architecture. There are local garden festivals, regional garden festivals, national garden festivals and international garden festivals. The idea probably originated with Germany's Bundesgartenschau. The UK held five garden festivals in the period 1984–1992.

To qualify as an international exhibition, an expo must be recognised by the Bureau International des Expositions (BIE), which was established by a diplomatic international convention, signed in Paris, in 1928. Horticultural expos can also be recognised by the International Association of Horticultural Producers (IAHP / AIPH). To qualify as a national exhibition, a garden festival must be recognised by a national government.

Because garden design is becoming more popular and featuring on TV, there is an ever-growing number of garden festivals: permanent and temporary, official and non-official. One of the best known is the International Garden Festival held on a permanent site at Chaumont in France. Despite the name, Chaumont does not come within the BIE definition of an 'international' festival. Other shows feature garden design but describe themselves as 'flower shows'. The best-known example in this category, the Chelsea Flower Show, emphasises garden design. It spun off a Chelsea Fringe events in 2012 which featured a variety of unusual gardens and gardening across London.

== List of International Garden Festivals (BIE recognised) ==
Country	City	Name	Year	Theme	BIE recognised
Japan	Yokohama	World Horticultural Exhibition YOKOHAMA 2027	2027	Scenery of the Future for Happiness	Yes
Germany	Ruhr Region from Dortmund to Duisburg	Green Ruhr 2027	2027	Stadt der Städte	Yes
Thailand	Udon Thani	Udon Thani International Horticultural Expo 2026	2026	Diversity of Life	Yes
Qatar	Doha	Qatar Expo 2021	2023	Green Desert, Better Environment	Yes
Netherlands	Amsterdam-Almere	Floriade Amsterdam-Almere 2022	2022	Growing Green Cities	Yes
China	Beijing	Expo 2019 Beijing China	2019	Live Green, Live Better	Yes
Turkey	Antalya	Expo 2016 Antalya	2016	Flowers and Children	Yes
Netherlands	Venlo	Floriade 2012 Venlo	2012	Be part of the theatre in nature; get closer to the quality of life	Yes
Thailand	Chiang Mai	International Horticultural Exposition Royal Flora Ratchaphruek 2006	2006	To Express the Love for Humanity	Yes
Germany	Rostock	IGA Rostock 2003 – Internationale Gartenbauausstellung 2003 Hansestadt Rostock	2003	A Seaside Park. A new flowered world	Yes
Netherlands	Haarlemmermeer	Floriade 2002	2002	The contribution of the Netherlands horticulture and international horticulture in the quality of life in the 21st century	Yes
China	Kunming	International Horticultural Exhibition Kunming 1999	1999	Man and Nature - Marching into the 21st century	Yes
Germany	Stuttgart	IGA Stuttgart 93 – V Internationale Gartenbauausstellung	1993	City and Nature - Responsible Approach	Yes
Netherlands	Zoetermeer	Floriade The Hague-Zoetermeer 1992	1992	Horticulture is being involved in a continuous process of renewal in the field of quality, technique, science and management	Yes
Japan	Osaka	International Garden and Greenery Exposition, Osaka, Japan 1990	1990	The Harmonious Coexistence of Nature and Mankind	Yes
Great Britain	Liverpool	International Garden Festival Liverpool '84	1984	The progress accomplished by International and National Horticulture	Yes
Germany	Munich	IGA 83 München – IV Internationale Gartenbauausstellung	1983	International Horticulture	Yes
Netherlands	Amsterdam	Floriade Amsterdam 1982	1982	International Horticulture	Yes
Canada	Montreal	Floralies Internationales de Montréal	1980	Relationship between man's socio-cultural activities and his physical environment	Yes
Austria	Vienna	WIG 74 – Wiener Internationale Gartenschau 1974	1974	International Horticulture	Yes
Germany	Hamburg	Internationale Gartenbauausstellung 73	1973	International Horticulture	Yes
Netherlands	Amsterdam	Floriade Amsterdam 1972	1972	Efforts accomplished by International Horticulture	Yes
France	Paris	Floralies Internationales Paris 1969	1969	Flowers of France and Flowers of the World	Yes
Austria	Vienna	WIG 64 – Wiener Internationale Gartenschau	1964	International Horticulture	Yes
Germany	Hamburg	IGA 63 – Internationale Gartenbauausstellung Hamburg 1963	1963	Horticulture of all Categories from the Point of View of Economics and Culture	Yes
Netherlands	Rotterdam	Floriade International Horticultural Exhibition 1960	1960	International Horticulture	Yes

=== List of other garden festivals ===
Country	City	Festival name	Year(s)	Dates	Type	AIPH classification	BIE recognised
United Kingdom	Stoke-on-Trent, England	Stoke-on-Trent Garden Festival	1986	1 May – 26 October	National		No
United Kingdom	Glasgow, Scotland	Glasgow Garden Festival	1988	28 April – 26 September	National		No
United Kingdom	Gateshead, England	Gateshead Garden Festival	1990	1 May – 4 October	National		No
United Kingdom	Ebbw Vale, Wales	Ebbw Vale Garden Festival	1992	1 May – 4 October	National		No
United States	Columbus, Ohio	AmeriFlora '92	1992	3 April – 12 October	International		No
France	Dijon	Florissimo	2005, 2010, 2015		National	B2	No
Brazil	Festival de Holambra	ExpoFlora	2005		National	B2	No
China	Shenyang	International Horticultural Exposition 2006	2006	1 May – 31 October	International	A2/B1	No
Singapore	Singapore	Singapore Garden Festival	2006 and biennially since	16–25 December	International	n/a	No
Myanmar	Pyin Oo Lwin	National Kandawgyi Gardens	2005–2017	December	National	N/A	No
France	Dijon	Florissimo	2010	11–21 March	National		No
Republic of China	Taipei	Taipei International Flora Exposition	2010–2011	6 November – 25 April	International	A2/B1	No
Australia	Melbourne	Melbourne International Flower and Garden Show	1995—	30 March – 3 April	International	n/a	No
China	Xi'an	International Horticultural Exposition 2011	2011	22 April – 28 October	International	A2/B1	No
South Korea	Suncheon	Suncheon International Garden Expo(Korea)	2013	20 April – 20 October	International	A2/B1	No
China	Jinzhou	International Horticultural Exposition 2013	2013	10 May – 31 October	International	A2/B1	No
China	Qingdao	Qingdao International Horticultural Exposition 2014	2014	25 April – 25 October	International	A2/B1	No
France	Dijon	Florissimo	2015	March	National		No
China	Tangshan	Tangshan International Horticultural Exposition 2016	2016	May – Oct	International	A2/B1	No
Republic of China	Taichung	2018 Taichung World Flora Exposition	2018	3 Nov. 2018 – 24 Apr. 2019	International	A2/B1	No
Australia	Canberra	Floriade, Canberra	1988—	16 September — 15 October 2023	National		No
China	Yangzhou	Yangzhou International Horticultural Exposition 2021	2021	8 April – 8 October	International	A2/B1	No
