= Bundesgartenschau =

Biennial federal horticulture show in Germany

The Bundesgartenschau (German pronunciation: [ˌbʊndəsˈɡaʁtn̩ʃaʊ̯]; abbr. BUGA) is a biennial federal horticulture show in Germany. It also covers topics like landscaping. Taking place in different cities, the location changes in a two-year cycle. About once every ten years, an international horticulture exposition (Internationale Gartenbauausstellung; abbr. IGA) is held instead.

== BUGA cities ==
- 1951 – Hanover
- 1953 – Hamburg (Planten un Blomen) (IGA)
- 1955 – Kassel
- 1957 – Cologne (Rheinpark)
- 1959 – Dortmund
- 1961 – Stuttgart
- 1963 – Hamburg (IGA)
- 1965 – Essen
- 1967 – Karlsruhe
- 1969 – Dortmund
- 1971 – Cologne (Rheinpark)
- 1973 – Hamburg (IGA)
- 1975 – Mannheim
- 1977 – Stuttgart
- 1979 – Bonn
- 1981 – Kassel
- 1983 – München (IGA)
- 1985 – Berlin
- 1987 – Düsseldorf
- 1989 – Frankfurt am Main
- 1991 – Dortmund
- 1993 – Stuttgart (IGA)
- 1995 – Cottbus
- 1997 – Gelsenkirchen
- 1999 – Magdeburg
- 2001 – Potsdam
- 2003 – Rostock (IGA)
- 2005 – München
- 2007 – Gera and Ronneburg (Thüringen)
- 2009 – Schwerin
- 2011 – Koblenz
- 2013 – Hamburg (IGA)
- 2015 – Lower Havel Region
- 2017 – Berlin (Marzahn Park) (IGA)
- 2019 – Heilbronn
- 2021 – Erfurt
- 2023 – Mannheim
- 2025 – Rostock (cancelled)
- 2027 – Ruhr Region (IGA)
- 2029 – Upper Middle Rhine
- 2031 – Wuppertal
- 2033 – Dresden
- 2035 – Dessau-Roßlau
