= International Association of Horticultural Producers =

Organization to promote horticultural producers

International Association of Horticultural Producers Association Internationale des Producteurs de l'Horticulture
- Formation: 1948; 78 years ago
- Type: Trade association
- Headquarters: Oxfordshire, United Kingdom
- Members: 34 members
- President: Leonardo Capitanio
- Vice president: Holly Peng
- Secretary general: Tim Briercliffe
- Website: www.aiph.org

The International Association of Horticultural Producers (French: Association Internationale des Producteurs de l'Horticulture; AIPH) is an international trade association dedicated to supporting horticultural producers and promoting the industry globally. It is the primary body responsible for approving and overseeing international horticultural exhibitions.

== History ==
The AIPH was founded in 1948 in Zurich, Switzerland. It was established by representatives from Western European grower associations who sought to mend international relations and rebuild the horticultural community following the devastation of the World War II. Since its inception, the organization has evolved from a regional initiative into a prominent international body.

== Mission ==
The association’s core mission is to reignite and uphold a global appreciation for plants, which it defines as a fundamental human instinct. AIPH operates under the belief that modern urbanization and technology have detached humanity from the natural world, leading to unnatural lives. To counteract this, the organization strives to achieve a "healthy and stable equilibrium" between: Humanity, Technology, Nature.

== Horticultural exposition ==
AIPH holds the international mandate for approving and regulating major horticultural exhibitions, a responsibility governed by an international convention to ensure the highest global standards. Since 1960, in partnership with the Bureau International des Expositions (BIE), AIPH has overseen and supported over 50 World Horticultural Expos. These events serve as world-class spectacles that attract millions of visitors, providing a global platform to showcase horticultural products to the public, businesses, and governments. Beyond their scale as major attractions, a primary objective of these sanctioned expos is to create green legacies, ensuring that host cities benefit from permanent urban parklands and environmental improvements that sustain the community long after the events have concluded.

=== Categories ===
AIPH recognises four different categories of horticultural exposition, with the following table summarising the main differences between each of them.

| Categories | Official name | Duration | Minimum area (ha) | Application |
|---|---|---|---|---|
| A1 | International Horticultural Expos | 3 – 6 months | 50 | 12 – 6 years before (BIE recognition required) |
| B | International Green Expos | 3 – 6 months | 25 | 10 – 3 years before |
| C | International Horticultural Shows | 4 – 20 days | 0.6 | 5 – 0.5 years before |
| D | International Horticultural Trade Shows | No requirement | | 5 – 0.5 years before |

=== International Horticultural Expos ===
The following is a list of International Horticultural Expos classified as Category A1 by the AIPH.

| Year | Location | Dates | Area (ha) | Visitors | Participants | Theme |
|---|---|---|---|---|---|---|
| 1960 | Rotterdam, Netherlands | 25 March – 25 September 1960 | 50 | 4,000,000 | N/A | International Horticulture |
| 1963 | Hamburg, West Germany | 26 April – 13 October 1963 | 76 | 5,400,000 | 35 | Horticulture of all Categories from the Point of View of Economics and Culture |
| 1964 | Vienna, Austria | 16 April – 11 October 1964 | 100 | 2,100,000 | 28 | International Horticulture |
| 1969 | Paris, France | 23 April – 5 October 1969 | 28 | 2,400,000 | 17 | Flowers of France and Flowers of the World |
| 1972 | Amsterdam, Netherlands | 26 March – 1 October 1972 | 75 | 4,300,000 | N/A | Efforts accomplished by International Horticulture |
| 1973 | Hamburg, West Germany | 27 April – 7 October 1973 | 76 | 5,800,000 | 50 | International Horticulture |
| 1974 | Vienna, Austria | 18 April – 14 October 1974 | 100 | 2,600,000 | 30 | International Horticulture |
| 1980 | Montreal, Canada | 17 May – 1 September 1980 | 40 | N/A | 23 | Relationship between man's socio-cultural activities and his physical environment |
| 1982 | Amsterdam, Netherlands | 8 April – 10 October 1982 | 50 | 4,600,000 | 17 | International Horticulture |
| 1983 | Munich, West Germany | 28 April – 9 October 1983 | 72 | 11,600,000 | 23 | International Horticulture |
| 1984 | Liverpool, United Kingdom | 2 May – 14 October 1984 | 95 | 3,380,000 | 29 | The progress accomplished by International and National Horticulture |
| 1990 | Osaka, Japan | 1 April – 30 September 1990 | 140 | 23,126,934 | 83 | The Harmonious Coexistence of Nature and Mankind |
| 1992 | Zoetermeer, Netherlands | 10 April – 12 October 1992 | 68 | 3,355,600 | 23 | Horticulture is being involved in a continuous process of renewal |
| 1993 | Stuttgart, Germany | 23 April – 17 October 1993 | 64 | 7,311,000 | 40 | City and Nature – Responsible Approach |
| 1999 | Kunming, China | 1 May – 31 October 1999 | 218 | 9,427,000 | 70 | Man and Nature – Marching into the 21st century |
| 2002 | Haarlemmermeer, Netherlands | 25 April – 20 October 2002 | 140 | 2,071,000 | 30 | The contribution of the Netherlands horticulture and international horticulture |
| 2003 | Rostock, Germany | 25 April – 12 October 2003 | 100 | 2,600,000 | 32 | A Seaside Park. A new flowered world |
| 2006 | Chiang Mai, Thailand | 1 November 2006 – 31 January 2007 | 80 | 3,848,791 | 32 | To Express the Love for Humanity |
| 2012 | Venlo, Netherlands | 5 April – 7 October 2012 | 66 | 2,046,684 | 38 | Be part of the theatre in nature; get closer to the quality of life |
| 2016 | Antalya, Turkey | 23 April – 30 October 2016 | 112 | 4,693,571 | 54 | Flowers and Children |
| 2019 | Beijing, China | 29 April – 7 October 2019 | 503 | 9,340,000 | 110 | Live Green, Live Better |
| 2022 | Almere, Netherlands | 14 April – 9 October 2022 | 60 | 685,189 | 32 | Growing Green Cities |
| 2023 | Doha, Qatar | 2 October 2023 – 28 March 2024 | 80 | N/A | N/A | Green Desert, Better Environment |
| 2027 | Yokohama, Japan | 19 March – 26 September 2027 | 80 | | | Scenery of the Future for Happiness |
| 2029 | Nakhon Ratchasima, Thailand | 10 November 2029 – 28 February 2030 | 109 | | | Nature and Greenery: Envisioning the Green Future |
| 2031 | Minnesota, United States | 1 May – 15 October 2031 | 90.6 | | | Human/Nature: Where Humanity and Horticulture Meet |

=== International Green Expos ===
The following is a list of International Green Expos classified as Category B by the AIPH.

| Year | Location | Dates | Area (ha) | Visitors | Participants | Theme |
|---|---|---|---|---|---|---|
| 2004 | Hamamatsu, Japan | 8 April – 11 October 2004 | 56 | 5,440,000 | N/A | Flowers, Greenery, Water: Creating New Style of Living |
| 2006 | Shenyang, China | 1 May – 31 October 2006 | 246 | 3,500,000 | 25 | Man and nature, we live harmoniously |
| 2010 | Taipei, Taiwan | 6 November 2010 – 25 April 2011 | 91.8 | 8,900,000 | 30 | River, Flower, New Horizon |
| 2011 | Xi'an, China | 28 April – 22 October 2011 | 418 | 12,000,000 | 28 | Nature and People in One in Chang’an, Nature Creativity |
| 2011 | Chiang Mai, Thailand | 14 December 2011 – 14 March 2012 | 80 | 2,200,000 | 31 | Greenitude: Reducing Global Warming to Save Planet Earth and to Improve the Quality of Life |
| 2013 | Suncheon, South Korea | 20 April – 20 October 2013 | 111.2 | 2,000,000 | 23 | Garden of the Earth |
| 2014 | Qingdao, China | 25 April – 25 October 2014 | 241 | 12,600,000 | 37 | From the Earth, for the Earth |
| 2016 | Tangshan, China | 29 April – 16 October 2016 | 540 | 5,200,000 | 15 | City and Nature, Phoenix Nirvana |
| 2018 | Taichung, Taiwan | 3 November 2018 – 24 April 2019 | 60.88 | 7,240,000 | 26 | Rediscover A Green, Nature and People |
| 2021 | Yangzhou, China | 8 April – 8 October 2021 | 230 | 1,600,000 | 15 | Green City, Healthy Life |
| 2021 | Hatay, Turkey | 1 April – 20 June 2020 | 32 | 1,083,568 | 10 | Garden of Civilisations |
| 2023 | Suncheon, South Korea | 1 April – 31 October 2023 | 193 | 9,812,157 | 30 | We Live In The Garden |
| 2023 | Kahramanmaraş, Turkey | 23 April – 30 October 2023 | 78 | 2,000,000 | 22 | Nature Friendly City and Sensitivity |
| 2024 | Chengdu, China | 26 April – 28 October 2024 | 242 | 10,230,000 | 23 | Park City, Beautiful Habitat |
| 2026 | Udon Thani, Thailand | 1 November 2026 – 14 March 2027 | 165 | | | Diversity of Life: Connecting People, Water, and Plants for Sustainable Living |
| 2028 | Ulsan, South Korea | 22 April – 28 October 2028 | 124 | | | Garden, the Cradle of the Earth |
| 2029 | Baghdad, Iraq | 1 October 2029 – 1 April 2030 | 375 | | | Green Light in Desert |

== Member organisations ==
AIPH is currently composed of representative grower organizations from 33 member states across the globe, prioritizing the professional interests of horticultural producers through a non-governmental framework that fosters international cooperation, technical exchange, and the official sanctioning of horticultural exhibitions.

- Australia (Greenlife Industry Australia)
- Belgium (Sierteelt- En Groenfederatie)
- Bhutan (Horticulture Association of Bhutan)
- Brazil (Cooperative Veiling Holambra)
- Canada
  - Canadian Nursery Landscape Association
  - Canadian Ornamental Horticulture Alliance
  - Flowers Canada Growers Inc
  - Québec Vert
- China (China Flower Association)
- Chinese Taipei (Taiwan Floriculture Development Association)
- Colombia (Asocolflores)
- Costa Rica (Chamber of Plants, Flowers, and Foliage of Costa Rica)
- Denmark (Dansk Gartneri)
- Finland (Kauppapuutarhaliitto Ry)
- Germany
  - Bund Deutscher Baumschulen e.V.
  - Zentralverband Gartenbau e.V.
- Greece (Hellenic Plant Material Exporters and Importers Association)
- Hungary (Hungarian Interbranch Organization for Ornamental Horticulture)
- India (Growers’ Flower Council of India)
- Indonesia (Asosiasi Bunga Indonesia)
- Ireland (Irish Hardy Nursery Stock Association)
- Italy (Associazione Nazionale Vivaisti Esportatori)
- Japan (Japan Landscape Contractors Association)
- Kenya (Kenya Flower Council)
- Netherlands (Vereniging van Bloemenveilingen in Nederland)
- Pakistan (Horticultural Society of Pakistan)
- Poland (Polish Nurserymen Association)
- Qatar (Ministry of Municipality)
- South Korea
  - Korean Association for the Advancement of the Flora Culture
  - Korea Flower Cultivate Association
- Spain (Asociacion de Comercializadores de Planta Ornamental)
- Sweden (LRF Trädgård)
- Switzerland (JardinSuisse)
- Thailand (Department of Agriculture)
- Turkey (Ornamental Plants and Products Exporters Association)
- United Kingdom (Horticultural Trades Association)
- United States (American Hort)
- Vietnam (Vietnam Ornamental Creature Association)
