= Floriade 1982 =

Garden festival in Amsterdam, Netherlands

EXPO 1982 Amsterdam
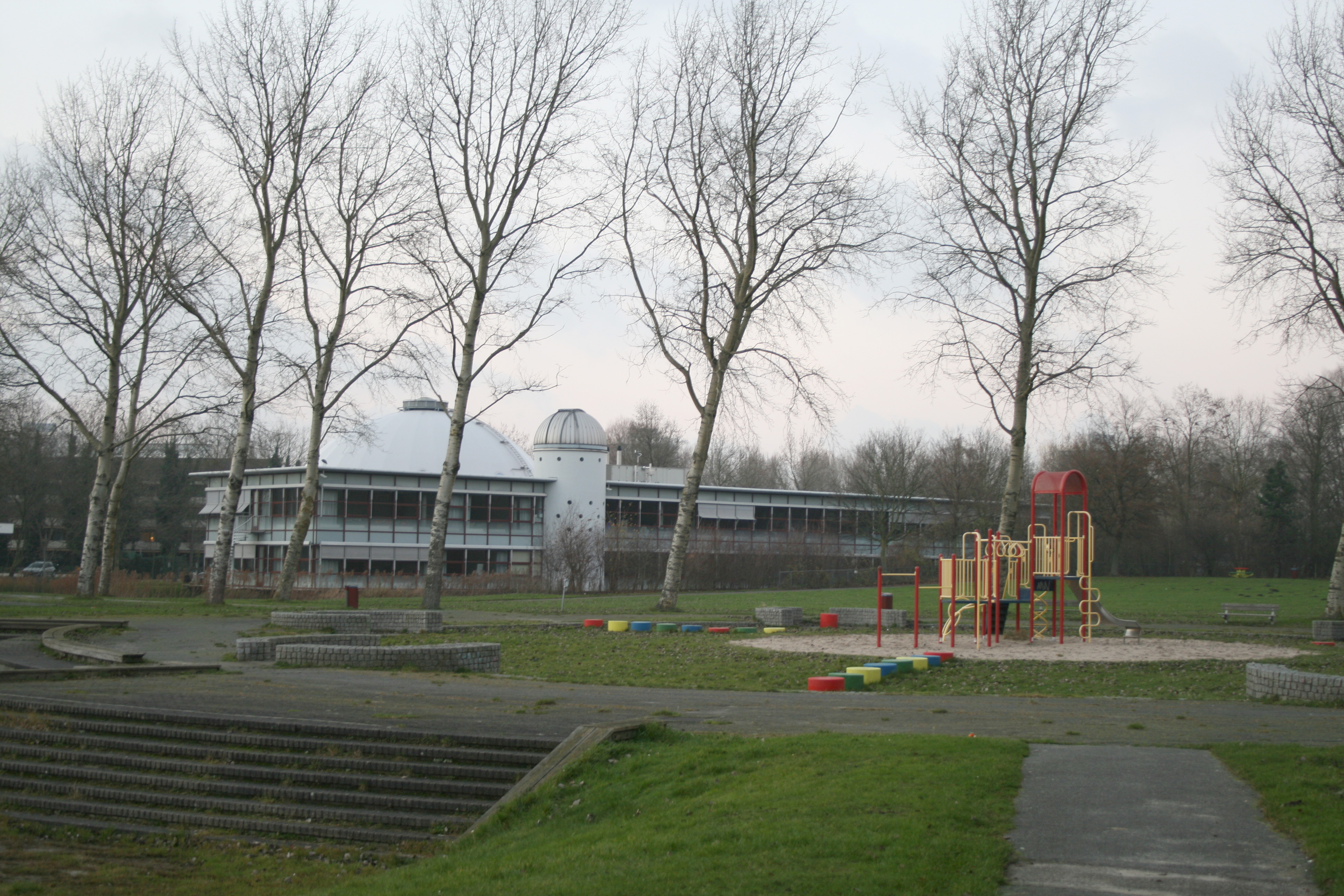
- The planetarium at Gaasperpark

Overview
- BIE-class: Horticultural exposition
- Name: Floriade 1982

Location
- Country: Netherlands
- City: Amsterdam
- Venue: Gaasperpark

Timeline
- Opening: April 8, 1982
- Closure: October 10, 1982

Horticultural expositions
- Previous: Montreal 1980 in Montreal
- Next: International Garden Expo 83 in Munich

Floriade 1982 was a garden festival held in Amsterdam, Netherlands. The second Amsterdam Floriade was recognised by the Bureau International des Expositions (BIE) and held from April 8 to October 10, 1982. It was the 9th edition of the international horticultural exposition organised under the auspices of the Association of International Horticultural Producers (AIPH) and the third held in the Netherlands. Floriade 1982 was held at a recreation area surrounding the Gaasperplas lake in the neighborhood of Gaasperdam. The entrance to the Floriade was near the previously constructed Gaasperplas metro station.

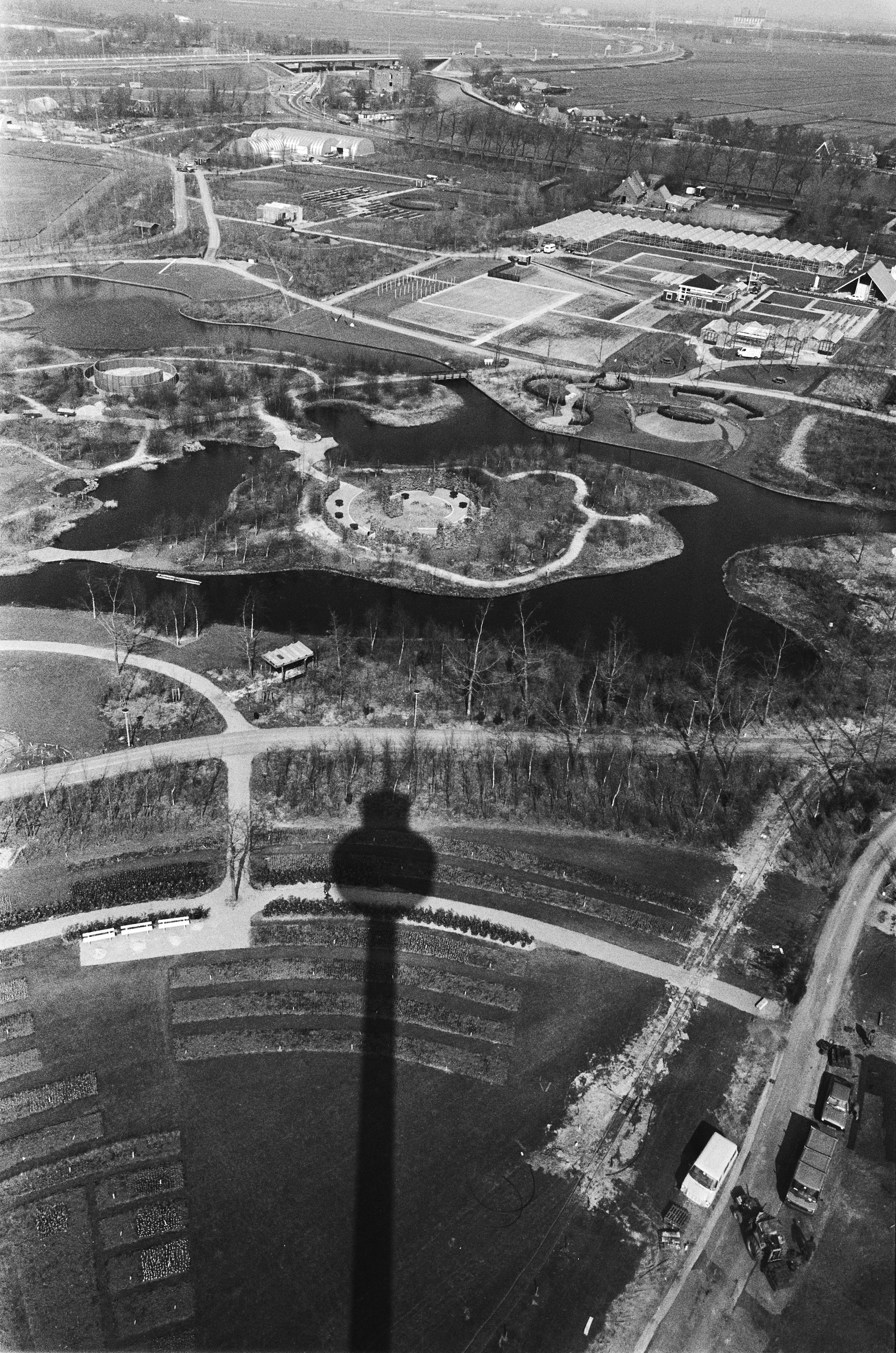
View from the observation tower

What remained after the Floriade, after some of the structures were removed, became the Gaasperpark. The planetarium today houses a conference and meeting center. The interior furnishings of the planetarium were moved in 1988 to the Artis Planetarium.

The 76m observation tower was an attraction on the Floriade 1982. It was previously used for the bi-annual Kassel Bundesgartenschau in Germany in 1981 and before that the Münchenstein Grün 80. In 1983 the attraction returned to Germany and opened in Europa-Park, where it is still operational.
