= Florissimo =

French flower show

Coordinates: 47°20′N 5°03′E

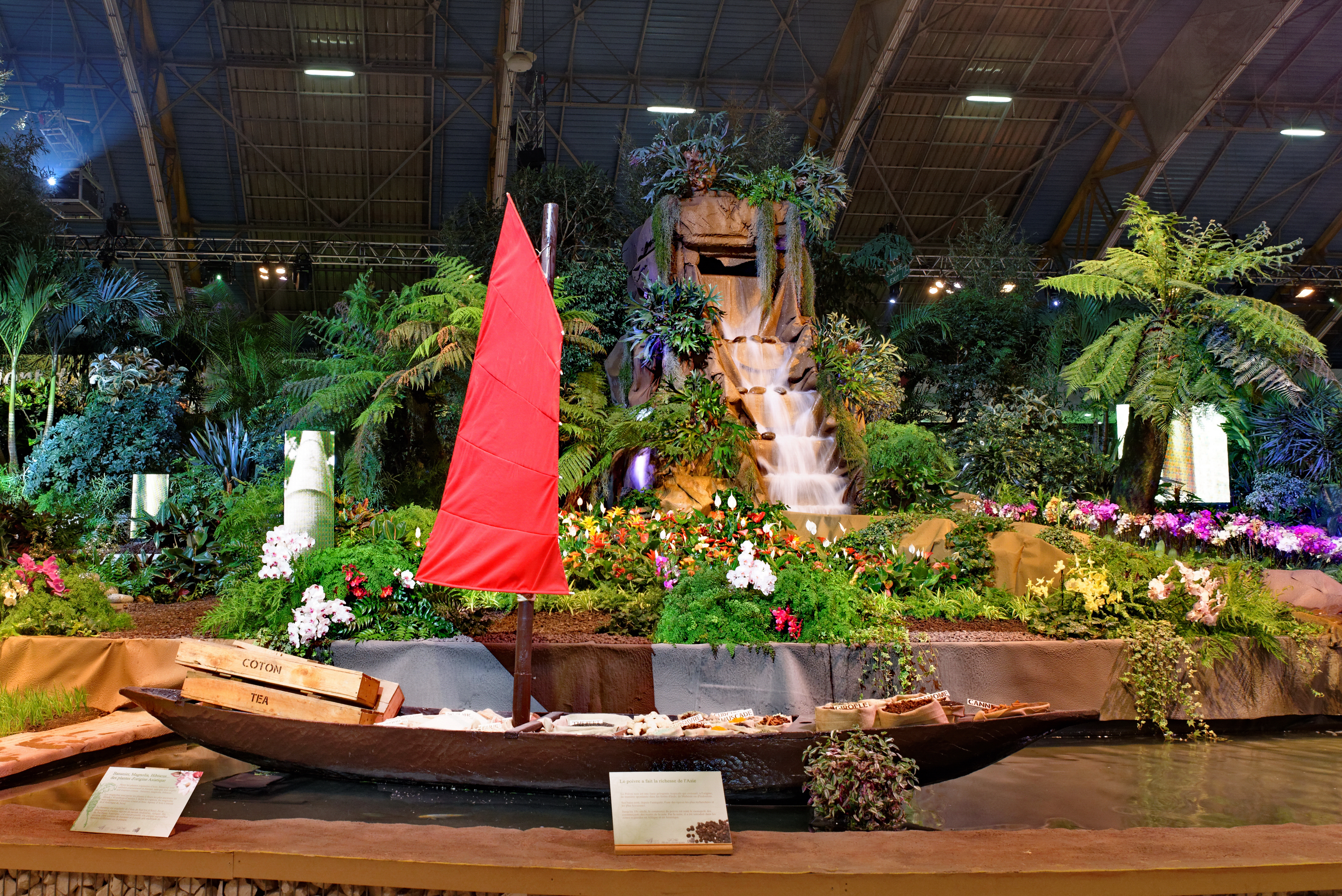
Florissimo Exhibition, 2015 (Dijon, France)

Florissimo is an international flower show held in the city of Dijon, France. It features exhibits from French and non-French cities, botanical gardens, agricultural schools, and private corporations.

Florissimo is normally held every three years (though the 2003 issue was postponed to 2005 (and then recognised by the AIPH) in order to coincide with an event on orchids). The latest event was held between 11 and 21 March 2010 and the next will be in March 2015.

== Florissimo 2010 ==
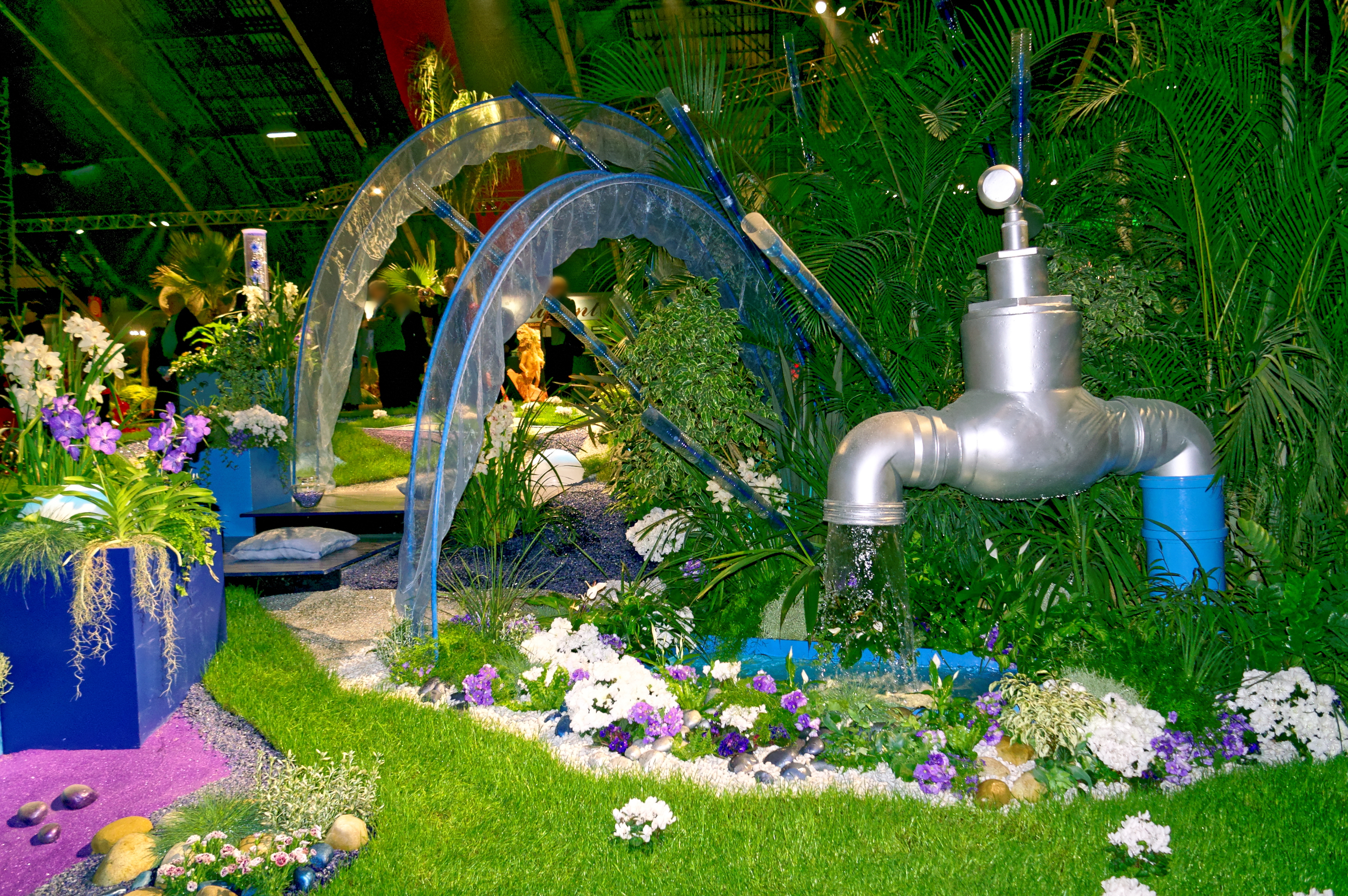

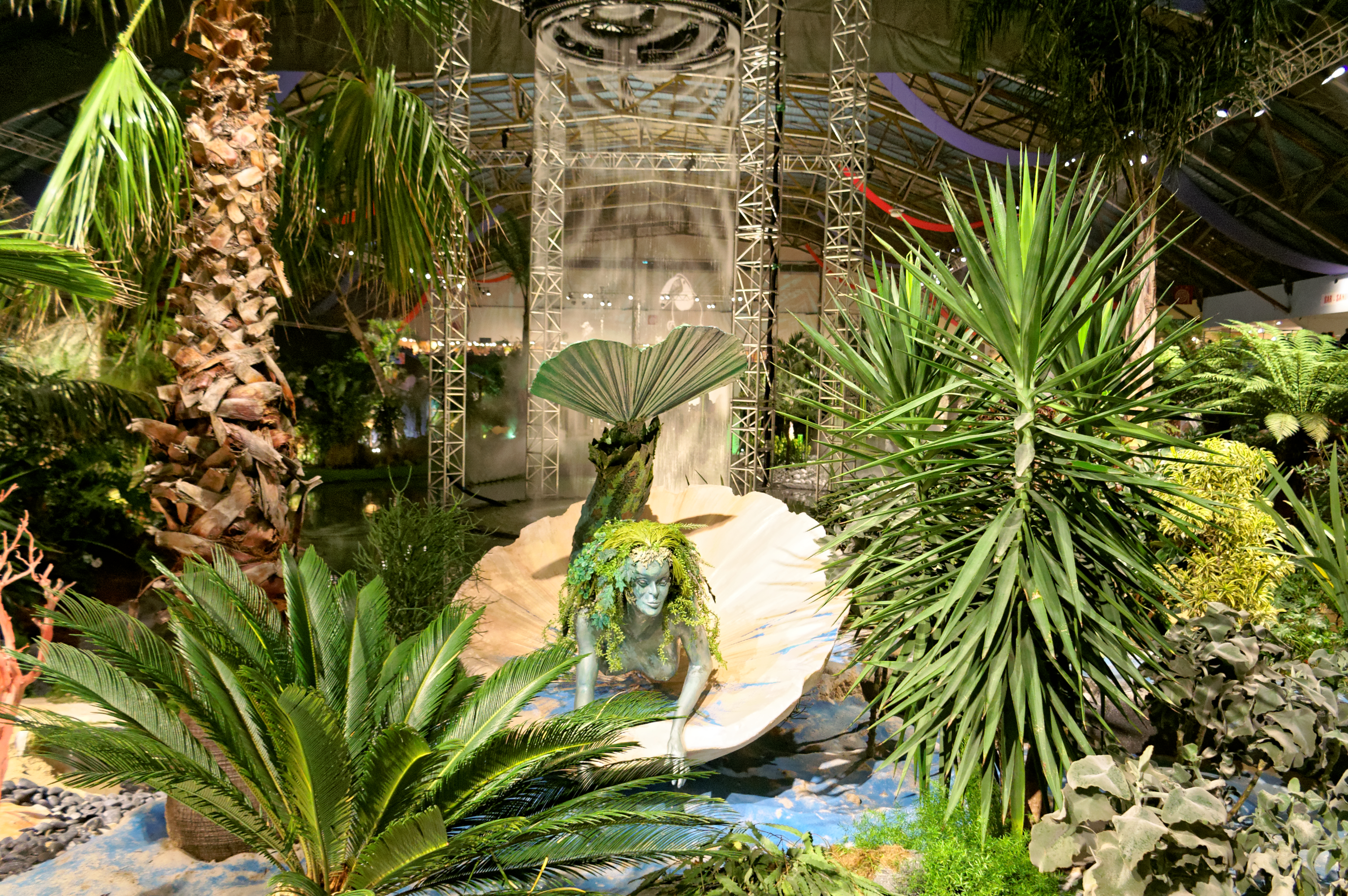

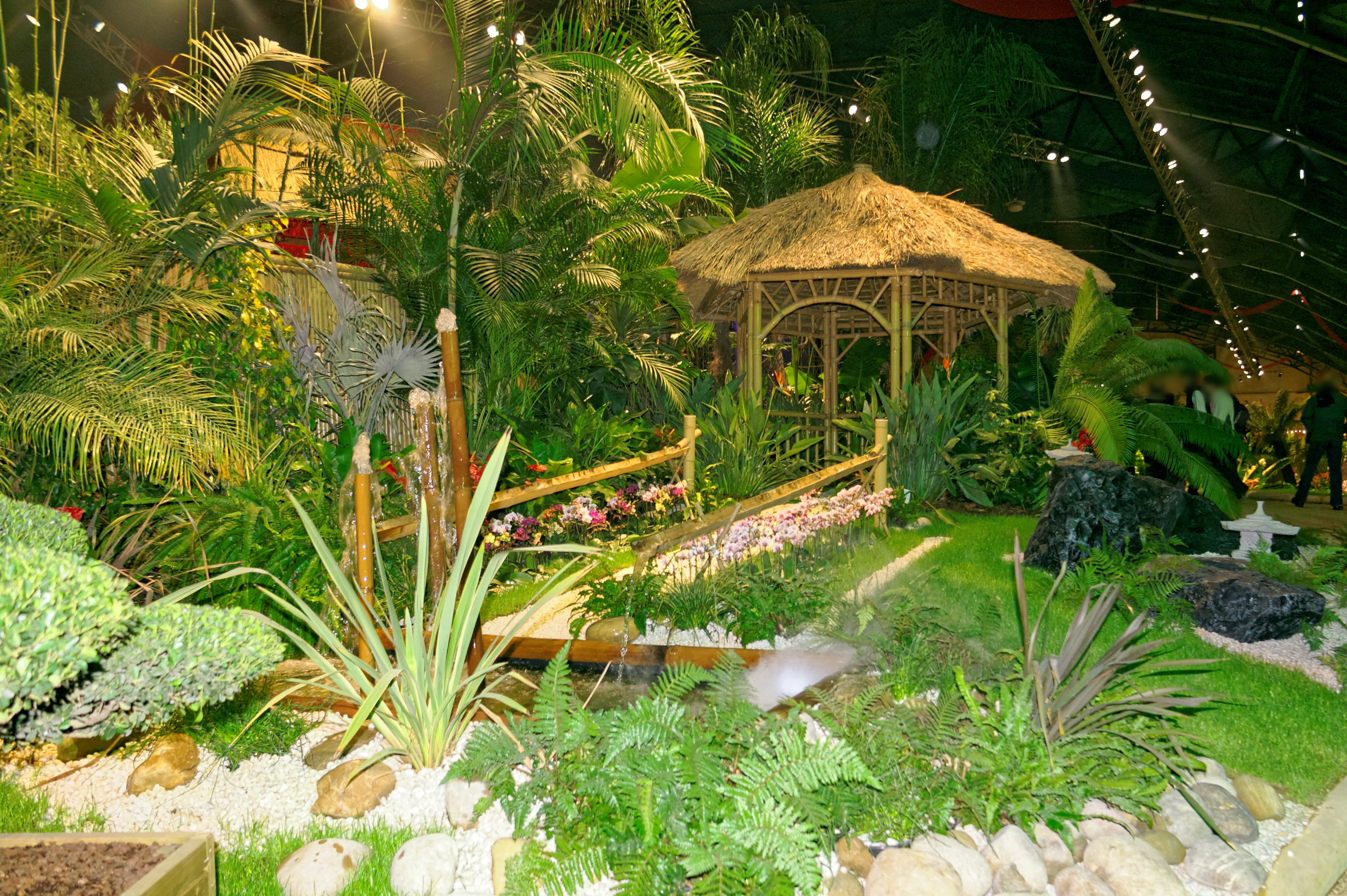

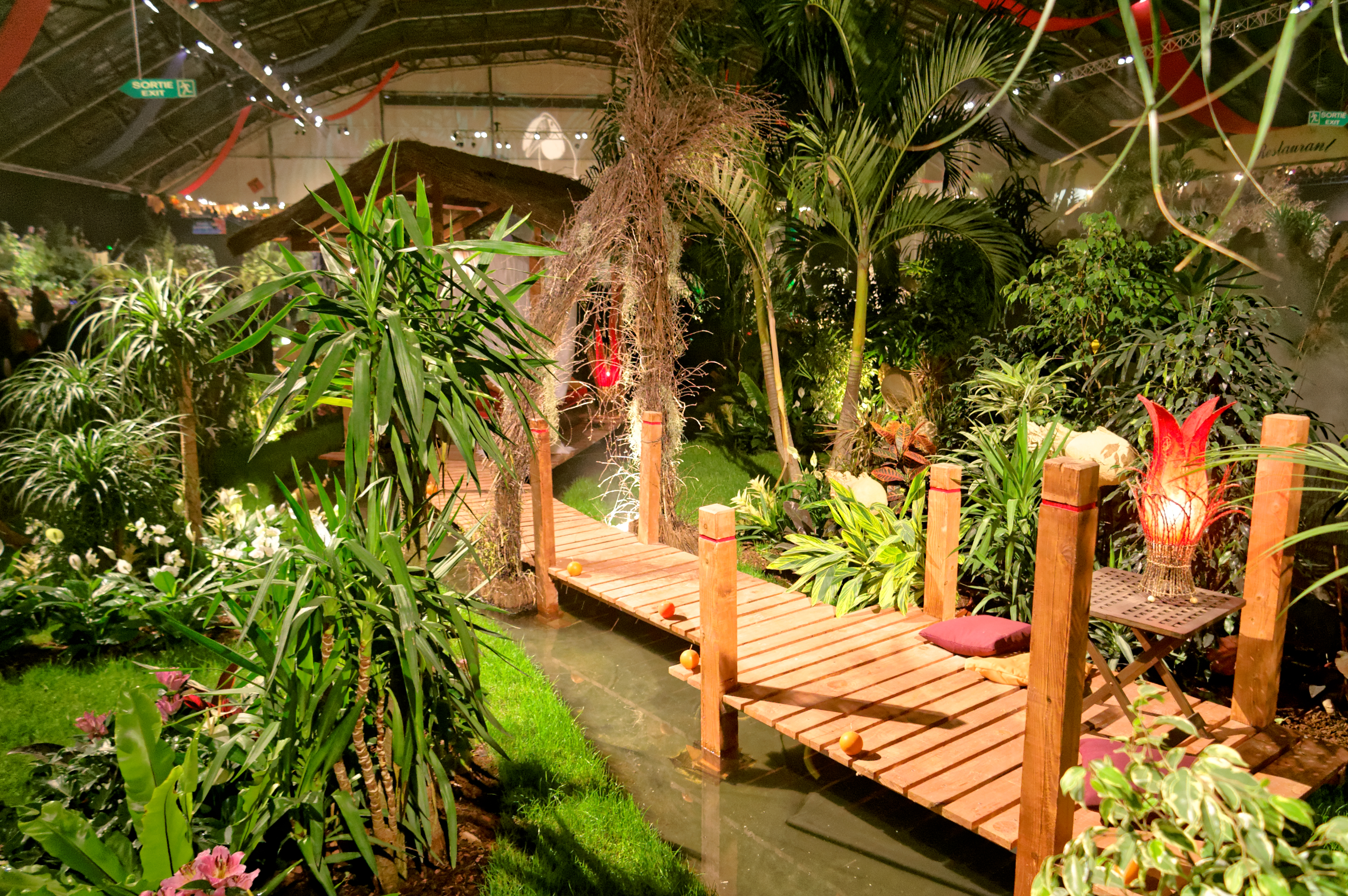

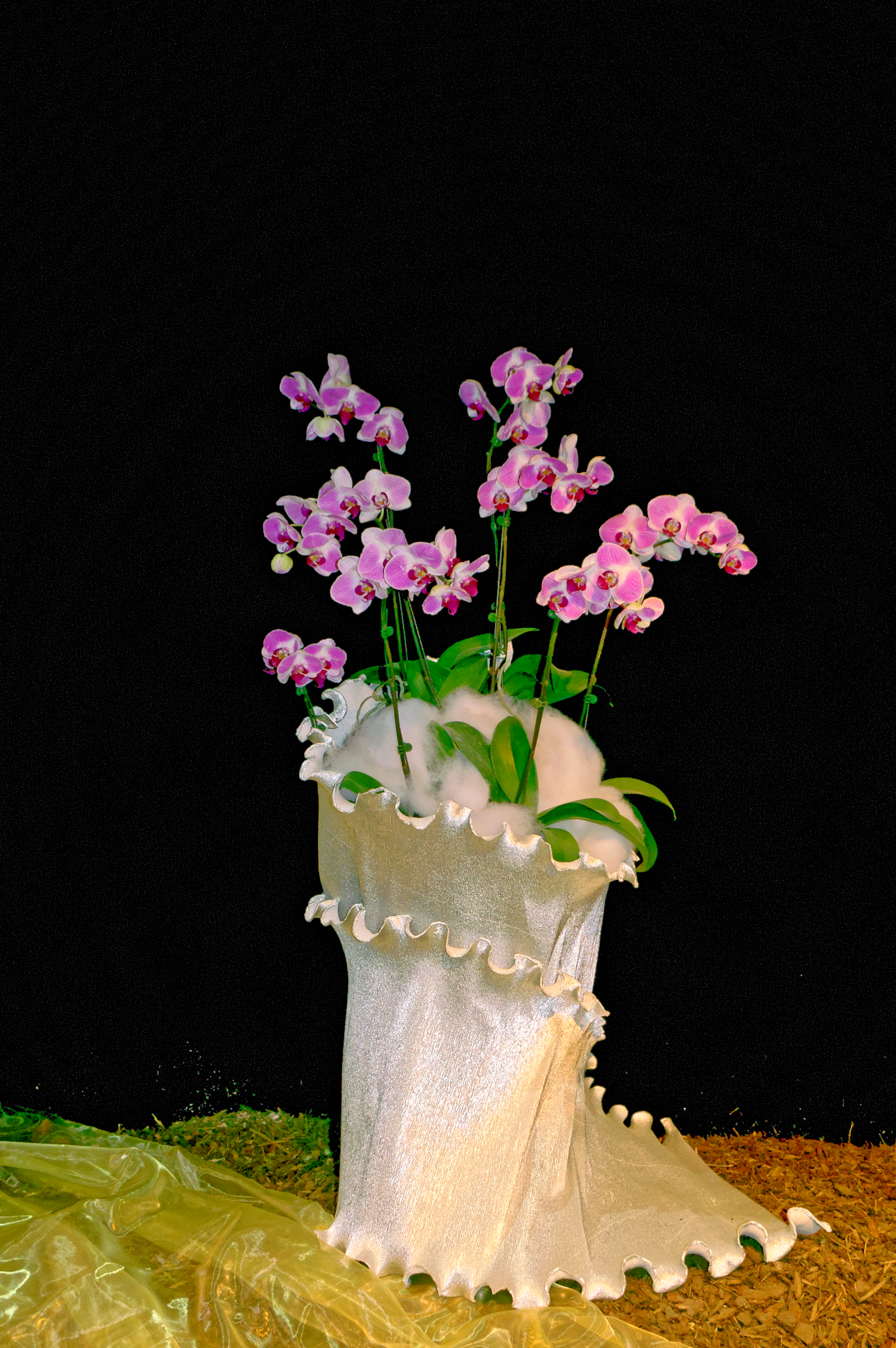

== Florissimo 2015 ==
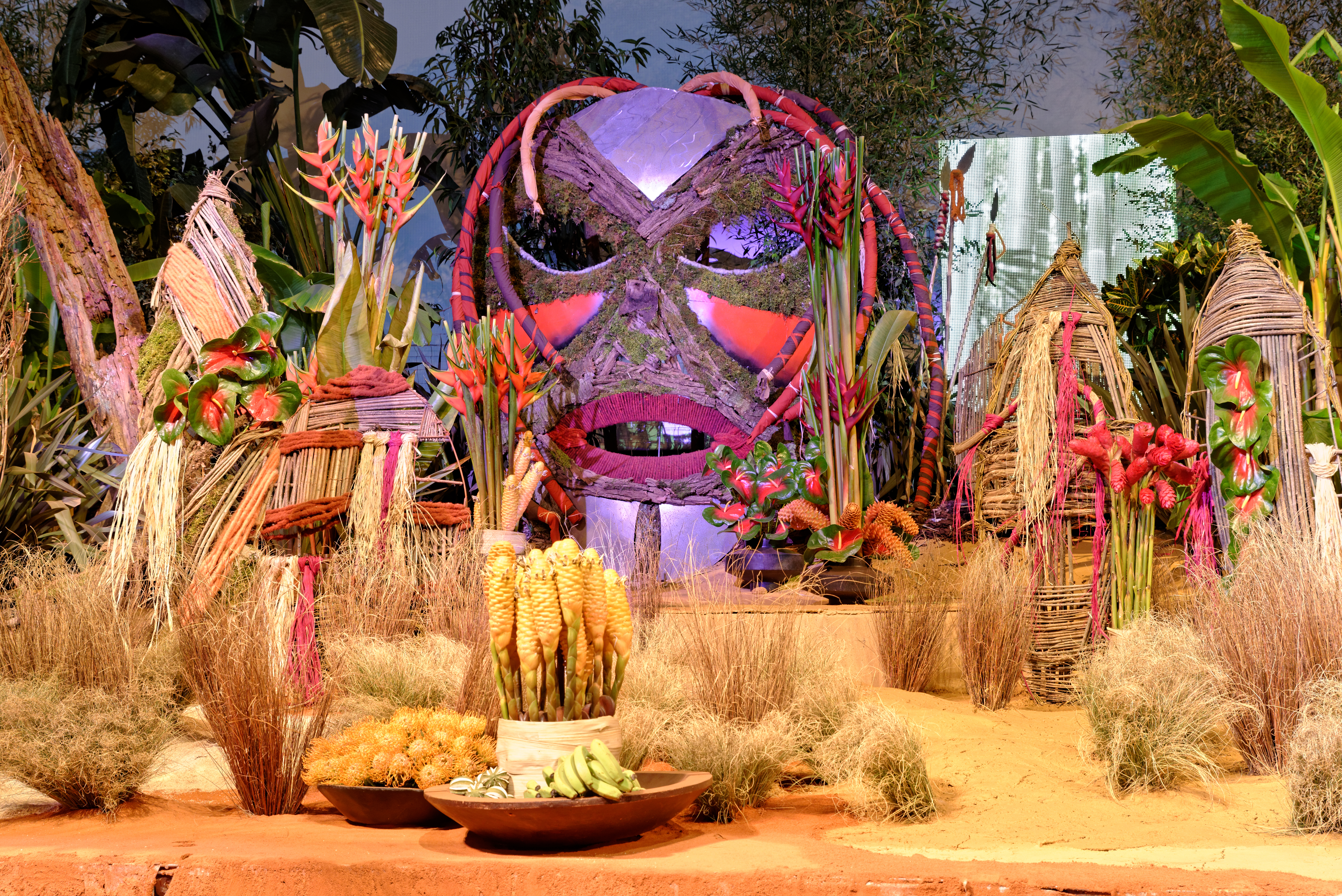

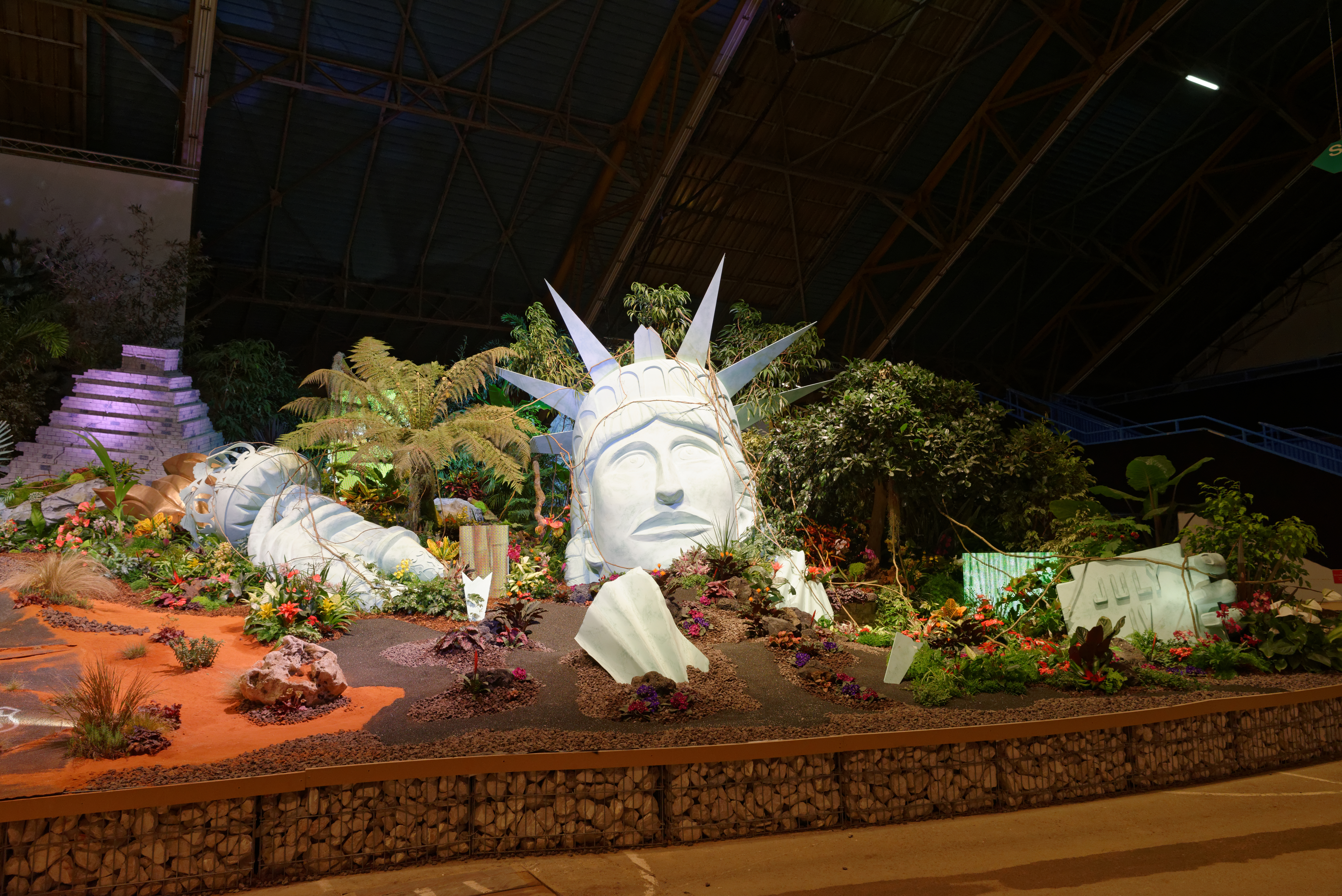

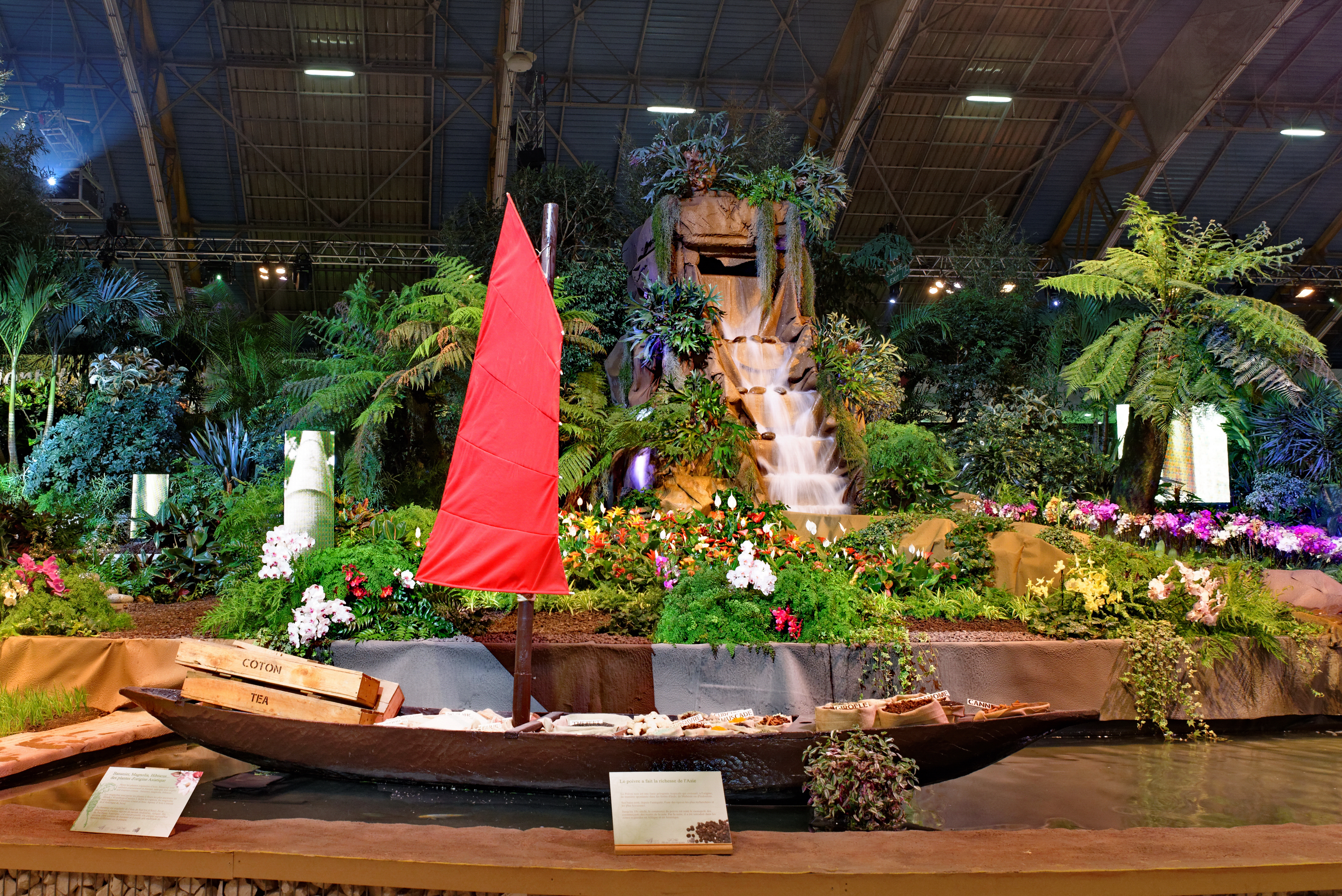

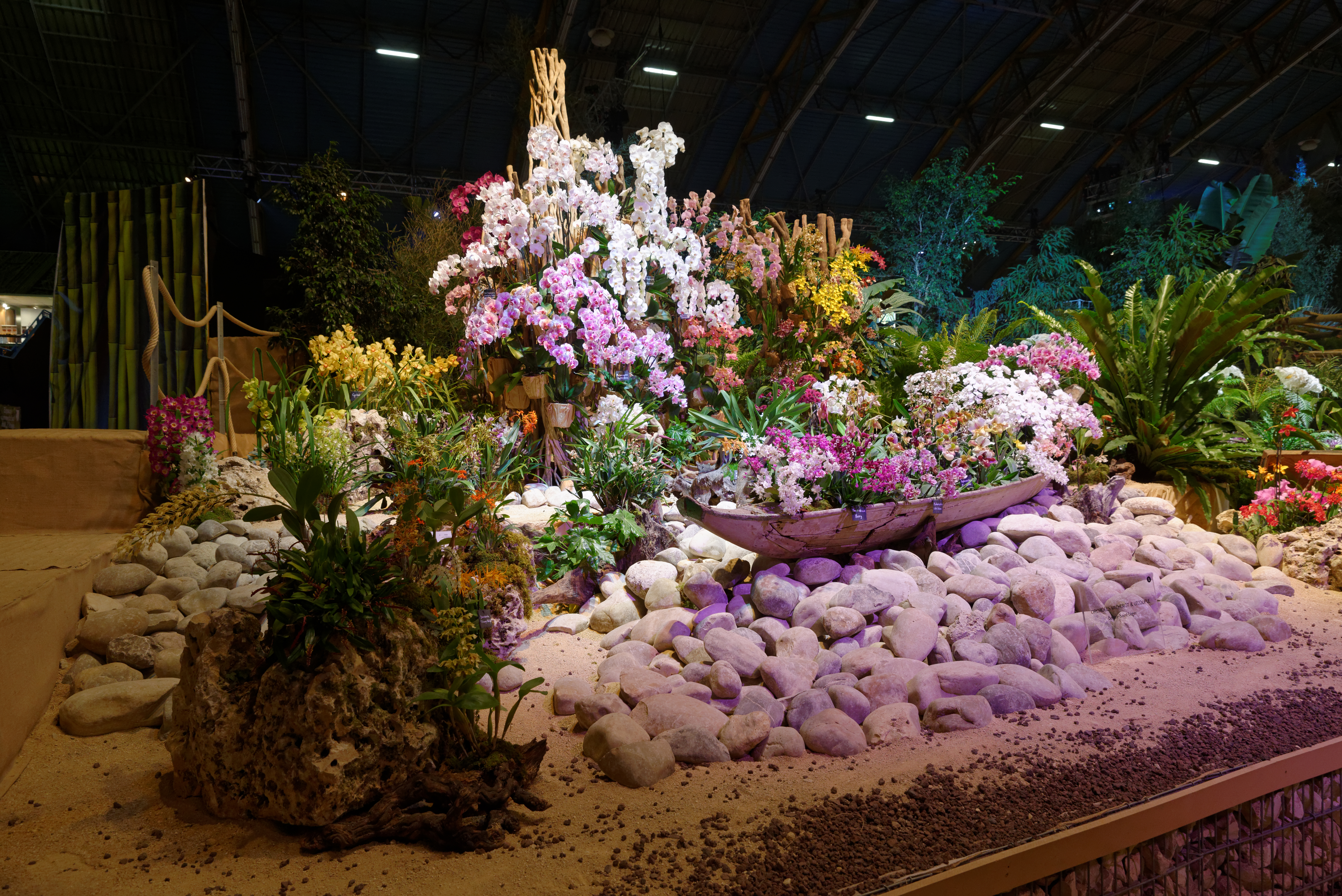

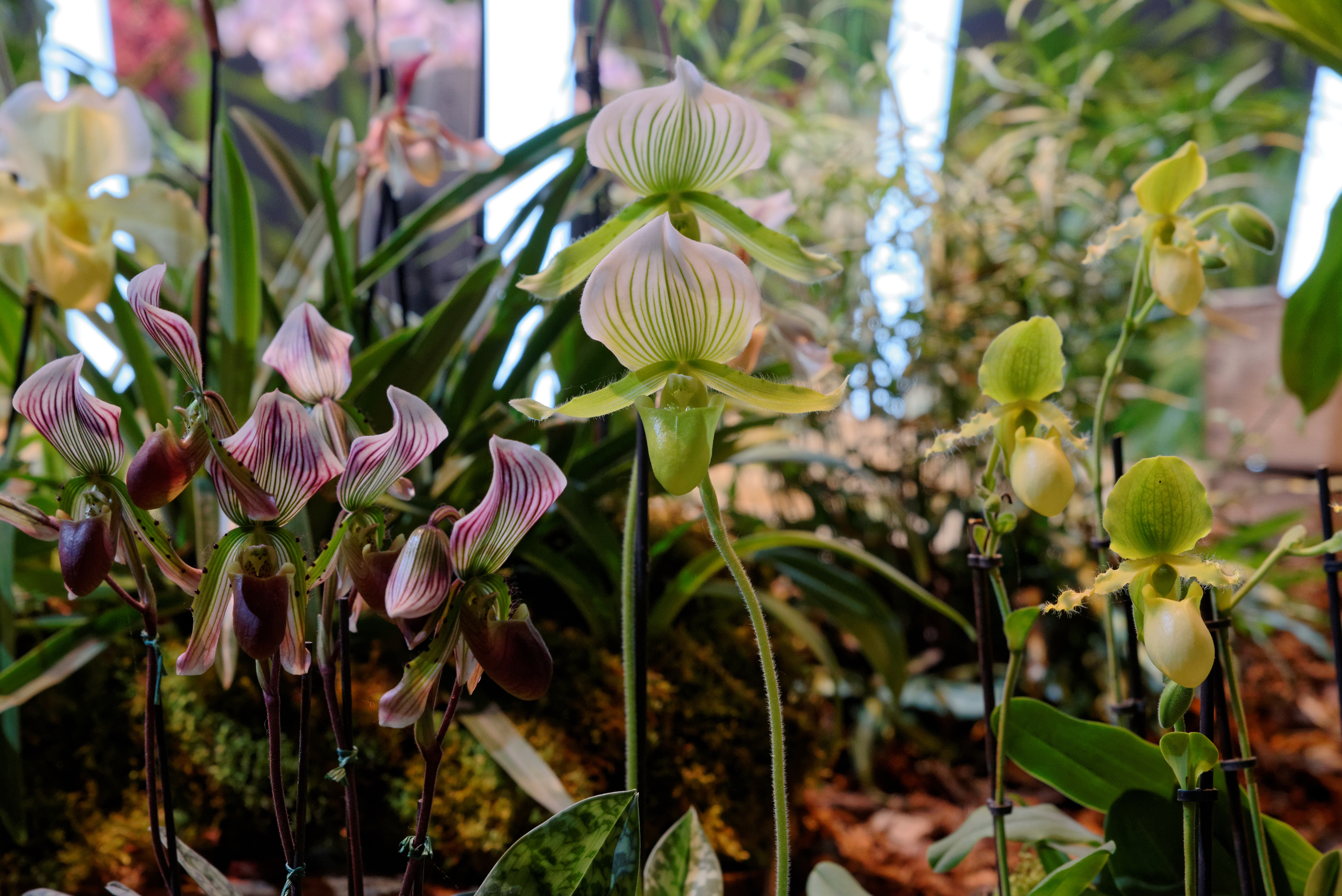

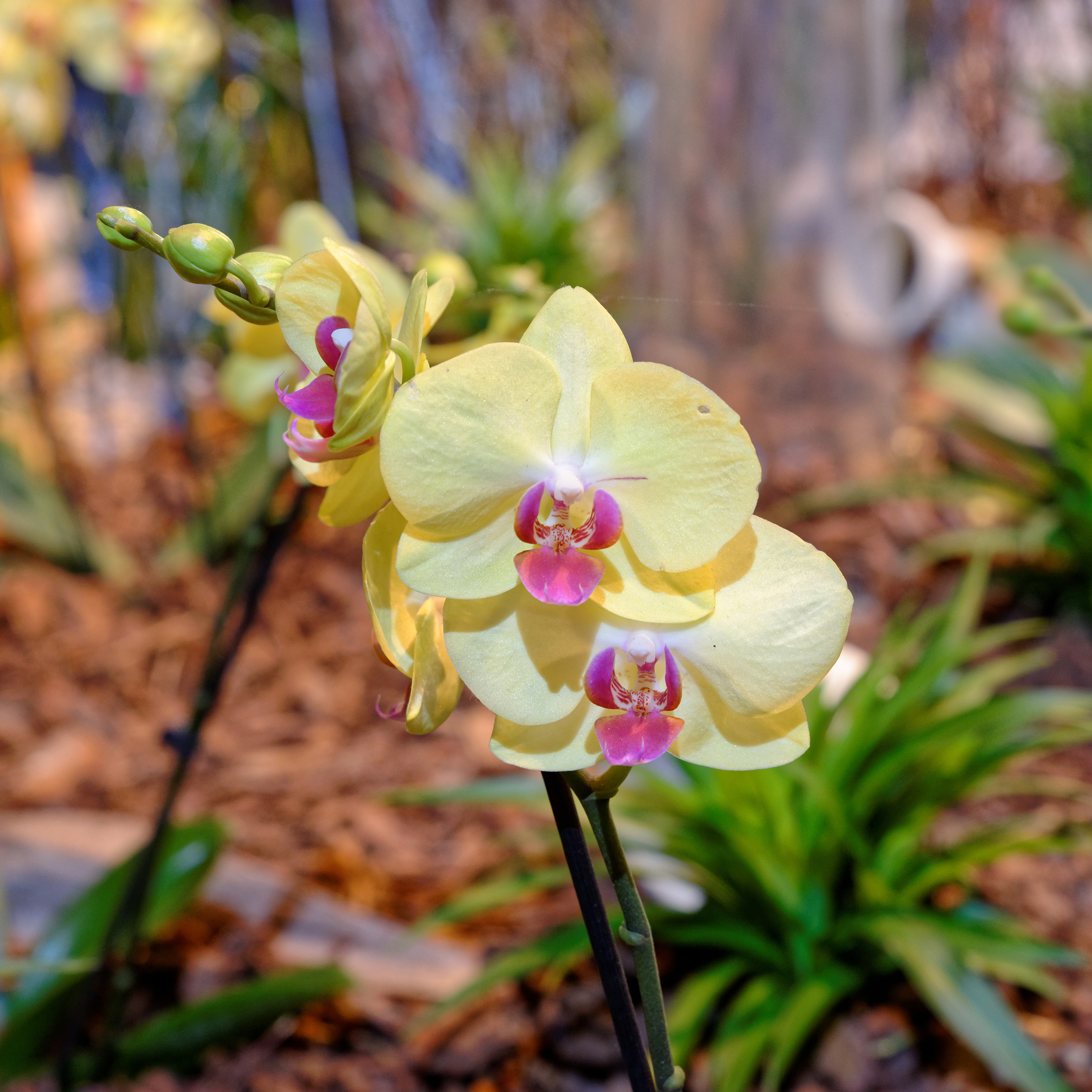

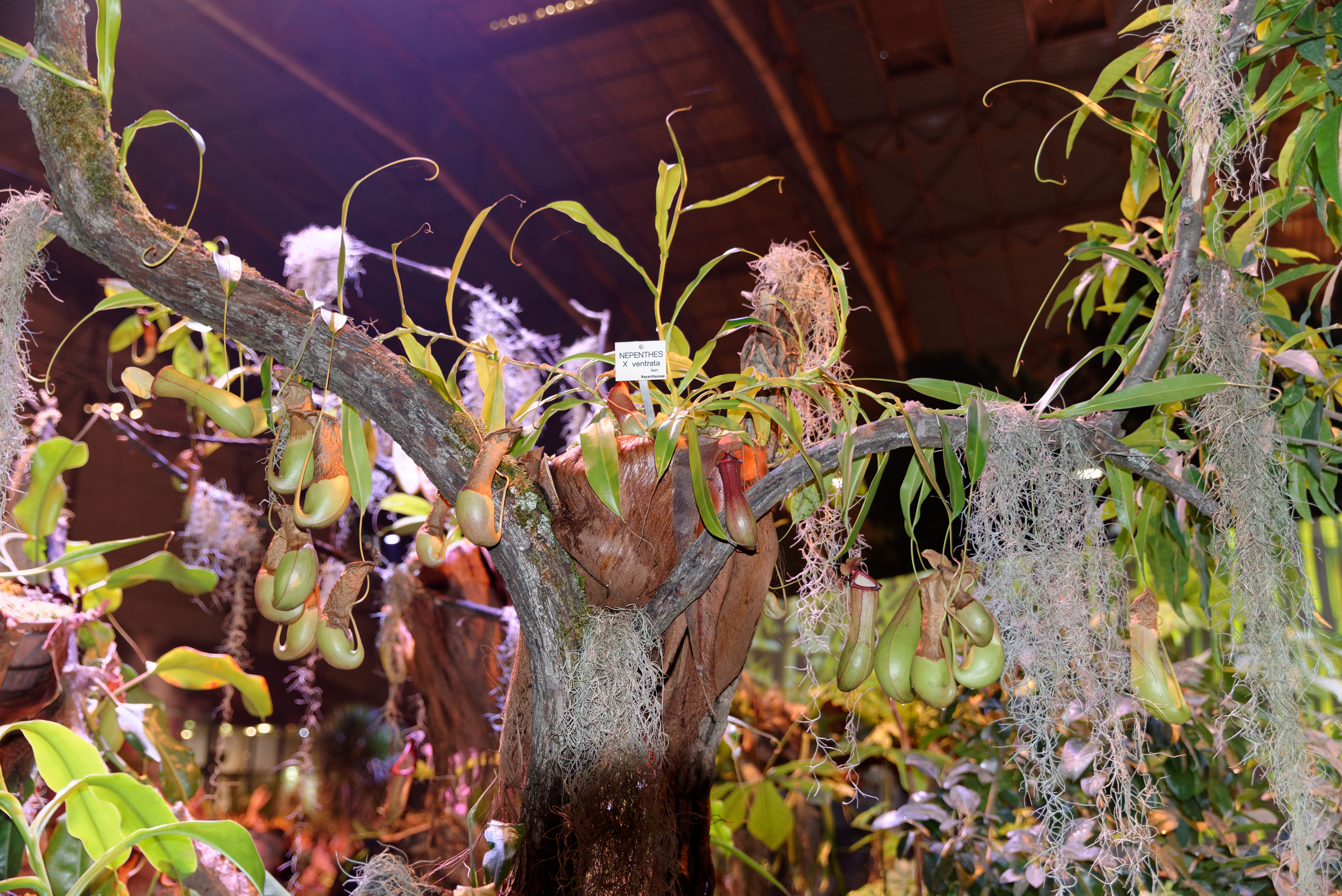

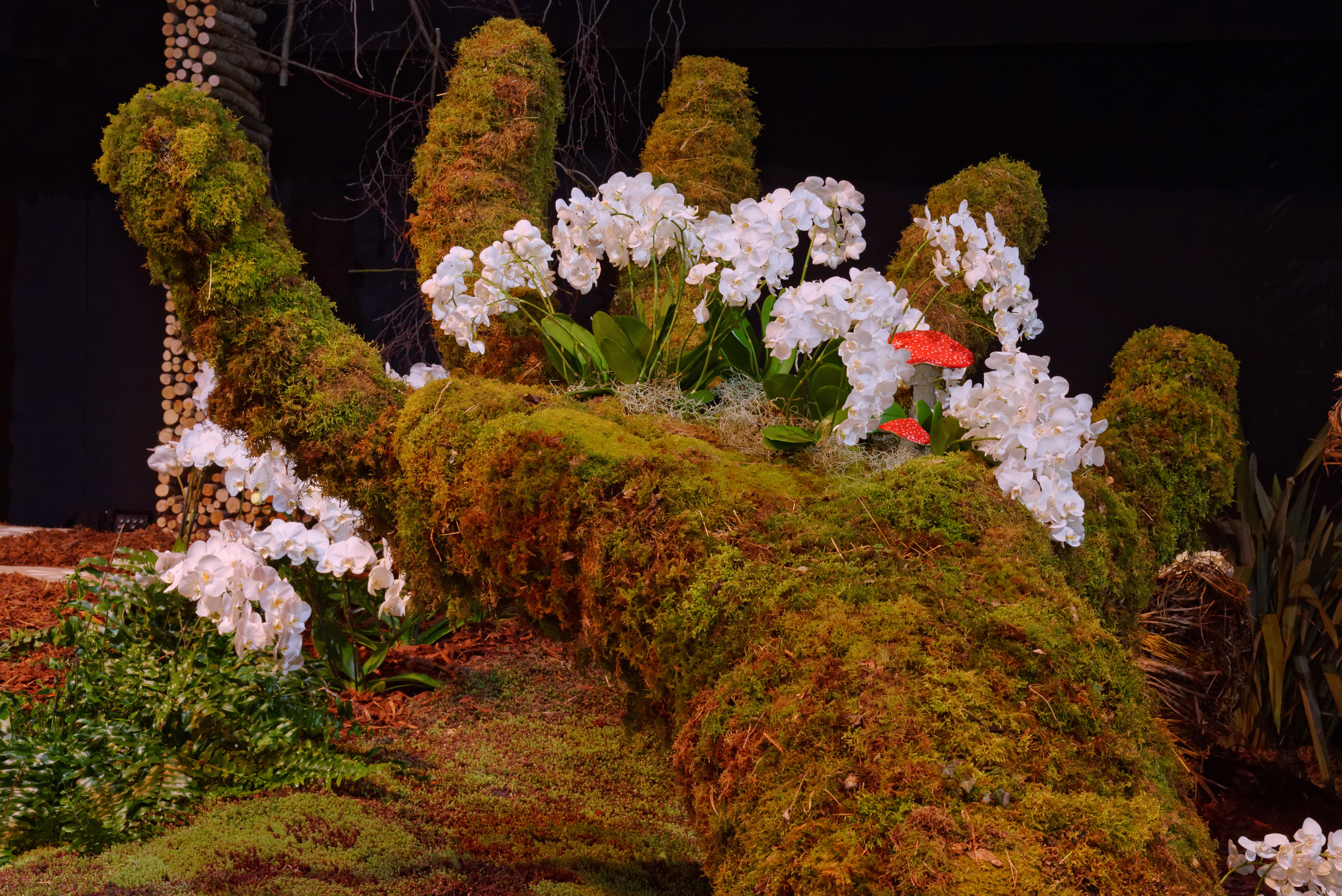

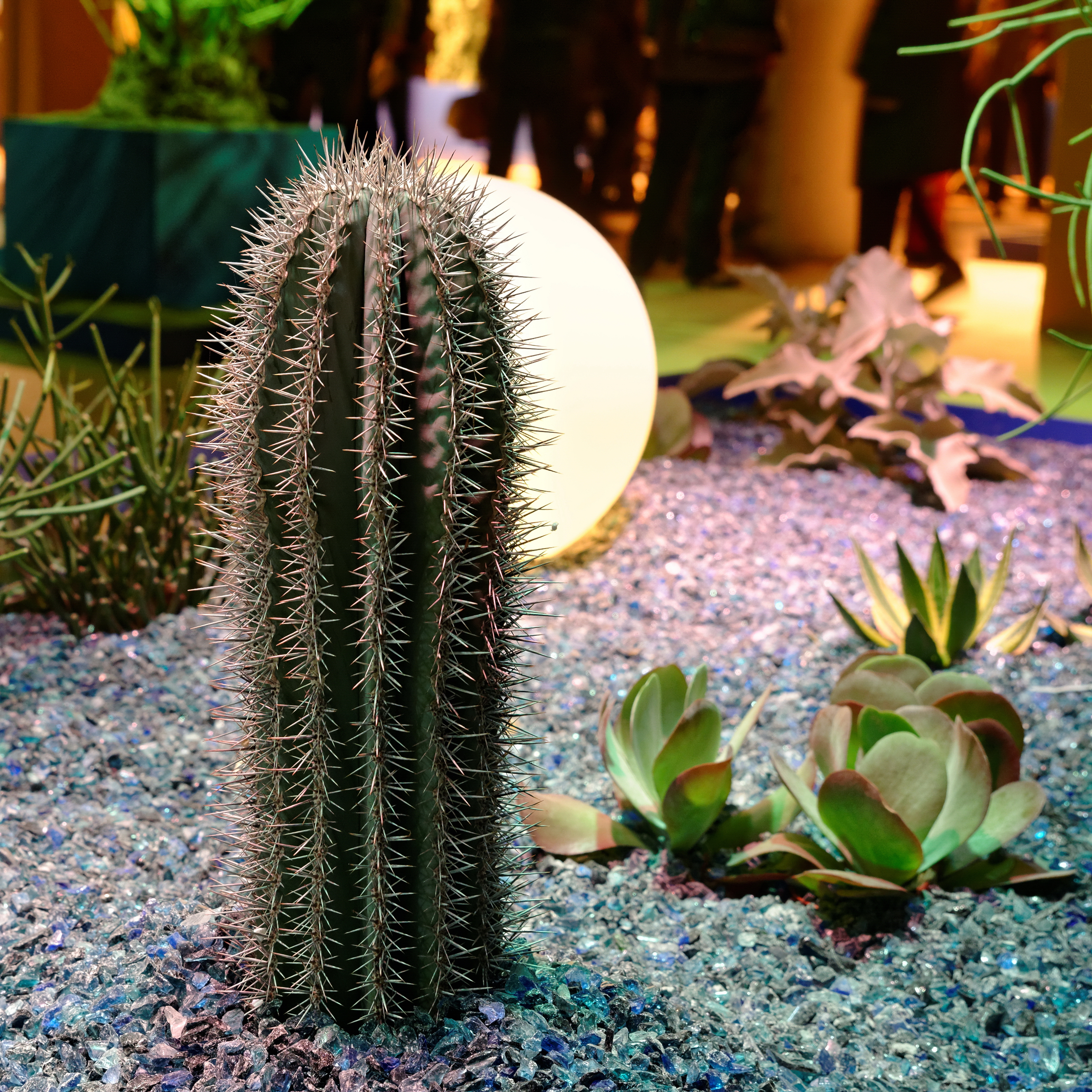

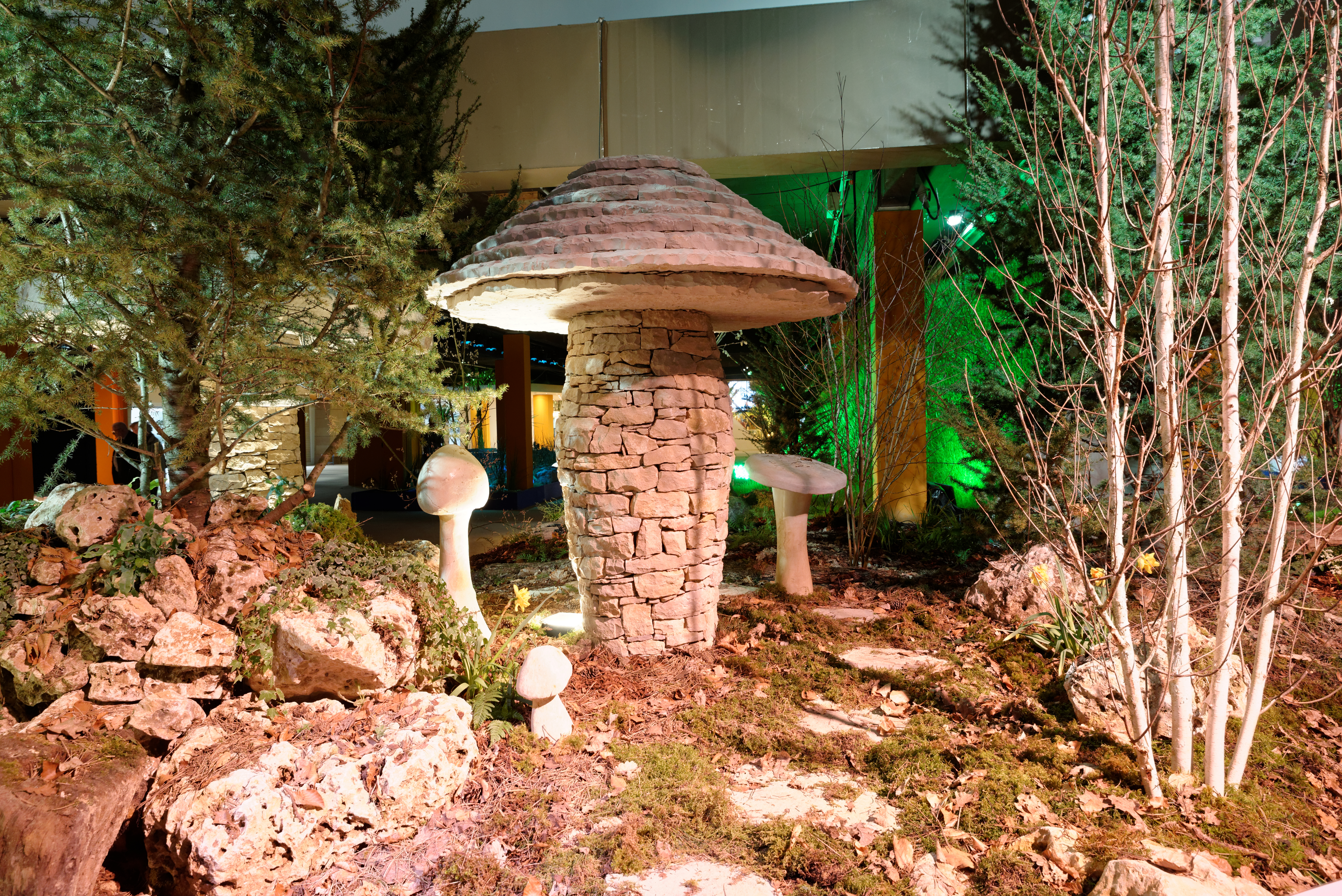

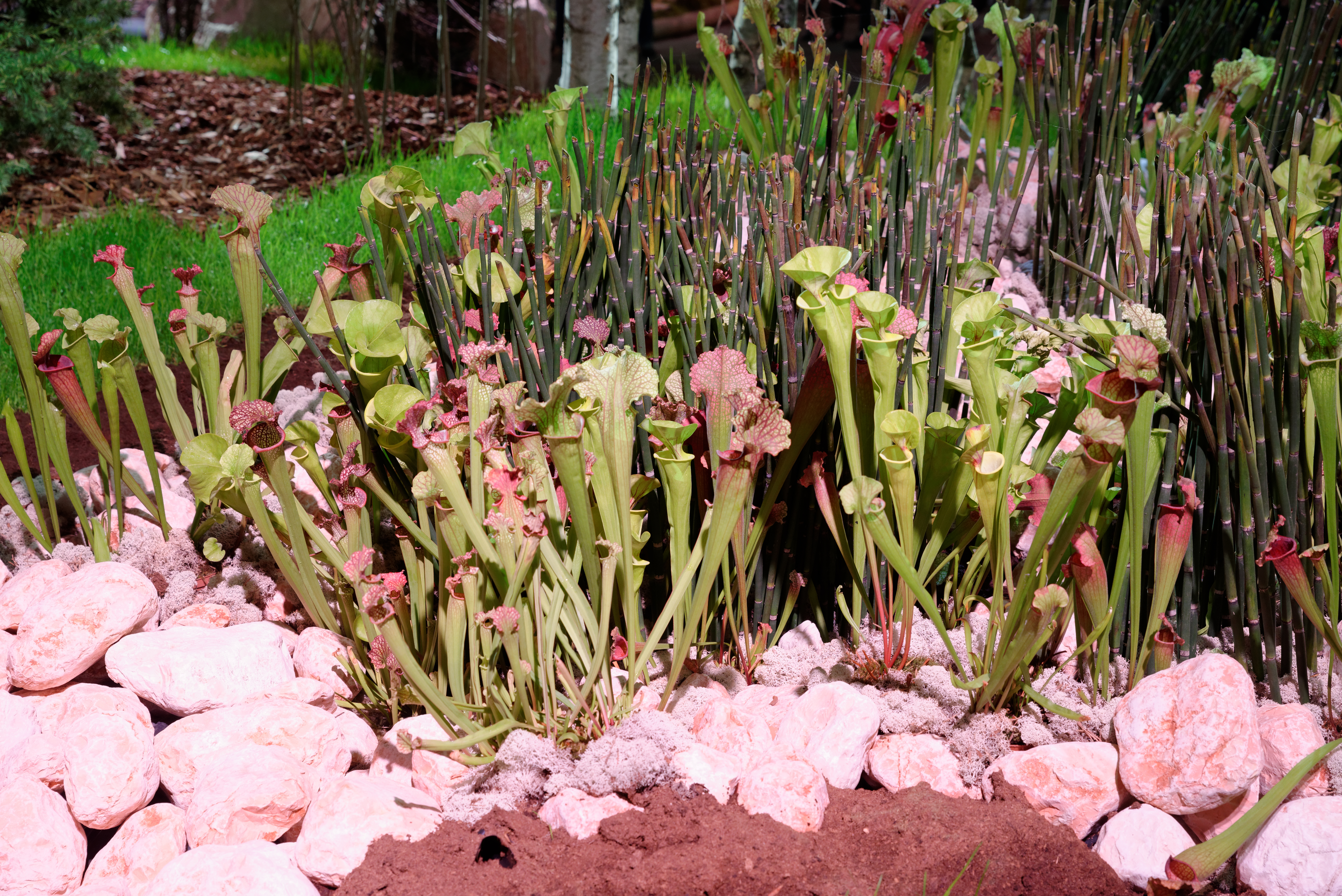
