= Wiener Internationale Gartenschau 74 =

Garden festival in Vienna, Austria

Coordinates: 48.1469°N 16.4028°E

EXPO 1974 Vienna
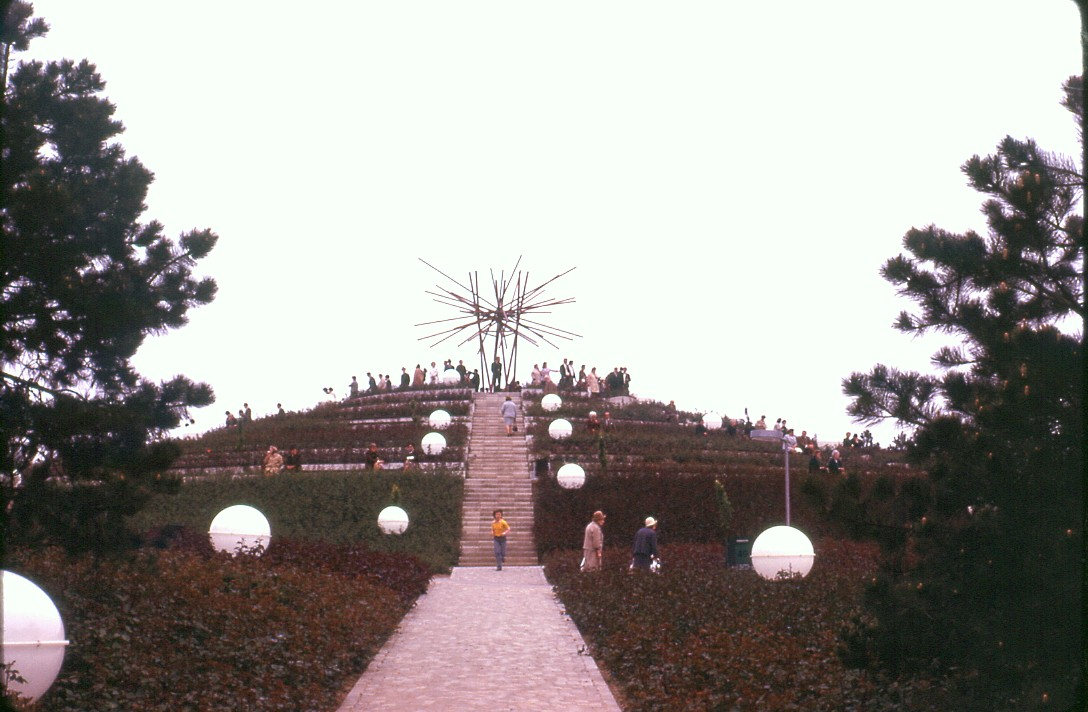
- The hill on the site of the WIG '74

Overview
- BIE-class: Horticultural exposition
- Name: Wiener Internationale Gartenschau 74
- Visitors: 2.6 million

Location
- Country: Austria
- City: Vienna
- Venue: Kurpark Oberlaa

Timeline
- Awarded: 1969

Horticultural expositions
- Previous: IGA 73 in Hamburg
- Next: Floralies Internationales de Montréal in Montreal

Specialized expositions
- Previous: Expo '71 in Budapest
- Next: Expo '75 in Okinawa

Universal expositions
- Previous: Expo '70 in Osaka
- Next: Seville Expo '92 in Seville

Simultaneous
- Specialized: Expo '74

The Wiener Internationale Gartenschau 74 (English: Vienna International Garden Show 74), often shortened to WIG 74, was a garden festival held in Vienna, Austria. Recognised by the Bureau International des Expositions, the Expo was the second international horticultural exposition to be held in Vienna under the auspices of the AIPH. The plans for the Expo began to develop shortly after the closing of the Wiener Internationale Gartenschau 64 held a decade earlier. Following the success of the 1964 exposition, the council was urged to re-organize a horticultural exhibition. An area on the south side of town that had once served as a recording field for silent films was ideally suited to create a large park. In 1969, architect Erich Hanke won an international design competition. He then formed several working groups of landscape architects from various countries, who made different designs for parts of the site. The best designs were incorporated into the grounds. A monorail was built to transport the visitors, but was eventually scrapped due to lack of success.
