= Floriade 1960 =

Horticultural festival in Rotterdam, Netherlands

EXPO 1960 Rotterdam

Overview
- BIE-class: Horticultural exposition
- Name: Floriade 1960

Location
- Country: Netherlands
- City: Rotterdam
- Venue: Het Park

Timeline
- Opening: 25 March 1960
- Closure: 25 September 1960

Horticultural expositions
- Next: Hamburg 1963 in Hamburg

Specialized expositions
- Previous: Interbau in Berlin
- Next: Expo 61 in Turin

Universal expositions
- Previous: Expo 58 in Brussels
- Next: Century 21 Exposition in Seattle

Floriade 1960 was a horticultural exhibition and garden festival held in Rotterdam, Netherlands which took place from 25 March to 25 September 1960 in Het Park near the Meuse River. It was the first edition of the Floriade to be organised under the auspices of the Association of International Horticultural Producers (AIPH) and also the first international horticultural exposition to be recognised by the Bureau International des Expositions.

To mark the occasion of the Floriade, the Euromast was built and inaugurated. The tower was 107 meters high, making it the tallest structure in the city. The tower's height was increased after the end of the Floriade.

== Gallery ==
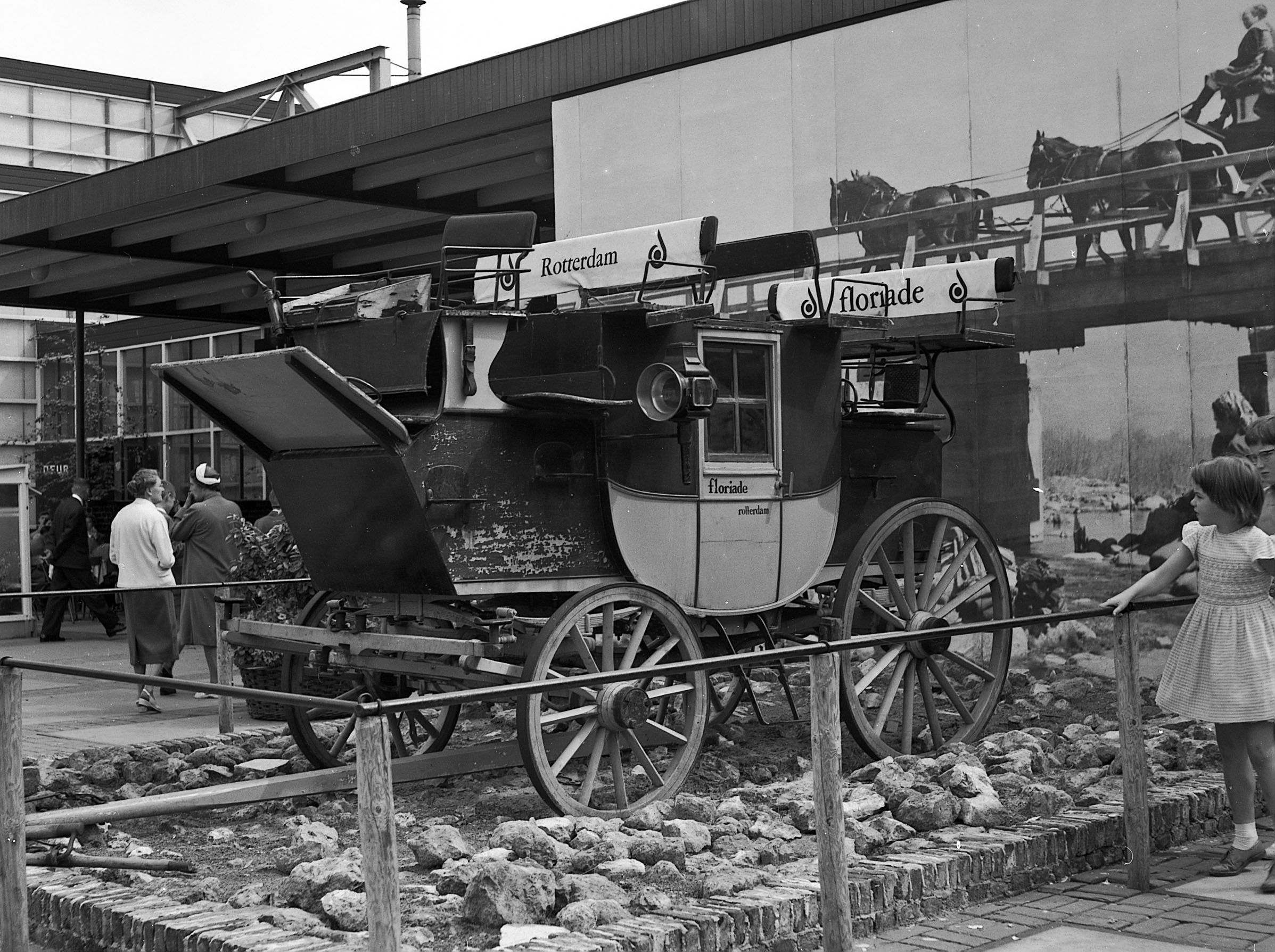

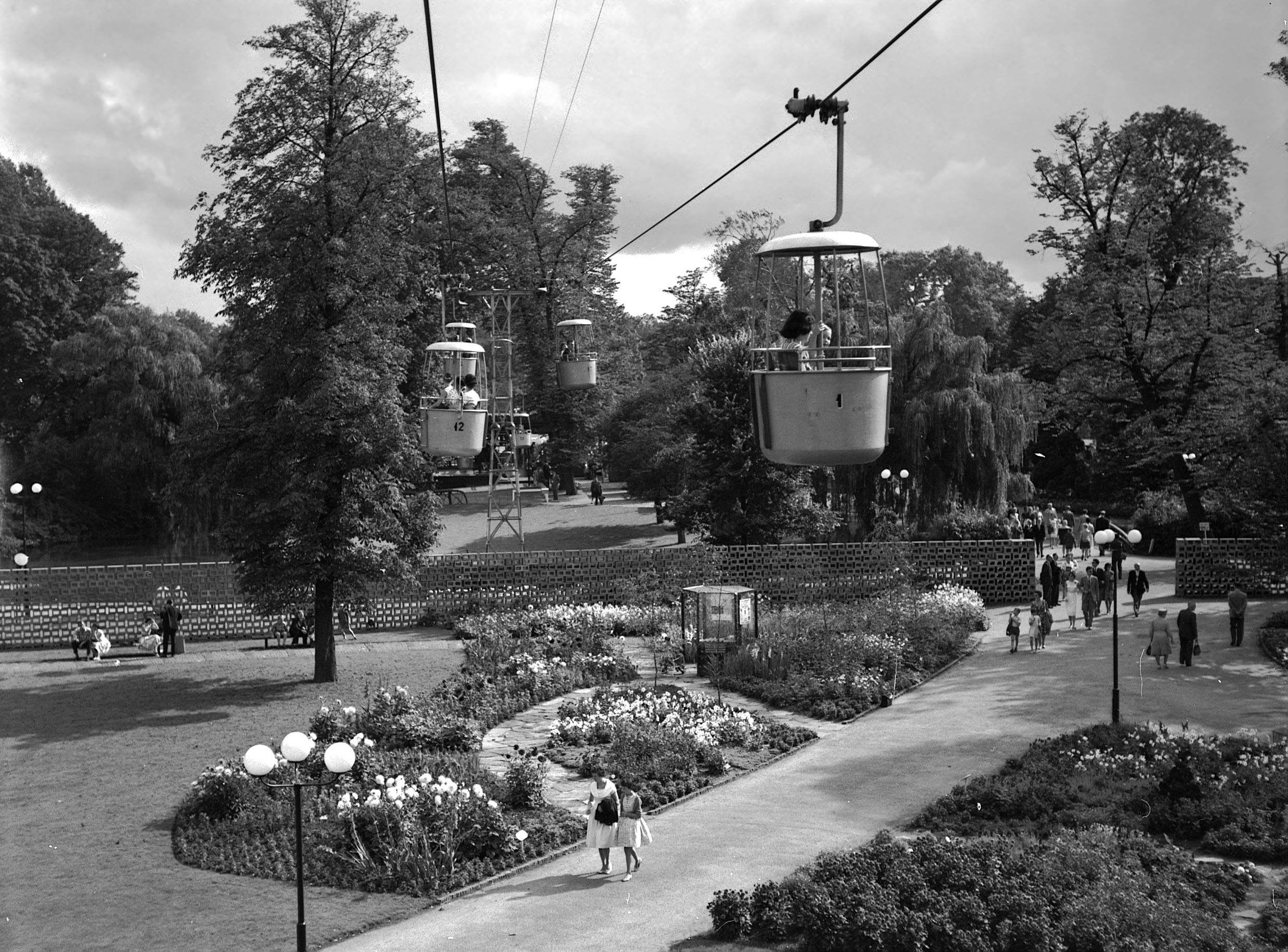

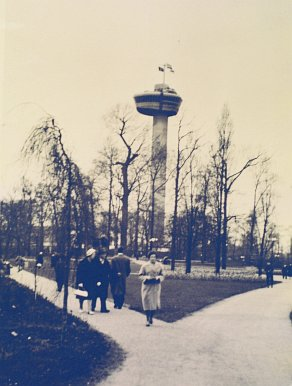

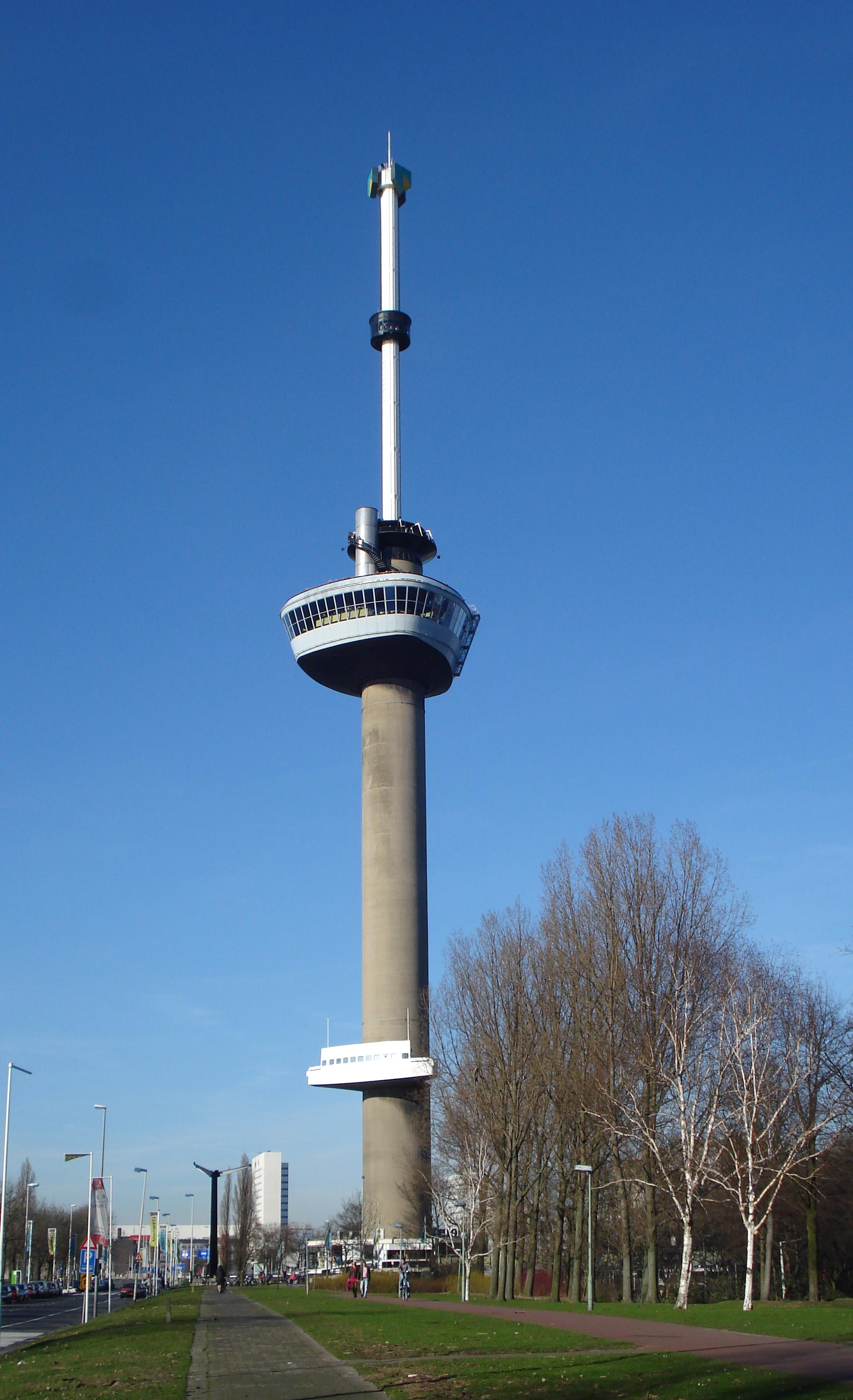
