= Floriade 2002 =

International horticultural exposition in the Netherlands

Coordinates: 52.3358°N 4.6675°E

EXPO 2002 Haarlemmermeer
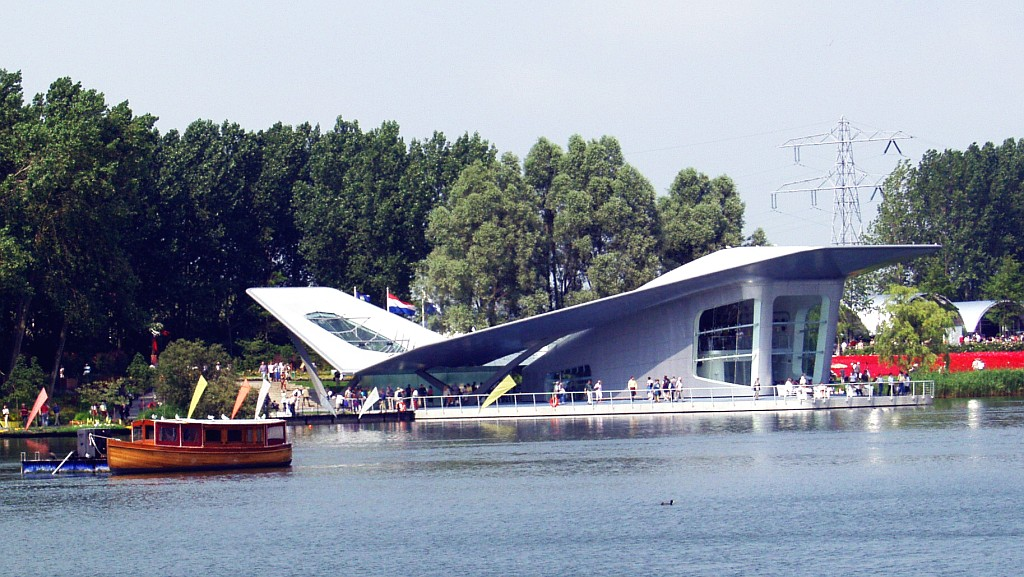
- The Haarlemmermeer Pavilion

Overview
- BIE-class: Horticultural exposition
- Name: Floriade 2002
- Area: 65 hectares

Participant(s)
- Countries: 30

Location
- Country: Netherlands
- City: Haarlemmermeer
- Venue: Haarlemmermeer Woods

Timeline
- Opening: April 6, 2002
- Closure: October 20, 2002

Horticultural expositions
- Previous: Expo '99 in Kunming
- Next: Expo 2003 in Rostock

Specialized expositions
- Previous: Expo '98 in Lisbon
- Next: Expo 2008 in Zaragoza

Universal expositions
- Previous: Expo 2000 in Hanover
- Next: Expo 2005 in Aichi

The 2002 Floriade international horticultural exposition took place from April 6 to October 20, 2002, in Haarlemmermeer, Netherlands, with a theme of Contribution of Horticulture in the quality of life in the 21st century. Recognised by the Bureau International des Expositions (BIE), the festival covered 65 hectares and had 30 participating countries.

Across the Floriade site is the Geniedijk, part of the Defence Line of Amsterdam, while the "Lake Side" was located in the Haarlemmermeer Woods. From the artificial mountain, visitors had a substantial view of the area. The Zuidtangent was opened around the same time as the Floriade, with temporary additional stops opened along the north and south entrances to the festival. The north stop is still occasionally used during events and festivals held on the site of the Floriade. The 2002 Floriade was also the site of the Spike and Suzy album, The Bright Floriade.

== Gallery ==
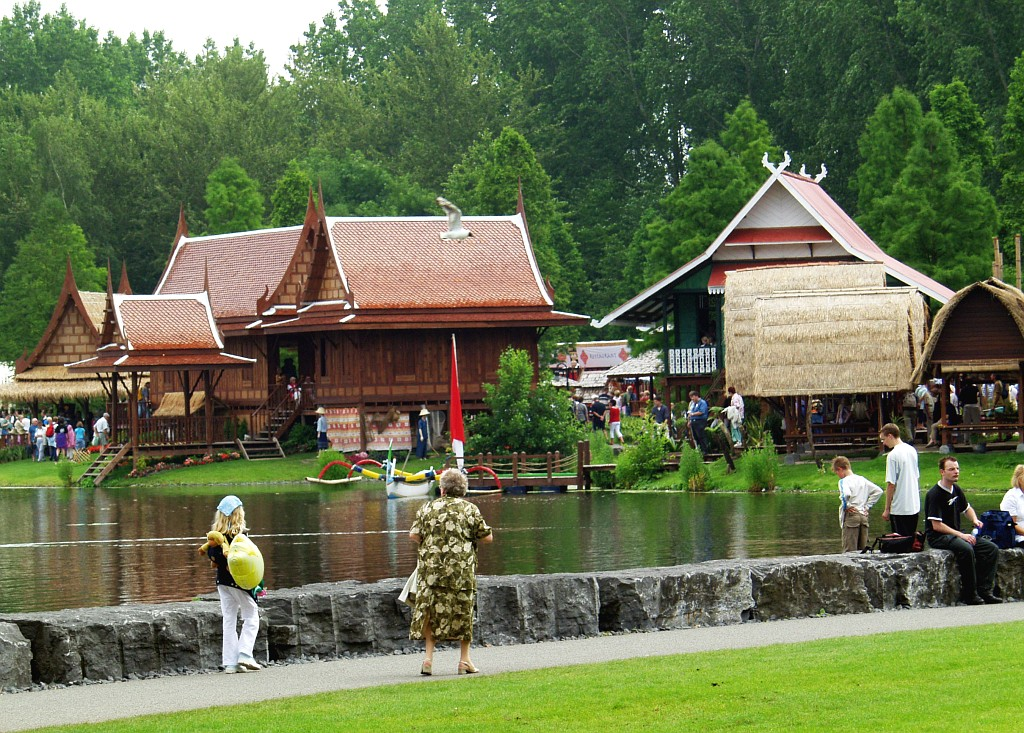
International pavilions

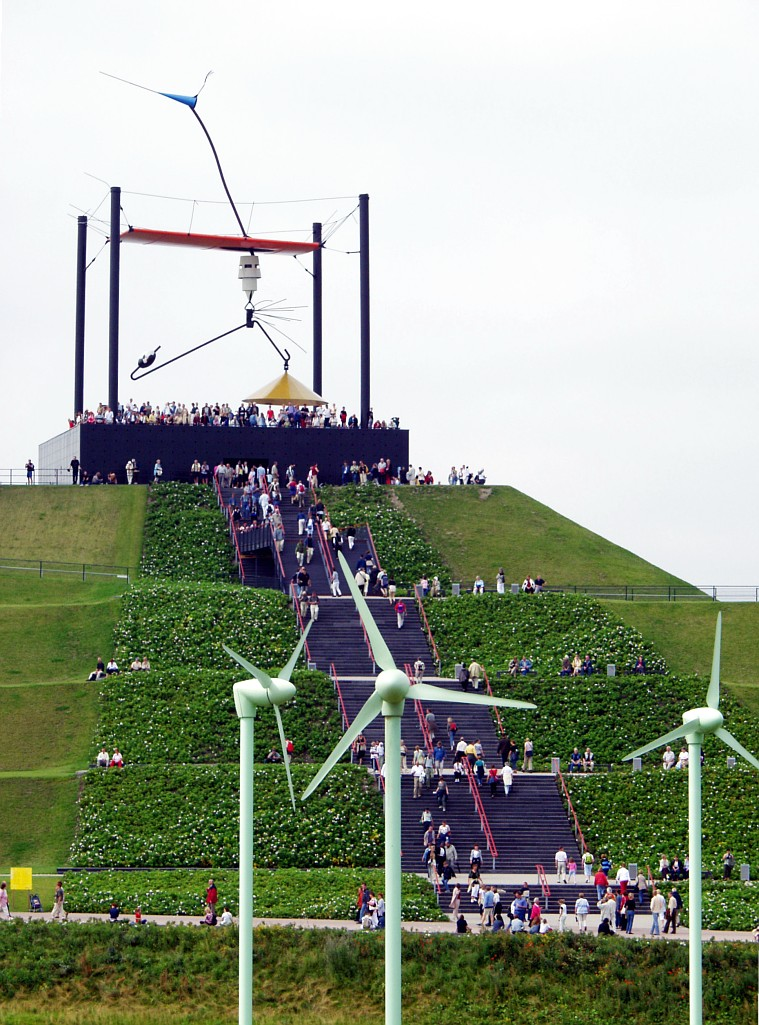
People-mover on "Spotter's Hill"

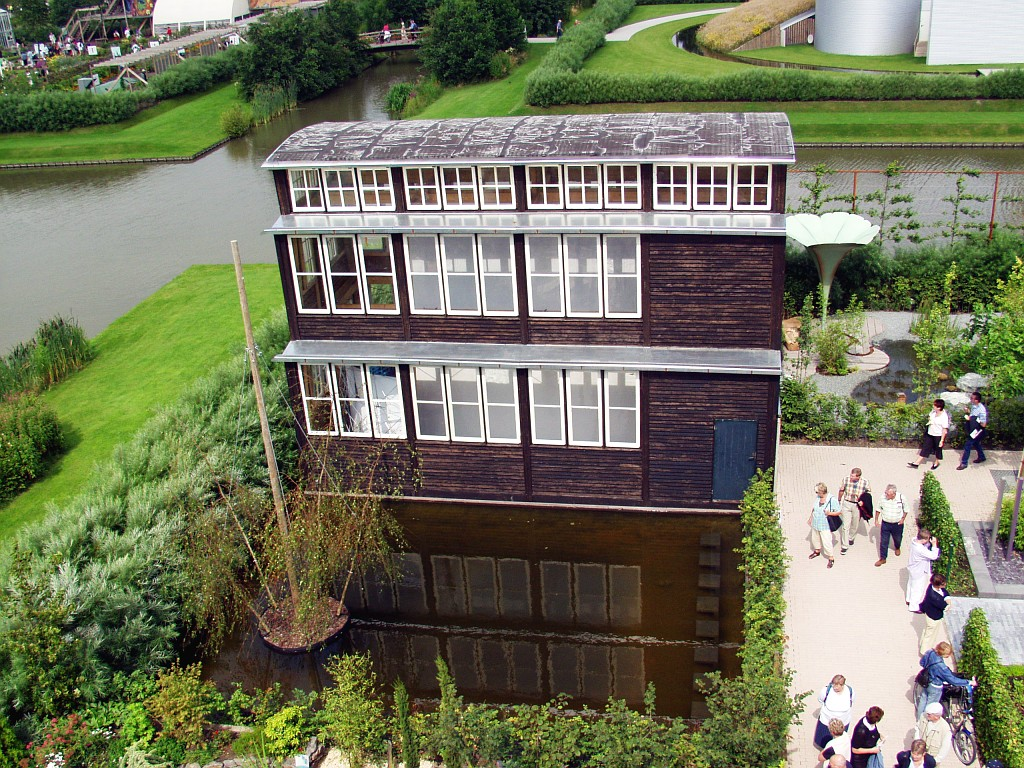
Rooftop gardens

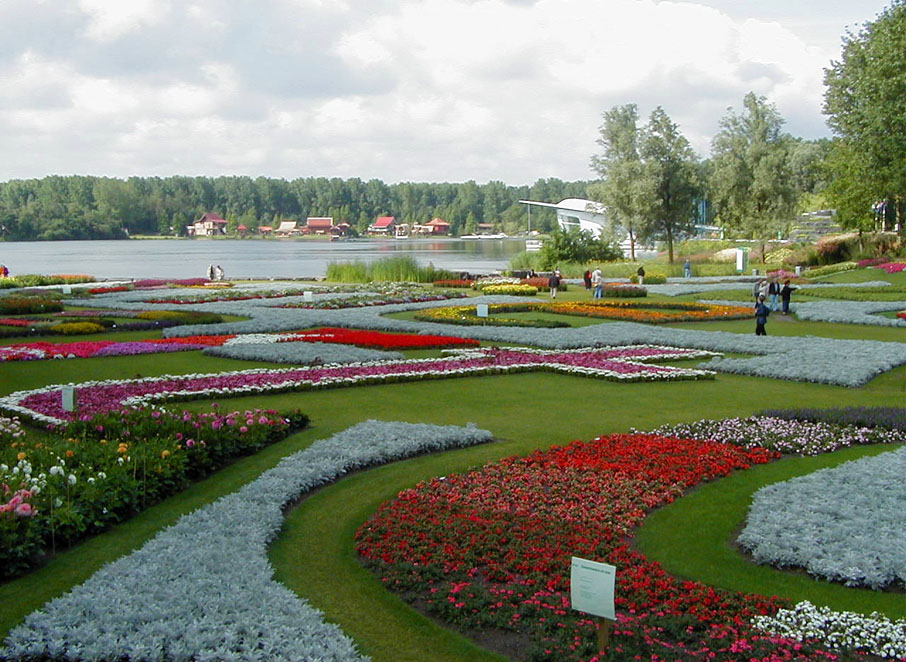
The large garden
