= Internationale Gartenbauausstellung 73 =

Garden festival in Hamburg, Germany

Coordinates: 53.5611°N 9.9833°E

EXPO 1973 Hamburg

Overview
- BIE-class: Horticultural exposition
- Name: International Gartenbauausstellung 73

Location
- Country: Germany
- City: Hamburg
- Venue: Planten un Blomen

Timeline
- Opening: April 27, 1973
- Closure: October 7, 1973

Horticultural expositions
- Previous: Floriade 1972 in Amsterdam
- Next: Vienna 74 in Vienna

Specialized expositions
- Previous: Expo '71 in Budapest
- Next: Expo '74 in Spokane

Universal expositions
- Previous: Expo '70 in Osaka
- Next: Seville Expo '92 in Seville

The International Gartenbauausstellung 73 (IGA '73) was a garden festival held in Hamburg, Germany, which was recognized by the Bureau International des Expositions. The exposition was the 6th edition of the international horticultural exposition organised under the auspices of the Association of International Horticultural Producers (AIPH) and the second held at Planten un Blomen park in Hamburg. The exhibition took place on the same site where IGA 63 was held a decade earlier. There were some changes to the site location, such as the vaulting of the Marseillerstrasse so that visitors throughout the area without crossing could visit. Instead of a cable car, a park trail was constructed on the site to provide for visitors. The line had four stations and took 30 minutes to complete a lap.
