= Expo 2021 (Yangzhou, China) =

Horticultural exhibition in Yangzhou, China

Expo 2021 Yangzhou
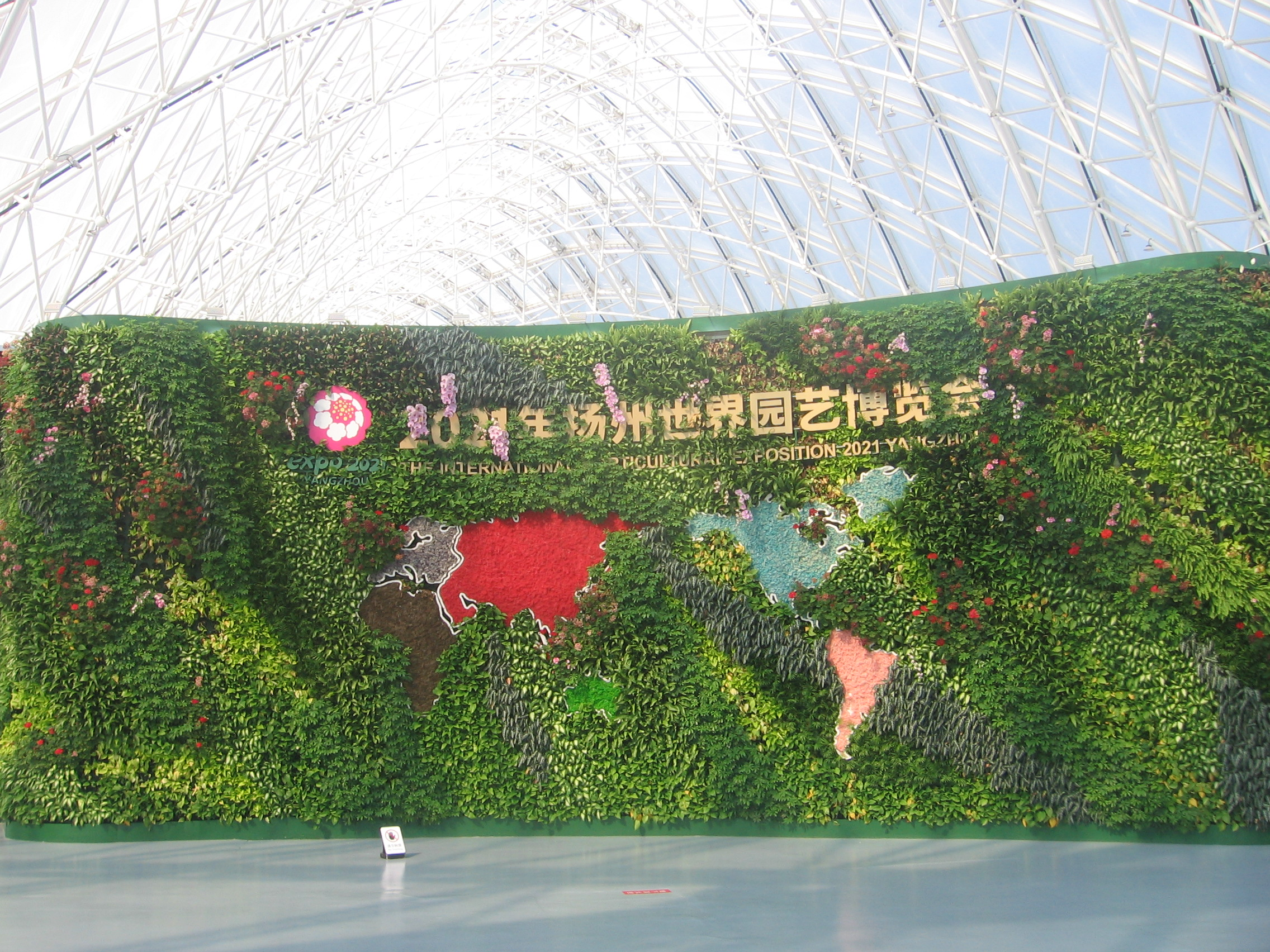

Overview
- BIE-class: Unrecognized exposition
- Name: Expo 2021 Yangzhou
- Motto: Green City, Healthy Life

Location
- Country: China
- City: Yangzhou, Jiangsu

Timeline
- Opening: 8 April 2021
- Closure: 8 October 2021

Internet
- Website: 2021expo-yangzhou.com (archived)

Expo 2021 Yangzhou, officially the Yangzhou International Horticultural Exposition 2021 (Chinese: 2021年扬州世界园艺博览会) is an A2/B1 class AIPH horticultural exhibition, held in Yangzhou, China from 8 April to 8 October 2021. The theme of the expo is "Green City, Healthy Life".
