= Expo 2014 =

Horticultural exhibition

Logo of the Qingdao International Horticultural Exposition

Expo 2014 Qingdao, officially the Qingdao International Horticultural Exposition 2014 (Chinese: 2014青岛世界园艺博览会) was a horticultural exhibition recognized by the International Association of Horticultural Producers (as AIPH class A2/B1) in Qingdao, China. It was held from April 25 to October 25 in Baiguo Mountain Park of Licang District. The motto of the exhibition was: "From the earth, for the Earth".

== Mascot ==
The mascot is named “Qingqing”. The mascot's blue-green colour (青 qīng) represents the old Chinese saying that: "blue-green comes from blue but is superior, as green has been added".

== Pavilions ==
Theme Pavilion

Botanical Pavilion

Science Pavilion
