= Internationale Gartenbauausstellung 2003 =

Horticultural exposition held in Germany

EXPO 2003 Rostock
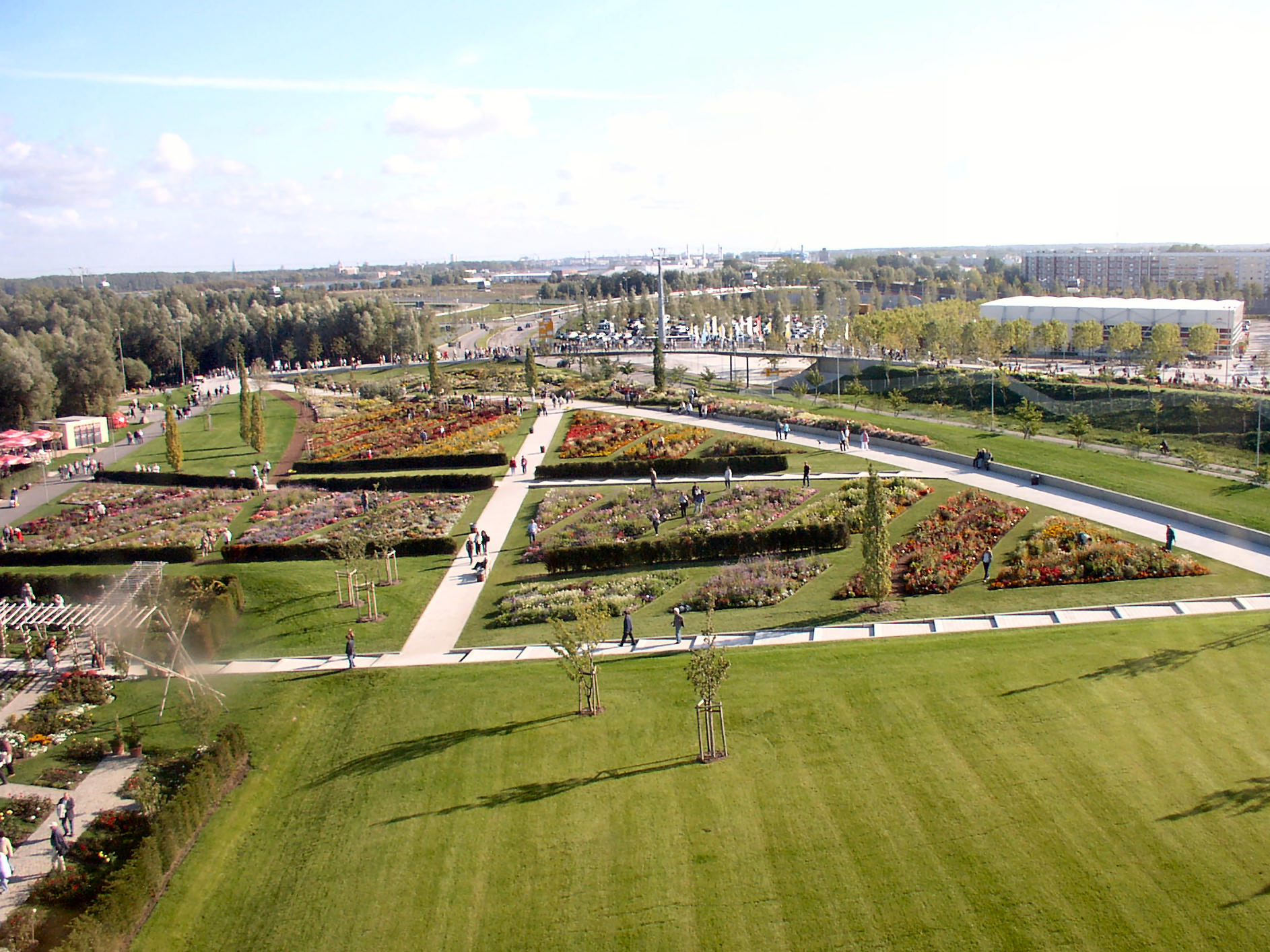
- The exhibition park IGA 2003

Overview
- BIE-class: Horticultural exposition
- Name: Internationale Gartenbauausstellung 2003
- Building(s): Willow church
- Visitors: 2.630.000

Location
- Country: Germany
- City: Rostock
- Venue: Schmarl
- Coordinates: 54°08′23″N 12°04′46″E

Timeline
- Opening: April 25, 2003
- Closure: October 12, 2003

Horticultural expositions
- Previous: Expo 2002 in Haarlemmermeer
- Next: Expo 2006 in Chiang Mai

Specialized expositions
- Previous: Expo '98 in Lisbon
- Next: Expo 2008 in Zaragoza

Universal expositions
- Previous: Expo 2000 in Hanover
- Next: Expo 2005 in Aichi

The Internationale Gartenbauausstellung 2003 was organized in the City of Rostock in Germany. It was the 17th international horticultural exposition which was recognized by the Bureau International des Expositions. The park was created in a derelict area around ruins of the former village of Schmarl, on the banks of the river Warnow. This made it possible to have a connection between water and gardens.

== The project IGA 2003 ==
The project included World Horticultural Exposition as well as the construction of access roads to the newly built Warnow Tunnel, the development of a new trade fair and congress centre, the integration of the historical ship Frieden as a wharf museum, the reuse of the park after the exhibition, and improvements to Rostock's infrastructure.

== Participating countries ==
Thirty-two countries were represented with a national garden: Austria, Bolivia, Bulgaria, China, Colombia, Croatia, Finland, France, Greece, Germany, Hungary, India, Indonesia, Italy, Japan, Kenya, Latvia, Luxembourg, Mauritania, Netherlands, North Korea, Pakistan, Poland, Slovakia, Spain, South Africa, South Korea, Switzerland, Tanzania, Tunisia, United Arab Emirates, and Vietnam.

== Financials ==
The preparation and furnishing of the terrain cost 62 million euros, the trade fair 32 million euros. The bills were paid by the City of Rostock, the State Mecklenburg-Vorpommern and the German federal government. 2.63 million people visited the exposition. The IGA 2003 met expectations as an attraction for holiday makers and tourists. More than half of the visitors came from outside Mecklenburg-Vorpommern and one third stayed in Rostock overnight, resulting in 50 million euros extra sales in this region. Despite this result the exposition closed with a deficit of 20 million euros due to lack of supervision by the authorities.

== Events ==
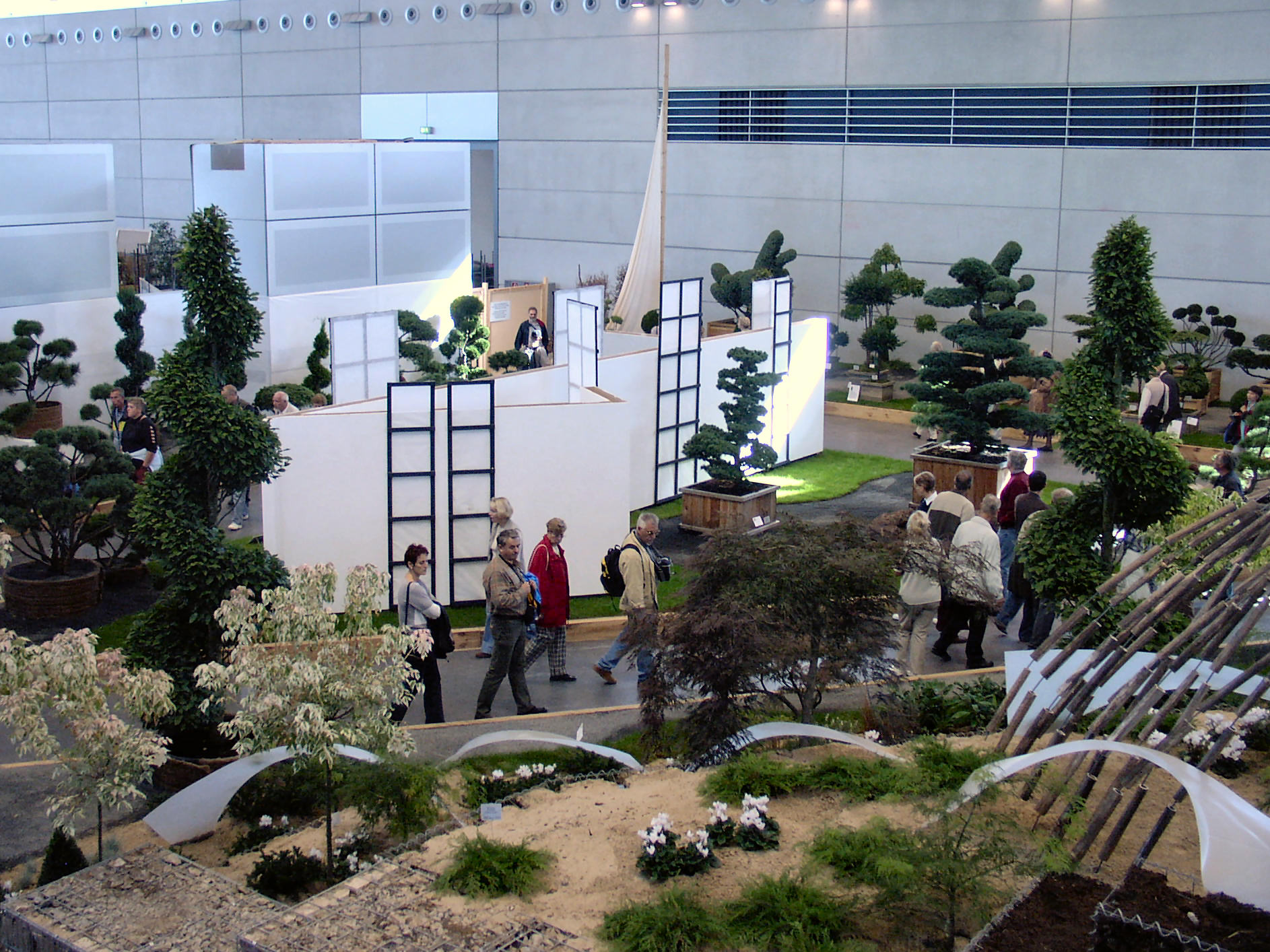
Inside the trade fair

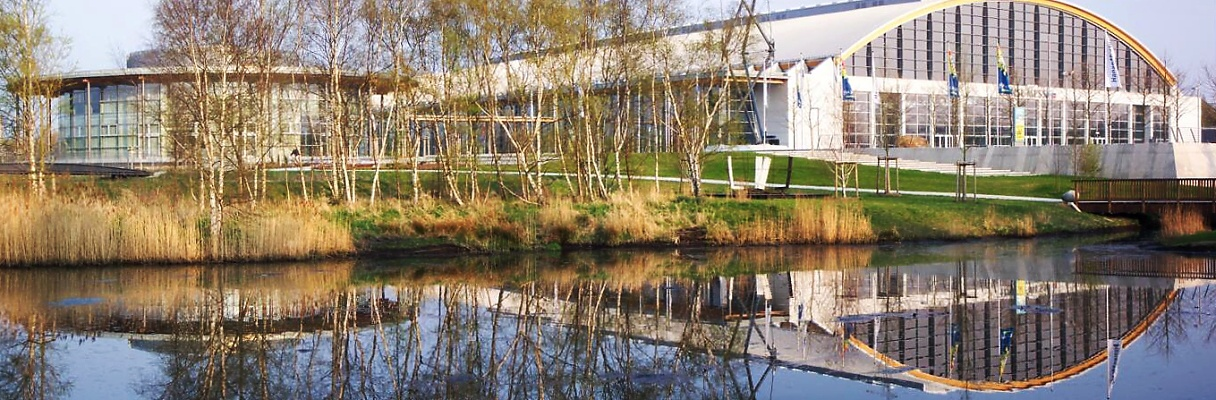
Tradefair and Rotunda

During the IGA 2003, a total of 17,000 visitors attended 275 different meetings and congresses. 32 countries were represented with their own national gardens, and 20 of them got extra attention on the Nationentage. Visitors liked the national gardens, the aerial cable car, the floating garden, and the 25 alternating displays in the trade fair.

Several outdoor events, totalling 1361 on 171 days, were held in the park. The main contributors were the Rostocker Volkstheater with 50 events, and the broadcaster NDR with their Open-Air-Veranstaltungen.

== Willow Church ==
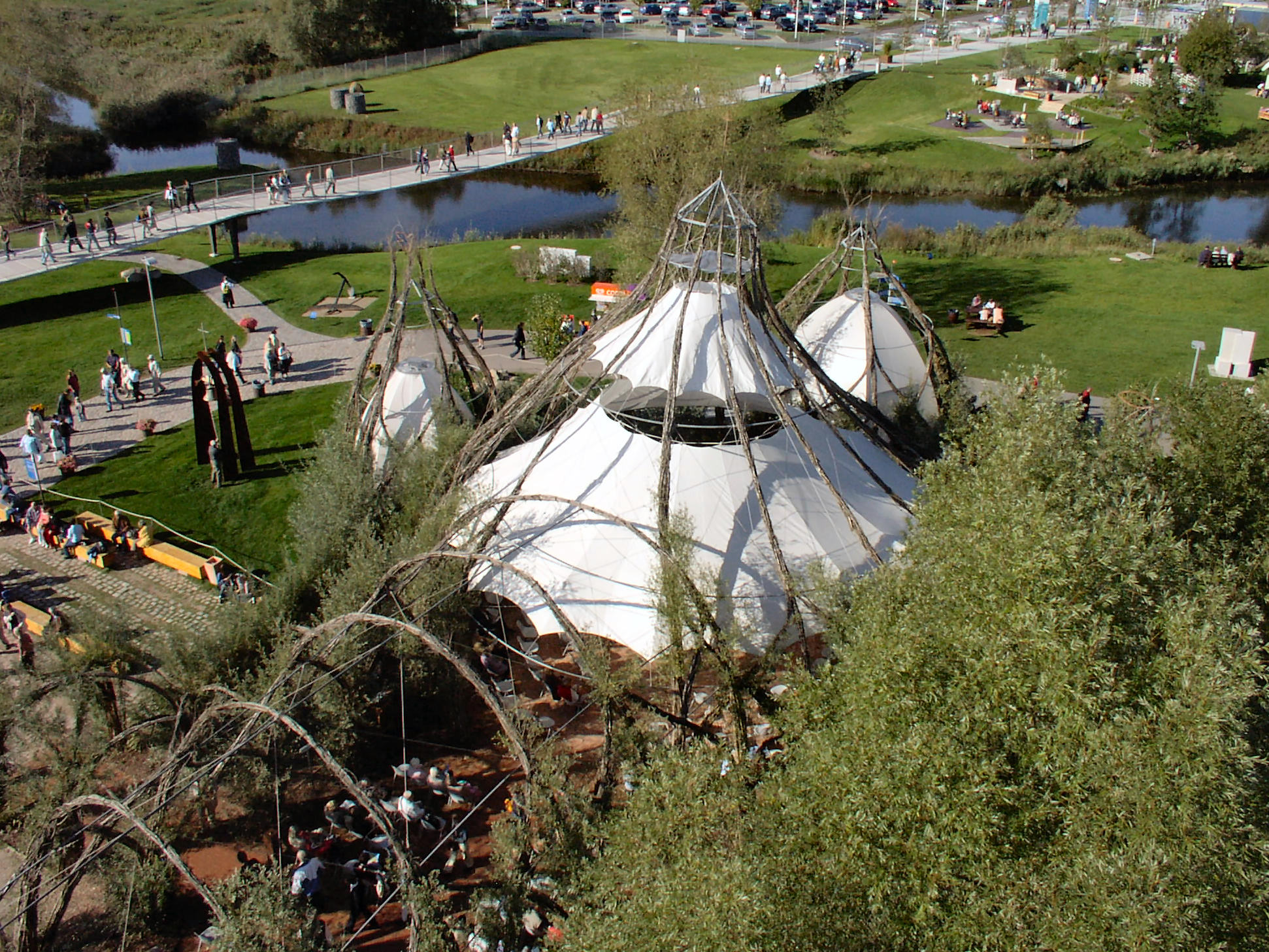
Willow church

An architectural experiment was the Willow Church constructed during the preparations for the IGA 2003. It was the biggest living building of the world. The dome was 15 meters high and the church was 52 meters long. The building was designed by architect Marcel Kalberer, who also led the construction. 650 volunteers from 13 countries started building in 2001. 50 volunteers at the same time lived at a camp to knot and bundle the willow branches and set up the self-supporting construction. During the IGA an average of 300 visitors attended the mass on Sundays. 250 services took place, 3 of them marriages and 6 baptisms.

== Reuse ==
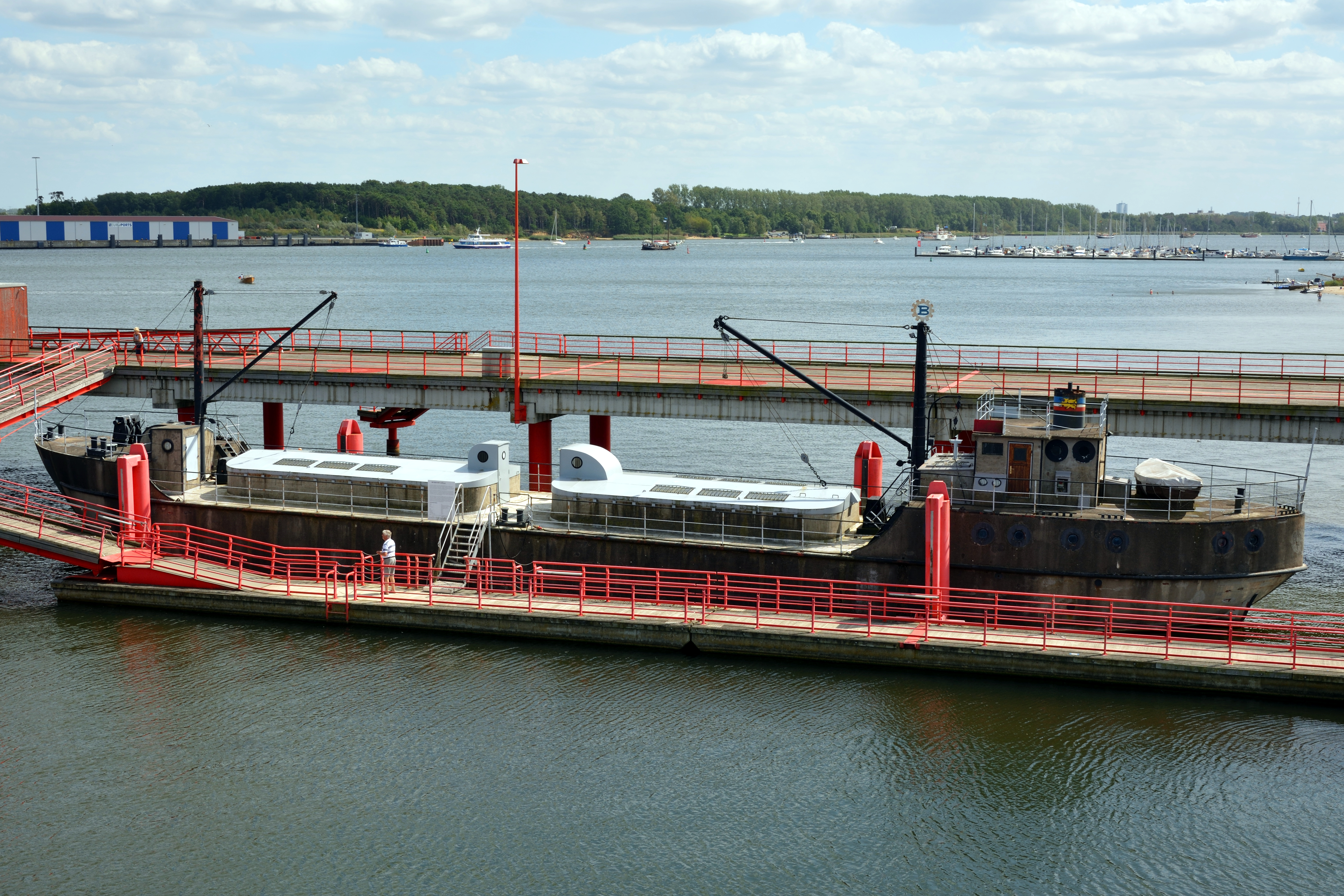
Concrete ship Capella at the Warnow's embankment

All park facilities and a part of the national gardens were retained and can still be visited. Access to the park however is restricted by a fence, its location outside the city and the entrance fares. The stage in the park and the Willow Church are still in use. The trade fair appears to be a financial burden for the city that still has to pay for the losses.
