= Fürstenrieder Straße =

Street in Munich, Germany

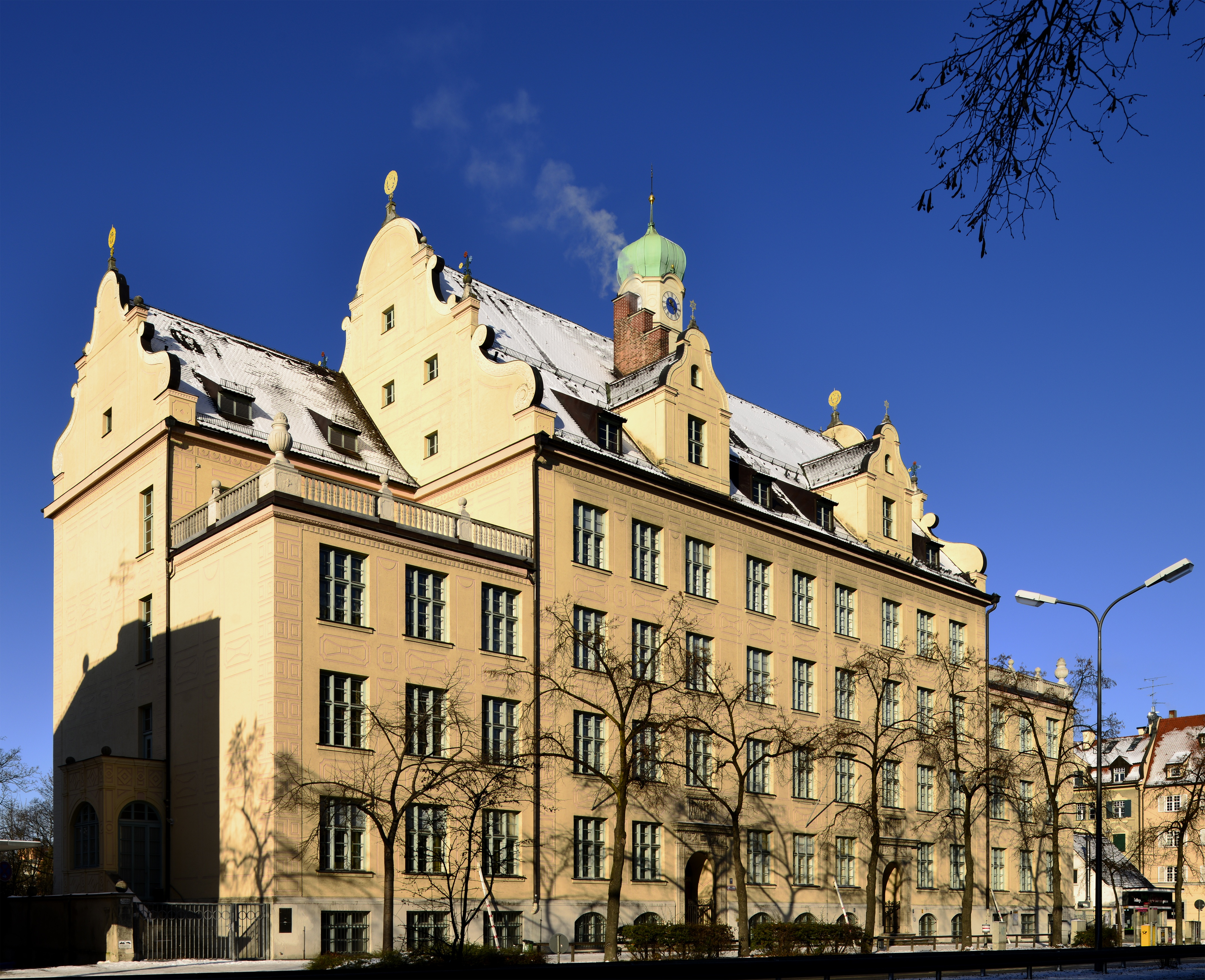
Schoolhouse on the Fürstenrieder Straße

The Fürstenrieder Straße is an almost five-kilometer-long important inner-city connecting road in Munich, Germany. It is named after the Fürstenried Palace, which lies near its southern end.

== Route ==
The Fürstenrieder Straße leads through the districts of Laim, Sendling-Westpark and Hadern to the northern edge of Fürstenried and forms a section of the only partially completed Outer Ring. Over almost its entire length it is made up of six-lanes with a green central strip. It is also part of the shortest inner-city connection between the Bundesautobahn 8 (Westast) and the Bundesautobahn 95.

The road starts at Landsberger Straße in Laim as the southern continuation of Wotanstraße. It runs in a straight line to the south, crosses Agnes-Bernauerstraße and Gotthardstraße and crosses the Bundesautobahn 96 at junction 38. It passes close to Westpark, from which it is separated only by several school buildings (Erasmus-Grasser-Gymnasium, Ludwigsgymansium). It then passes Waldfriedhof to the east. It crosses under the Bundesautobahn 95 leading into the city at exit 2 Kreuzhof and changes there into Boschetsrieder Straße and therefore into a west-eastern tangential road of the Outer Ring.

== History ==
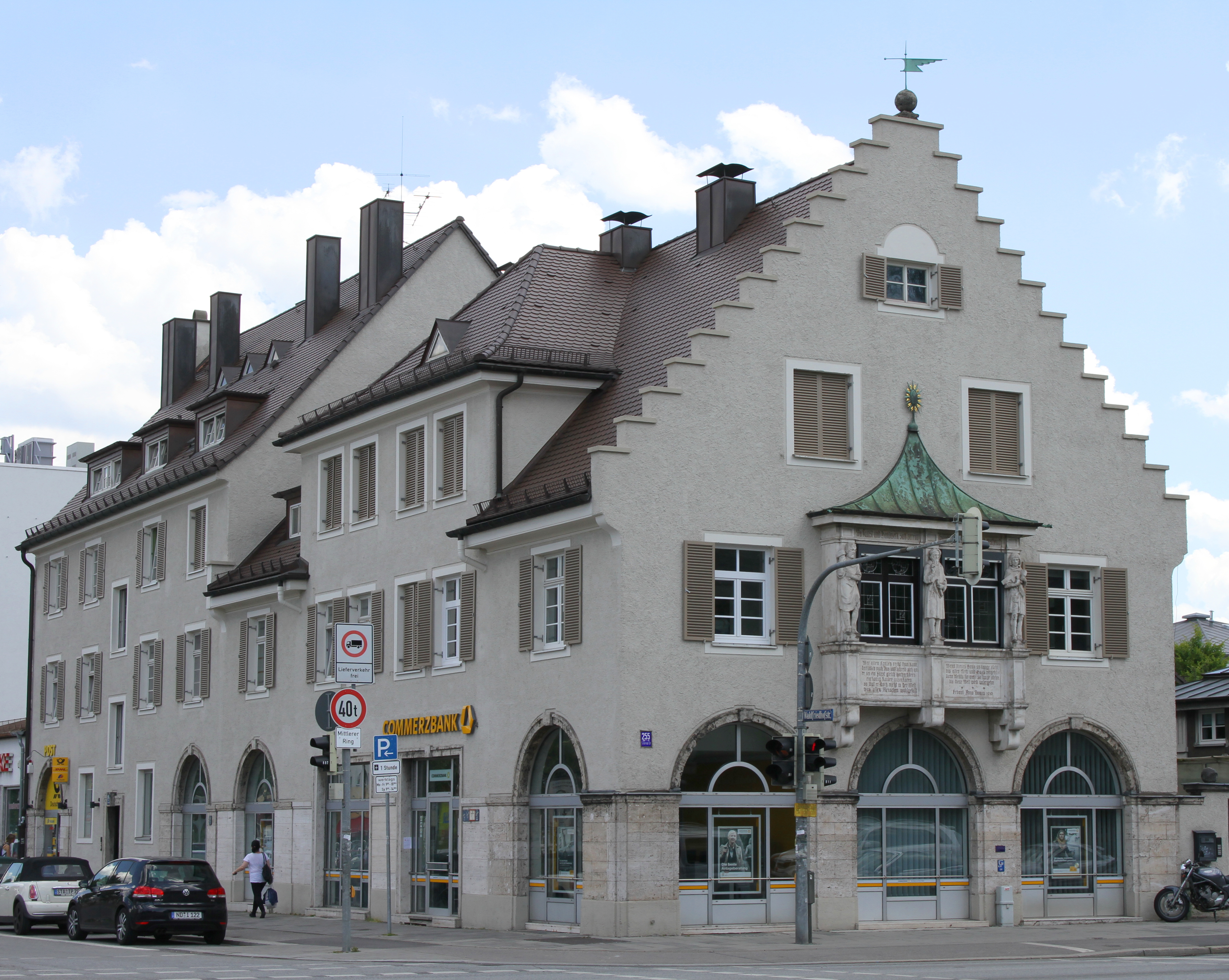
Fürstenrieder Straße 255

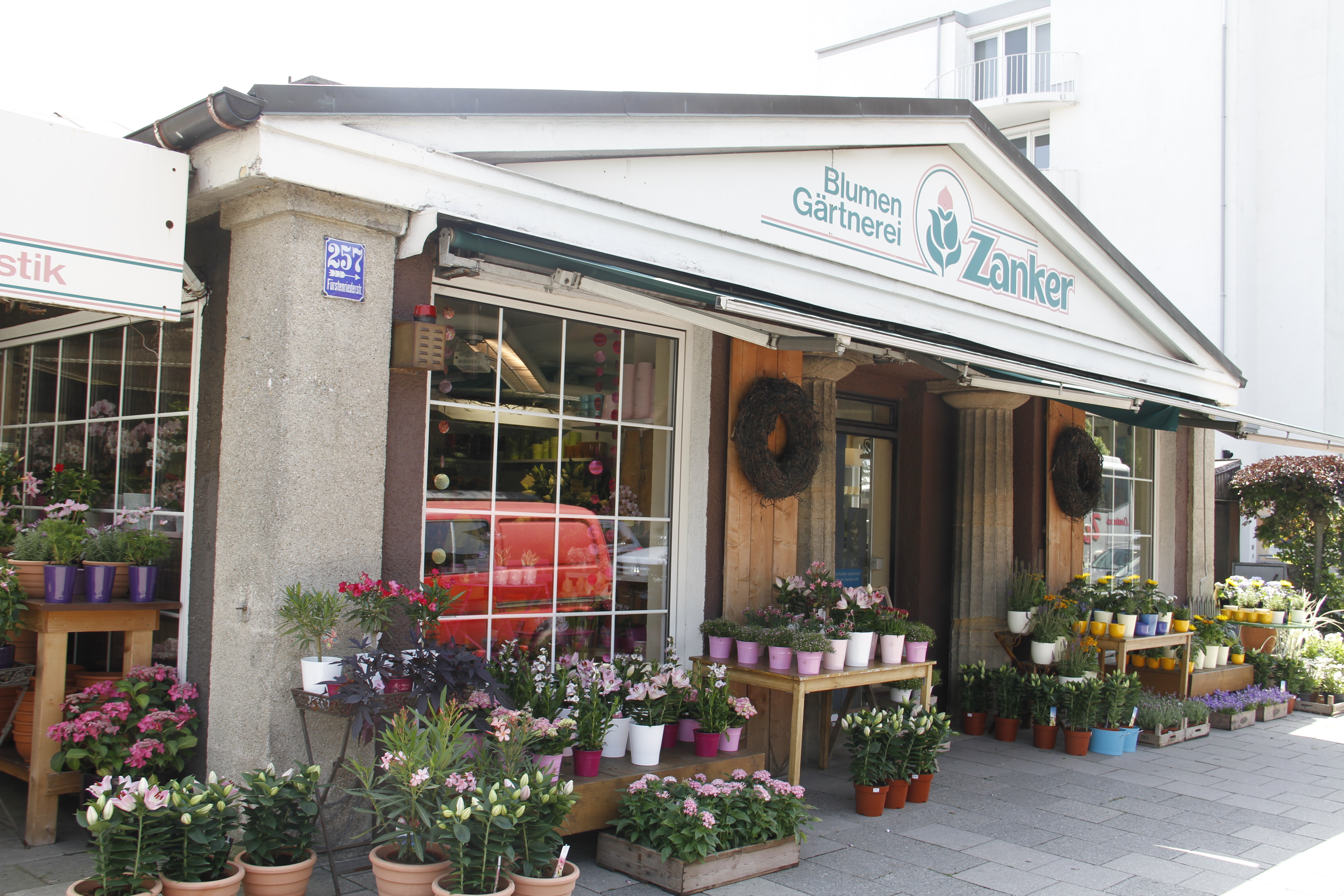
Fürstenrieder Straße 257

The current route of Fürstenrieder Straße used to be an alleyway connecting Nymphenburg Palace and Fürstenried Palace. The expansion into an inner-city main road already began in the 1950s before the Munich General Traffic Plan was drawn up in 1963, in which it was included as part of the Tangente 5-West.

From 1948 to 1966, a trolleybus line ran through the Fürstenrieder Straße (until 1961 as line O32).

Since 2005, the construction of a tram in Fürstenrieder Straße has been the subject of controversial discussion, and the timetable for its implementation is still open.

== See also ==
- Fürstenrieder Straße 255
- Fürstenrieder Straße 257
