= Fürstenrieder Straße 257 =

Historical building in Munich, Germany

Coordinates: 48.1117°N 11.5027°E

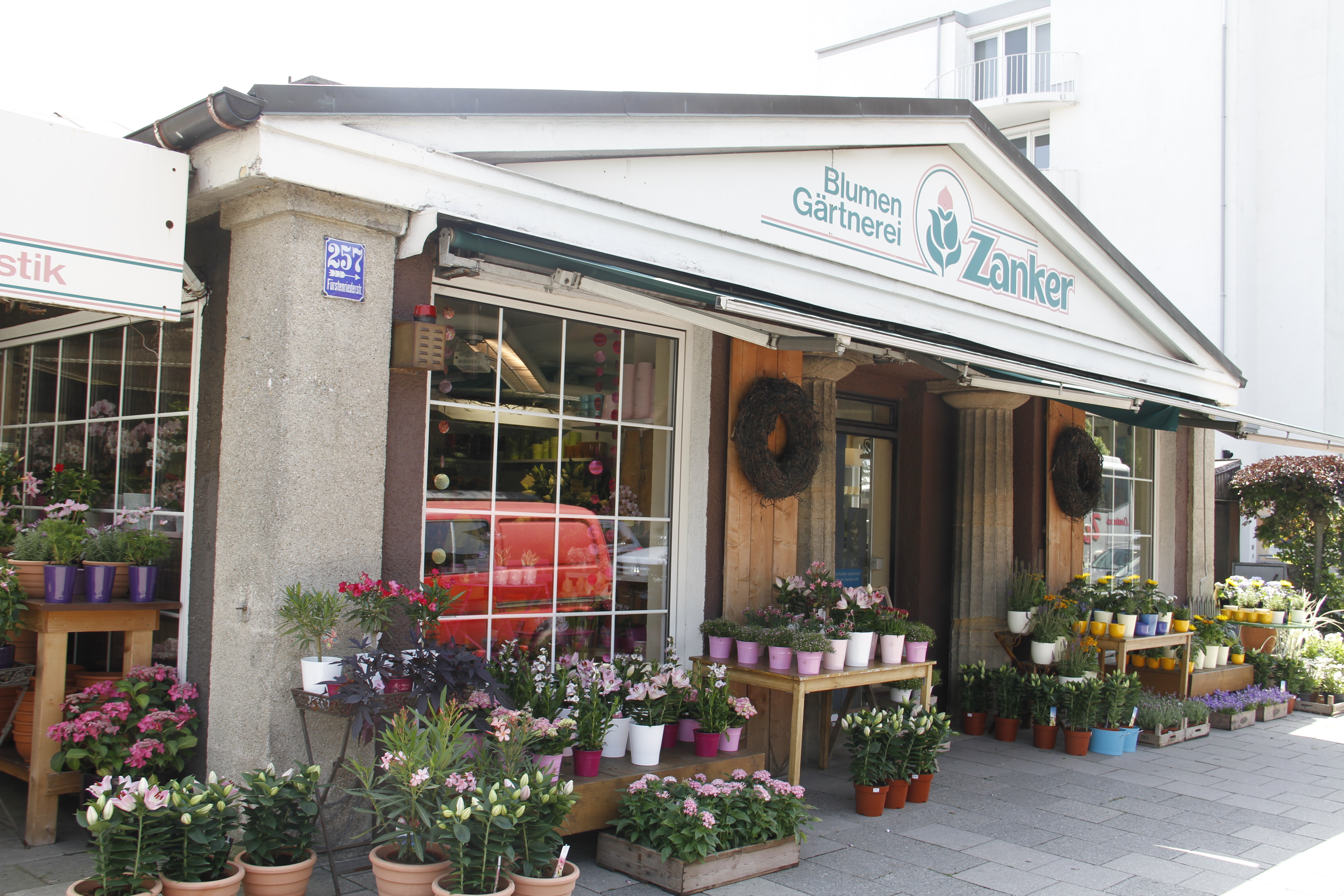
Fürstenrieder Straße 257, street facade

Fürstenrieder Straße 257 is a small residential and commercial building in Munich, Germany. It is registered as a historical building in the Bayerische Denkmalliste.

== Description ==
The house is located in the Munich district Sendling-Westpark opposite the Waldfriedhof, slightly south of the intersection Fürstenrieder Straße / Waldfriedhofstraße. It was built in 1927 by Wilhelm Born and served as a workshop and office for the Munich gravestone sculptor Georg Halbich, who also owned the neighbouring property at Fürstenrieder Straße 255.

The building is an elongated one-storey building with a flat saddle roof. The central part is raised like a pavilion and carries a tent roof. The narrow side on Fürstenrieder Straße has a classifying façade with a wide triangular gable. The entrance door is flanked by two Doric columns.
