= Boschetsrieder Straße =

Street in Munich, Germany

Coordinates: 48.0989°N 11.5197°E

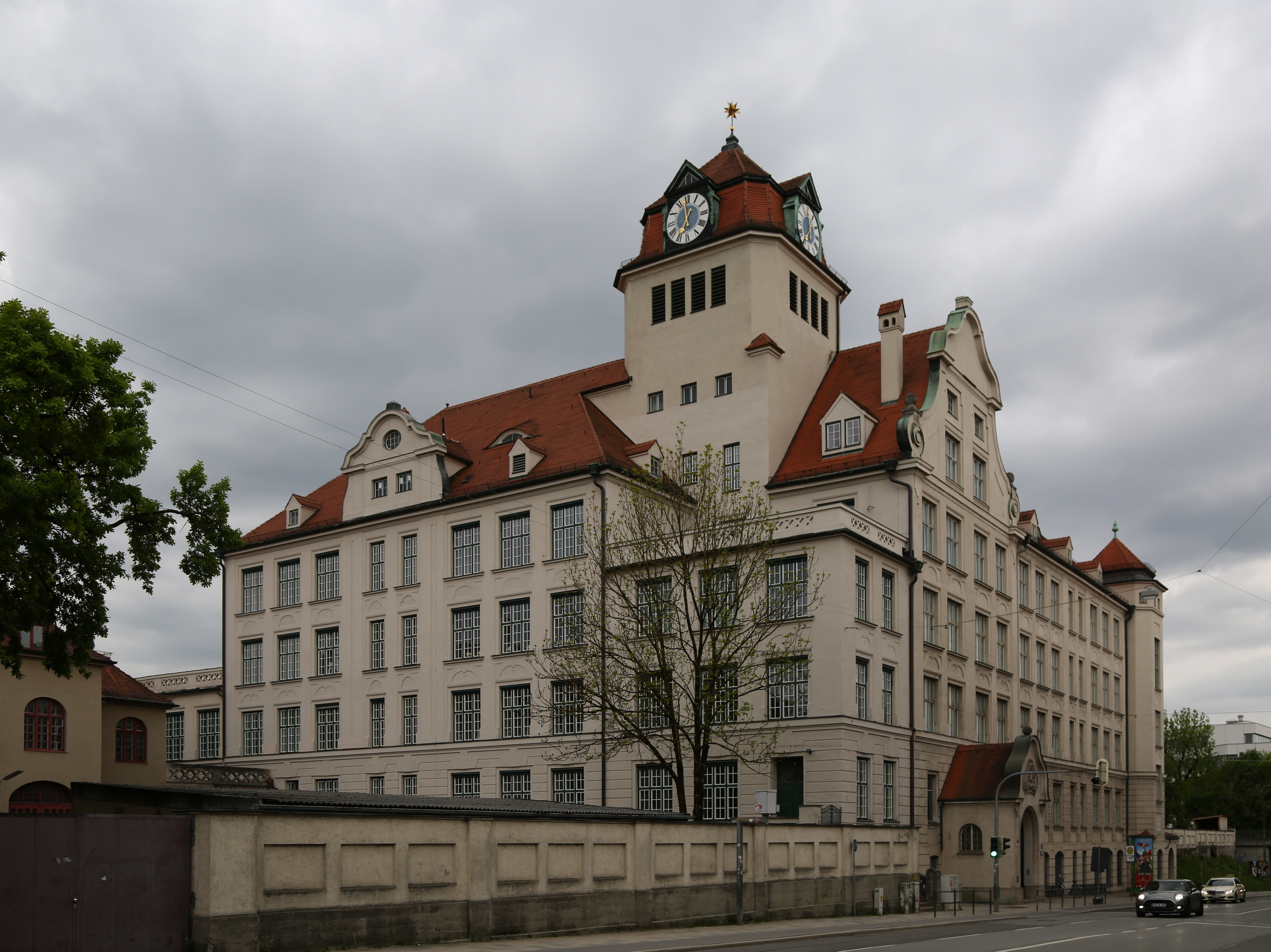
Primary school Boschetsrieder Straße

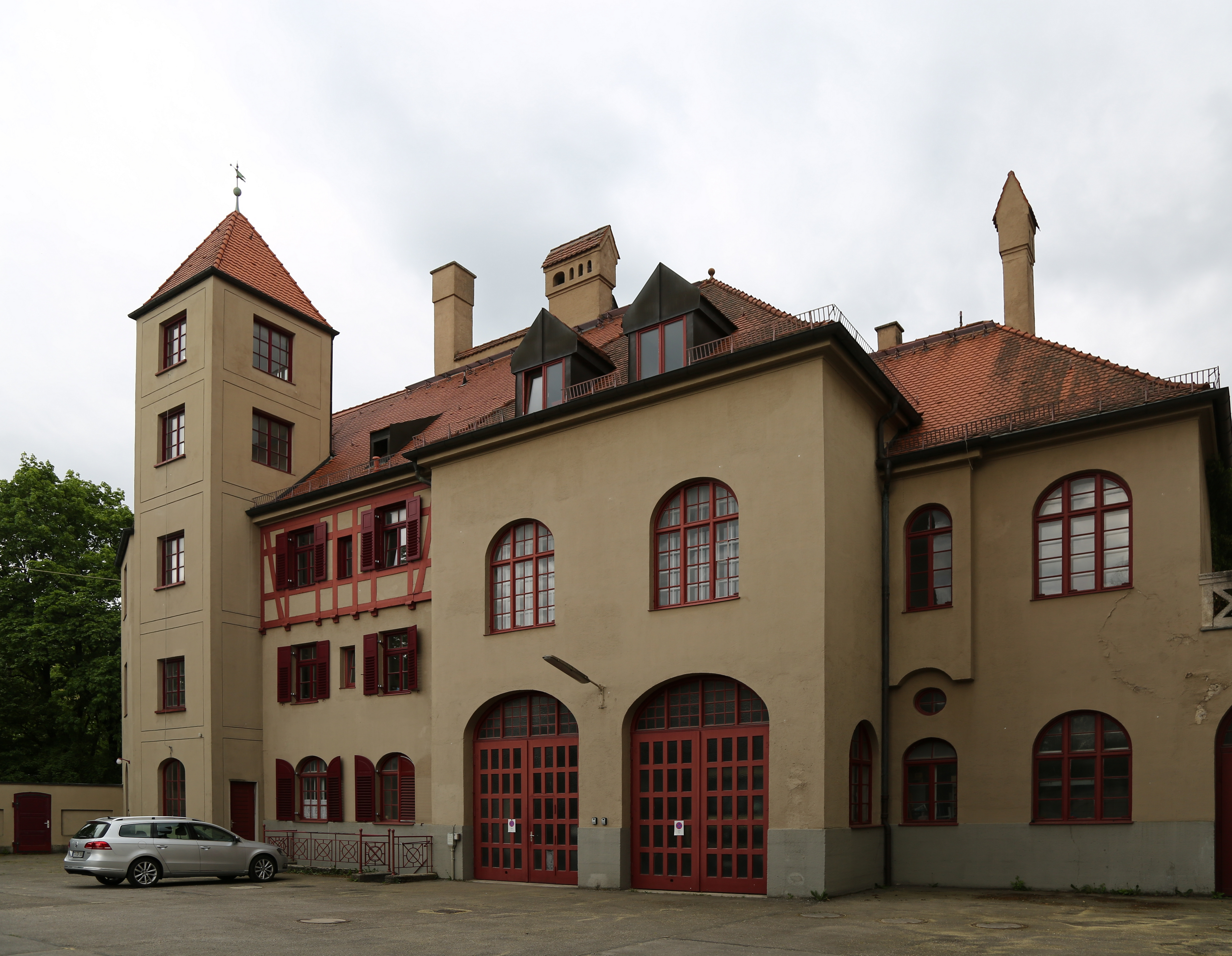
Former fire station Sendling

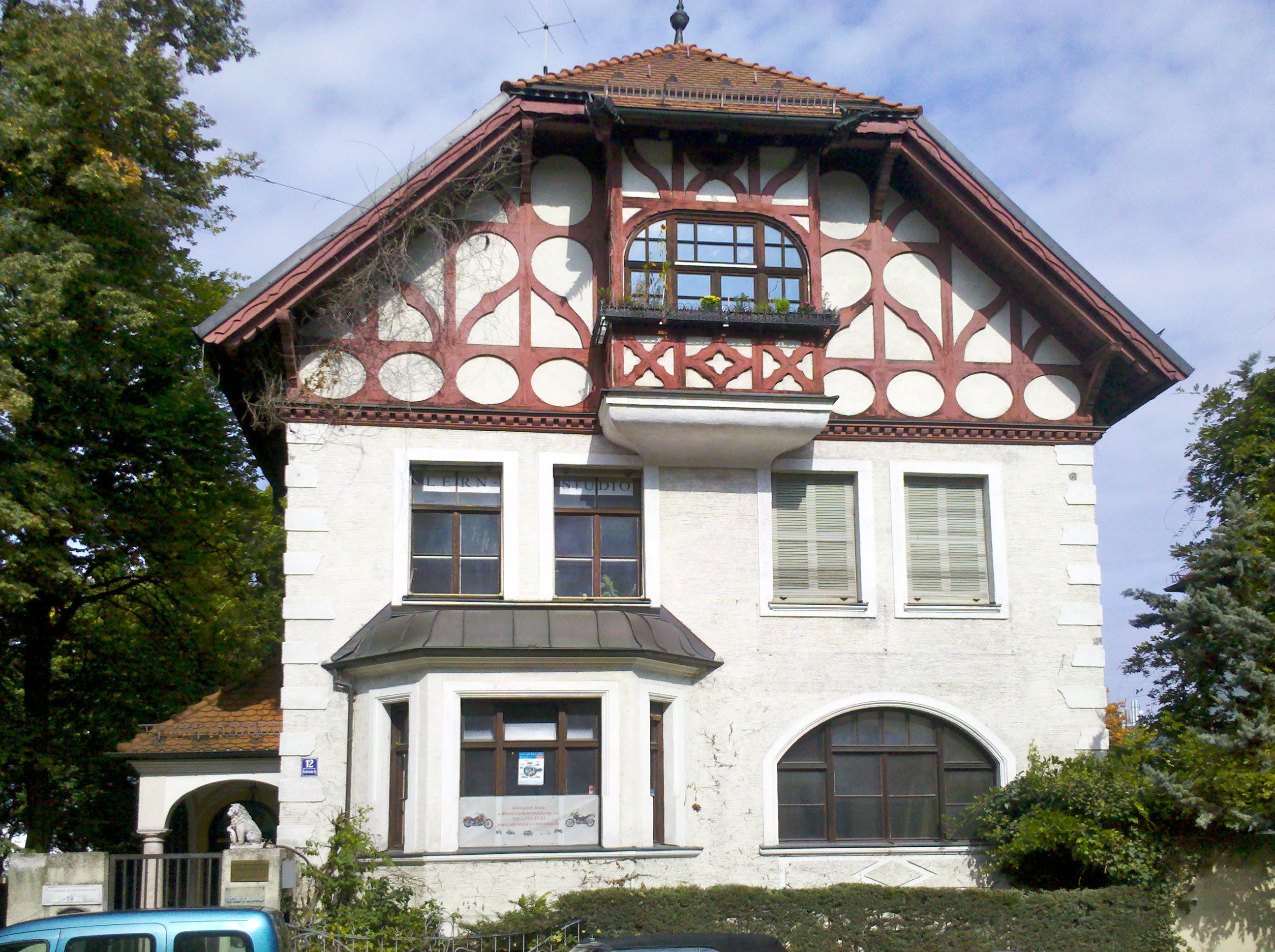
Country house Boschetsrieder Straße 12, architect Max Littmann, 1898

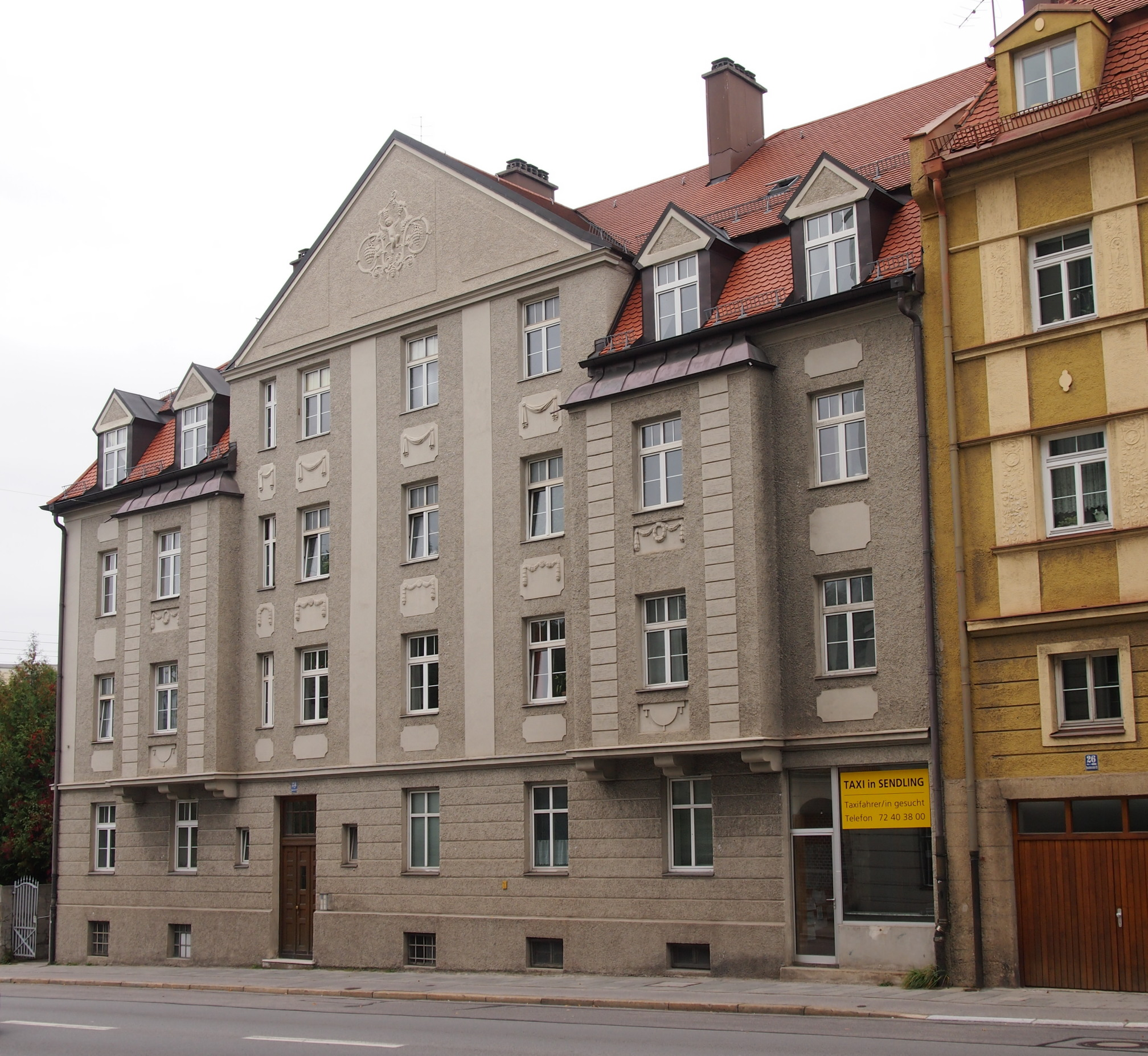
Rental unit Boschetsrieder Straße 28, architect Carl Evora, 1912/13

Boschetsrieder Straße is an inner city street in the Munich districts of Thalkirchen, Obersendling and Forstenried/Am Waldfriedhof, which runs west from Bundesstraße 11 (Plinganser-/Wolfratshauser Straße) on the Isar hillside to Kreuzhof, where it continues as the Fürstenrieder Straße.

== Building development ==
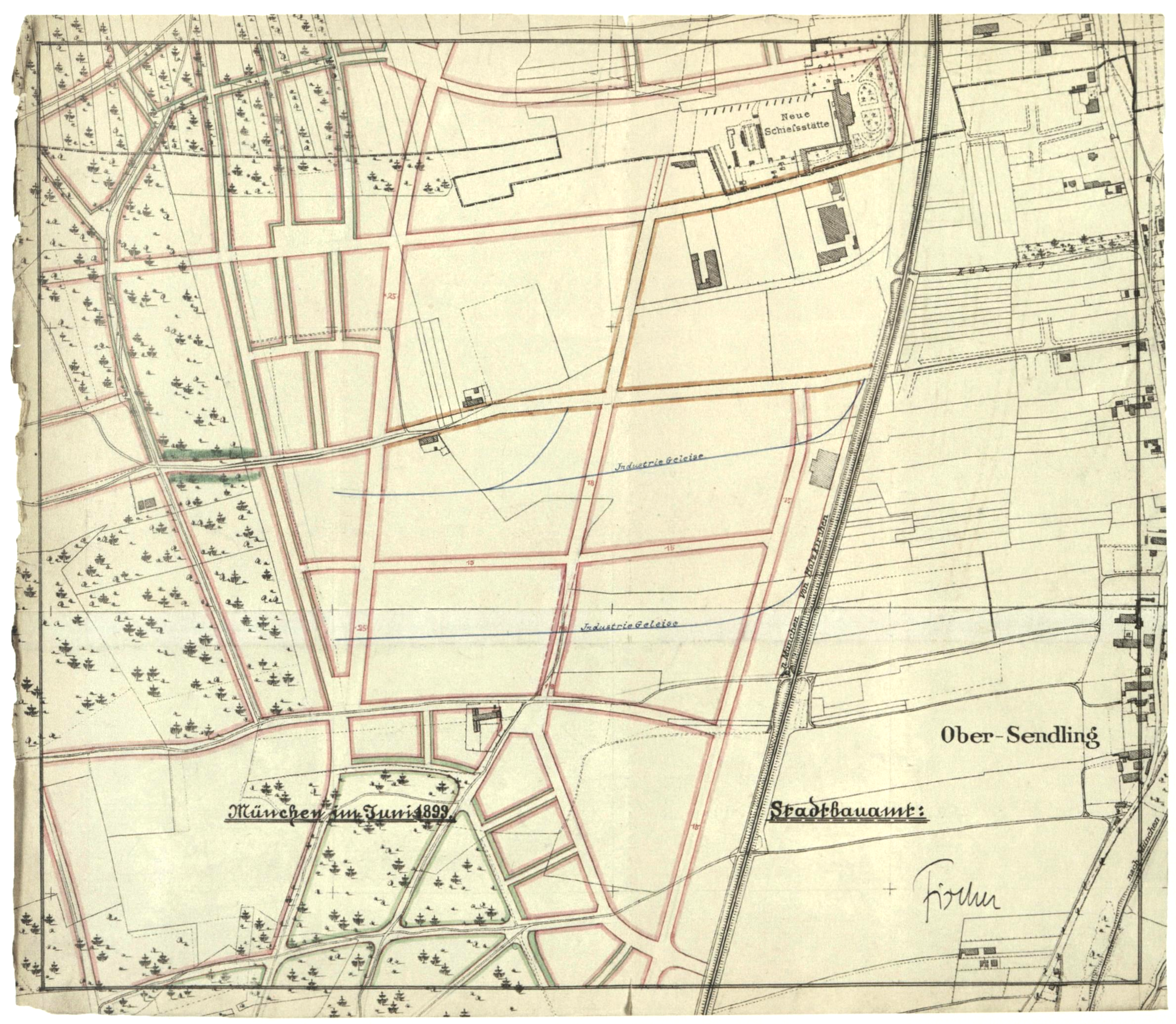
Planning of Boschetsrieder Straße, hand drawn by Theodor Fischer 1899

For the expansion of the industrial area Obersendling of the Isarwerke in 1899, the chief board member of the Munich city expansion department, Theodor Fischer, designed a road network. In 1901 it was named Poschetsried after the former Hofmark (demarcated district of a manorial dominion) Poschetsried. Poschetsried, also known as Boschetsried, had emerged from the clearing of a farmer named Barschalk in the early 10th century and has been documented to be in the procession from the von Hörwarth family since 1593. From 1703, they renovated the seat there, which later became Fürstenried Palace of the House of Wittelsbach.

The eastern end of Boschetsrieder Straße between the slope edge and the Maximiliansbahn was to be built with residential buildings for the workers of the industrial area. In anticipation, architect Robert Rehlen built a primary school in 1903/04 in a compact Art Nouveau style on a largely open field. In accordance with the pedagogical and social concept of the Georg Kerschensteiner municipal school council, the school was equipped with classrooms, rooms for technical training and facilities for the entire neighbourhood. Therefore, children's bath, a children's home and a social centre were integrated into the school building. Together with the school, Rehlen also built the neighbouring fire station.

The construction of the workers housing estate was however delayed, so that individual country houses and villas could be built on Boschetsrieder Straße; it was not until 1905 that construction began on the first of, mostly four-story apartment buildings, which, however, remained patchy until the Second World War.

To the west of the railway underpass and as far as Ratzingerplatz at the junction with Murnauer Straße, the commercial and residential buildings were mingled together. Remarkable were the buildings of Munich's largest consumers' co-operative in the southeast corner of Ratzingerplatz, which were badly damaged during the war and subsequently demolished.

After the Second World War, gaps between buildings were closed, destroyed buildings were replaced and the western part of the street was built on for the first time. The post-war architecture characterizes the streetscape today. In 1952–54, the striking Siemens housing estate by architect Emil Freymuth was built on the north side of the western section. In the east, architect Walter Henn built a filigree workshop for the metal and precision engineering company Deckel AG on Tölzer Straße in 1958–60. Both building complexes are historically listed buildings Also in the east, the Protestant Passion Church by architect Fritz Zeitler was built in 1968 from an emergency church already built in 1933. The Thomas Mann Gymnasium (Munich) was built at the western end of the street in 1971/72.

== Transport and infrastructure ==
Boschetsrieder Straße initially only had local significance. This changed in 1911 when a tram line branched off from Plinganserstraße and led under the railway line to Hofmannstraße. It was used by Line 8, which became famous through the song of the same name by the folk singer Weiß Ferdl.

In 1946, Karl Meitinger, the architect and city planning councilor, presented the Munich city council with an internal plan for the reconstruction of the city, drawn up at the end of 1945, which also contained a chapter on arterial roads and ring roads. In it, he developed the concept of a central and an outer ring, both still within the urban area. Boschetsrieder Straße was intended to be part of the outer ring.

As part of the traffic expansion, Boschetsrieder Straße was included in Munich's only overhead line bus route from 1949. A further extension of this line over the slope edge into the Isar valley was still being prepared, but operation on this route never came to fruition.

In 1958, the Munich City Council adopted a general transport plan, which was incorporated into the first Munich urban development plan of 1963. From 1964, the tram, now line 16, was extended on Boschetsrieder Straße and continued as far as Fürstenried-West. It replaced the overhead line bus, which was finally discontinued in 1966.

The road itself, which previously led in a uniform width to the Kreuzhof roundabout, was extended from Hofmannstraße to four lanes with a wide central divider for the tram, and in the west was connected to the Garmischer Autobahn and Fürstenrieder Straße at the München-Kreuzhof exit without crossing. In the corner between Boschetsrieder Straße and the motorway lie the last preserved remains of the Sendlinger Forest, which were transformed into Südpark between 1960 and 1970.

In the northeast corner of Ratzingerplatz, the new Fire Station 2 of the Munich Fire Department was built in 1967 to replace the building that had become too small further east. This is the location of the fire brigade school for the entire Munich city area. In 1991, the tramway was also shut down because it was replaced by the newly opened underground line U3. This runs parallel to Boschetsrieder Straße a little to the south. The district is accessed by the three underground stations Obersendling, Aidenbachstraße and Machtlfinger Straße.

The systematic construction of the Outer Ring did not take place when, following protests against the reconstruction of the Altstadtring (Old Town Ring) and the Isar Parallel and extensive citizen participation from the mid-1960s onwards, the concept of the car-friendly city as the sole model for Munich's urban development was abandoned. For this reason, the slope edge of the Isar valley was not further developed. At the junction with the Bundesstraße 11 at the eastern end of the Boschetsrieder Straße, the two-lane Greinerberg leads downhill as a one-way street, and the much smaller Hoeckhstraße leads uphill, to which it can only be accessed at the base by a sharp curve.

== Plans ==
By far the largest user of the Obersendling industrial estate was the Hofmannstraße site of Siemens AG. It was completely abandoned by the company at the turn of the millennium. In line with Munich's economic development, the areas are being developed with apartments. The large site at the corner of Boschetsrieder Straße and Drygalski-Allee, which was intended for the company headquarters of Bayernwerk and later E.ON, has also been occupied by apartments since 2015. On the south side of Boschetsrieder Straße, between Ratzingerplatz and Machtlfinger Straße, other large Siemens buildings stand empty or are insufficiently filled by interim uses.

Ratzingerplatz is characterised by the areas of the turning loop, which has not been used since the end of the tramway, as well as by the oversized road areas with regard to traffic. In 2008, it was voted "Munich's ugliest square" in a survey of readers of the Munich Abendzeitung. As part of the plans for the western tangent of the tramway, the western part of Boschetsrieder Straße is to be used by the tram again. The planned terminus is the subway station Aidenbachstraße at Ratzingerplatz.

The former consumer site on the square, which had been abandoned shortly after the Second World War, is to be developed with a school centre around 2020. The Ratzingerplatz itself is to be redesigned by moving all lanes to the south side. In the north of the square, another row of buildings could be built to complete the picture of the square.
