= Thomas Mann Gymnasium =

Thomas Mann Gymnasium may refer to the following schools:

- Thomas Mann Gymnasium (Budapest), Hungary
- Thomas Mann Gymnasium (Munich), Germany, on Boschetsrieder Straße
- Thomas Mann Gymnasium (Stutensee), Germany, in Stutensee
