= Turgay Ateş =

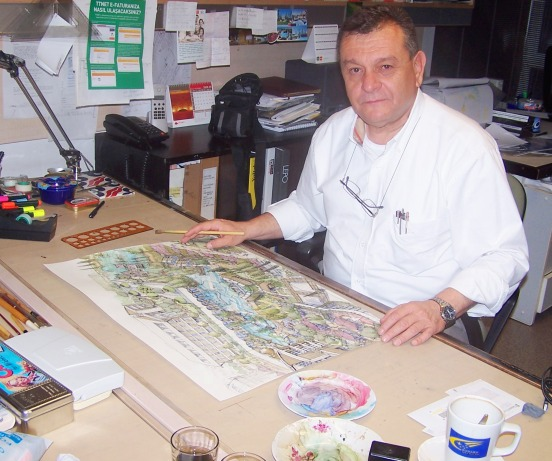
- Born: 1948
- Died: 2016 (aged 67–68)
- Occupation: Architect

Veli Turgay Ateş also known as Veli Türkay Ateş (1948 – October 16, 2016) was a Turkish city and urban planner and landscape architect.

He graduated from the METU Faculty of Architecture (Department of City and Regional Planning) in 1973, earned his MA degree in 1978, and his doctorate in 1985 from the University of Ankara.

Between 1976 and 1995, he lectured part-time on urban design, landscape architecture and advanced design graphics at METU, University of Ankara, and Bilkent University. He was the chief planner of Pioneer projects for Turkey during his duty as a consultant of the Mayor of Ankara between 1978-1980 such as the Batıkent Housing Project (200,000 residents), the Pedestrianization Project of Kızılay Central district, and the bus-priority system for Ankara.

He has gold and silver medals for Turkish Gardens which were designed by him for the International Garden Festival at Liverpool (IGF 84) and International Garden Expo 83 at Munich (IGA 83). At national competitions between 1972-1985 he won many prizes.

Since 1985 he completed over 150 landscaping and urban design projects including 5 star hotels, marinas, urban bridges, seafronts and private gardens.

== Professional Experience ==
- 1970-1971: Researcher, designer, draftsman in the office of architect Behruz Çİnİcİ
- 1971-1972: Researcher and planner in the office of architect Yavuz Taşçi
- 1972-1974: Private office
- 1974-1976: City Planning projects with Dr. İrem Acaroğlu
- 1976-1978: Planner at the Bank of Provinces
- 1976-2001: Part-time instructor in METU Department of City and Regional Planning
- 1978-1979: Consultant of the Mayor of Ankara chief Planner of Batıkent
- 1986-1986: Design manager of Dokap construction Elements Industries and Trade Co.
- 1987-2016: Member of Association of Turkish consulting architects and engineers (Member #144)
- 1990-1996: Instructor in Bilkent University Department of Interior Architecture and Environmental Design
- 1986-2016: Establishment of VISTA Planning office

== Competitions and Prizes ==
- 1970: İzmit Master Plan, Student member of the team, 1st mention
- 1972: Zonguldak Master Plan, Student member of the team, 1st mention
- 1973: Gaziantep Master Plan, Team leader, 1st purchase
- 1976: İzmit Coast Part and Fair, Team leader, 3rd prize
- 1979: Eskişehir Fair, Team leader, 4th prize
- 1982: Antalya Fair and Coast Park (Hotel Sheraton’s Site), Team leader, 3rd prize
- 1983: International Garden Exhibition, 3rd prize of the
- IGA 83 Munich, Turkish Garden German Government, Silver Medal from German
- IGF 84 Liverpool, England, International Garden Festival Grand prize of honour Turkish Garden, Large goldmedal (Turkish Garden) Gold Medal (Turkish Week)
- 1985: Adana Fevzi Çakmak Street, Team leader, 1st prize
- 1986: Ankara, Ulus Historical City Center reorganizing, planning competition, 1st prize
- 1987: Taksim Square Urban Design Competition, 2nd prize
- 1987: Bursa City Center Urban Design, and a multi-purposed building for commercial office and cultural uses - architectural competition, 3rd prize
