= Brudermühlstraße station =

Station of the Munich U-Bahn

Brudermühlstraße
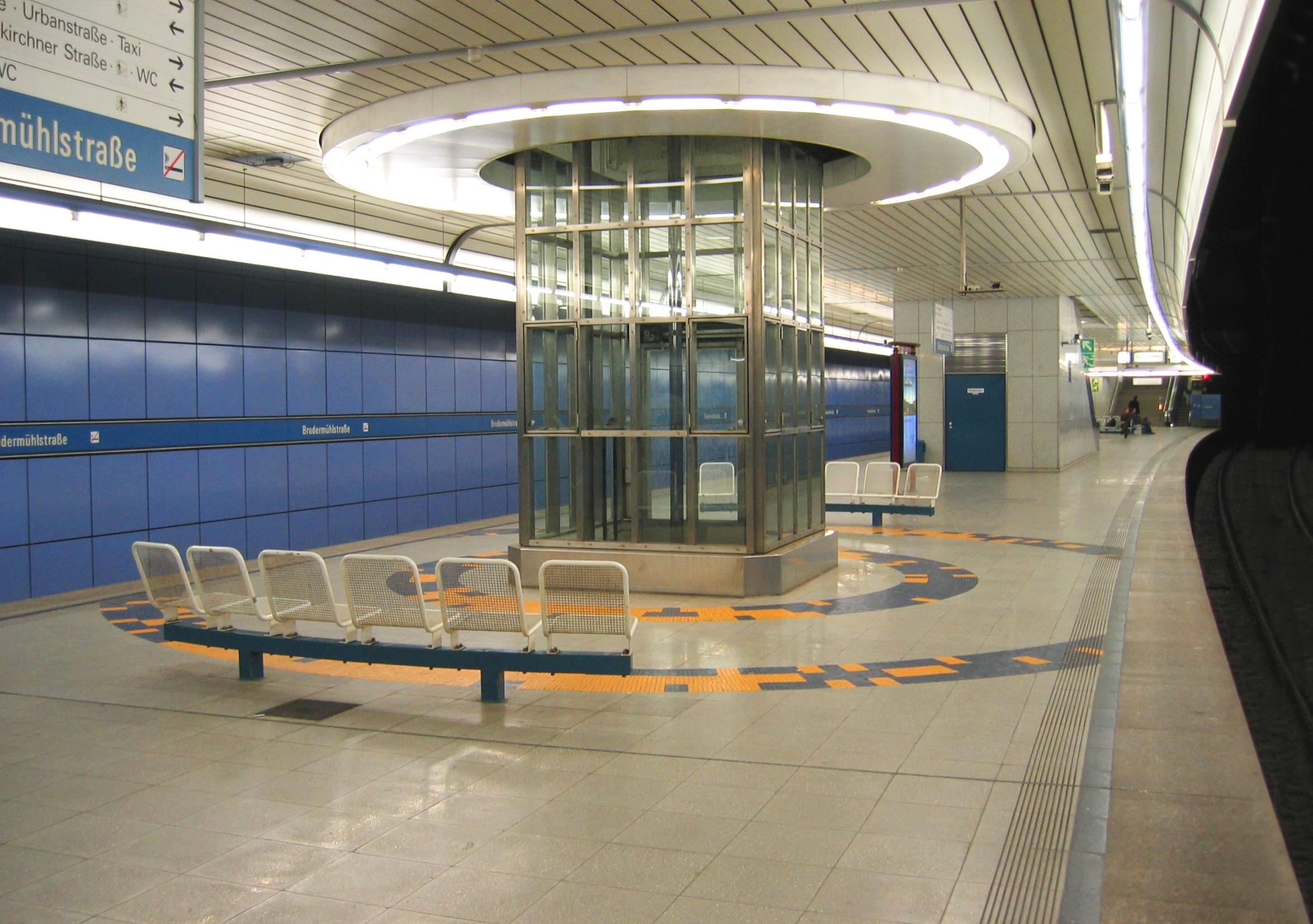

General information
- Location: Implerstraße at Brudermühlstraße, Sendling; Munich, Germany
- Coordinates: 48°06′44″N 11°32′56″E
- Platforms: Island platform
- Tracks: 2

Construction
- Structure type: Underground
- Accessible: Yes

Other information
- Fare zone: : M

History
- Opened: 28 October 1989

Services
Preceding station	Munich U-Bahn	Following station
Thalkirchen towards Fürstenried West	U3	Implerstraße towards Moosach
Location

Brudermühlstraße is an U-Bahn station in the Sendling suburb in Munich, Germany on the U3. The station is located below the Brüdermühlstraße, a part of Munich's Mittlerer Ring ring road system on a junction between the west-east Brüdermühlstraße and the north-south Implerstraße. The station is located 3.8 km southwest of the city centre and 2 km (25 minute walk) south of the Theresienwiese where Oktoberfest is held annually.

Marienplatz and Munich city centre is a 11-minute journey northbound on the U3 from Brudermühlstraße while southbound trains head towards Thalkirchen and eventually Fürstenried West. Trains run every 10 minutes or up to every 5 minutes in peak periods, very early and very late in the day at 20 or 30 minute interval.
