= Thalkirchen-Obersendling-Forstenried-Fürstenried-Solln =

Borough of Munich, Germany

Coordinates: 48.089°N 11.519°E

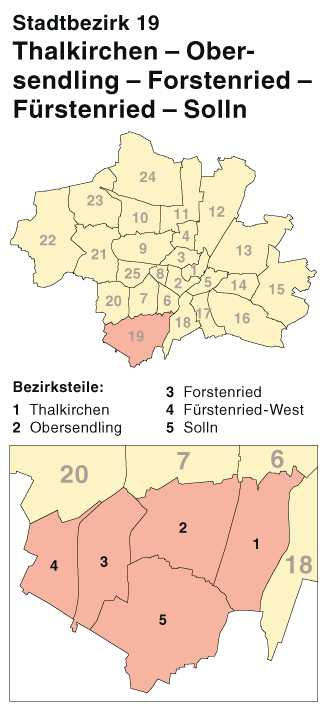
19th Borough, location within Munich

Thalkirchen-Obersendling-Forstenried-Fürstenried-Solln (German pronunciation: [taːlˈkɪʁçn̩ oːbɐˈzɛntlɪŋ ˈfɔʁstn̩ˌʁiːt ˈfʏʁstn̩ˌʁiːt ˈzɔl̩n]; Central Bavarian: Thoikircha-Obasendling-Forstnriad-Fiastnriad-Soin) is the 19th borough of Munich, Germany, comprising the extreme southern part of the city on the west bank of the river Isar. After the administrative reform, the boroughs Thalkirchen-Obersendling-Forstenried and Solln were incorporated, thus forming the new borough. It comprises 17.7631 square kilometres and has a population of 96,714 residents (as of 2018).

== Subdivisions ==
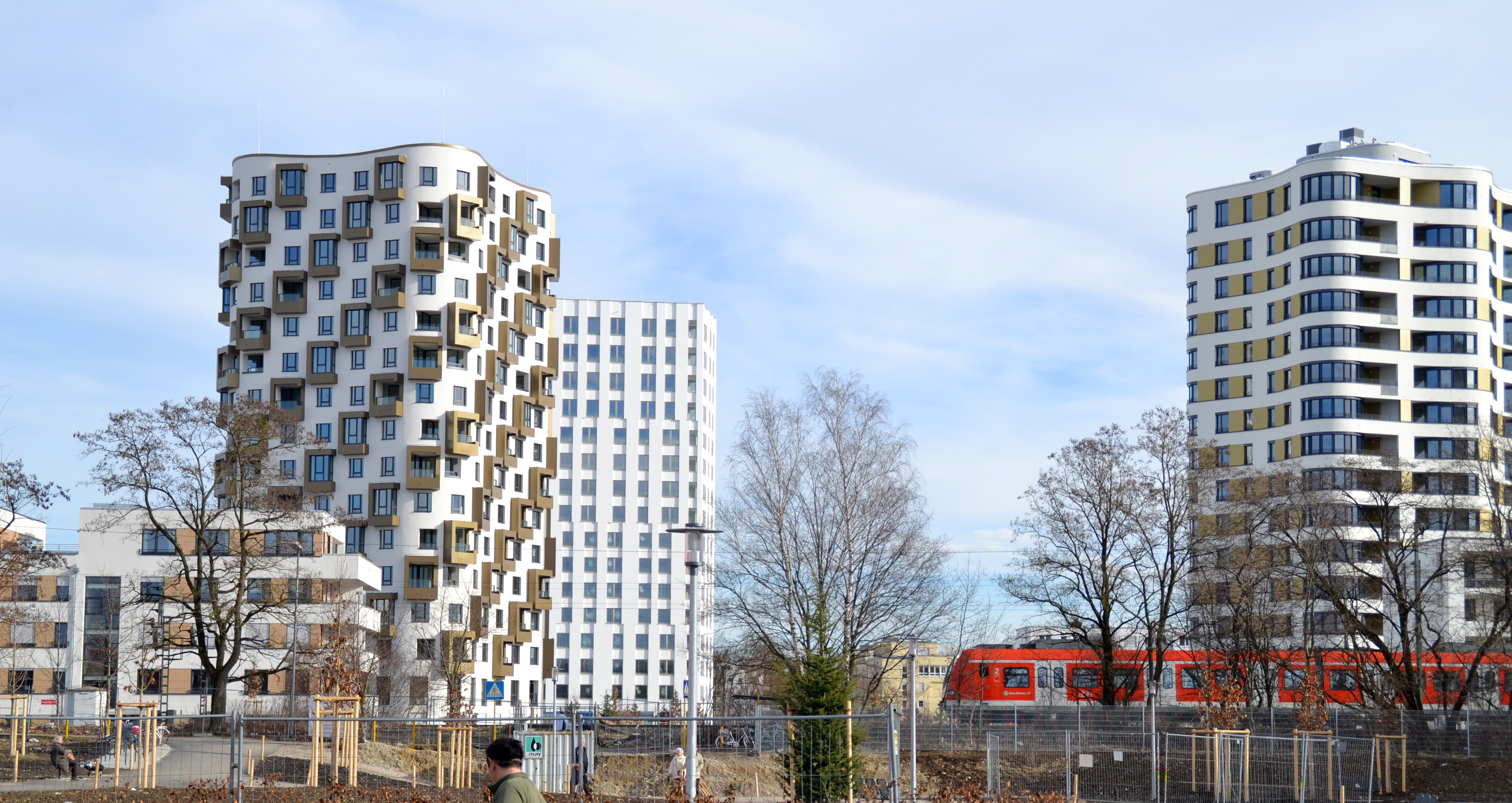
Residential area in Obersendling

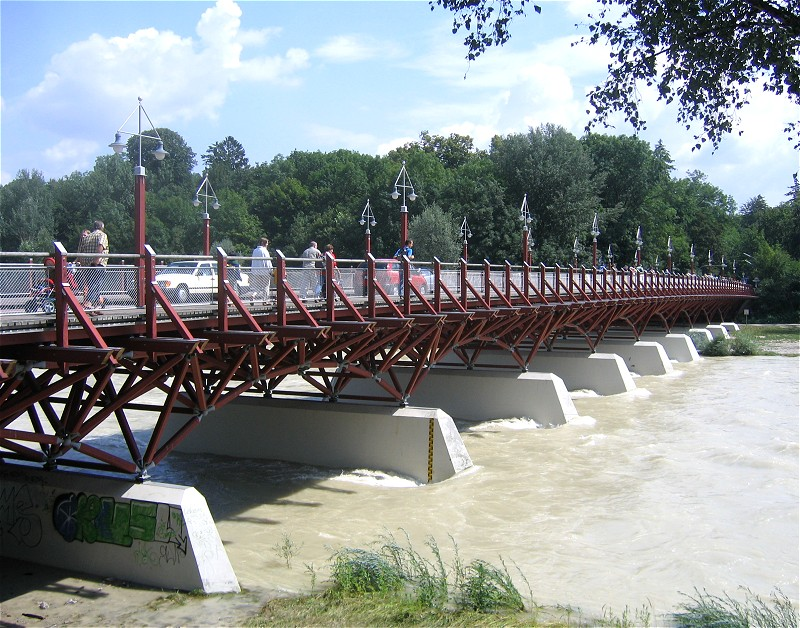
Thalkirchner bridge crossing the Isar

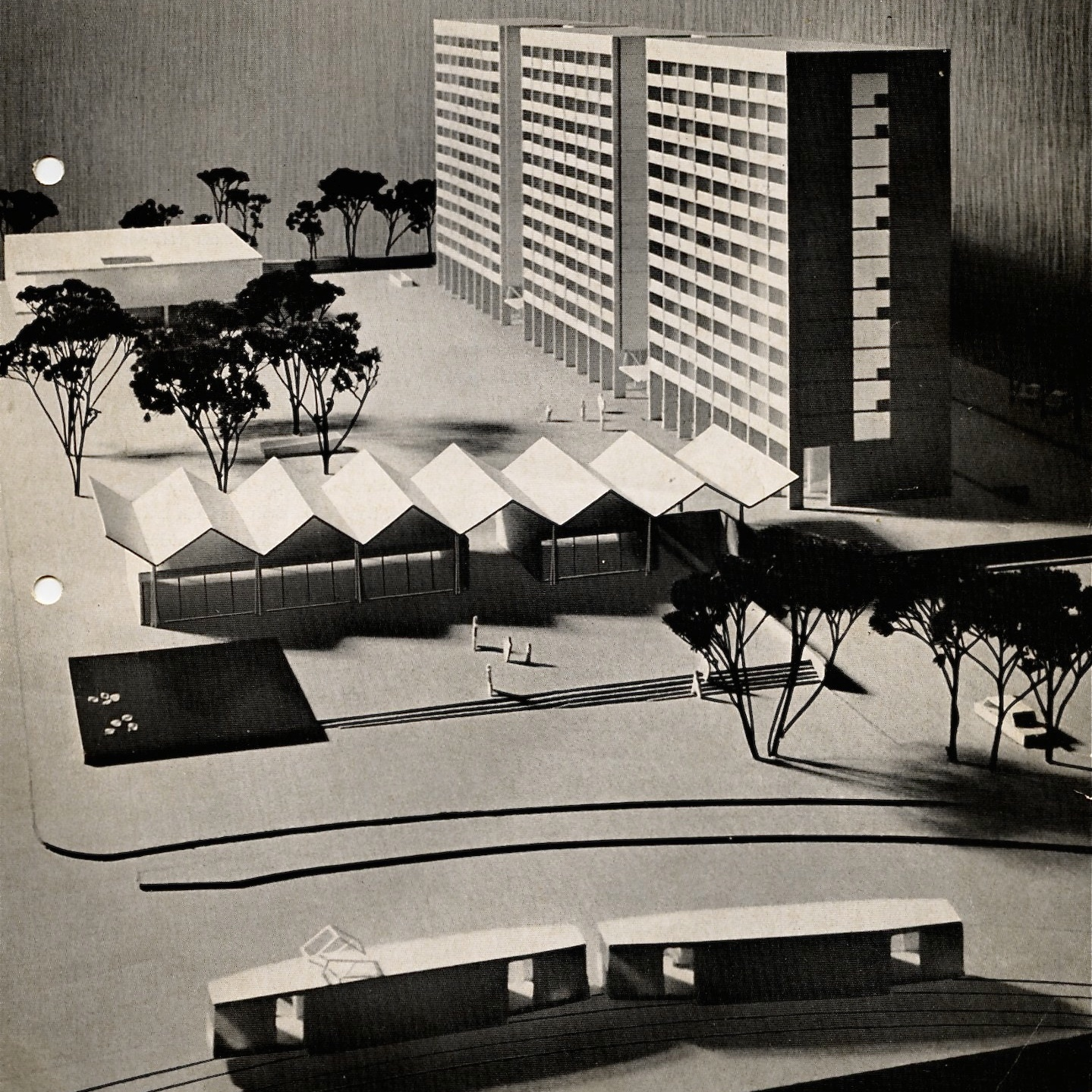
Sparkassenhochhaus Fürstenried 1

=== Thalkirchen ===
Thalkirchen is located on the river Isar and is a mostly residential district. Sights include the Flaucher, a part of the Isarauen ("floodplains") and a popular recreation site, and Tierpark Hellabrunn (Munich Zoo) which can be found on the opposite side of the river from Thalkirchen. The U-Bahn station Thalkirchen provides westside riverfront access to the zoo, which is on the eastern bank of the river. This is possible because of the Tierpark bridge, connecting the two sides, which is very close to the location of the U-Bahn station.

=== Obersendling ===
Obersendling is located up-slope from Thalkirchen and north of Solln. The district is dominated by Siemens which has a large presence at Siemenswerke. The district can be reached by U-Bahn via the Aidenbachstraße and Obersendling stations, which are on the U3 line. It is also served by the München Siemenswerke station, which is on the S7 and S20 and is served by regional trains.

=== Forstenried ===
Forstenried is an area in the far southwest of the city of Munich. It is mostly residential, with some shopping, restaurant, and entertainment opportunities.

Forstenried is located west of Solln and Obersendling, east of Fürstenried, south of Hadern, south of Sendling-Westpark, and north of Forstenrieder Park (gemeindefrei). It is more specifically bounded by the A95 to the west, Drygalski Allee and Waterloostraße to the east, Boschetsriederstraße to the north, and Forstenrieder Park to the south. It is served by the U3 U-bahn stations Forstenrieder Allee and Basler Straße. Buslines include buses 132, 133, and 134.

Forstenried is centered on the intersection of Forstenrieder Allee and Liesl-Karlstadt-Straße/ Herterichstraße. This is the center of the old village of Forstenried, which was incorporated as part of Munich in 1912. The Heilig Kreuz (Holy Cross) Church is at the center of the old village, as well as the Maypole, a World War I and World War II memorial, some shops, a pharmacy, a social club, and some restaurants.

Forstenried abuts Forstenrieder Park, a large, protected forest, stretching to the south toward Pullach and Starnberg and to the west Neuried. Forstenrieder Park offers recreational opportunities, with paved and unpaved paths, including deciduous and evergreen trees. Forstenried borders a major European headquarters for McDonald's. On the northeast side, just outside Forstenried, near McDonald's, there is a large retail area, including car dealerships, fitness centers, a major hardware store, a major electronics store, and more. On the northwestern side, there are shopping opportunities centered on the Forstenrieder Allee U-Bahn station, including a bowling alley. The area north and west of Zuricherstraße includes many high-density apartments, whereas heading south on Forstenrieder Allee from Forstenrieder Allee U-Bahn station there is mostly lower-density housing. The area south of the center of Forstenried, heading toward Forstenrieder Park, include mostly upscale, single-family housing. The area north and east of Forstenrieder Allee U-Bahn station is mostly lower-density housing. On the far southeast side, adjacent to Drygalski Alee and Herterichstraße, there are some high-rise apartments, bordered by large crop fields. This area includes one large apartment building that is over 20 stories tall and serves as a major landmark, as one of the tallest apartments in Munich and the tallest building in southern Munich.

Forstenried is served by Bad Forstenrieder Park, a public bath. It is also served by Tennis Forstenrieder Park. A shooting range is located on the border of Forstenrieder Park, at the Verein Hubertus f. Jagd- u. Sportschießen e.V. The Bezirkssportanlage Solln (a sports club) and the surrounding public park provide recreational opportunities to Forstenried residents on the southside of the district, including a dirt bike park, a view of the Alps from an artificial hill, playgrounds, and fruit-picking opportunities in the surrounding fields.

The A95 provides easy access to Lake Starnberg, just ten minutes to the southwest, as well as to recreational opportunities in the Bavarian Alps, including the ski town of Garmisch-Partenkirchen. The A95 also allows residents to quickly access central Munich, including the Mittlerer Ring, where the autobahn terminates.

=== Fürstenried ===
Fürstenried is a residential neighborhood along the A95 that was initiated in 1959 as a large scale urban housing development by the municipality and the savings bank of Munich Stadtsparkasse München.

Fürstenried was developed in three discrete construction phases: Fürstenried 1 (now Fürstenried Ost), Fürstenried 2 (now Fürstenried West), and Fürstenried 3 (now Neu-Forstenried)

==== Fürstenried 1 ====
Now Fürstenried Ost, was built from 1960-1961 after an urban planning commission chose the development proposal by Architects Franz Ruf and Fred Angerer. It is located to the east of the Bundesautobahn A95. At the center of the development is the Sparkassenhochhaus, a 14 story residential building in the style of a slab high rise built in 1961 from plans of the Studio of the German Architect Fred Angerer by the architects Kurt Räder and Gerhard Feuser. The building was awarded the first prize of the Association of German Architects BDA in Bavaria in 1967. At the time of completion, it was the largest single residential building in Bavaria.

==== Fürstenried 2 ====
Now Fürstenried West, was also part of the original development plan and features groups of single family homes in a low-rise high-density configuration erected in 1962-1963.

==== Fürstenried 3 ====
Now Neu-Forstenried, is a similar density extension of the development Fürstenried Ost and was erected after 1963. It is situated to the south of Fürstenried West alongside the Autobahn and adjacent to the Forstenrieder Park.

The development is named after Schloss Fürstenried, a palace erected in 1715 by Max Emanuel, Elector of Bavaria as a hunting lodge.

=== Solln ===
Solln is a mostly upscale, low-density residential area, recognized as one of the nicest in Munich, which includes the southernmost land area in the city of Munich. Solln is close to, but not adjacent to the River Isar, which is just to the east. Solln is served by München Solln station, which is on the S7 and S20 S-Bahn lines.
