= Waldwirtschaft =

Coordinates: 48.0667°N 11.5394°E

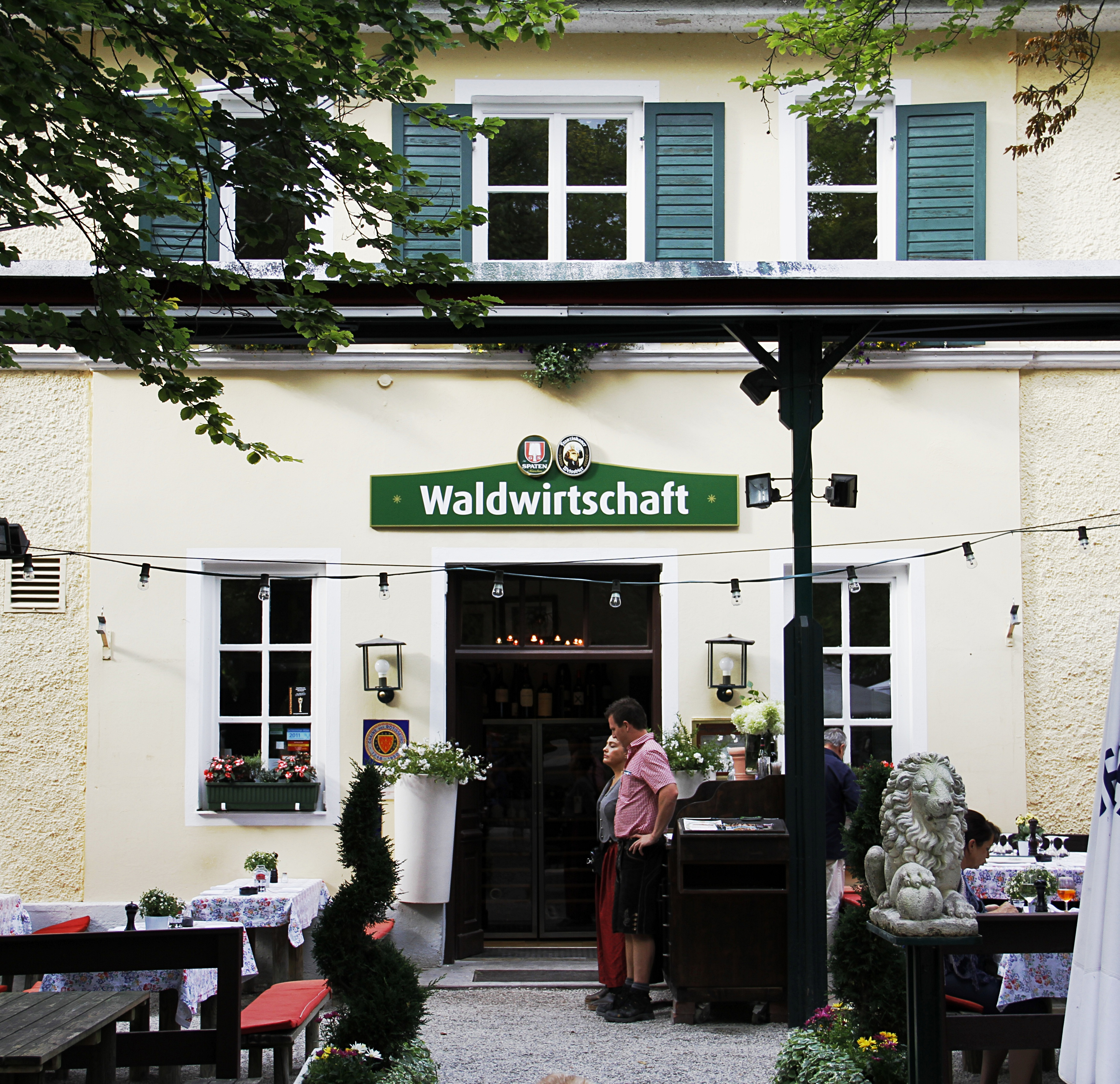
Waldwirtschaft

The Waldwirtschaft is a German tavern with a large beer garden in Munich (district), just south of the Bavarian capital. It is situated in the municipality of Pullach in the ward of Großhesselohe on the high bank (fluvial terrace) of the Isar. Sepp Krätz has been the publican since 1981, and has run the Hippodrome Festival Tent at the Oktoberfest from 1995 to 2014.

The tavern is a two-winged hip roof building dating from the middle of the 19th century and is a listed building together with the neighbouring Chapel of the Holy Trinity.

== History ==
The earliest mention of the property dates back to 776 and a dairy in the possession of Tassilo III, Duke of Bavaria, which, together with the hamlet of Baierbrunn, was gifted to the Schäftlarn Abbey in the hope that his soul might find everlasting peace. Two hundred years later the dairy left church ownership and, in 1301, the Duke's steward, Konrad von Baierbrunn, sold the property, described as "woodland with dairy", to the Holy Spirit Hospital of Munich. The Hospital made use of the dairy and other farms to provision the poor of the city. After a fire, the Order of the Holy Spirit pulled out of Munich and the Hospital, together with its farms, fell into the ownership of the City of Munich. The brewery tavern was given a public license in the 15th century.

In 1782 Hesselohe was described as a hamlet of "a few houses ... with a hermitage and a little church" and the same article suggested that the area was popular with the inhabitants of Munich. It is thought that one or more hermits had moved into the general area of the dairy, and the citizens of the city would seek these out to ask for prayers on their behalf. These visitors most likely also made use of the tavern at the dairy. The popularity of the area may well have grown as a result of the annual celebration to commemorate the founding of the church. This celebration was held amongst the trees alongside the Isar during Whitsun from the 18th century.

From 1779 an annual fair would take place at the dairy to coincide with the religious celebration. This fair is most likely to have been brought into existence as a result of the financial difficulties in which the Holy Spirit Hospital had found itself. The Hospital had already sought permission from Charles Theodore, Elector of Bavaria to hold a festival on June 29 to celebrate the Feast of Saints Peter and Paul. The dairy fell into difficulties during the Napoleonic Wars when the tenants became bankrupt. The City agreed to an auction in order to achieve some liquidity. A café owner from Munich, Paul Schröfl, became the new owner. He built a dance pavilion amongst the trees which became popular with the young people of Munich. Around this were built a number of lodges for closed communities, particularly groups of artists from Munich.
