= Fürstenrieder Straße 255 =

Coordinates: 48.1119°N 11.5027°E

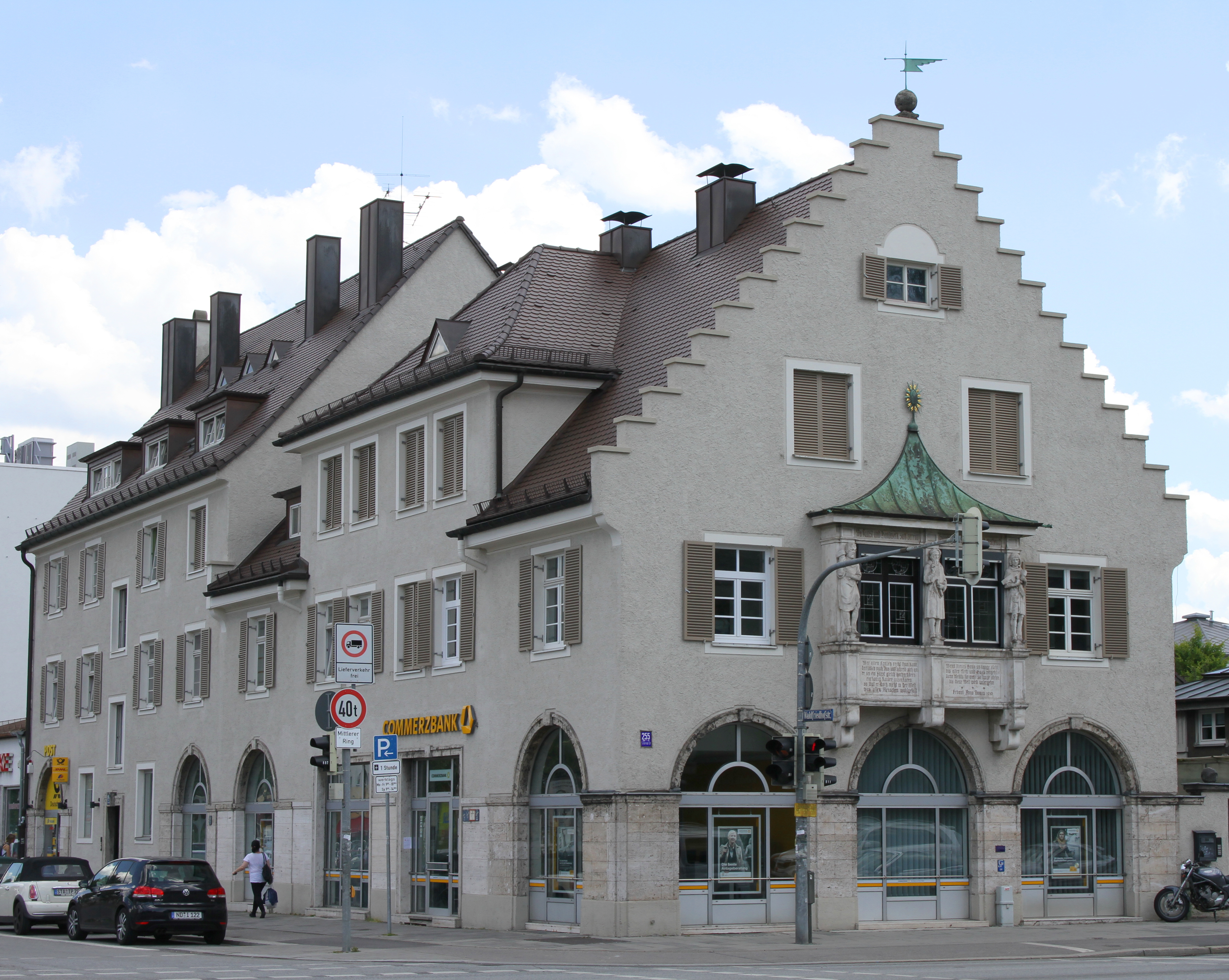
Fürstenrieder Straße 255

Fürstenrieder Straße 255 is a residential and commercial building in Munich, Germany. It is registered as a historical building in the Bayerische Denkmalliste.

== Description ==
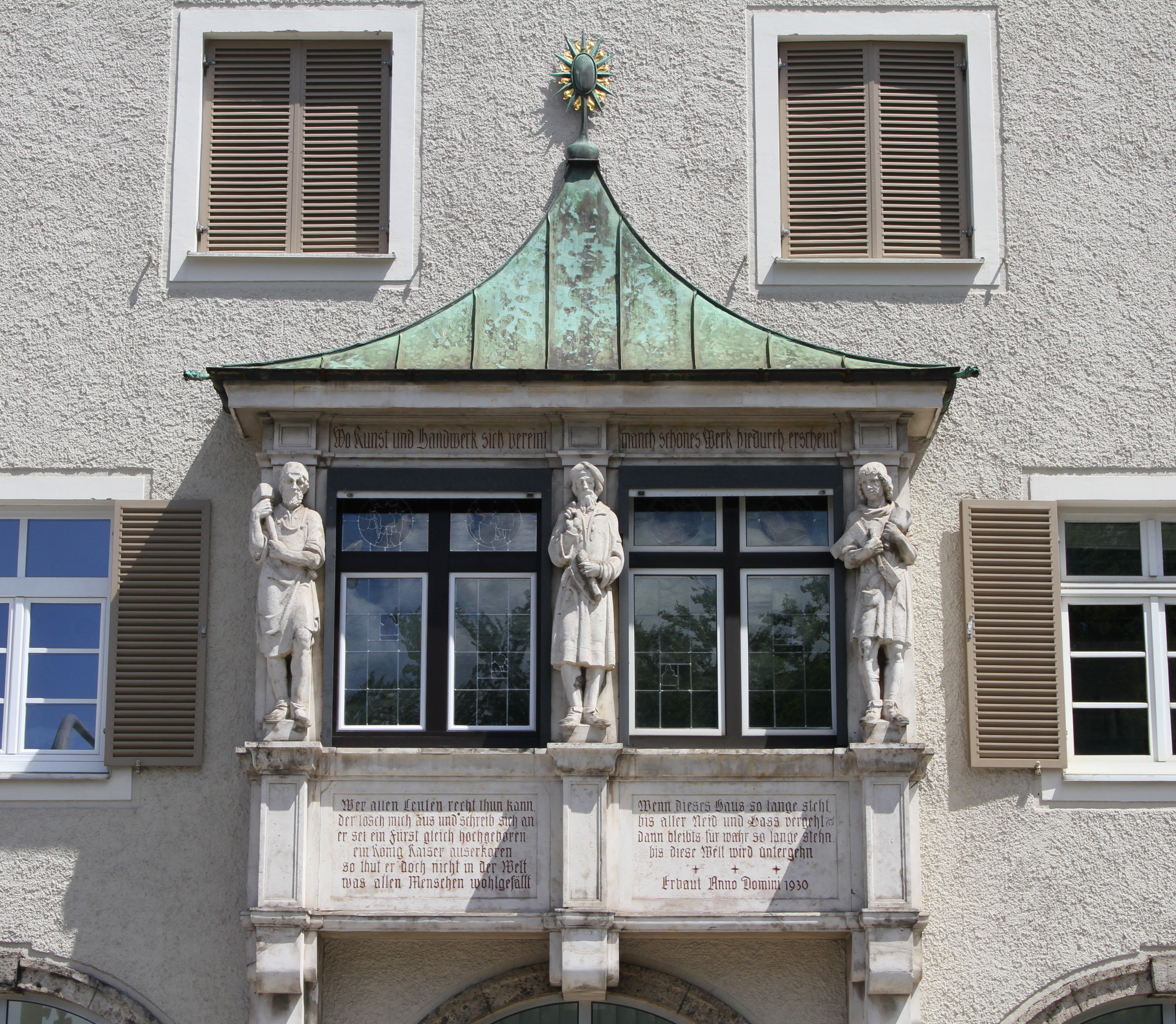
Figure oriel at the gable front

The house is located in the Munich district Sendling-Westpark at the southeast corner of the intersection Fürstenrieder Straße / Waldfriedhofstraße, opposite the Waldfriedhof. On the site, the Munich gravestone sculptor Georg Halbich, who had his workshop on the neighbouring property at Fürstenrieder Straße 257, operated a flower kiosk in the 1920s there. In 1930, he had J. Wymer build a residential and commercial building in his native home style.

Although the house stands at a prominent intersection, it is not designed as a corner house, but as a two-storey saddle-roofed building. The gable façade with two-storey stair gable faces Fürstenrieder Straße. The ground floor has large arcade arches with shop windows for the stores. The apartments in the upper and attic floors have lattice windows with shutters. The upper floor has a two-winged bay window on the gable façade. The windows of the bay window are lined with figures, which presumably come from Halbich himself.
