= Pullach =

Pullach i. Isartal
- Municipality
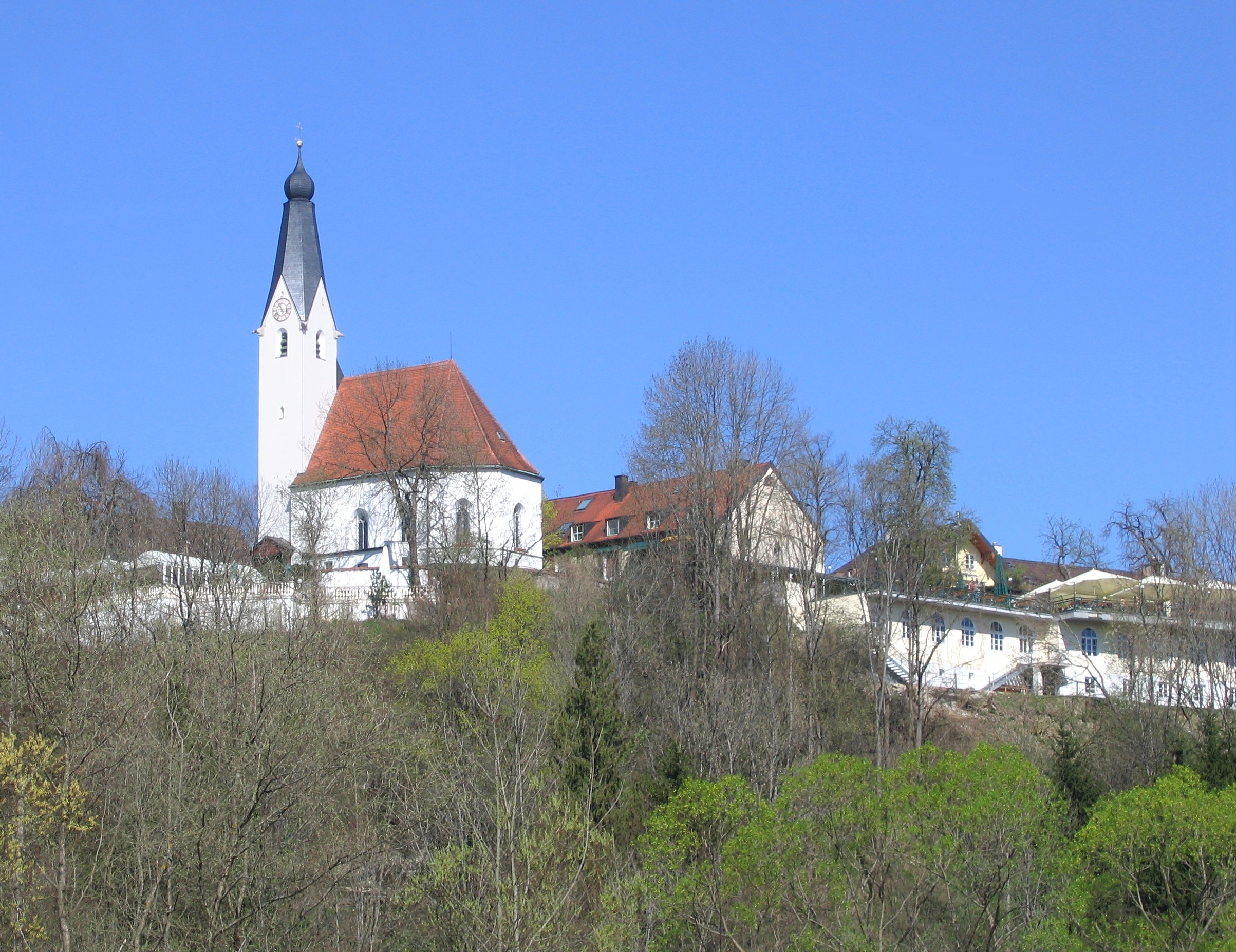
- Pullach seen from the east

- Coat of arms

- Location of Pullach i. Isartal within Munich district
- Interactive map of Pullach i. Isartal
- Location within Germany Location within Bavaria
- Coordinates: 48°03′N 11°31′E
- Country: Germany
- State: Bavaria
- Admin. region: Oberbayern
- District: Munich

Government
  - Mayor (2026–32): Christine Eisenmann (CSU)

Area
  - Total: 7.4 km^{2} (2.9 sq mi)
- Elevation: 560–596 m (1,837–1,955 ft)

Population (2025-12-31)
  - Total: 8,545
  - Density: 1,200/km^{2} (3,000/sq mi)
- Time zone: UTC+01:00 (CET)
  - Summer (DST): UTC+02:00 (CEST)
- Postal codes: 82049
- Dialling codes: 089
- Vehicle registration: M
- Website: www.pullach.de

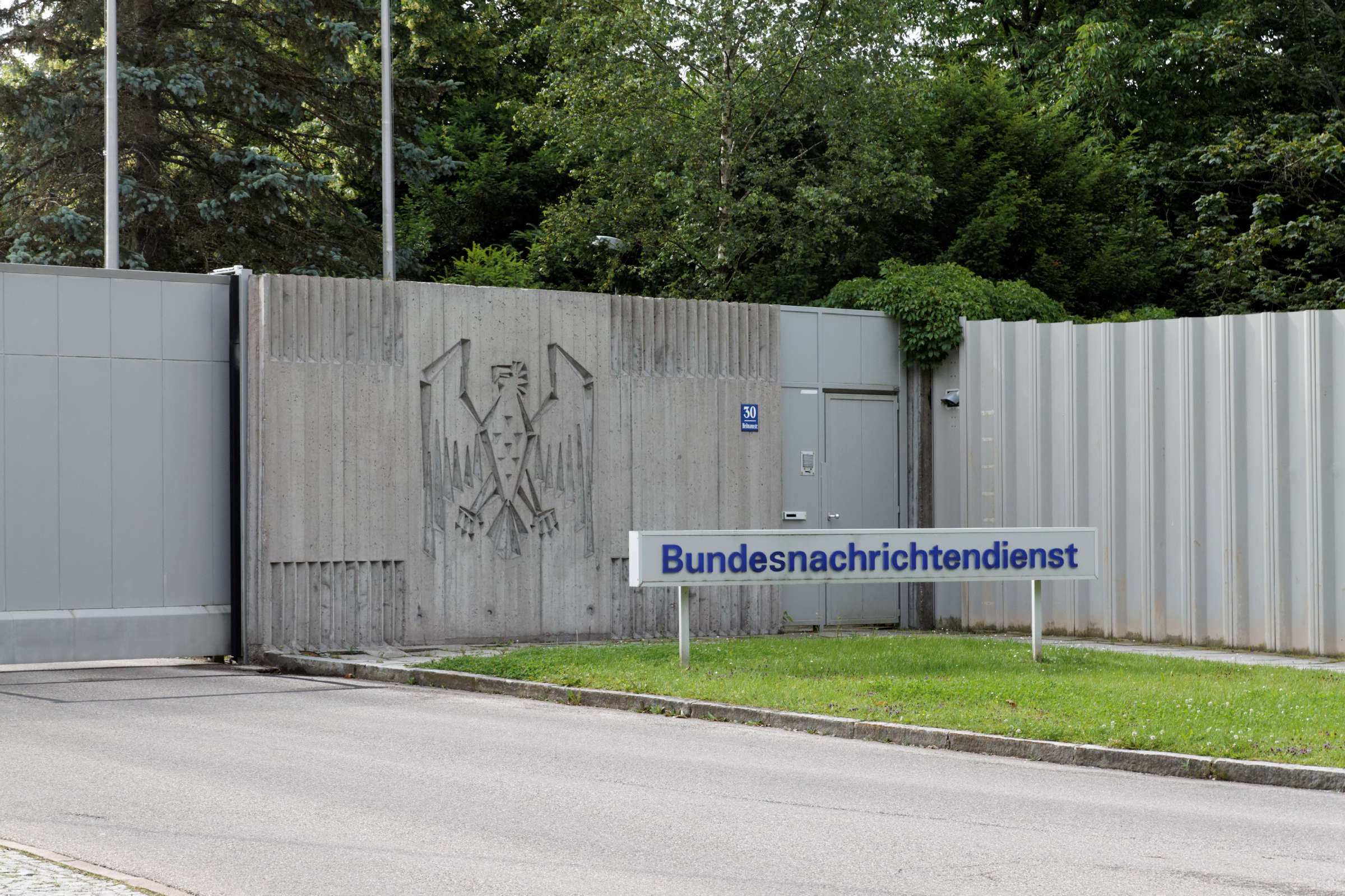
BND head office in Pullach

Pullach, officially Pullach i. Isartal (German pronunciation: [ˈpʊlax ʔɪm ˈiːzaʁˌtaːl], lit. 'Pullach in the Isar Valley'), is a municipality in the district of Munich in Bavaria in Germany. It lies on the Isar Valley Railway and is served by the S 7 line of the Munich S-Bahn, at the Großhesselohe Isartalbahnhof, Pullach and Höllriegelskreuth railway stations.

The headquarters of the intelligence agency of the German government, the Bundesnachrichtendienst (BND), was located in Pullach from 1956 until the agency moved to Berlin. The new headquarters in Berlin, completed in 2017, opened officially in February 2019. Until the move to Berlin, "Pullach" was a metonym for "the BND" just as "Langley" is for "the CIA" in the United States.

== Geography ==
Pullach sits on the western bank of the Isar river, just south of Munich.

=== Neighbouring municipalities ===
On the opposite bank of the Isar, lies the municipality of Grünwald, Bavaria, with the municipality of Baierbrunn further south. The municipality is bordered to the north by Munich, specifically the suburbs of Solln and Harlaching. The Forstenrieder Park marks the western boundary.

== Municipality wards ==
The municipality of Pullach im Isartal is divided into five separate wards: Gartenstadt, Großhesselohe, Isarbad, Höllriegelskreuth and Pullach.

=== Gartenstadt ===
The ward of Gartenstadt developed in the area between Höllriegelskreuth and Pullach, just west of the railway, during the 1920s. The dominant architecture of the area is terraced and detached homes in a more leafy surrounding. The street names typically reflect this type of environment, such as Ahornallee (Acorn Alley) and Tannenstraße (Pine Street). Few of the original houses remain, one such original property can be found at 11, Josef-Heppner-Str.

=== Großhesselohe ===
Großhesselohe lies to the north of the municipality, between the city suburb of Solln and the River Isar. The renowned Waldwirtschaft inn sits on the south east edge of the municipality, on the high bank above the River Isar. There is already mention of an estate here from 776. This was acquired in 1301 by the Hospital of the Holy Spirit and was then run by the City of Munich from 1330. The idyllic location, not to mention the locally brewed beer, proved a great draw for the populace of Munich. The operation became part of the Spaten Brewery in 1930.

=== Höllriegelskreuth ===
Named after Franz Höllriegel, the stonemason who founded the area, Höllriegelskreuth is mainly an industrial and business area. It is the location of the headquarters for Sixt (car rental) and Linde (chemicals).

=== Isarbad ===
This area has a few houses, the remains of a lido and spa (at the foot of the high bank next to the Isar canal), the Isar hydroelectric station and a scattering of other buildings. It is often not considered an independent ward.

=== Pullach ===
The ward of Pullach is at the heart of the municipality and it is here that you will find the town hall, the Church of the Holy Spirit, as well as cafés and a few inns and taverns. On the high bank above the Isar, is Schwaneck Castle, now a youth training and activity centre, as well as a youth hostel. Here also are the buildings and land of the German Intelligence Service, which stretch out east of the railway to the Isar and are dissected into two halves by Heilmannstraße.

== History ==
Burial mounds found close to the banks of the river in Höllriegelskreuth attest to the existence of a settlement during the Celtic period. The Roman road between Augsburg and Salzburg crosses the deep Isar valley just south of Pullach. The area is first mentioned when Tassilo III, Duke of Bavaria, gave the estate of Hesinlohe to Schäftlarn Abbey in 776. A church, built in Pullach in 806 (other sources suggest 804) is included in the list of ownership drafted for Arnulf, Duke of Bavaria in 1060. Until the separation of church and state in Bavaria in 1808, the histories of Pullach and Großhesselohe had been basically separate.

=== Großhesselohe ===
Großhesselohe was first mentioned in a declaration by Duke Tassilo III when the area was bequeathed to the newly founded Tegernsee Abbey. It was then later transferred out of the ownership of Schäftlarn Abbey to the nobles of Baierbrunn. The estate was bought by the Holy Spirit Hospital, Munich in 1301 and the dairy served the needs of the hospital. A church was built for the workers in the dairy and this was later replaced in 1698. The estate transferred to private ownership after the separation of church and state in Bavaria. For a time it was owned by Maximilian von Montgelas and his classically styled palace still stands. Later there were a number of disputes between the Municipality of Pullach and the City of Munich regarding the estate. Ownership of the estate, including the palace, brewery and related concerns, passed to Eduard Woellner I, and later his sons Eduard II and Fritz. The estate had been largely deforested prior to their stewardship, but by 1919 the woodlands had been restored.

Eduard II and Fritz Woellner founded the Woellner Property Management Company for exclusive private residences in Großhesselohe in 1925, after which the estate was divided up for sale. Fritz made a gift of around 24000 sq.m of the family holdings to the recently established Großhesselohe Tennis Club and had a clubhouse built to emulate an English country club. He would later be voted in as honorary president of the tennis club.

In 1930 the woodland inn was sold to the Spaten Brewery. The chemical factory owner, Eduard I Woellner died in Großhesselohe in 1938 when the remainder of the estate was passed to his sons, Eduard II and Fritz, in trust. In 1939 an area of about 70 hectares, was leased to the authorities through Martin Bormann for a nominal sum.

Shortly after this, more or less, compulsory sale, the Bohrmann Estate was built. During the early years of the war, many of the estate buildings, including the brewery were used by the Party. Fritz Woellner's family, including his new born son, Félix, and his elderly widowed mother, were forced to move into Hotel Bittman. The estate was sold to the Gradinger tea manufacturer shortly afterwards. Payment was deferred until after the currency reform was enacted. Ownership of the land was not restored after the war, but rather became the home of, first the Gehlen Organization, and later the Bundesnachrichtendienst.

Although the Woellner family were themselves Protestants, they donated land and monies from earlier land-sales to the Roman Catholic Holy Trinity Foundation, which later built a church in 1952. After the war the sale of land continued. The Municipality of Pullach recognized Fritz Woellner as an honorary citizen and renamed the square in front of the train station Woellnerplatz in his honour.

Fritz Woellner sold the last large parcel of land to the Tennis Club in 1986. A few smaller areas remain and are used as additional green spaces by the municipality.

=== Pullach ===
Pullach was originally an agricultural municipality. First written mention of a church here is to be found in the Konrad Register of 1315, which identifies it as a daughter church of Thalkirchen. The area only had about 250 inhabitants at the end of the 15th century, when the old church was built. The area was clearly not wealthy as the construction was paid for by a number of wealthy patrons from Munich. The population remained around the 200 mark until the middle of the 19th century, when the population suddenly expanded due to industrialization.

=== From the middle of the 19th century ===
Pullach became the preferred day trip for the Munich populace with the building of the Bavarian Maximilian's Railway in 1854 and the Isar Valley Railway in 1891. To cope with the throngs of visitors, the station had at least 6 platforms. The visitors would promenade en masse along the Isar to the various beer gardens of the Waldwirtschaft inn in Großhesselohe, the Rabenwirt (Raven Tavern) in the local centre, which had at least 5,000 seats, as well as the Bürgerbräu.

In conjunction with this development as a tourist location, Pullach became popular as an area for artists. Several villas of this period remain, together with Schwaneck Castle, which was built by Ludwig von Schwanthaler and is now mainly used as a youth hostel.

A lido with spa was built along the bank of the Isar in 1892, though this remained as a working concern only until 1904.

A hydro-electric and steam power station was built near Höllriegelskreuth in 1894, and a further hydro-electric power station was built in Pullach in 1901. This laid the foundations for industrialization of the area with the arrival of Lindes Ice Machines (now the Linde Group) and the Munich Electro-chemical Works (now United Initiators).

During the period of Nazi Germany, Pullach was of importance due to the Reichssiedlung Rudolf Heß, a kind of housing estate for the Party elite, and the location of the Führer Headquarters on the land now used by the BND.

Pullach was one of the first municipalities in and around Munich to develop a district heating system using geothermal energy, which came online in 2005. Water, which reaches a temperature of 107 °C, is accessed from the Late Jurassic level, deep beneath the ground.

A large anniversary festival was held at the end of July in 2006 to celebrate the area's 1200 years.

== Politics ==
=== Mayor ===
Susanna Tausendfreund (Alliance '90/The Greens) was voted in as First Mayor for the municipality. She took over from her predecessor, Jürgen Westenthanner (Christian Social Union in Bavaria) in 2014.

=== Coat of arms ===
Pullach has had its own coat of arms since 1956. It is made up of three parts:

- A beech tree with silver roots against a blue background represents the origins of the municipality's name.
- This name dates back to 1160 and the Pullach family whose lineage can be traced back to the nobles of Baierbrunn. The three silver yardsticks on a black background, is the coat of arms of Baierbrunn.
- The silver wave represents the Isar.

The colours of white and blue represent the continued allegiance of the municipality to the Bavarian State (History of Bavaria).

=== Partner towns ===
The following partnerships exist:

- Pauillac in France since 1964.
- The region of Baryshivka (Баришівка) and the city of Berezan (Березань) in Ukraine since 1990.
- Falkensee in Germany.

== Education ==
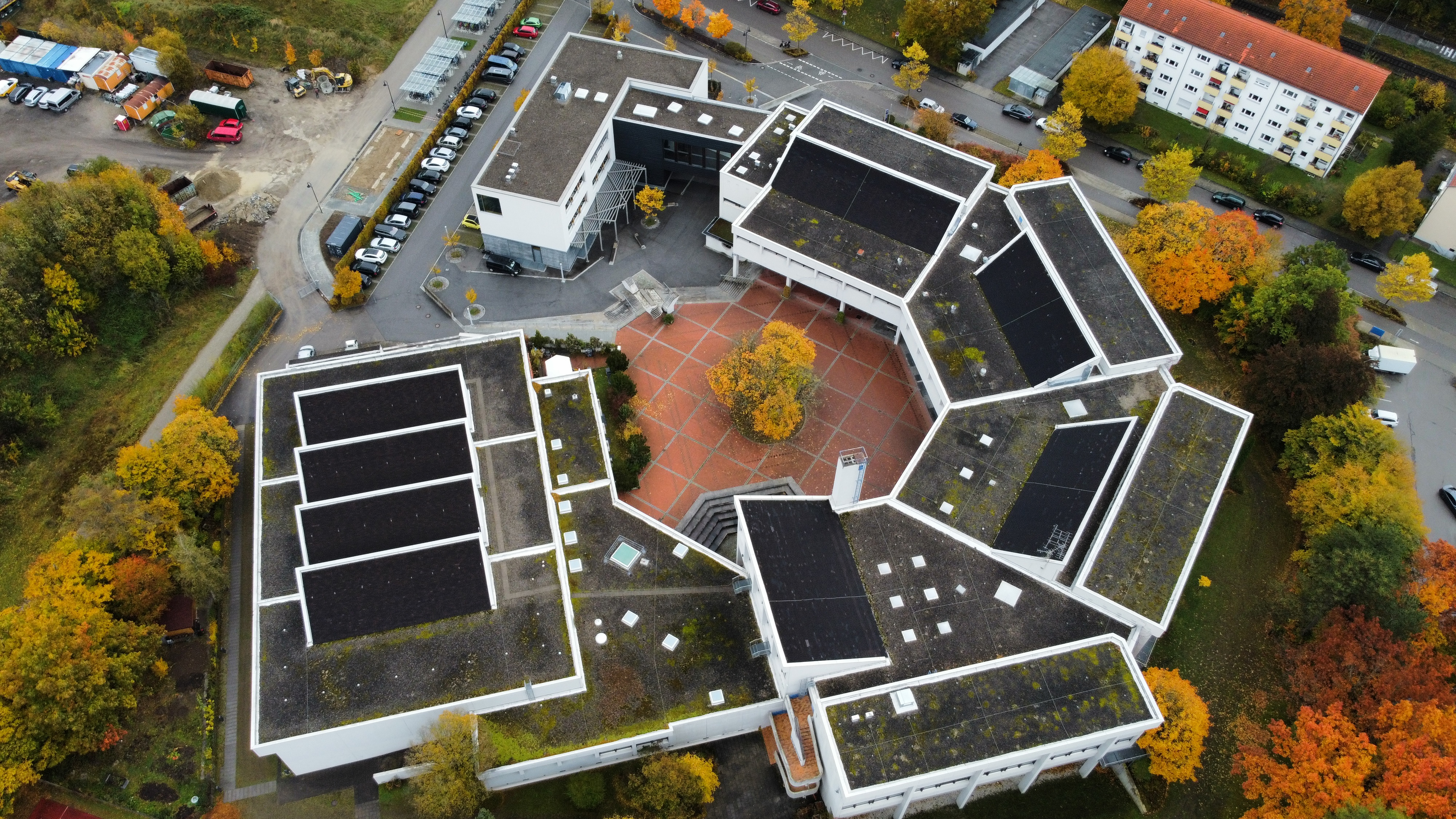
Otfried-Preußler-Gymnasium Pullach

Schools in the community include:

- Grundschule Pullach i. Isartal
- Josef-Breher-Mittelschule Pullach i. Isartal (junior high)
- Otfried-Preußler-Gymnasium Pullach (senior high/sixth-form)
- Tagesheimschulen Pullach der Erzdiözese München und Freising (secondary schools)

== Culture and sights ==
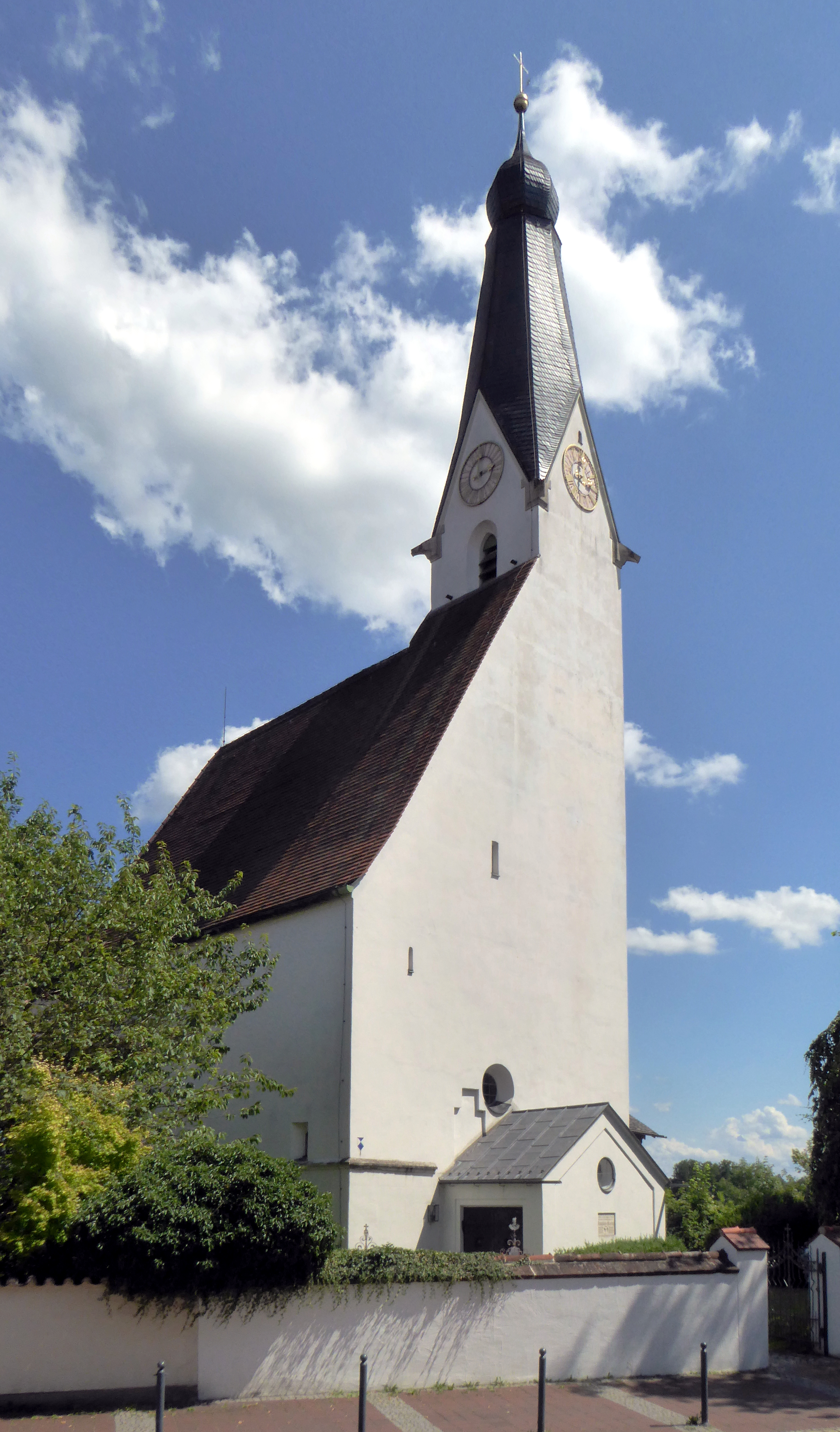
The gothic Church of the Holy Spirit, Kirchplatz

- Burial mounds dating from the Hallstatt period on the upper bank of the Isar, near Höllriegelskreuth.
- The sunken lane along the Isar was a part of the Roman road from Augsburg to Salzburg. It is at the southern end of Pullach.
- The Church of the Holy Spirit, Kirchplatz, was built between 1480–1490 in the gothic style.
- The Chapel of the Holy Trinity, Großhesselohe, was built in 1698 and is within the Waldwirtschaft inn. (Only open upon request)
- Schwaneck Castle is now a youth hostel. Its great hall and other historical rooms. (Only open to the public during special events)
- The old train station of the Isar Valley Railway at Großhesselohe, built in 1891.
- The old Jesuit high school named after John Berchmans, built in 1925, transferred to Munich in 1975, named now Munich School of Philosophy. The Building is now used by the Pater-Rupert-Mayer-School of the Roman Catholic Archdiocese of Munich and Freising. (Not accessible to the public). In the Area is located th Cemetery of the Jesuits, burial place of e.g. Alois Grillmeier and Augustin Rösch.
- The Großhesselohe Bridge, built in 1985, is one of the world's highest railway bridges.

== Sport ==
The town's association football club, SV Pullach, formed in 1946, experienced its greatest success in 2013, when it won promotion to the Bayernliga for the first time.

Racing driver Sophia Flörsch is based in Pullach.
