= Thalkirchen station =

Station of the Munich U-Bahn

Thalkirchen
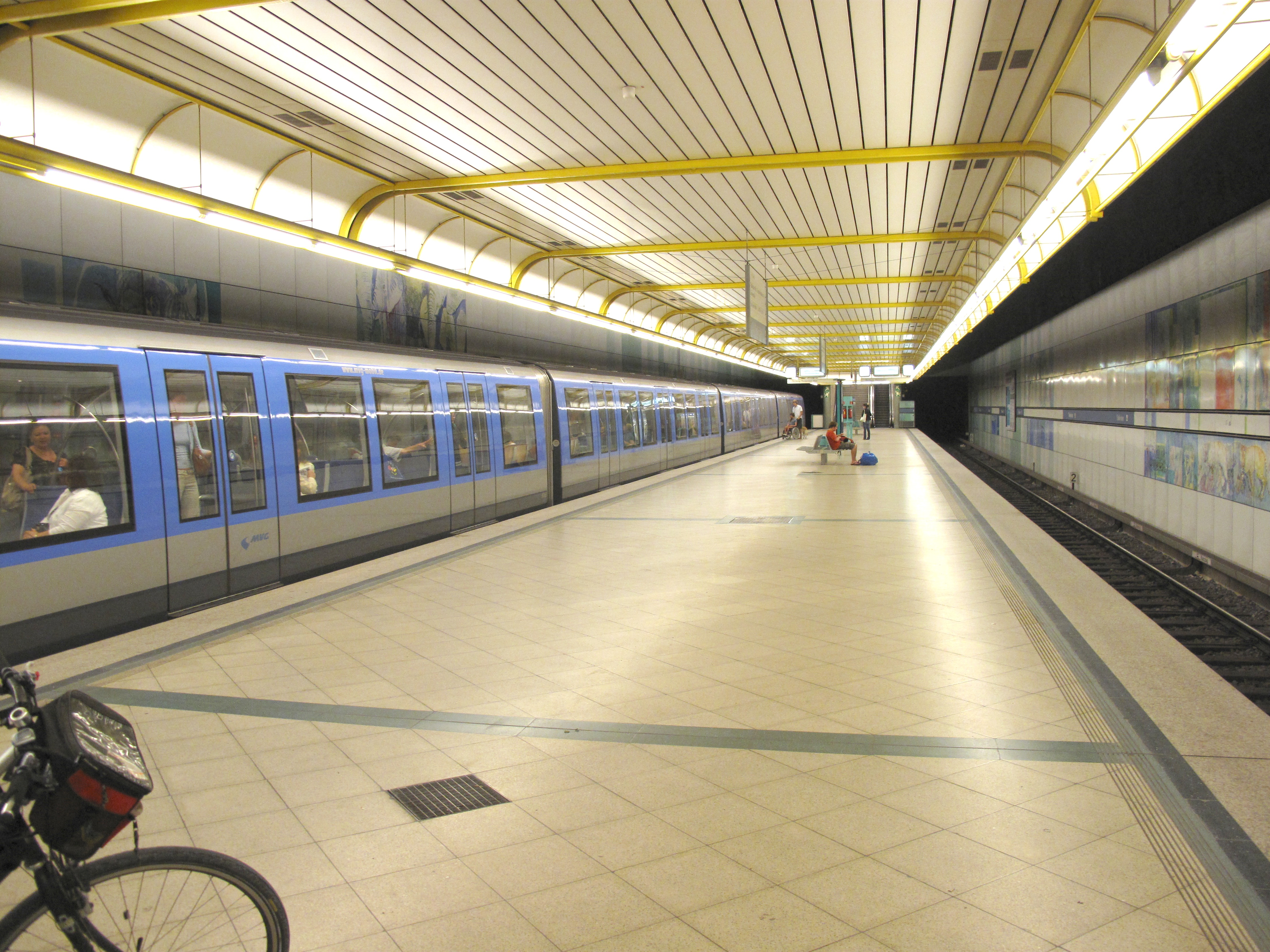

General information
- Location: Thalkirchen; Munich, Germany
- Coordinates: 48°06′09″N 11°32′46″E
- Platforms: Island platform
- Tracks: 2

Construction
- Structure type: Underground
- Accessible: Yes

Other information
- Fare zone: : M

History
- Opened: 28 October 1989

Services
| Preceding station | Munich U-Bahn | Following station |
|---|---|---|
| Obersendling towards Fürstenried West | U3 | Brudermühlstraße towards Moosach |
Location

Thalkirchen is a Munich U-Bahn station in the Munich borough of Thalkirchen, near the Tierpark Hellabrunn (Munich Zoo).
