= International Garden Expo 83 =

Horticultural exhibition in Munich

Coordinates: 48°07′21″N 11°31′21″E

EXPO 1983 Munich

Overview
- BIE-class: Horticultural exposition
- Name: International Horticultural Expo 83

Participant(s)
- Countries: 23

Location
- Country: Germany
- City: Munich

Timeline
- Opening: April 28, 1983
- Closure: October 9, 1983

Horticultural expositions
- Previous: Amsterdam 1982 in Amsterdam
- Next: Liverpool1984 in Liverpool

International Garden Expo 83 (Internationale Gartenbauausstellung 83) was a garden festival containing 170 exhibition contributors. The international horticultural exposition was recognised by the Bureau International des Expositions (BIE) and held from April 28 to October 9, 1983, at Westpark in Munich, Germany. Ralph Siegel wrote the Flower Serenade as official song of the exhibition; it was recorded by Hugo Strasser and his orchestra. The German Federal Post Office issued a special stamp with a stylized flower.

For the exhibition, the 60-hectare Westpark was built. It was modeled by landscape architect Peter Kluska after the shape of subalpine valleys into a previously flat area that was previously both abandoned industrial grounds and farmland.

== The exposition ==
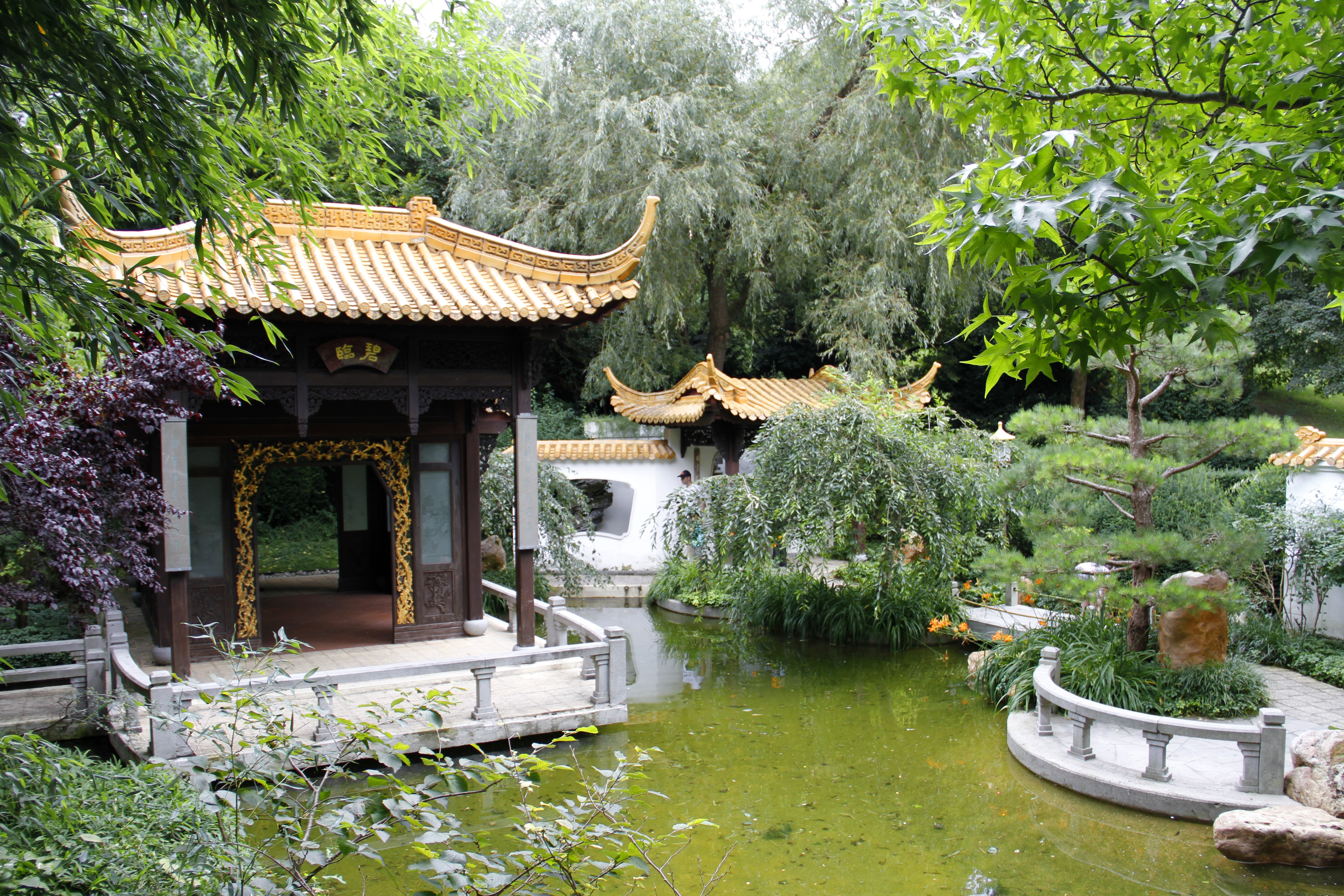
The Chinese Garden

During the exposition, Westpark was fenced and accessible with an entrance fee. A six-kilometer miniature railway with five stations transported visitors around the grounds. Transportation was linked to the exhibition by a newly build subway branch with three stations along the full length of the park. Three parking lots to the east, north and west were built, including a large one for tour busses.

The core of the exhibition was 23 international gardens, planned by gardeners and landscape architects from all over the world. Most erected a small building according to their national tradition and planted their native flora. Four Asian nations built lasting gardens, two of them with support by German merchants active in those countries. The People's Republic of China participated for the first time in a European garden exhibition and contributed a walled garden in the traditional style of a Chinese garden, as a scholar might have built it. Munich's sister city Sapporo build a combination of several traditional elements of a Japanese garden from the Heian period. Thailand erected a Sala with the statue of Gautama Buddha, which became the first consecrated Statue of Gautama Buddha in Germany. Nepal contributed a pagoda in woodwork, that was carved by master carvers in Nepal and transported to Germany. It was the first time for about 200 years that Nepali carvers build a full new pagoda. The transport was used for smuggling of about 400 kg of Hashish in cavities. Those four Asian gardens are preserved, almost all other international gardens were torn down after the show ended.

The traditional parts of the exhibition were a pattern-allotments, landscaped in the semicircle rose garden, perennial plants and other beds. There were many playgrounds, two restaurants, two beer gardens and a picnic area where visitors could bring their own food and drinks. An alpine garden, a Ferndale and a traditional cottage garden to a converted from Bavaria Bayerwald Haus completed the image of the foothills of the Alps.

In line with the growing environmental awareness of the German population for the first time, issues of nature and environmental protection have been included in the exhibition. In the eastern part of the waterscape, water runs out in a wetland with fen-character and a small-scale mosaic of vegetation zones with different surface relief and water supply. It was composed of sod, which was taken from destroyed habitats at various locations by construction projects. They were transplanted as a contribution of the Bavarian Environment Ministry to the exhibition in the park.

== Literature ==
- Martin Stangl: IGA 83 München - official exhibition catalogue. BLV Publishers, Munich 1983, ISBN 3405127009
