= Sendling-Westpark =

Borough of Munich, Germany

Coordinates: 48°07′20″N 11°31′55″E

Sendling-Westpark (German pronunciation: [ˈzɛntlɪŋ ˈvɛstpaʁk]) is the 7th borough of Munich.

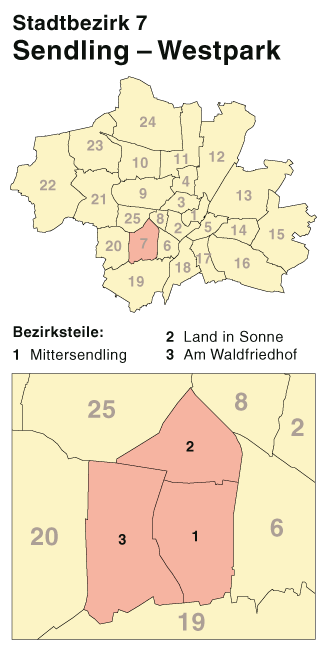
Borough 7 - Sendling-Westpark: Location in Munich

== Location ==
Sendling-Westpark is located south west of Munich and expands into the North/South extension from the 8th borough Schwanthalerhöhe as far as Obersendling (Thalkirchen-Obersendling-Forstenried-Fürstenried-Solln). The eastern border contains the S-Bahn line to Wolfratshausen, which connects borough 6 Sendling. Fürstenriederstrasse and Westendstrasse form the border in the west, beyond which lie boroughs 20 Hadern and 25 Laim.

== Description ==
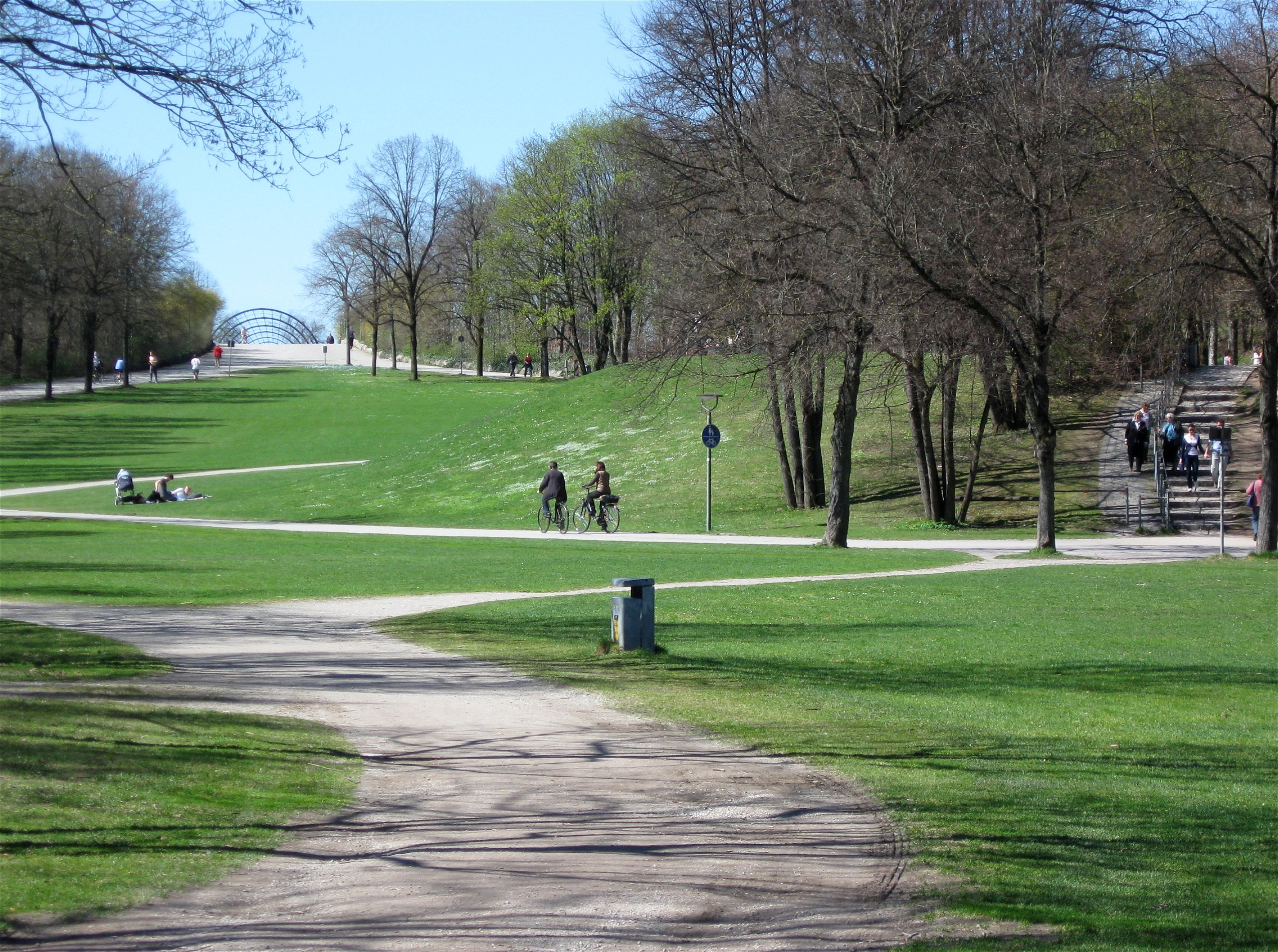
Westpark

Due to an influx of immigrants, the population count doubled between 1950 and 1995; nevertheless, the amount of foreign residents is well below the average population of the area. In the southern part, accommodation typically consists of detached and semi-detached houses built in the Interwar period. In the vicinity of the main traffic arteries, blocks of flats were built after 1948.

Important employers and facilities in the borough include the Städtische Altenheim St. Josef ("St Josef Home for the Elderly"), the Lebenshilfe Werkstatt für Behinderte ("Workshop for Disabled People"), the Integrationszentrum für Cerebralparesen ("Integration Centre for Cerebral Palsy") the Bayerische Landesschule für Gehörlose ("Bavarian State School for the Deaf"), the headquarters of the ADAC and TÜV. The Construction and metalworking industry employs a large portion of people in the borough as well.

Several important motorways pass through the borough, notably the A 96 (Munich-Lindau) and A 95 (Munich-Garmisch) Autobahnen which connect to the "Mittlerer Ring", Munich's inner city ring road system. This has brought about concerns over the volume of traffic and environmental issues. The borough's face was altered by extensive construction and landscaping work for the 1983 IGA display Westpark, complete with provisions for open air cinema, theatre and concerts, culinary delights, a Buddhist temple, play areas and other amenities.

Located in the north of the Westpark is the Rudi-Sedlmayer-Halle (Rudi Sedlmayer Hall) where cultural and sporting events previously took place. The hall is currently the home venue of the FC Bayern Munich Basketball club and has been rebranded as Audi Dome.

== Statistics ==
(Each case as of 31 December, inhabitants with principal residence.)

Year	Residents	of which Foreigners	Surface area (ha.)	Residents per ha.	More information
2000	48,388	10,724 (22.2%)	781.33	62	Statistisches Taschenbuch München 2001. pdf-Download
2001	48,608	10,846 (22.3%)	781.33	62	Statistisches Taschenbuch München 2002. pdf-Download
2002	48,448	10,781 (22.3%)	781.33	62	Statistisches Taschenbuch München 2003. pdf-Download
2003	48,564	11,020 (22.7%)	781.28	62	Statistisches Taschenbuch München 2004. pdf-Download
2004	48,669	11,127 (22.9%)	781.41	63	Statistisches Taschenbuch München 2005. pdf-Download

== See also ==
- Boroughs of Munich
