= Westpark (Munich) =

Urban park in Munich, Germany

Coordinates: 48°07′21″N 11°31′21″E

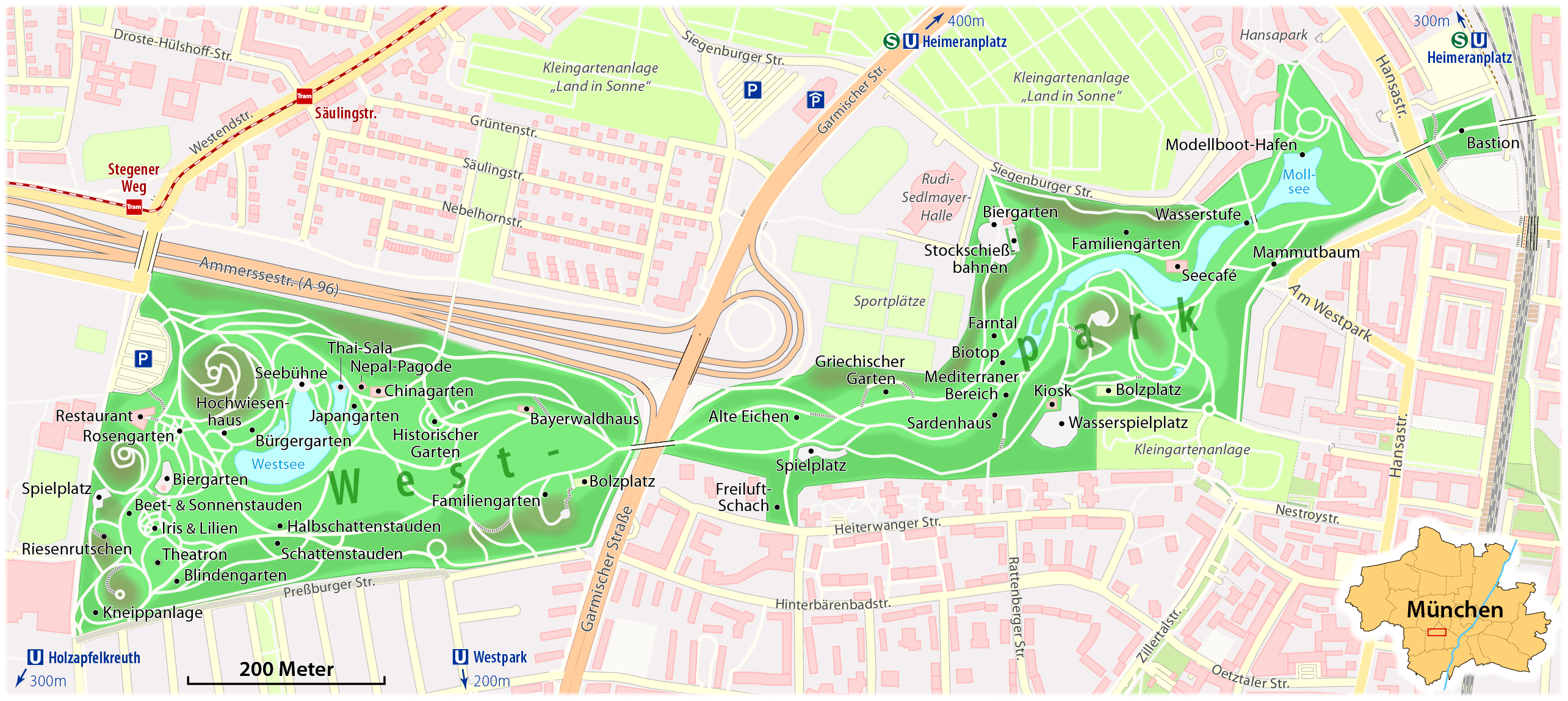
- Westpark in Munich
- Interactive map of Westpark
- Location: Munich, Bavaria, Germany
- Area: 0.69 km^{2} (0.27 sq mi)
- Created: 1983
- Status: Open year round

The Westpark is a large urban public park in Munich, Germany. It was designed by landscape architect Peter Kluska and completed in 1983. It hosted the International Garden Expo 83 that same year. The park covers an area of 720,000 m^{2} (7,750,016 sq ft) (178 acres) extending 2.6 km from east to west. The Garmischer Straße divides the park into an eastern and western section.

== Sights and attractions ==
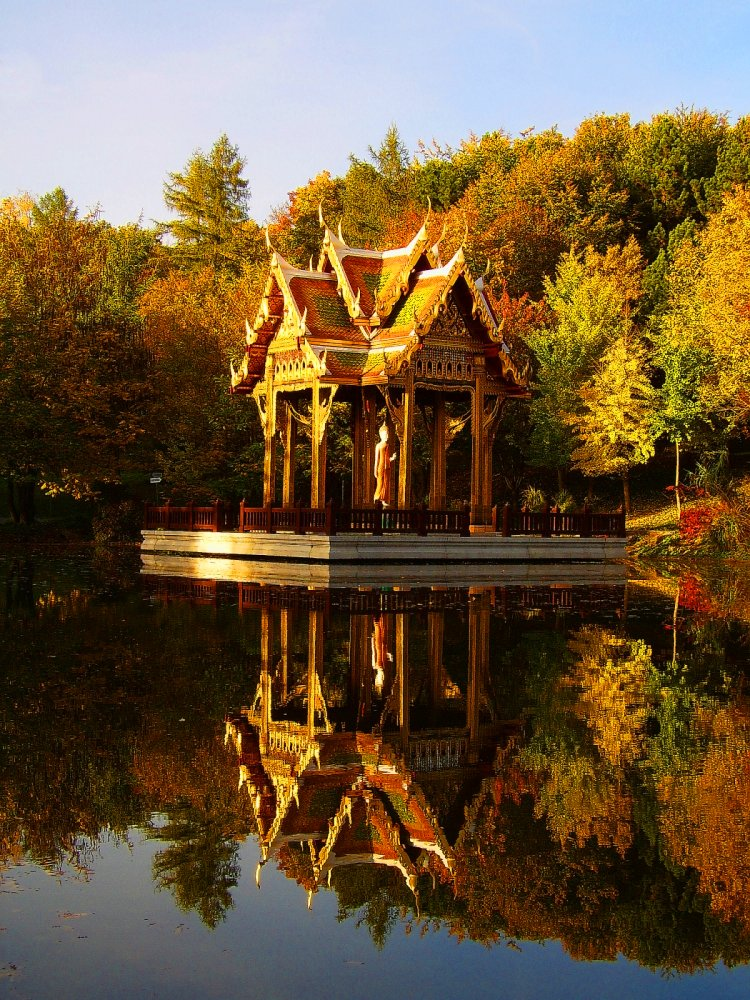
Thai Sala

=== Rose garden ===
The rose garden is made up of more than 20,000 roses and 500 different rose species. There also are two popular beer gardens.

=== Lake stage ===
The western lake features a stage area (Seebühne) hosting open air movie screenings, live music and theater shows during the summer season.

=== Asian gardens ===
Four of the originally 23 national gardens of the exhibit are preserved. The very first authentic Chinese garden in Europe is a walled garden that might have been constructed for an historic scholar. Around a pond the walkways leads along the four seasons and four parts of a lifetime. The Japanese garden was a gift from Munich's sister City Sapporo and combines elements from the Heian period. A Nepali pagoda was carved by 200 master carvers and transported to Munich. A free standing Thai-Sala hosts the first consecrated Gautama Buddha statue in Germany.

=== Mollsee ===
The Mollsee is an artificial lake situated in the eastern section of the park. It frequently attracts model boat enthusiasts.
