= Aidenbachstraße station =

Station of the Munich U-Bahn

Coordinates: 48°05′52″N 11°31′32″E

Aidenbachstraße
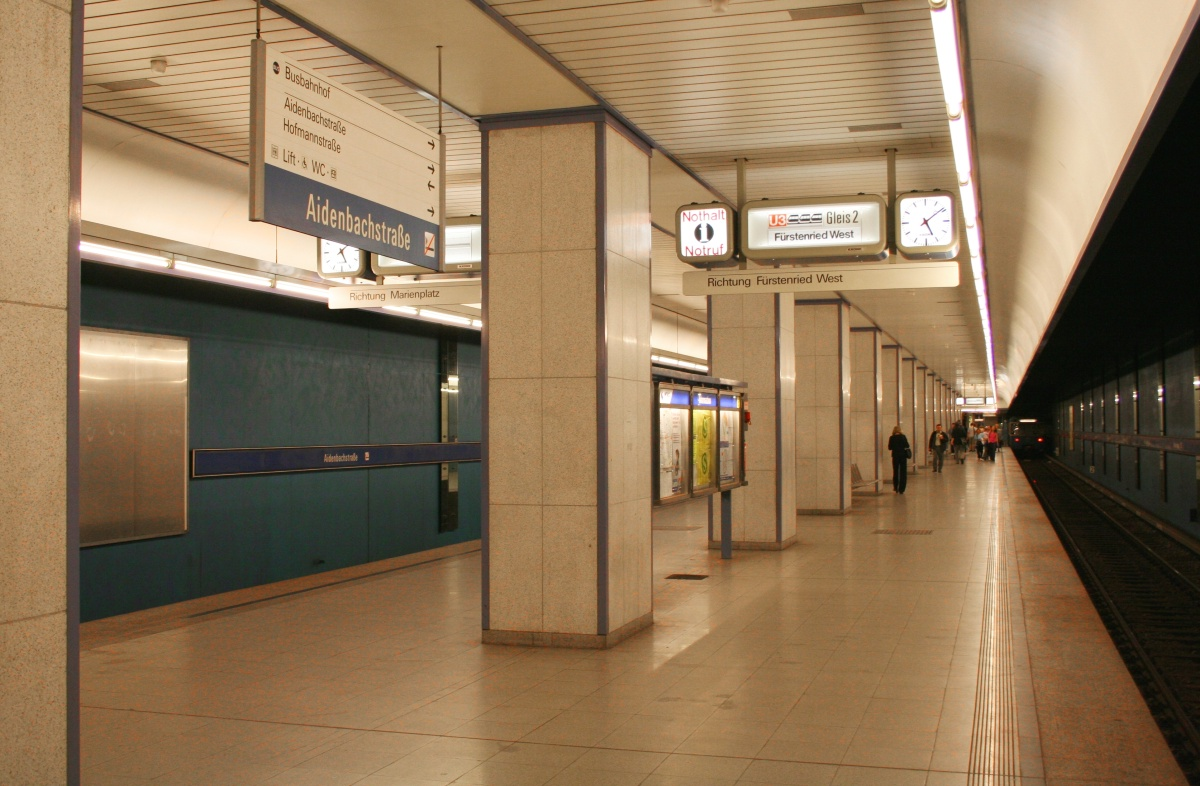

General information
- Connections: MVV buses

Construction
- Structure type: Underground
- Accessible: Yes

Other information
- Fare zone: : M

Services
Preceding station	Munich U-Bahn	Following station
Machtlfinger Straße towards Fürstenried West	U3	Obersendling towards Moosach
Location

Aidenbachstraße is an U-Bahn station in Munich on the U3. The station was opened on 28 October 1989.

In 2014, construction was expected to start on a 8.3 kilometres (5.2 mi) tangential extension of route 17 of the Munich tramway from its existing terminus at Romansplatz to an interchange at Aidenbachstraße station. A construction permit was granted in 2023, with full completion of the construction being expected in 2028.
