= Obersendling station =

Station of the Munich U-Bahn

Coordinates: 48°05′53″N 11°32′10″E

Obersendling
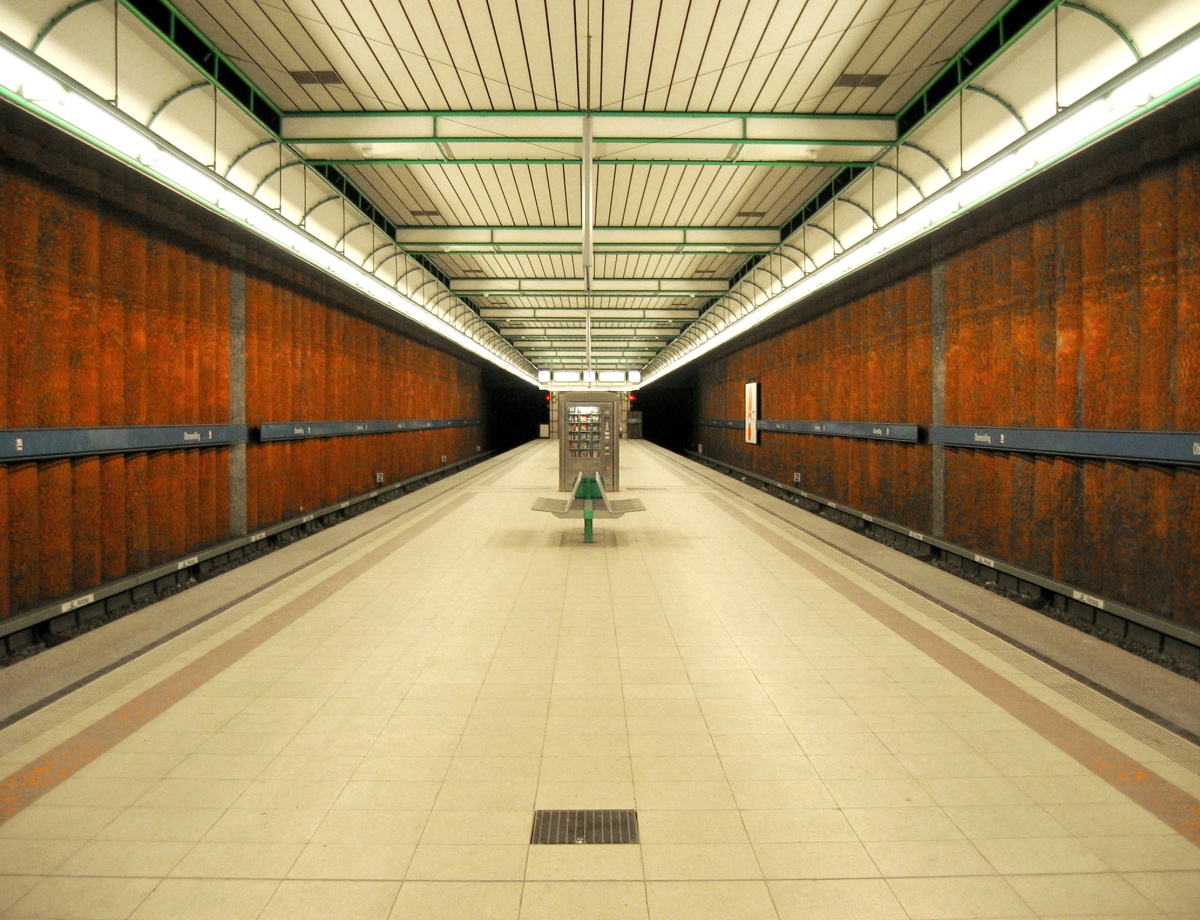

General information
- Connections: MVV buses Siemenswerke

Construction
- Structure type: Underground

Other information
- Fare zone: : M

Services
Preceding station	Munich U-Bahn	Following station
Aidenbachstraße towards Fürstenried West	U3	Thalkirchen towards Moosach
Location

Obersendling is an U-Bahn station in Munich, Germany on the U3. The Siemenswerke S-Bahn station is located around 500m south of this station.

Preceding station	Munich U-Bahn	Following station
Aidenbachstraße towards Fürstenried West	U3	Thalkirchen towards Moosach
