= Jón Kristinsson =

Icelandic architect (born 1936)

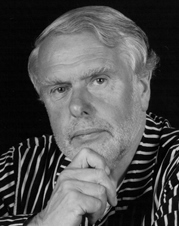
- Jón Kristinsson
- Born: May 7, 1936 (age 89); Reykjavík, Iceland
- Occupation: Architect
- Practice: Architecten- en ingenieursbureau kristinsson bv
- Buildings: Minimum energy housing development - 184 houses in Schiedam

Jón Kristinsson (born May 7, 1936, Reykjavík) is an Icelandic architect.

== Biography ==
Kristinsson matriculated from Menntaskólinn í Reykjavík in 1956. He then studied architecture at Delft University of Technology.

In 1966, Kristinsson together with his architect colleague and wife Riet Reitsema co-founded an architecture and engineering office in Deventer.

During the period 1992–2001 Kristinsson together with Kees Duijvestein held a joint professorship in Environmental technique and design in the Faculty of Architecture at Delft University of Technology. Following retirement in 2001, Kristinsson has worked on innovations at the Architecten- en ingenieursbureau kristinsson bv office in Deventer.

In 2024, he was awarded the Order of the Falcon for his contributions to for pioneering work in ecological building design on the international stage.

== Major building designs ==
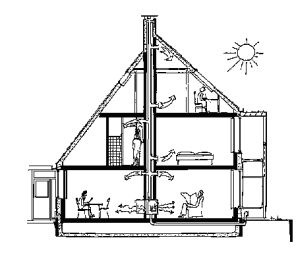
Minimum-energy house concept

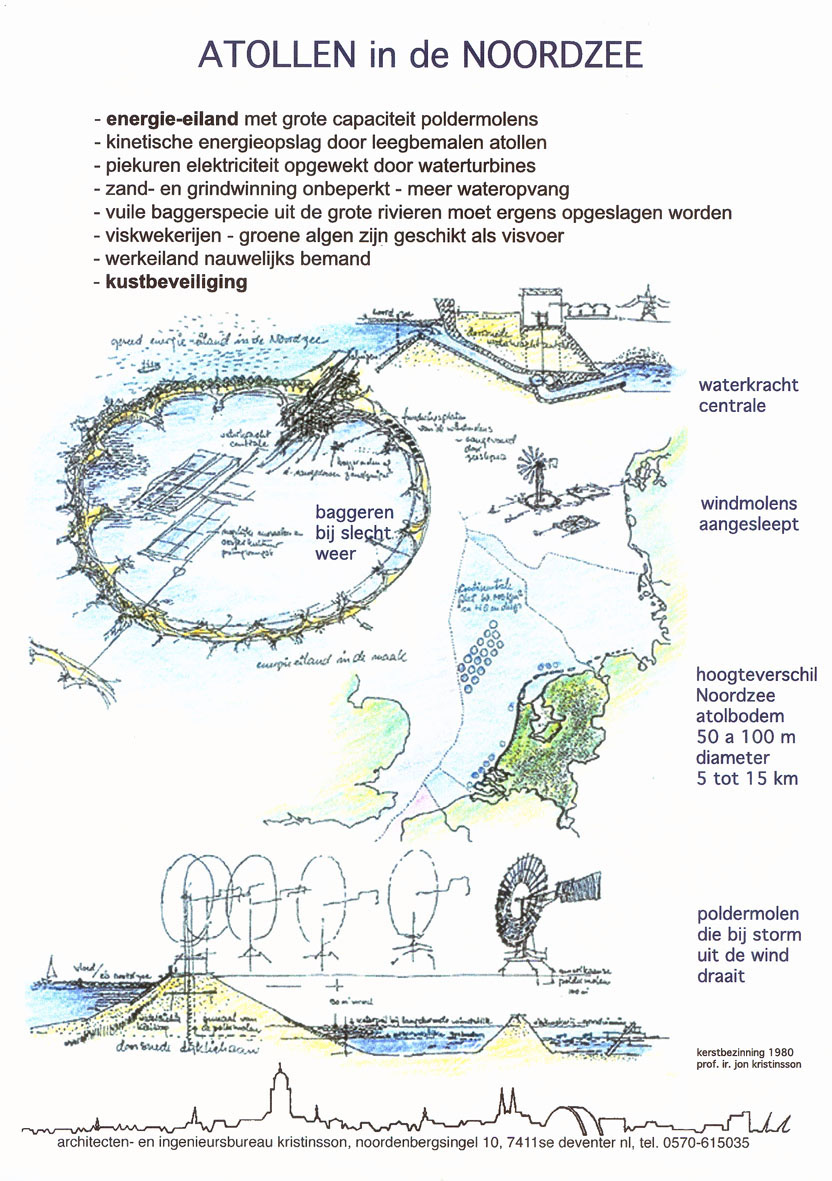
Project atoll in the North Sea

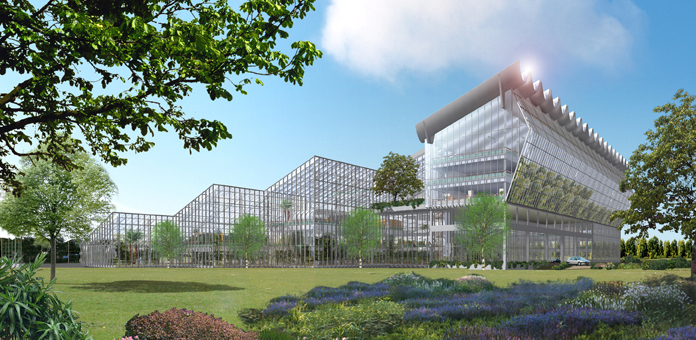
Project Floriade 2012: the largest building in the Nederland

- Town Hall Lelystad (1976) an integrated design of a self-supporting building. World's first seasonal heat storage in wet ground, parabolic solar collectors, balanced ventilation with heat regain, humidifying by plants and spring fountains, insulated shutters at night and acoustic of a concert hall. (Not built)
- Minimum-energy housing development 1979-83 in Schiedam. 184 social houses were built. The project altered the building tradition in the Netherlands. Some of the innovative design includes: Airtight building, wall insulation on the outside, foundation and roof insulation. In the kitchen balanced ventilation with heat recovery in the hood of the cooker.
- In 1980: Atolls in the North Sea pumped dry by windmills/watermills as an alternative for atomic power.
- The energy producing greenhouse and the "edible city" are development concepts with 2ha glasshouse with seasonal heatstorage that heat 200 properly designed houses.
- Floriade 2012 the tenannual horticultural exposition in Venlo the Netherlands

== Bibliography ==
- Kristinsson Jon Architecten- en ingenieursbureau Kristinsson Jubileumboek. Deventer 1996;
- Kristinsson J., Exergieprojecten A.H.H. Schmitz, P.J.W. Singendonk (ed.), TVVL Magazine 28 10, 1999.
- Kristinsson, Jon Light urban development. The Architecture Annual 1997–1998. Bekkering, Henco, Hans de Jonge Klaske Havik (Eds.) Delft University of Technology. Rotterdam: 010 Publishers, 1999. Broschiert. ISBN 90-6450-358-3
- Kristinsson, Jon Breathing window and healthy ventilation in buildings. The CIB 2003 International Conference on Smart and Sustainable Built Environment (SASBE2003) Brisbane 2003. ISBN 90-75365-58-6 pdf
- Kristinsson, Jon Smart and energetic architecture. International Conference "Bridging to the Future" - Bridging energy planning and spatial design strategies - Beurs van Amsterdam, June 8, 2006. pdf
