= Weerwater (novel) =

2015 novel by Renate Dorrestein

- First edition
- Author: Renate Dorrestein
- Language: Dutch
- Genre: novel
- Publisher: Uitgeverij Podium
- Publication date: 2015
- Publication place: Netherlands
- Media type: Print
- ISBN: 978-90-5759-712-1 (Paperback)

Weerwater is a dystopian novel written by Renate Dorrestein. She was invited by the municipality of Almere to become writer-in-residence and write about the city. This was part of the effort to strengthen the cultural image of Almere.

== Writer's block ==
Renate suffered from a writer's block in the era she was invited to become writer-in-residence but accepted the challenge nonetheless and used her protagonist as a storyteller of an imagined disaster threatening Almere.

== Structure of the story ==
The writer cast herself as part of the book, writing about being invited by the municipality to write about the city. Further on, her task gets renamed as town clerk, which was more fitting given the medieval circumstances Almere fell into. In Maastricht she bid farewell to her loved ones, since she'd retreat to a place where nobody wanted to be found dead.

== The two extraordinary events in Almere ==
- On the Sunday of Renate's arrival there is an apocalyptic summer storm on the city. Violent hail and incessant thunderstorms with gusts of up to 250 km per hour. On the Monday the damage seems to be relatively low. The KNMI completely missed the storm but on Monday the commuters leave the city again with some delay by train and car to their work, as far as they were not on holiday.
- While the repair work starts on Monday, the electricity is completely switched off after a flash of light. Soon it appears that the power never returns via the electricity grid. The city falls back to medieval conditions. Moreover, the city is completely enclosed by a dense fog on its municipal boundaries. People leave from Almere but nobody comes back into the city. In this, the story shows similarities to the novel of Stephen King: 'Under the Dome'

== Fate of Almere ==
Most residents of Almere believe their city is the only one that has survived the end of the world. This is because all connections to the world outside of Almere are severed and nobody is coming back into the city. The population is rapidly falling from around 200,000 to 5,000, mostly women. Infectious diseases such as cholera, Typhus and diphtheria claim their merciless toll.

Yet there is also an undercurrent, worded by Lazaar Lazaar, who thinks that a central government undertook a horrible experiment with the city, which was once won from water. The climate has become tropical and the days are equally long all year round and the twilight is correspondingly short. In particular, young men run fast through the fog banks surrounding the municipal territory.

== Course of the story ==
After the two disasters, the city council is taken over by the only remaining alderman of Culture and three obscure PVV council members. After his death, the head of the prison takes his place. Renate is also closely involved in decision-making as a city writer. Due to the loss of electricity and a lack of men, the standard of living falls back quickly. Food is becoming a problem, even though the city had opportunities to provide food for its 200,000 inhabitants, it is now unable to feed 5000.

The escaped 300 male detainees turn out to be both a curse and a blessing. They are divided into useful (200) and scum (100) by the prison director. The last group withdraws voluntarily in 'The Castle' and terrorizes from there to an increasingly lesser extent the population, which has largely withdrawn in Almere Centrum around the Weerwater.

The usable prisoners are appointed as the head of 200 clans, called 'Close Family', in which alternative families are formed by lottery. Large themes for the survivors are growing food and making babies, which is almost hopeless with malnourished women. Moreover, the major life demand that remains outside Almere remains unresolved for all residents.

The discovery of an approximately six months old baby girl Ally suggests that there is still life outside of Almere. It is unclear, however, how it is that the city is not undermined after the power grid has failed. Clan heads take control of the city and find their old prison director willing to test whether the fog wall still prevents return to the city. If this Jacob Krikke does not return, a more positive mood returns to the city. The survivors still stand alone. As city writer, Renate sends a message to the outside world via bottle mail.
