= Floriade 2012 =

Exposition in Venlo, Netherlands

Coordinates: 51.4058°N 6.1228°E

EXPO 2012 Venlo
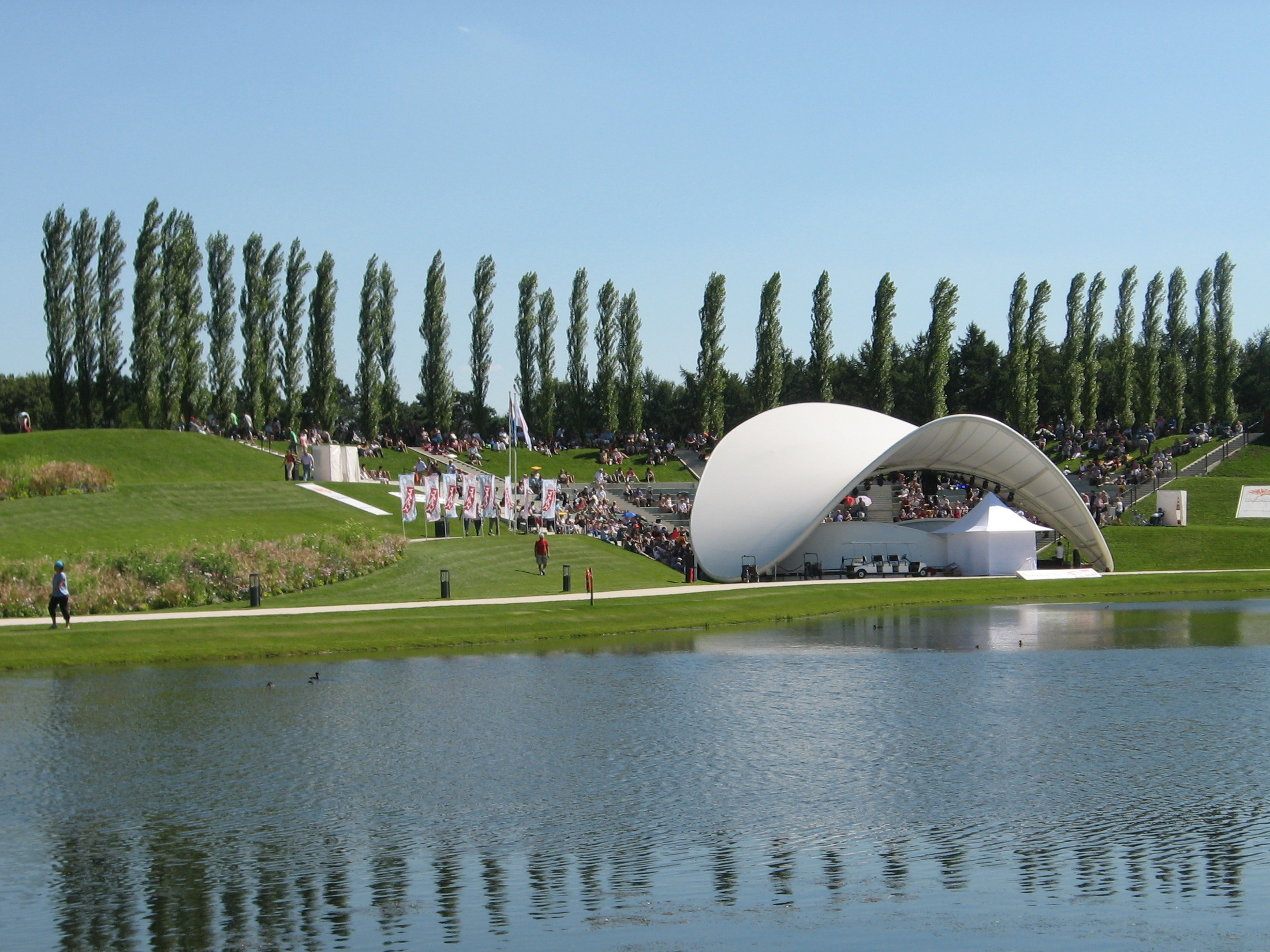
- Floriade theater

Overview
- BIE-class: Horticultural exposition
- Name: Floriade 2012
- Motto: Living Nature
- Area: 66 hectares (160 acres)

Participant(s)
- Countries: 25

Location
- Country: Netherlands
- City: Venlo

Timeline
- Opening: 5 April 2012
- Closure: 7 October 2012

Horticultural expositions
- Previous: Expo 2006 in Chiang Mai
- Next: Expo 2016 in Antalya

Specialized expositions
- Previous: Expo 2008 in Zaragoza
- Next: Expo 2017 in Astana

Universal expositions
- Previous: Expo 2010 in Shanghai
- Next: Expo 2015 in Milan

Simultaneous
- Specialized: Expo 2012

Internet
- Website: website

The Floriade 2012 was a Dutch horticultural exposition held in Venlo, Netherlands. It was the sixth Floriade and was held from 5 April to 7 October 2012. The Floriade 2012 was opened by Queen Beatrix. The exposition's theme and slogan was "Be part of the theatre in nature; get closer to the quality of life".

== Preparation ==
The Dutch Horticultural Council selected a number of candidates starting in June 2004 for the organization of the Floriade 2012. The official candidates were:

- Arnhem
- Drechtsteden (Alblasserdam, Dordrecht, 'S-Gravendeel, Hendrik-Ido-Ambacht, Papendrecht, Sliedrecht, Zwijndrecht)
- NoordWest 8 (a partnership of several organizations in the field of thirty municipalities in the region of Alkmaar, Hoorn and Den Helder)
- Region Venlo
- Rotterdam
- Tilburg / Brabantstad
- District Amsterdam-Noord

The municipalities of Rotterdam and Arnhem had in earlier decided to withdraw the candidacy because the financial risks were deemed too high. In Drechtsteden, the five participating municipalities failed to make a positive decision. In Drechtsteden, the concerns of high costs, environmental impact and disruption of Sunday rest were reasons against hosting the festival. The board of the Dutch Horticultural Council announced on 8 December 2004 that the plan of the only remaining candidate, Venlo, met the criteria.

The official preview event, named "Floriade Invites", hosted 22,000 visitors on 20 June 2010. A cable car by Doppelmayer was part of the Floriade Preview Centre which operated in 2011. The Floriade, which was designed by landscape architect John Boon, made prominent use of Cradle-to-cradle design.

== The festival ==
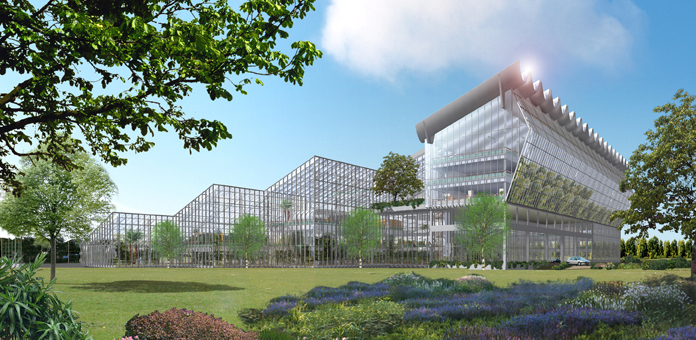
Villa Flora, greenest building in the Netherlands, designed by Jón Kristinsson

Leaflet describing the Villa Flora

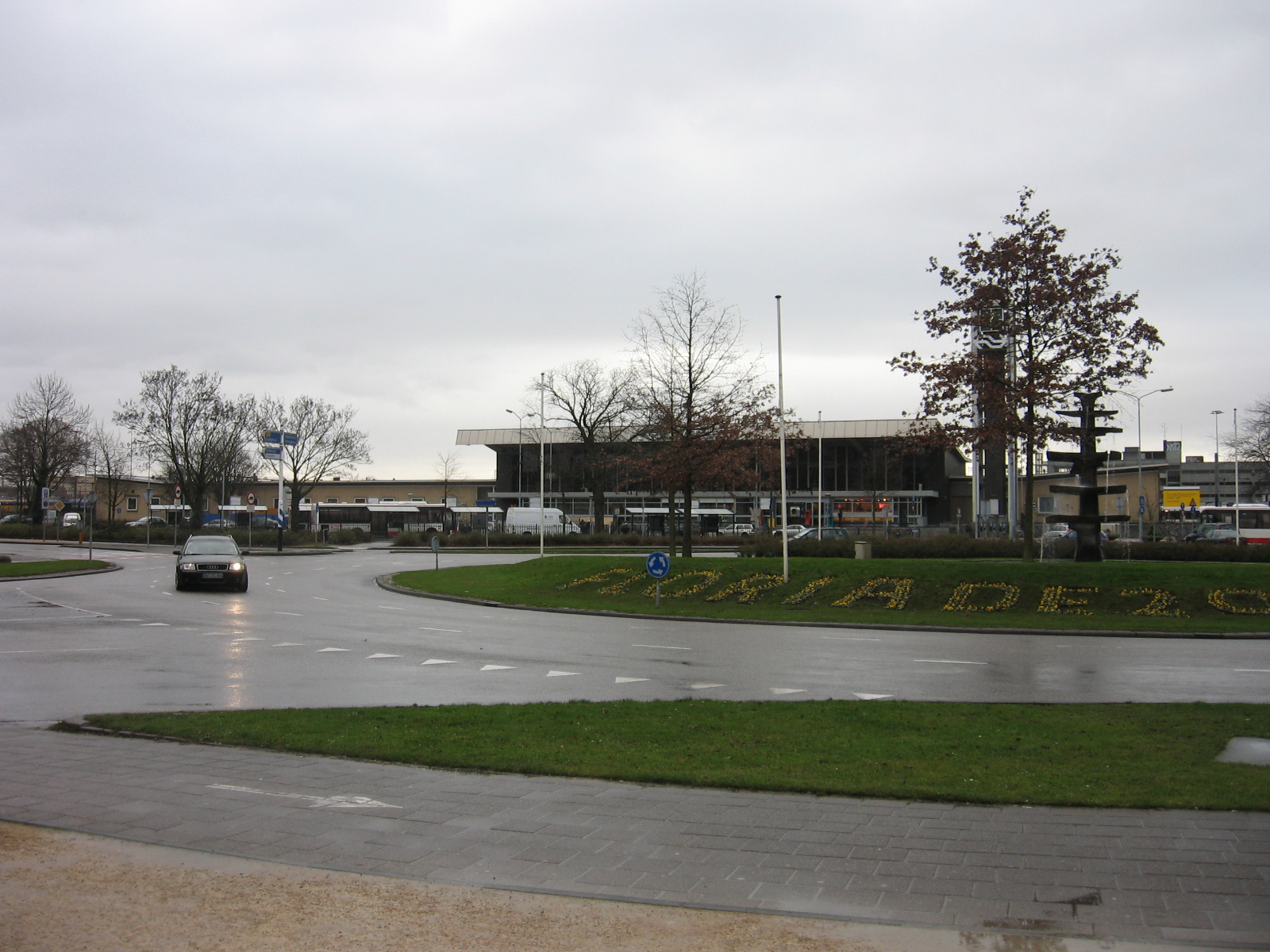
Queens Square in Venlo during the Floriade

The Floriade Park covered a total of 66 hectares (163 acres), including 22 hectares (55 acres) of forest, two and a half acres of buildings and four acres of water. Organizers of the festival planted 1,700 trees, 20,000 shrubs, 200,000 perennials, 65,000 water plants, one and a half million bulbs and 95,000 annuals. There were 60 charging stations for electric cars in the parking lot of the Floriade. The park consisted of five themed areas, separated by woodland. Each theme area had its own decor, program and activities.

- Relax & Heal
- Green Engine
- Education & Innovation
- Environment
- World Show Stage

The Floriade contained two imposing buildings. The design was created between 2007 and 2010 and the first tree planting was in 2008. The same year also saw construction of the theme field, Relax & Heal, and a year later the shrubs were planted. In 2010, the perennials were placed and planted borders. The last theme field Green Engine was built.

Villa Flora was one of the biggest crowd pullers at the Floriade. The fully energy-neutral building is a symbol of sustainability, innovation and the green economy. Villa Flora is a design by the architect Jón Kristinsson. The Innova has been designed by former government architect Jo Coenen. The building is 70 meters (230') high and has 16 floors, with exhibition rooms on the 16th floor, and has been redeveloped to become part of the Venlo GreenPark, a green business park. A 1,100 meter (1200 yard) long cable car system running through the park opened on 16 April 2011.

Queen Beatrix visited the Floriade a second time during the state visit of President Abdullah Gül of Turkey, in which the president opened the Turkish pavilion.

== Aftermath and legacy ==
Management had estimated a total of 2.3 million visitors would come to Floriade 2012. During the closing ceremony on 7 October 2012, CEO Paul Beck announced a total 2,046,684 guests were welcomed. Initially media falsely reported a loss of €9 million. In 2013 Floriade reported a loss of €5.5 million, later this was adjusted to €5.4 million. The legacy and spin-off of the expo were valued at €350 million and local and regional entrepreneurs noted an increase in spending during and after the expo. The site of the expo is now home to Greenport Venlo, a variety of new companies are now located in the former entrance building and Villa Flora and large logistics centers occupy the site of the former parking lot.

== Gallery ==
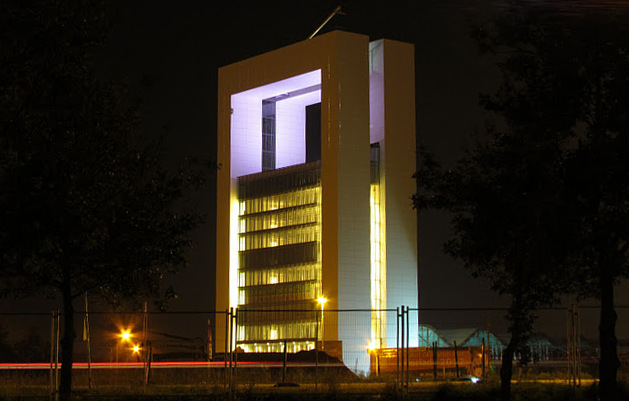
The "Innovation Tower", Floriade entrance

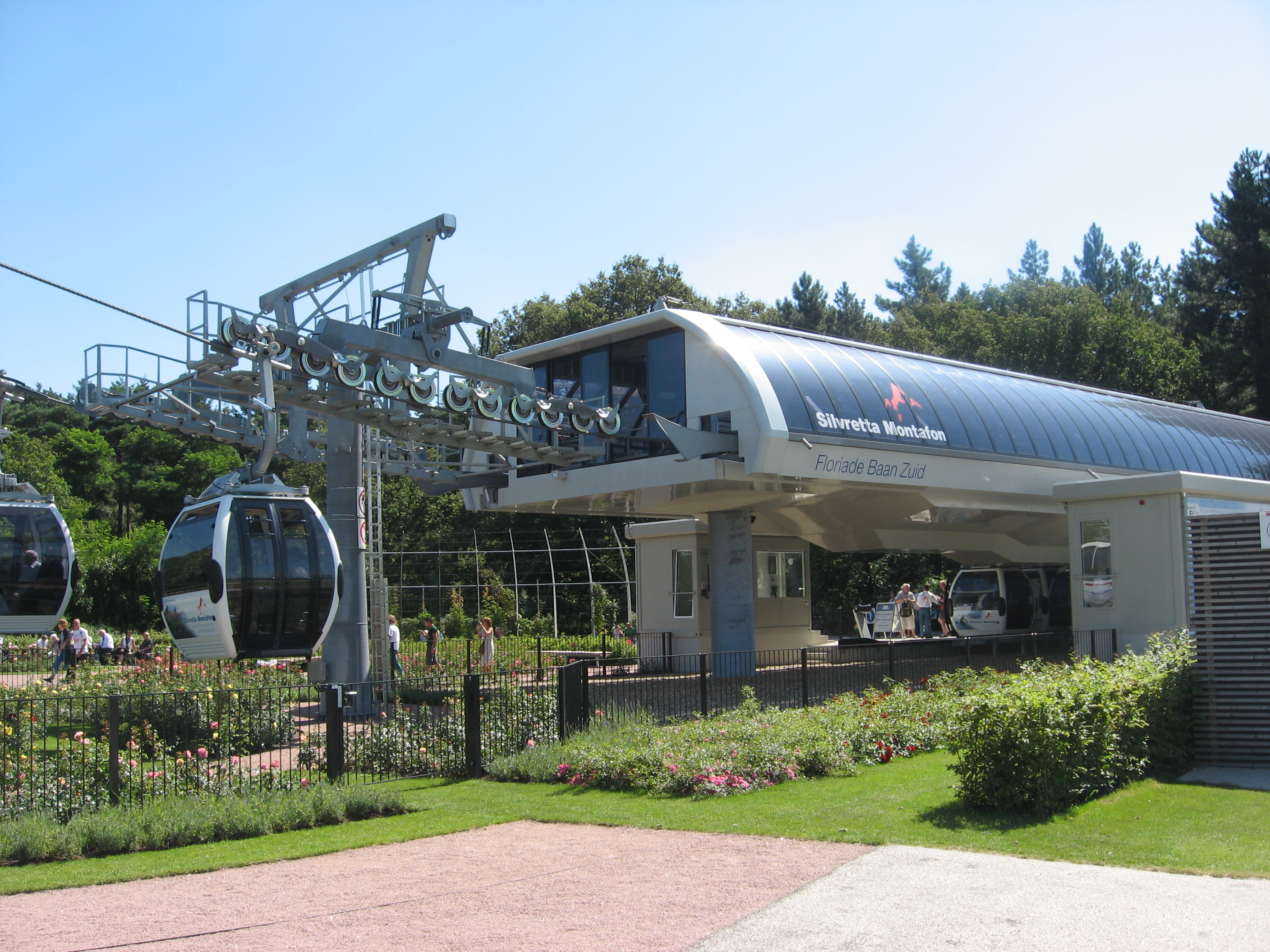
Cable car station

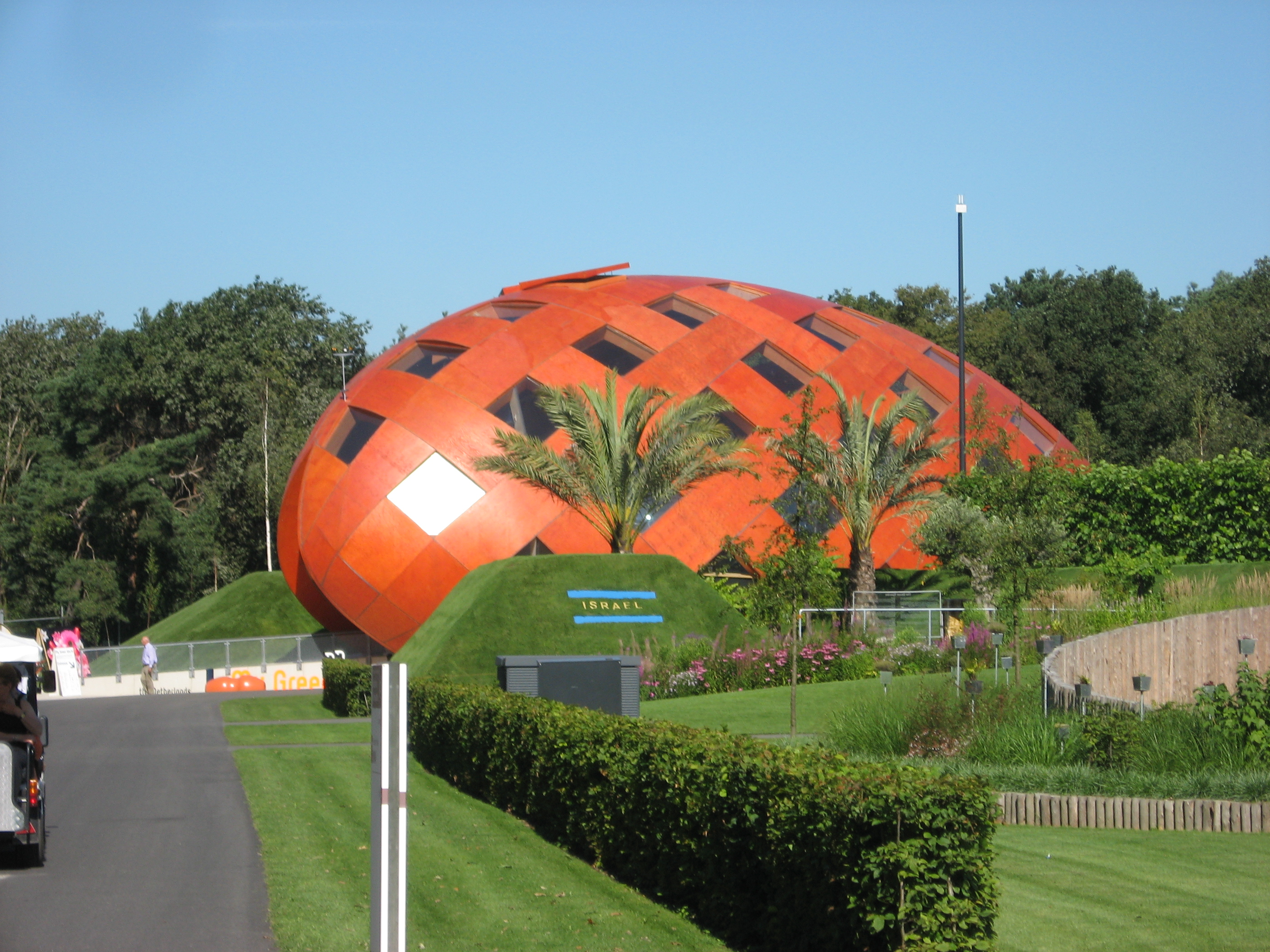
Netherlands' pavilion

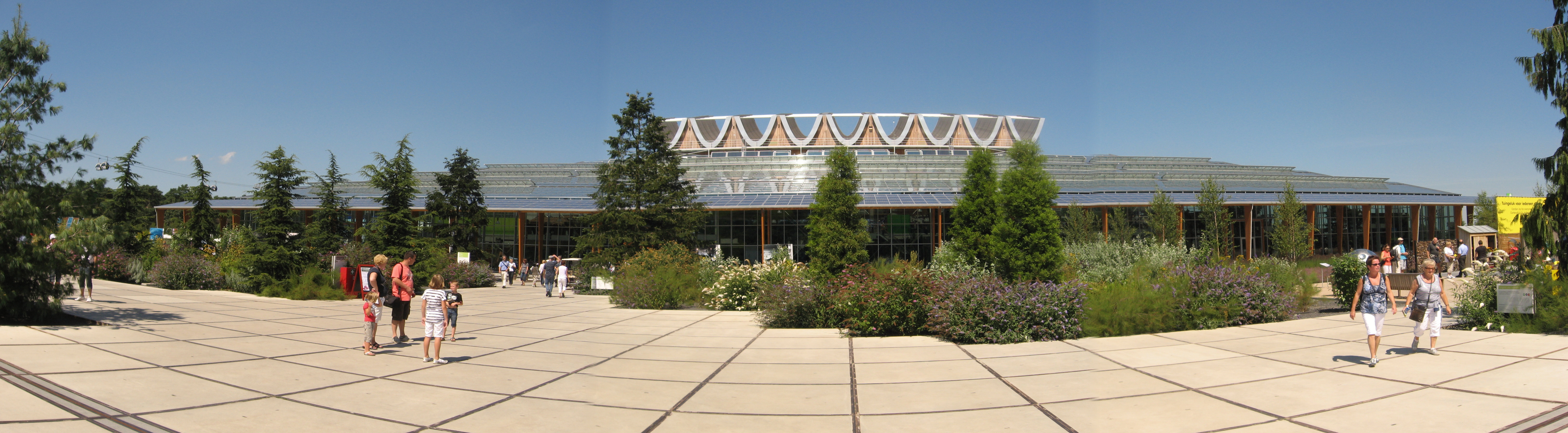
Villa Flora
