= Floriade (Netherlands) =

Exhibition and garden festival

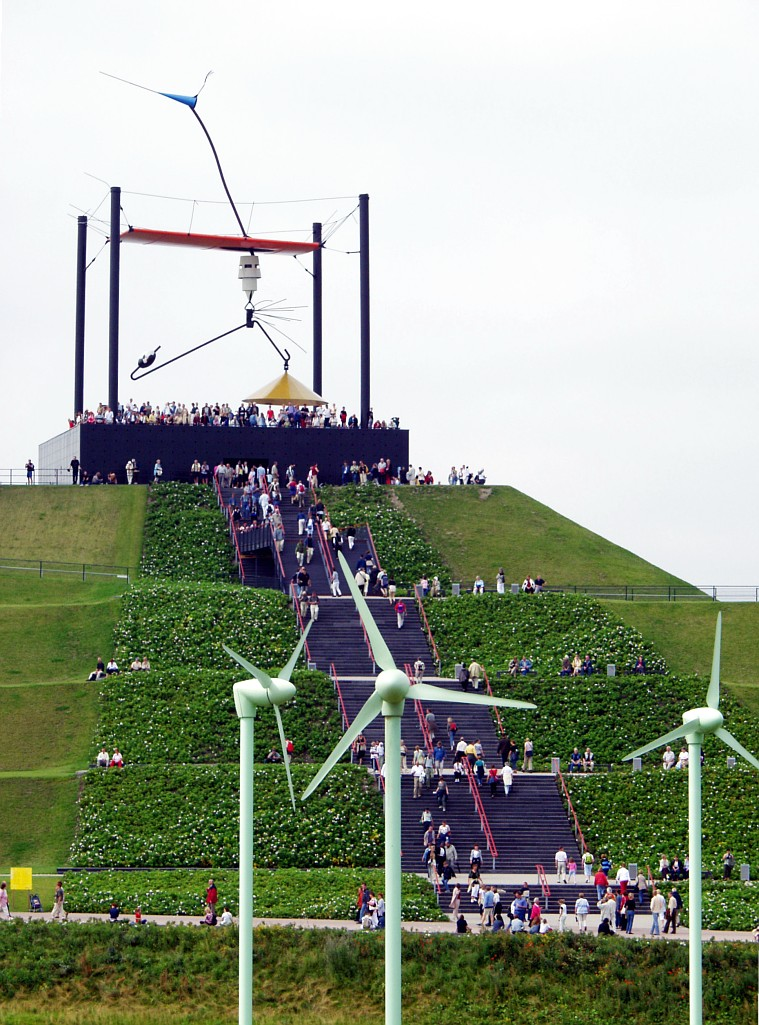
Visitors on "Big Spotters Hill" at Floriade 2002.

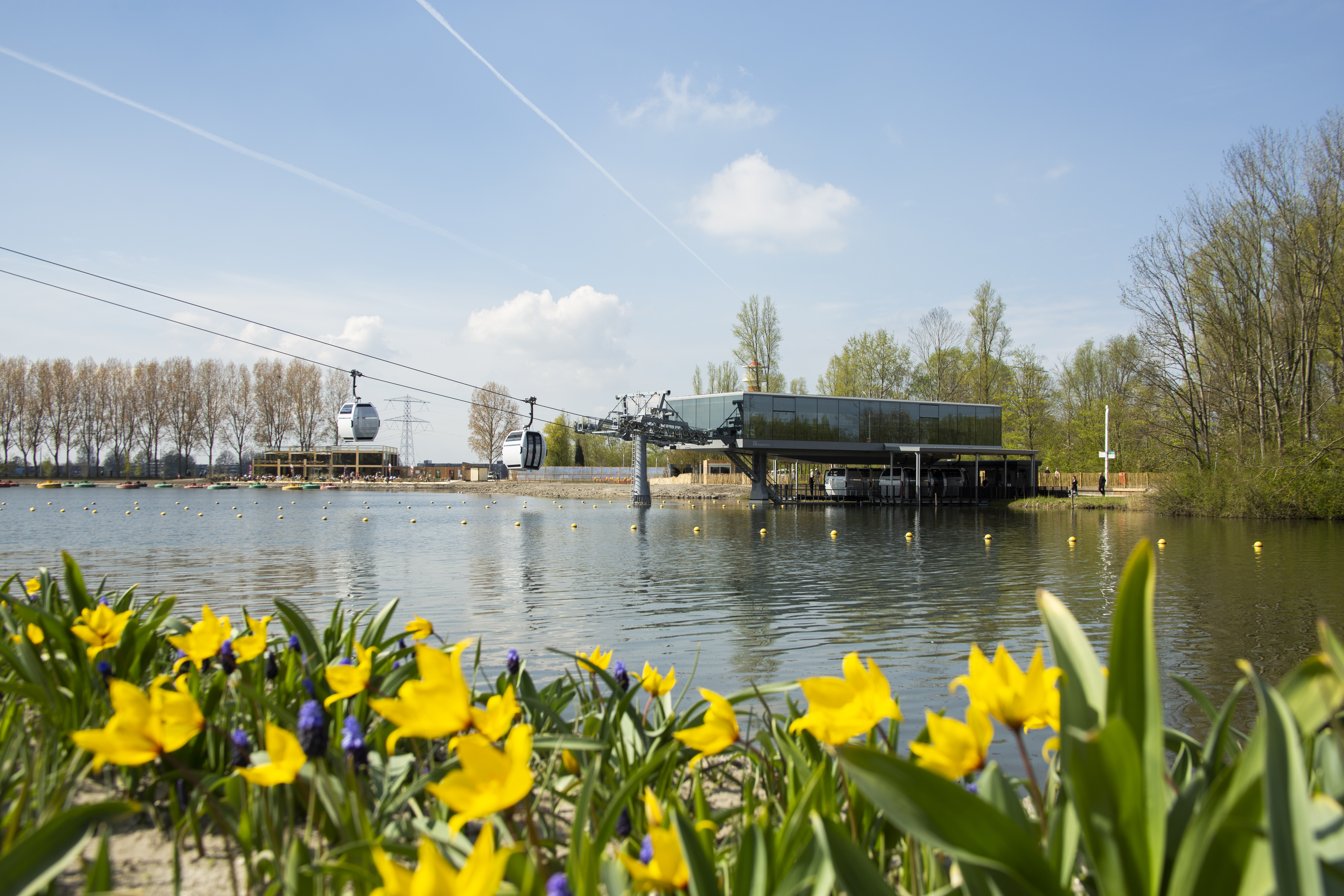
Cable Car at Floriade 2022.

Floriade was an international exhibition and garden festival, held every 10 years in the Netherlands. All the Floriades were World Horticultural Expositions and they were listed as A1 category exhibitions by the International Association of Horticultural Producers and hence recognised by the Bureau International des Expositions. The last event, Floriade 2022, was held in Almere.

== History ==
Prior to the Floriade in the Netherlands, flower and garden shows were called Flora Exhibitions held at Groenendaal park in Heemstede in 1925, 1935 and 1953, and earlier in 1910 in the Haarlemmerhout in Haarlem. The first Floriade was held in Rotterdam in Het Park with the Euromast observation tower being erected to mark the event.

== Organization ==
The Floriade was coordinated by the Dutch Horticultural Council which was founded in 1908 and aims to strengthen the image of the Dutch horticulture and to promote exports. The Floriade's location varied and it was awarded to a city after a bidding phase.

== Editions ==
Floriade	City	Venue	Date	Edition	Motto
Floriade 1960	Rotterdam	Het Park	25 March – September 1960	1	
Floriade 1972	Amsterdam	Amstelpark and Beatrixpark	30 March – 1 October 1972	5	
Floriade 1982	Amsterdam	Gaasperpark	8 April – 10 October 1982	9	
Floriade 1992	Zoetermeer	Rokkeveen	9 April – 10 October 1992	13	
Floriade 2002	Haarlemmermeer	Haarlemmermeerse Woods	6 April – 20 October 2002	16	Feel the art of nature
Floriade 2012	Venlo	Venlo Greenpark	6 April – 7 October 2012	19	Be part of the theatre in nature; get closer to the quality of life.
Floriade 2022	Almere	Weerwater	14 April – 9 October 2022	23	Growing Green Cities

== Recent Floriades ==
=== 1992 Zoetermeer ===
The 1992 Floriade was held in Zoetermeer and ran from 9 April to 10 October. The event was held on converted pasture outside the newtown of Zoetermeer, covered 168 acres and had participants from more than 20 countries.

=== 2002 Haarlemmermeer ===
The 2002 Floriade was held in Haarlemmermeer with a theme of Contribution of Horticulture in the quality of life in the 21st century. It ran from 5 April to 20 October, covered 65 ha and had 30 participating countries

=== 2012 Venlo Floriade ===
The Floriade 2012 was held from 5 April to 7 October 2012, in Venlo. The sixth Floriade and nineteenth AIPH world horticultural exposition, the Floriade spanned 66 acres and hosted 25 countries.

=== 2022 Almere ===
The Floriade 2022 was held in Almere with the masterplan designed by MVRDV.
