= Floriade 2022 =

World horticultural exposition

EXPO 2022 Almere

Overview
- BIE-class: Horticultural exposition
- Name: Floriade Amsterdam - Almere 2022
- Motto: Growing Green Cities
- Area: 60 hectares (150 acres)
- Visitors: 2 million (expected), 693,722 (actual)
- Organized by: Hans Bakker (director)

Location
- Country: Netherlands
- City: Almere
- Venue: Weerwater

Timeline
- Opening: 14 April 2022
- Closure: 9 October 2022

Horticultural expositions
- Previous: Expo 2019 in Beijing
- Next: Expo 2023 in Doha

Specialized expositions
- Previous: Expo 2017 in Astana
- Next: Expo 2027 in Belgrade

Universal expositions
- Previous: Expo 2020 in Dubai
- Next: Expo 2025 in Osaka

Internet
- Website: English language section of official website

Floriade Expo Amsterdam - Almere 2022 was a Dutch horticultural exposition held in Almere, Netherlands. It is the seventh Floriade, held from 14 April to 9 October 2022. On 15 November 2017, Floriade Expo 2022 was officially recognized as a horticultural exhibition by the Bureau International des Expositions. The theme of the Expo is "Growing Green Cities", which focuses on the need to combine nature and cities.

Construction of the site in Weerwater, Almere started in February 2020 by Amvest and Dura Vermeer. The 2022 bid for Floriade was awarded in 2012, a few weeks before the closing of the event in Venlo. NTR, the organizing body of the event informed the media in October 2021 that no decision had been made as to whether an eighth Floriade would be held, possibly ending a tradition. After the Expo 2022 had an operating loss of more than €100 million and the visitor targets were not met, the decision was made not to organise a Floriade in the future.

== History ==
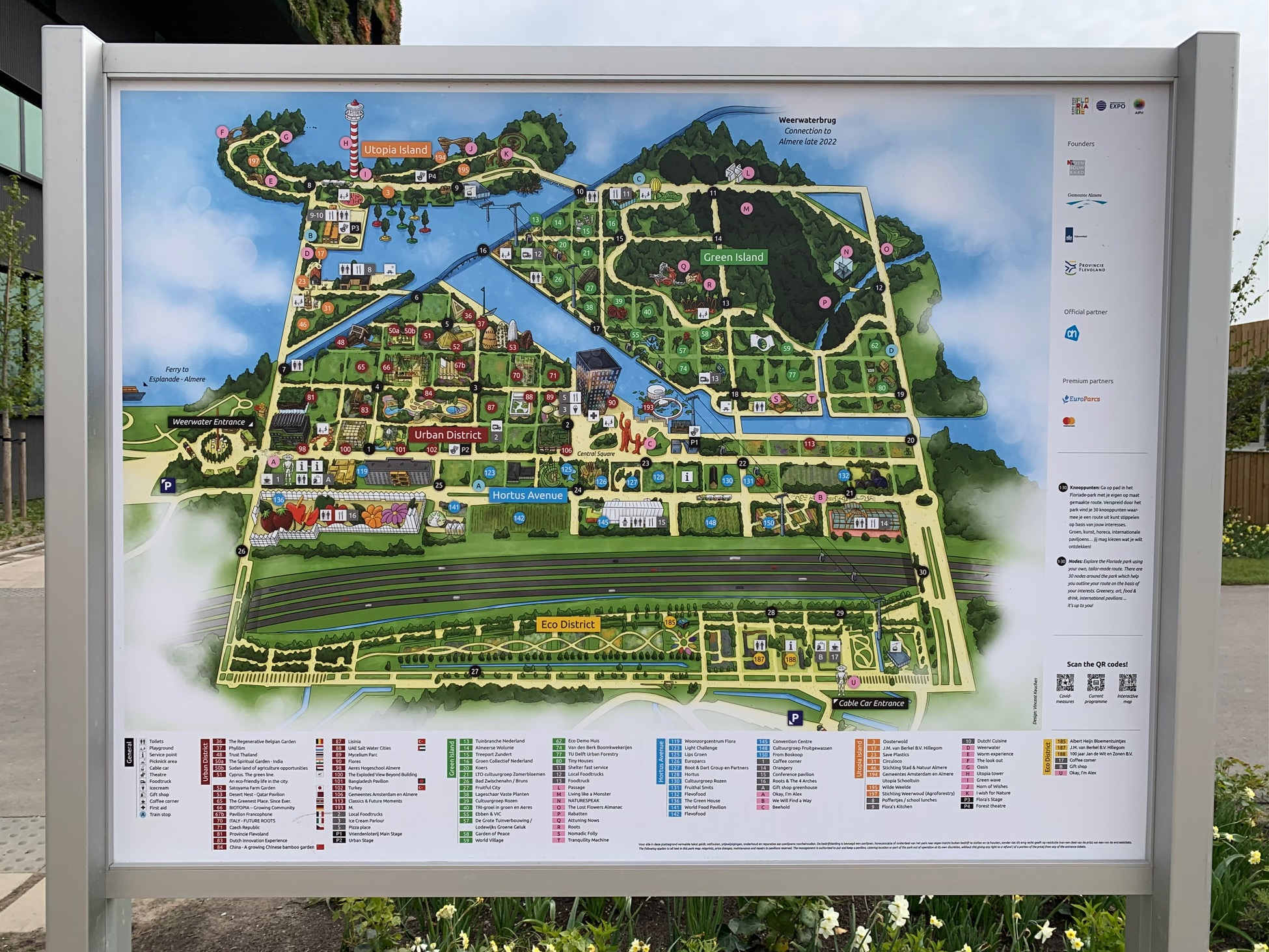
Map of the 2022 Floriade Expo

=== Nomination ===
The candidacy for hosting Floriade Expo 2022 was opened in September 2011. By the closing date of 1 December 2011, seven candidates had applied: the Rivierengebied region, the Noord-Holland-Noord region, the municipality of Almere, the municipality of Amsterdam, the Boskoop region, the municipality of Groningen and the Coöperatie Flevoland 2022 from Lelystad.

After an initial selection round, the Dutch Horticultural Council (NTR) made a decision to narrow down the selection to four candidates. The NTR tasked the four candidates to make a bid book in which the plans would be worked out in more detail. This bid book had to be submitted by 1 July 2012.

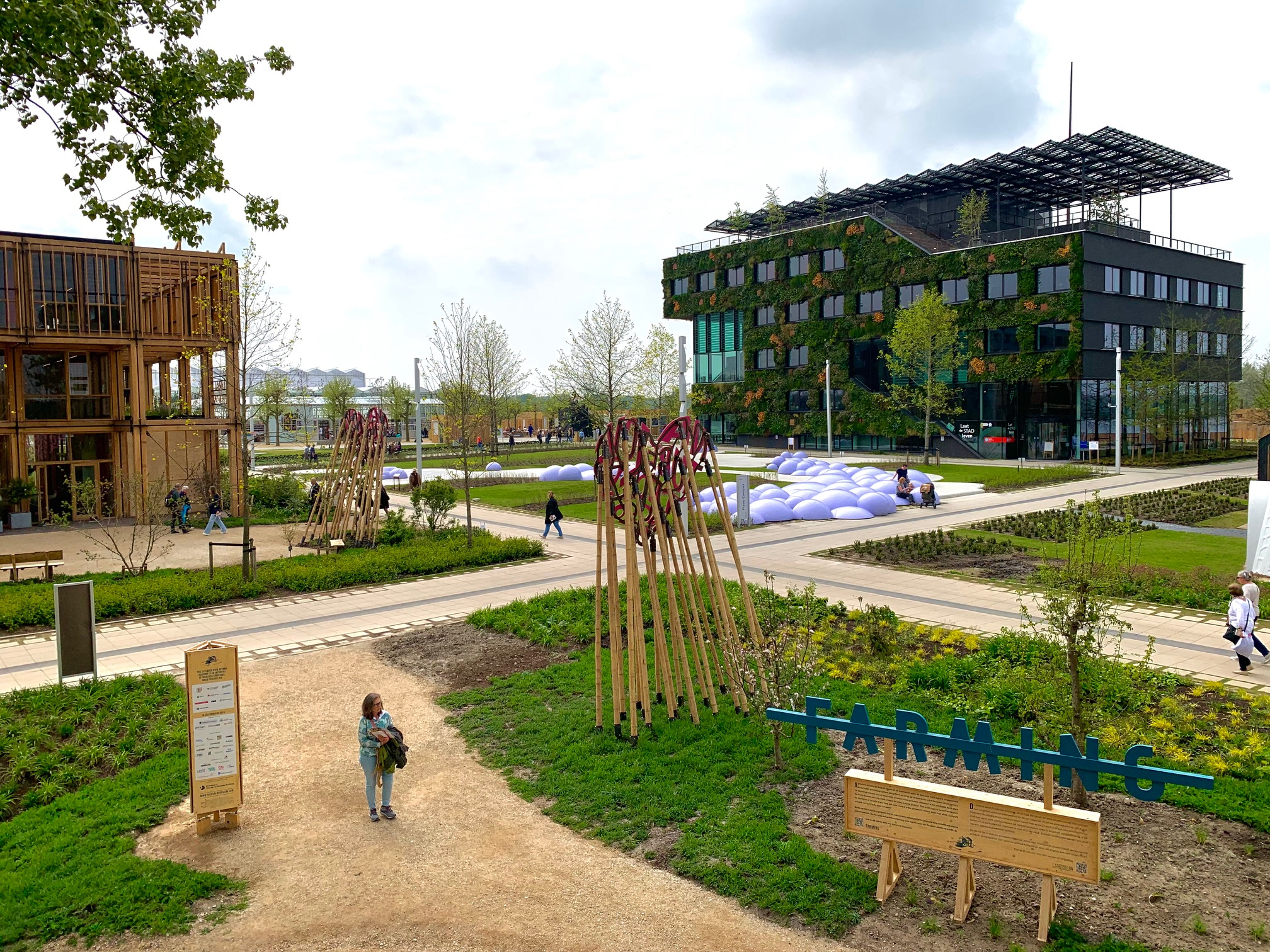
View of the Urban District

The four candidates for the Floriade 2022 were:

- Almere
- Amsterdam
- The Boskoop region
- Groningen

During a meeting at Keukenhof Castle in Lisse on 24 September 2012, the NTR announced that the Floriade 2022 would be organised by the municipality of Almere.

=== Construction ===
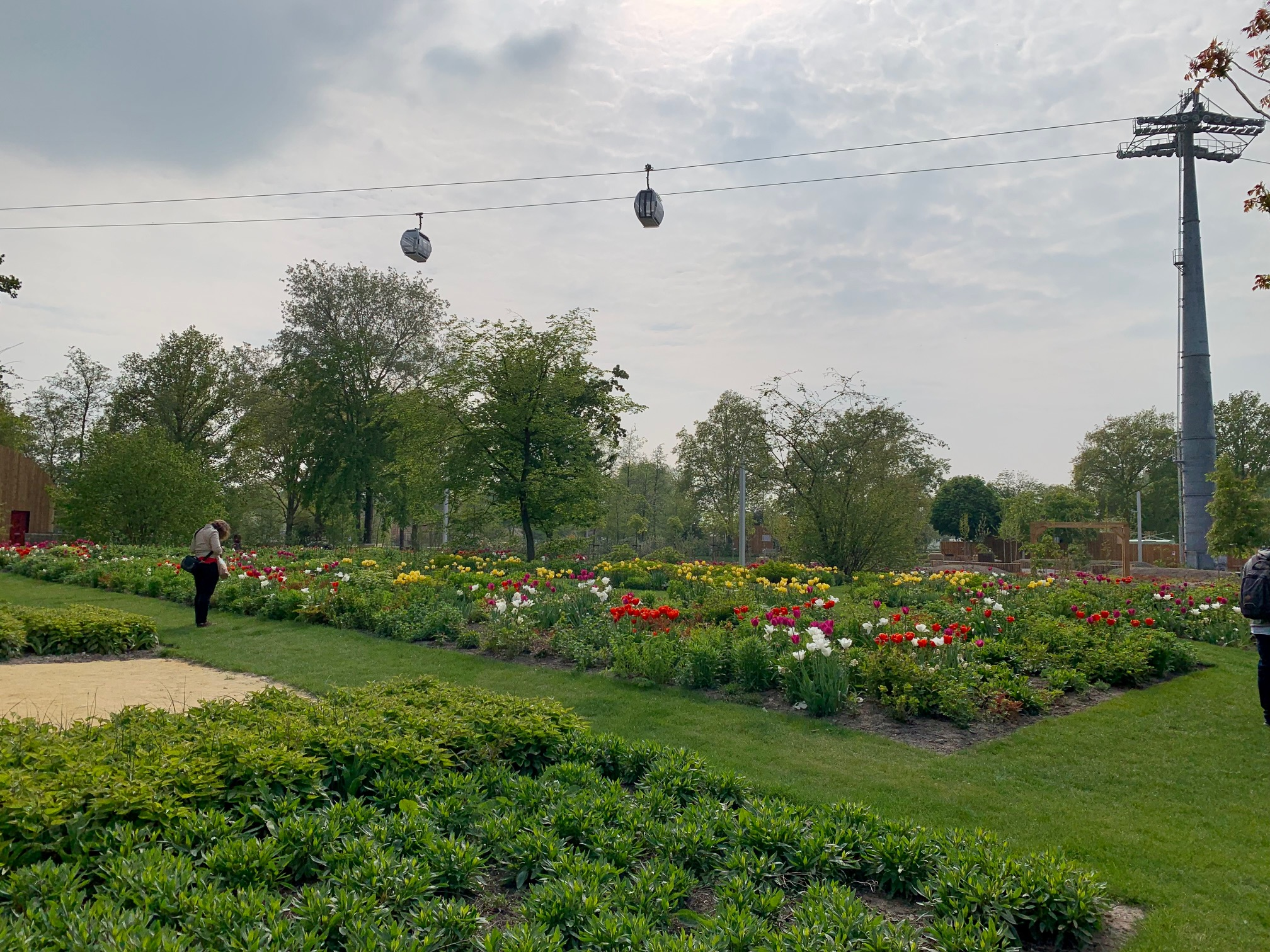
Tulip gardens on Green Island

Work started on the Floriade site on 14 February 2020. The site will first be made ready for construction, after which the builders start to build roads, bridges, showcase houses, i-Streets and country pavilions. The first phase of pavilions were designed by Erick van Egeraat, Paul de Ruiter Architects, René van Zuuk, SeARCH and Studio RAP. The master plan for the Floriade was designed by MVRDV.

A preview centre opened onsite in 2020, allowing visitors to tour the construction site and see the developments for themselves. A Doppelmayr cable car was installed at the park which opened in June 2021 and operated as part of Floriade Preview until the end of September 2021. Management announced that 12,500 visitors purchased tickets for the preview experience in 2021.

=== After the exhibition ===
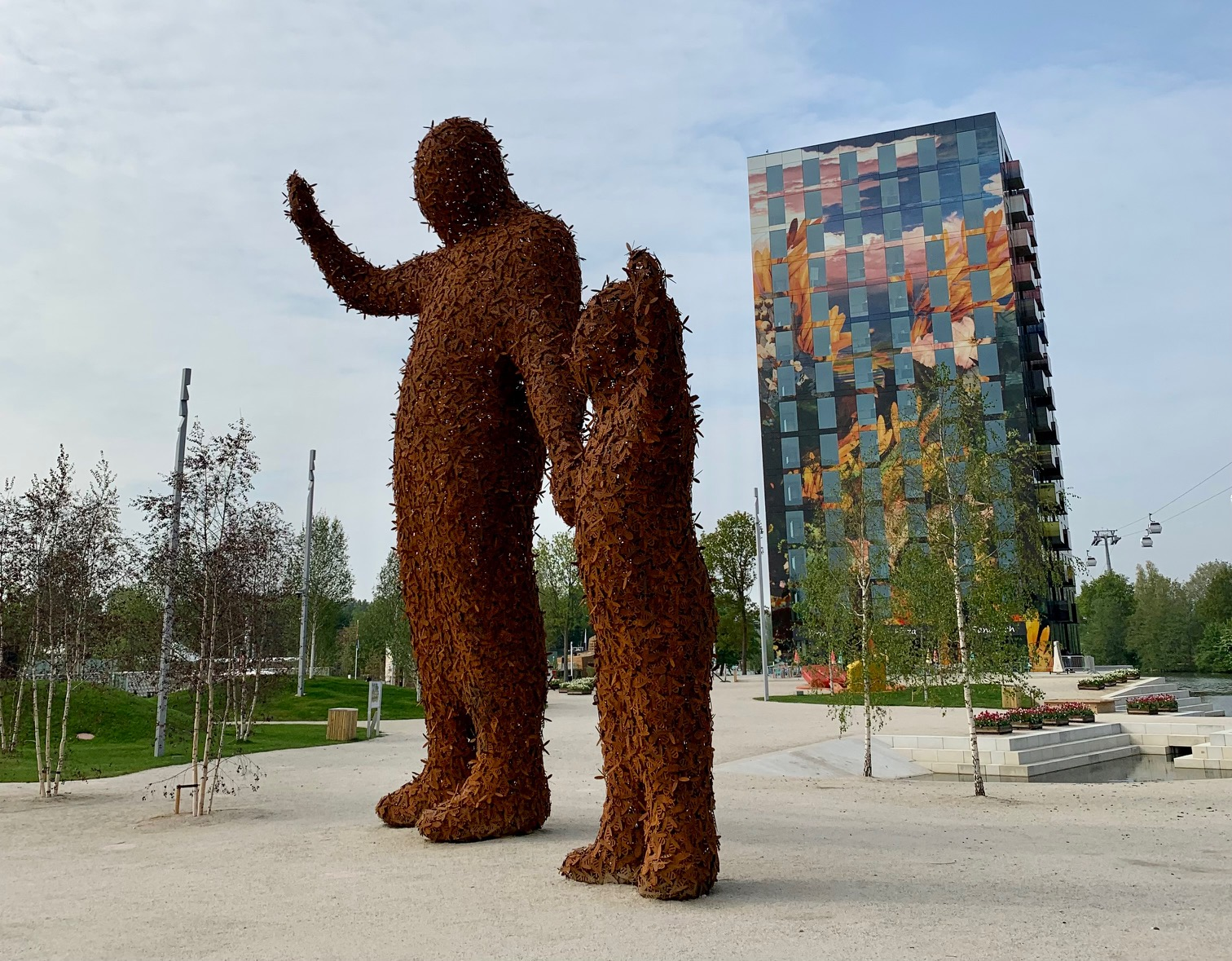
Beehold by Florentijn Hofman in front of the Flores apartment block

After the Expo, the area of the horticultural exhibition will be transformed in a residential area with 660 homes known as "Hortus". Half of the planned housing units were built before the opening of the event, meanwhile, the temporary exhibition spaces will be replaced with new housing units. Some of the exhibition spaces, including the Winy Maas-designed arboretum, will be retained as part of the future community.

== Leadership and management ==
Jannewietske de Vries and Jan Willem Griep were named general manager of Floriade 2022 in 2016 Griep had an accident and suffered from major injuries in 2018 and was not able to retain his position. Jannewietske de Vries departed her position during the same time as she was appointed as mayor of Zuidwest Friesland, As part of a change of vision by the city of Almere, the board of directors also parted effectively leaving the expo without management. Peter Verdaasdonk was named as general manager in 2019, only to depart one year later, when Pieter Cloo was named general manager. Cloo led Floriade through rough waters when the city council of Almere announced it wanted to re-evaluate whether the expo could continue in the aftermath of the COVID-19 pandemic. Cloo left his position in April 2021 as he had lost the trust in the city counsel, although there was also a hefty discussion about his salary, allowing him to only work 4-hours per week for the last four months of his assignment. Sven Stimac was appointed CEO but an employment conflict shortly after his appointment, subsequently Hans Bakker was appointed as CEO. Several senior managers decided to depart the organization.

== Gallery ==
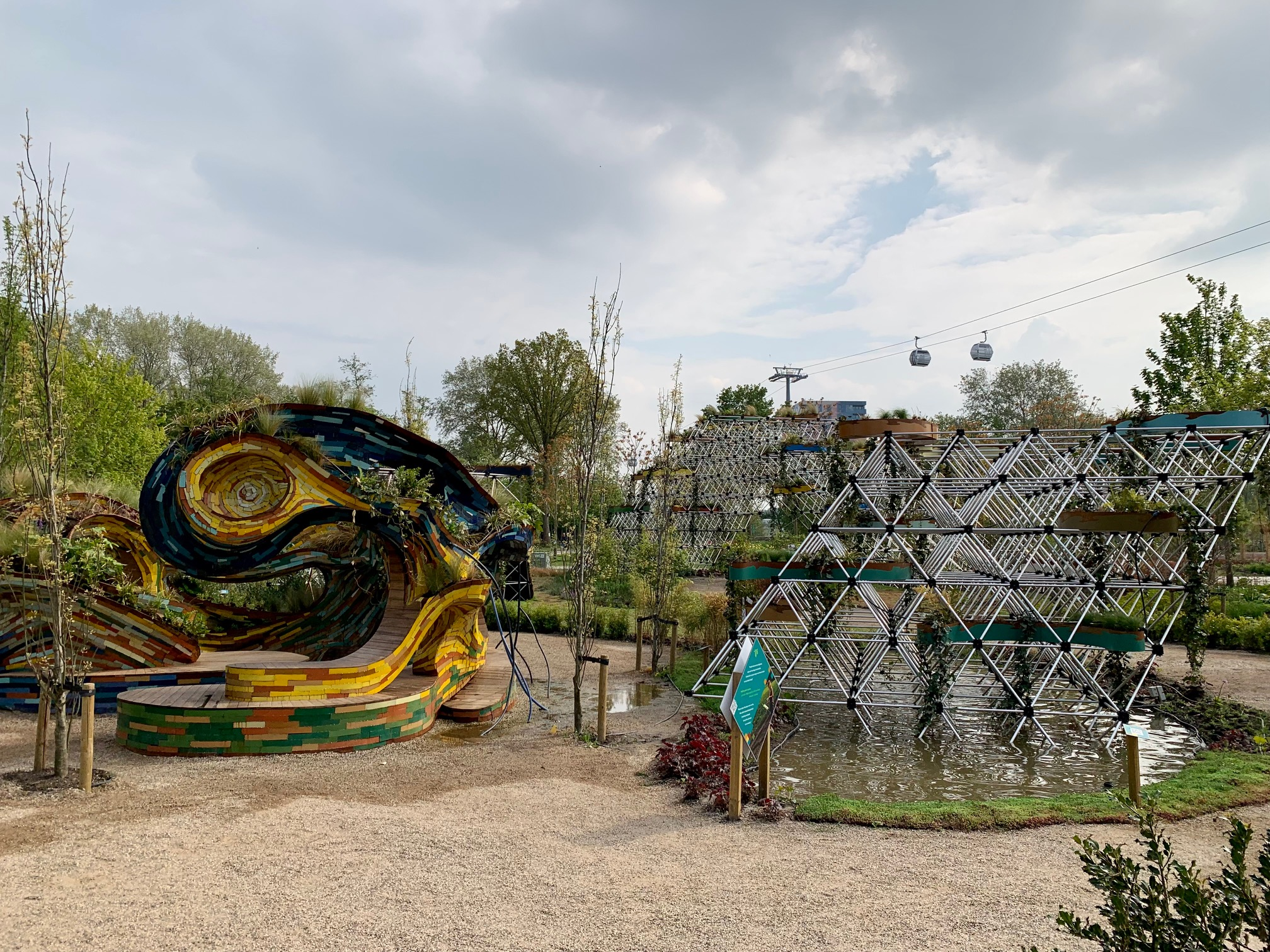
Displays on Green Island

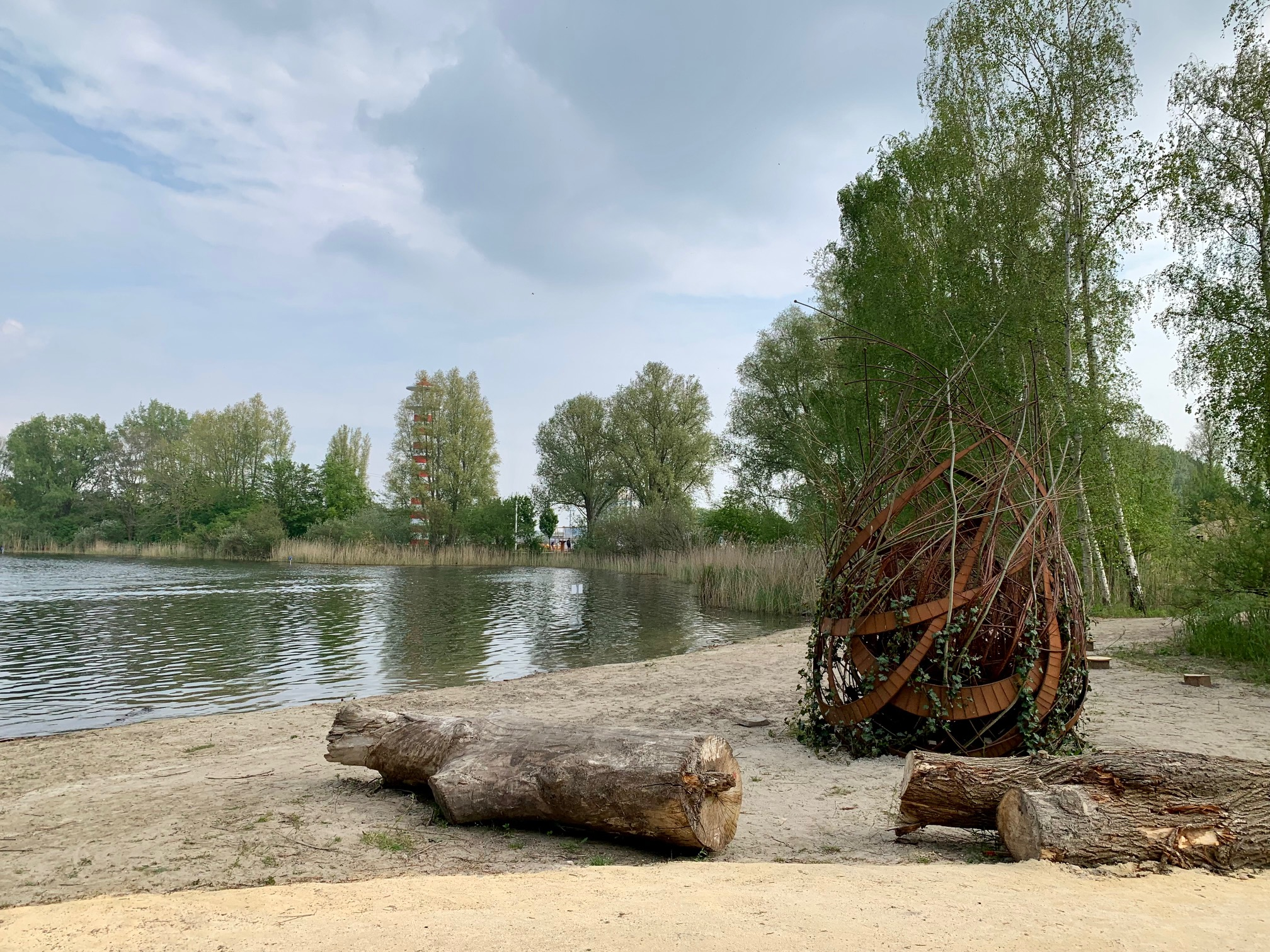
View of Utopia Island

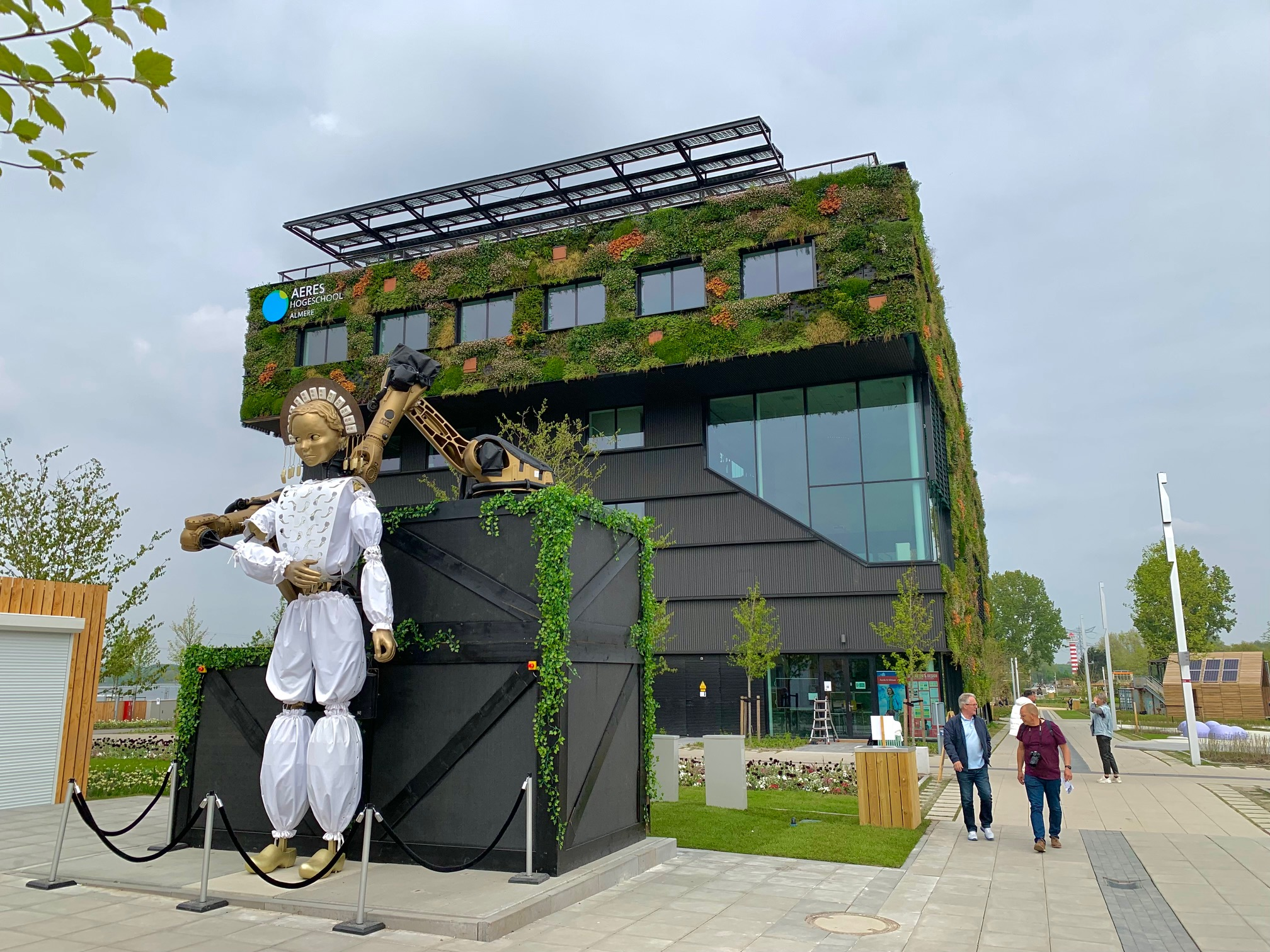
Interactive art display, Okay, I'm Alex

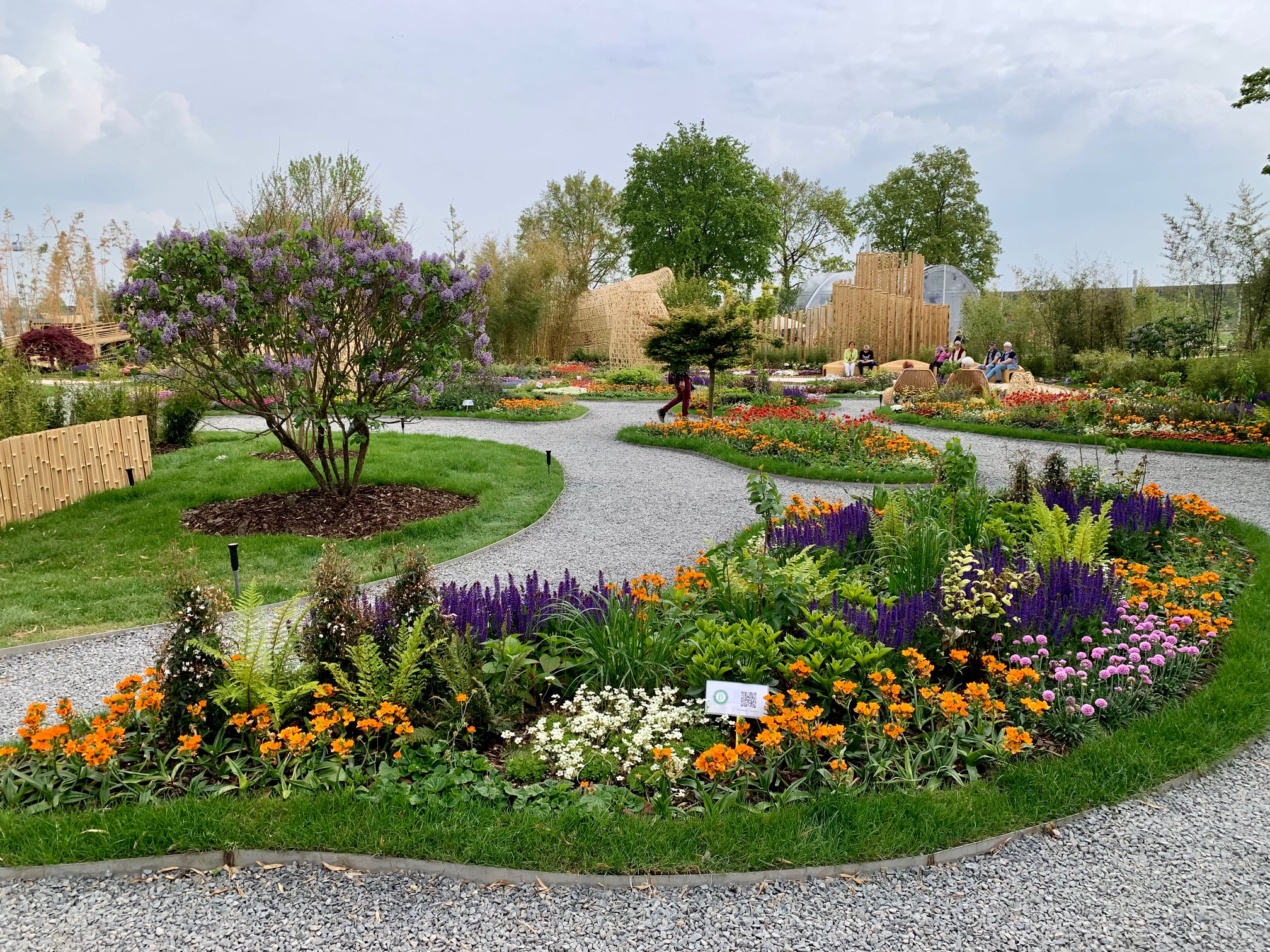
China pavilion

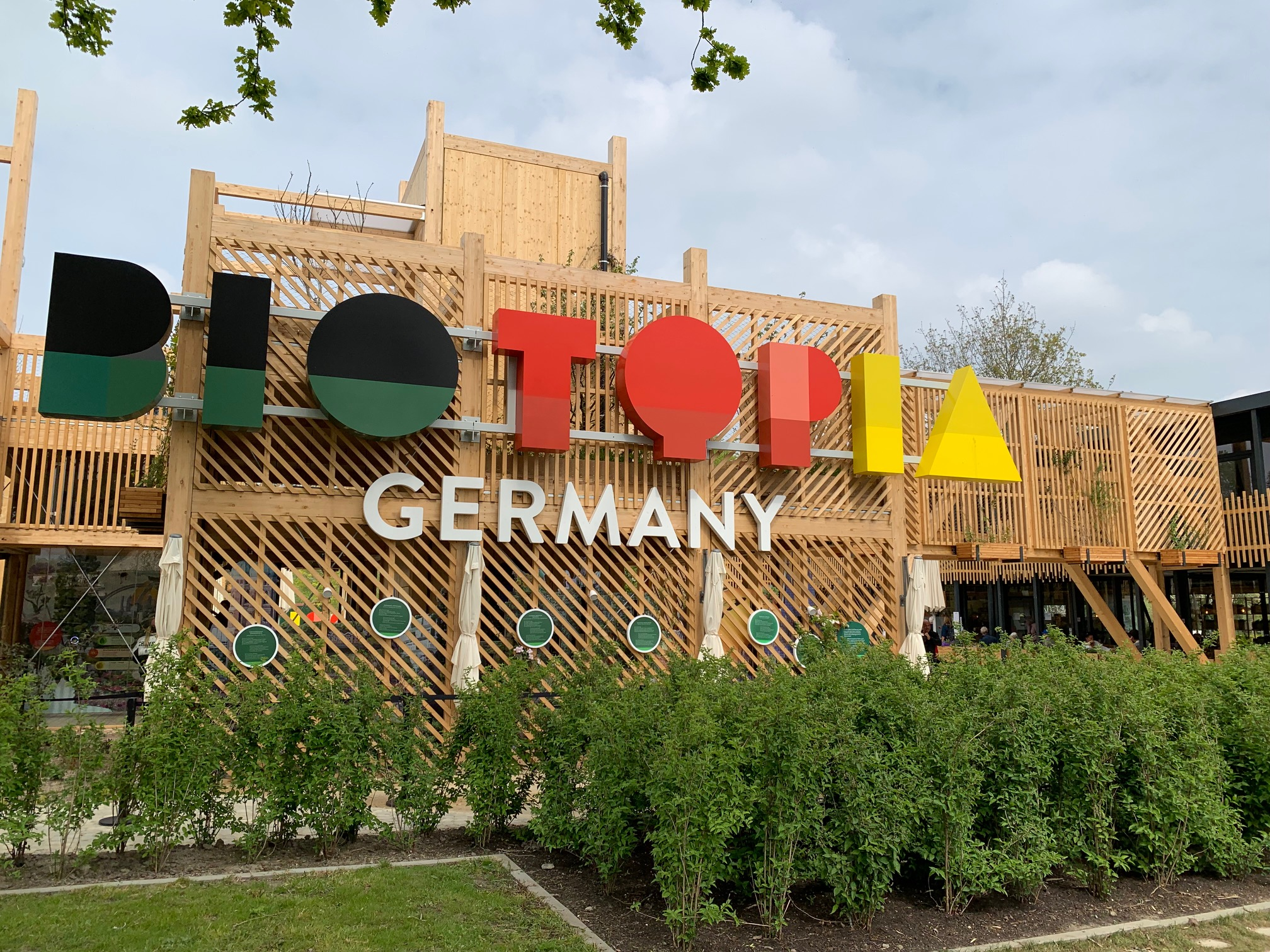
Germany pavilion

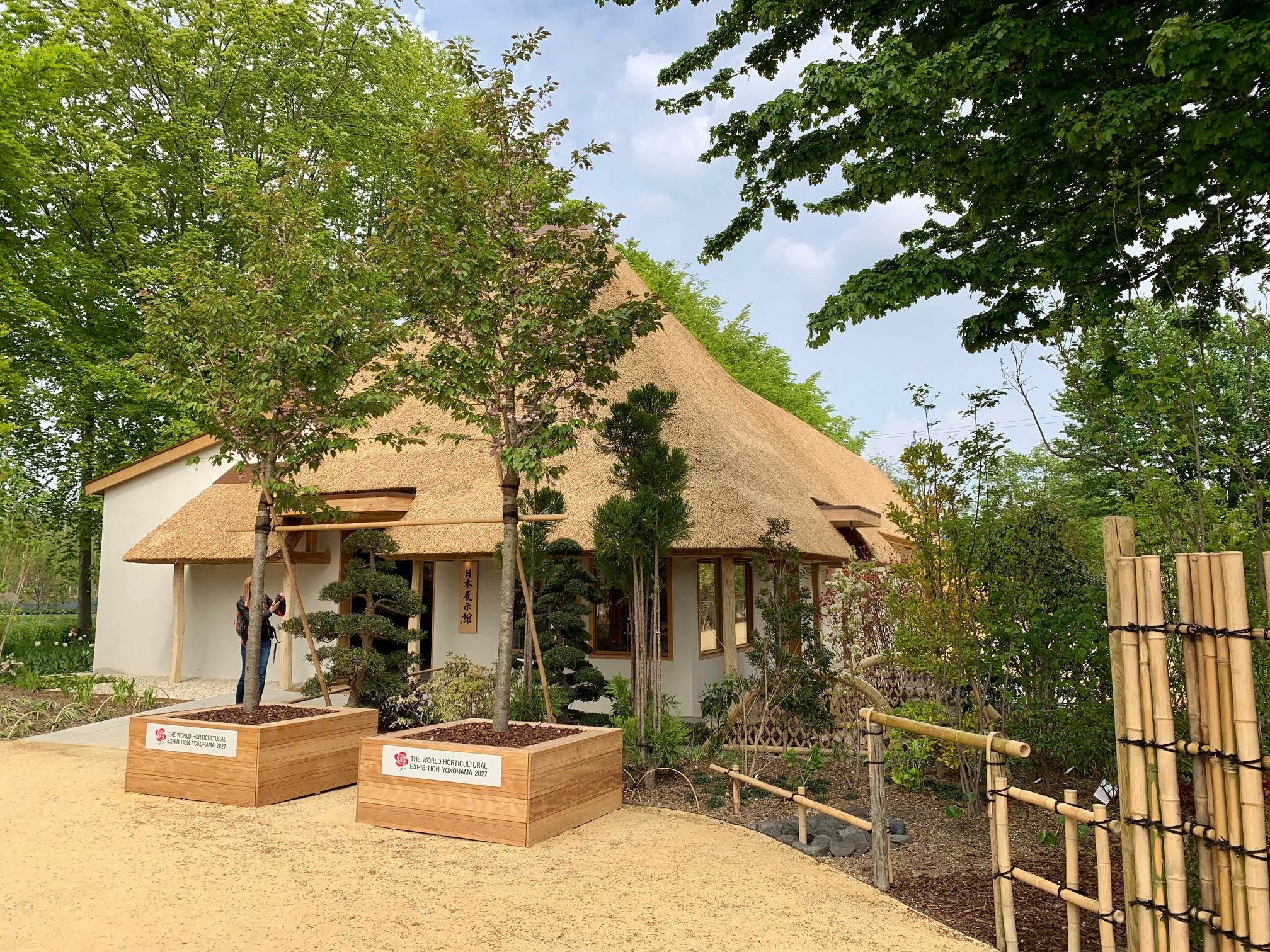
Japan pavilion

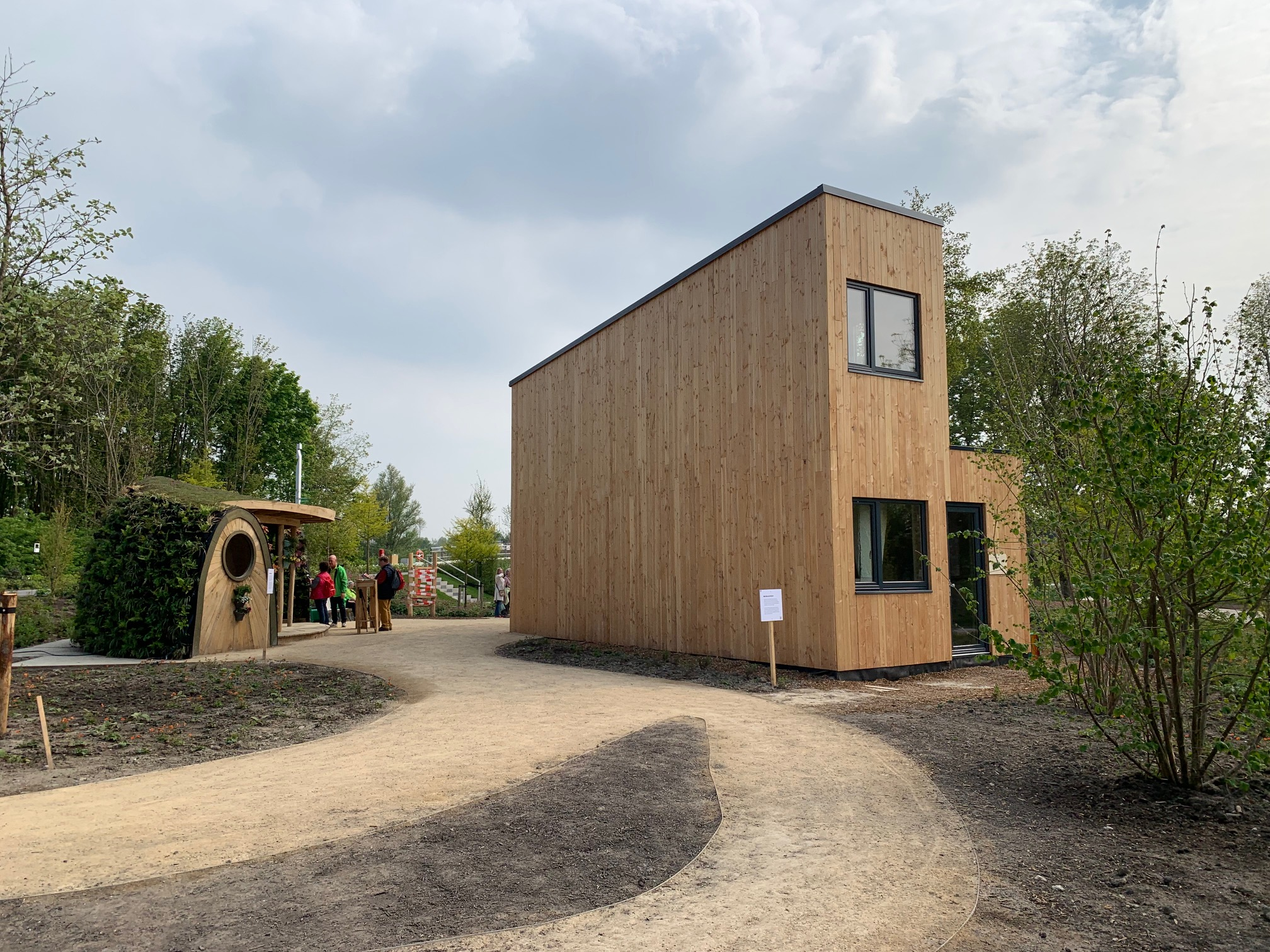
Eco-friendly tiny houses on display

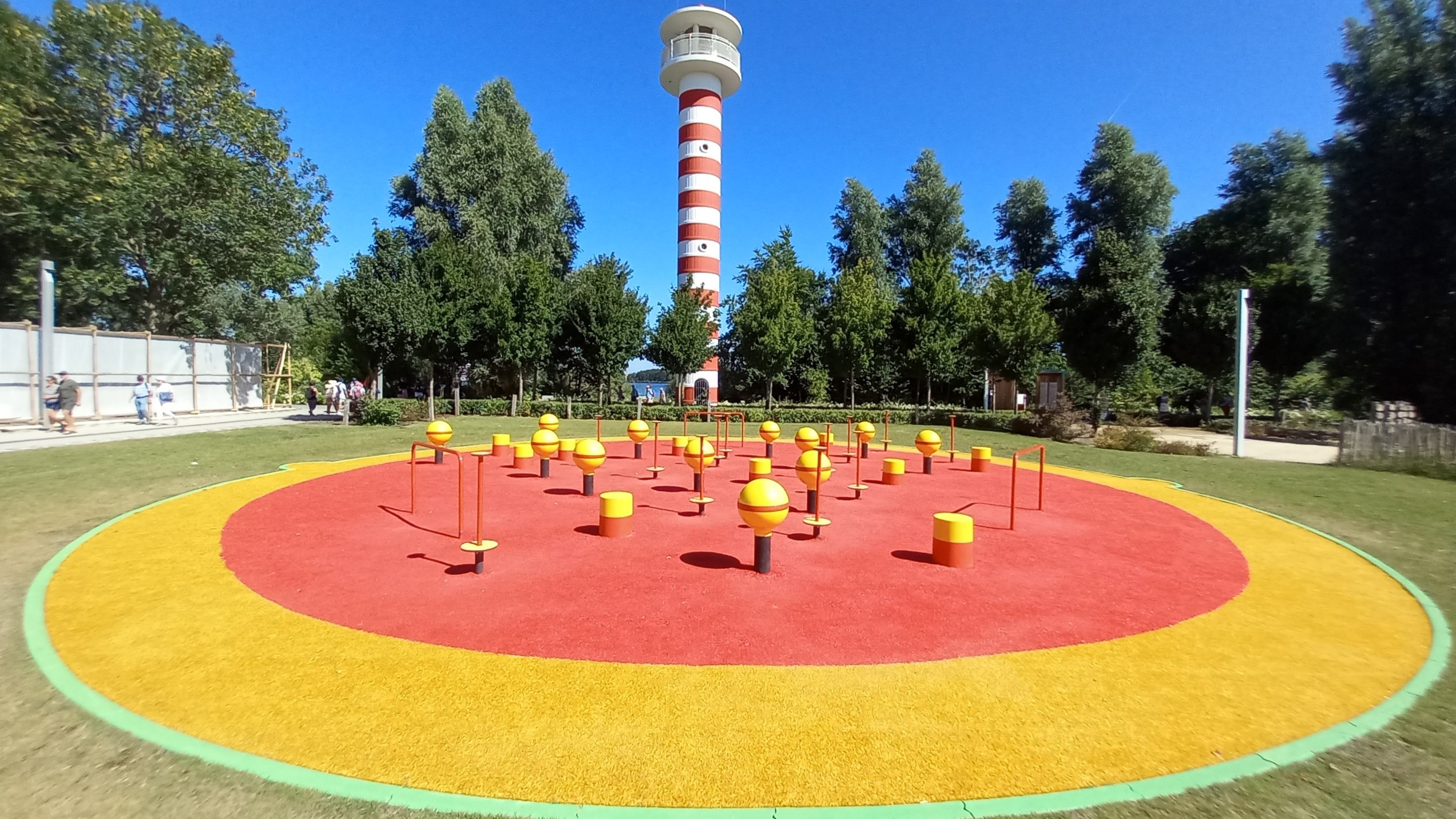
Playground and lighthouse on Utopia Island

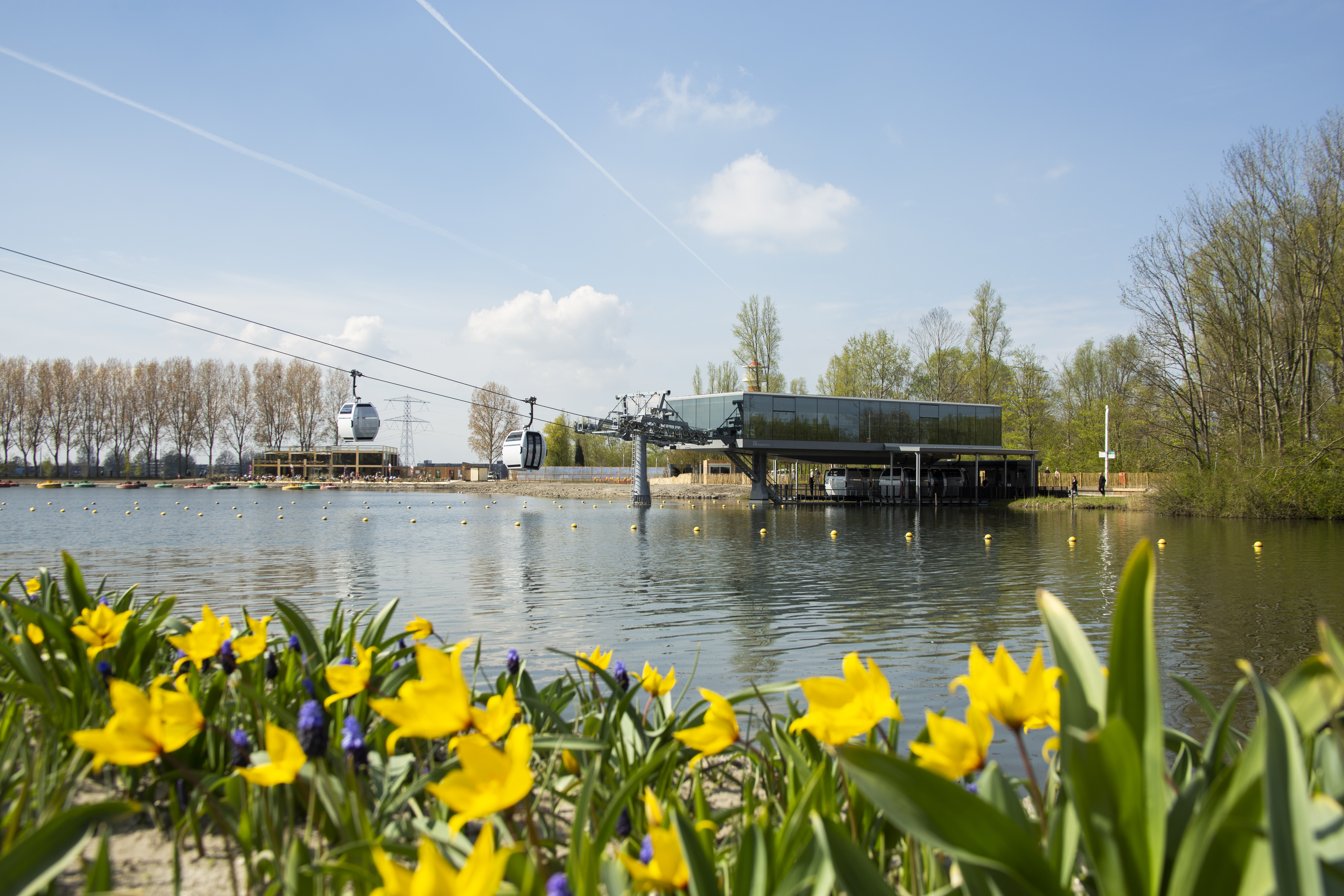
The world's first cable car station located above the water at Floriade 2022
