= Weerwater =

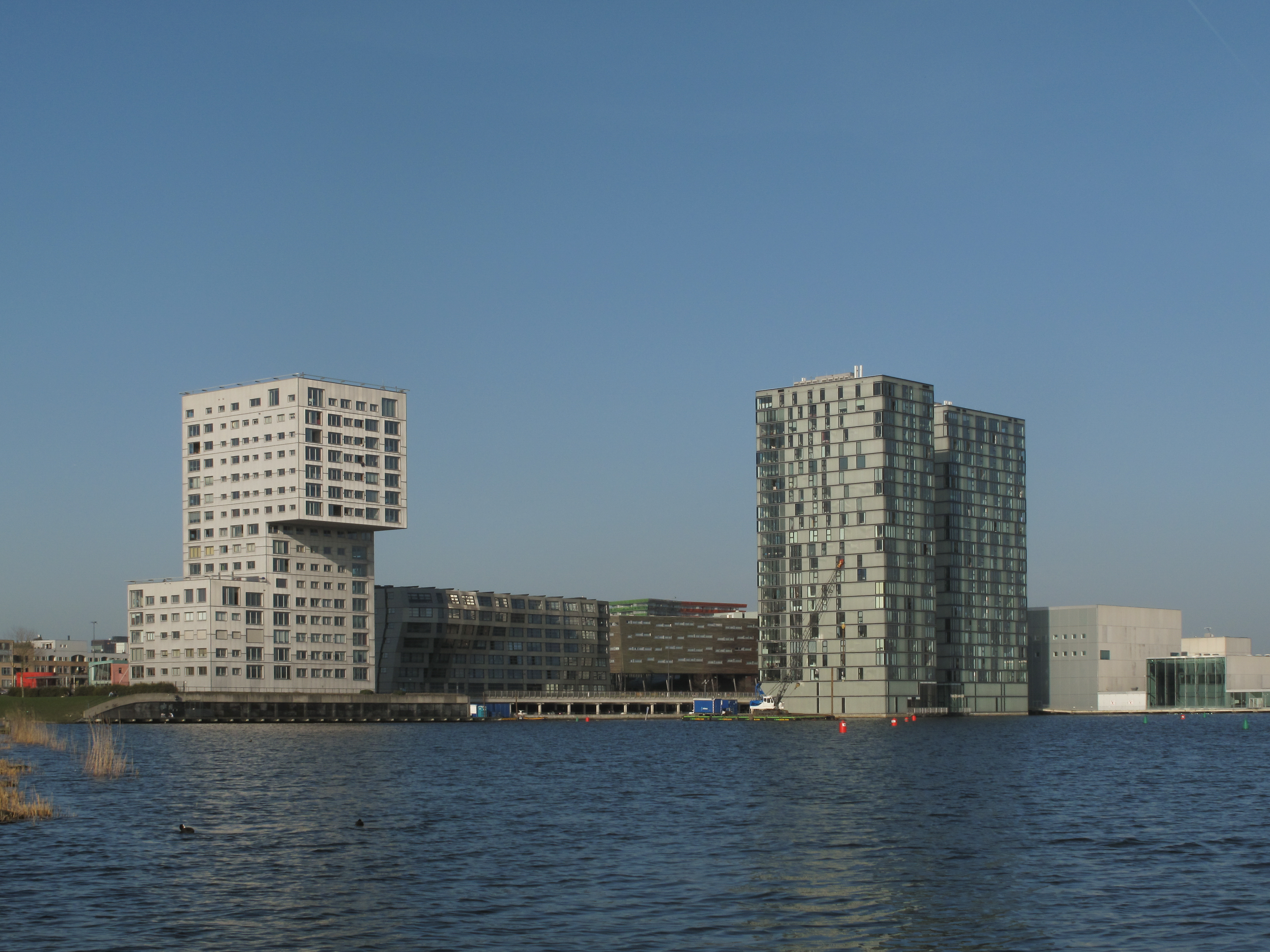
- Weerwater

- Location within Netherlands
- Location: Almere Stad, Almere, Flevoland, Netherlands
- Coordinates: 52.363°N 5.225°E
- Type: lake
- Shore length^{1}: 7 kilometres (4.3 mi)
- ^{1} Shore length is not a well-defined measure.

Weerwater is a small artificial lake in Almere Stad, the central district of Almere in the province Flevoland, Netherlands. The water and shores are used for recreation.

On and around Weerwater a cable ski track, a watersportscenter, watchtower, marina, campsite and four beaches:

- Atlantisstrand (South shore)
- Fantasiestrand (southwestern shore)
- Lumièrestrand (eastern shore)
- Stedenwijkstrand (west shore)

The lake started off as a borrow pit, caused by excavations for Almere Haven and is situated north of Rijksweg 6. Because these excavations caused a new body of water to form, within a polder, this name "Weerwater" ("water again") was adopted.

The actual city center of Almere is situated directly to the north shore and the city theatre Kunstlinie Almere Flevoland 'hovers' over the water.

The perimeter of the Weerwater is approximately 7 kilometres (4.3 mi).

In 2009, the idea surfaced to let three locally well known writers tell the story about the city of Almere, due to the report 'Almere, stad met verbeelding' ('Almere, city with imagination'). The writers were invited to live in Almere with the task to write about their new residence. The second writer Renate Dorrestein named her novel: Weerwater

In the year 2022 horticultural exhibition Floriade 2022 is held on the south side of the het Weerwater, on both sides of Rijksweg A6.

Almere Oosterwold is a planned community with 50% of each property required to be farm, natural, or edible garden.
