= Renate Dorrestein =

Dutch writer (1954–2018)

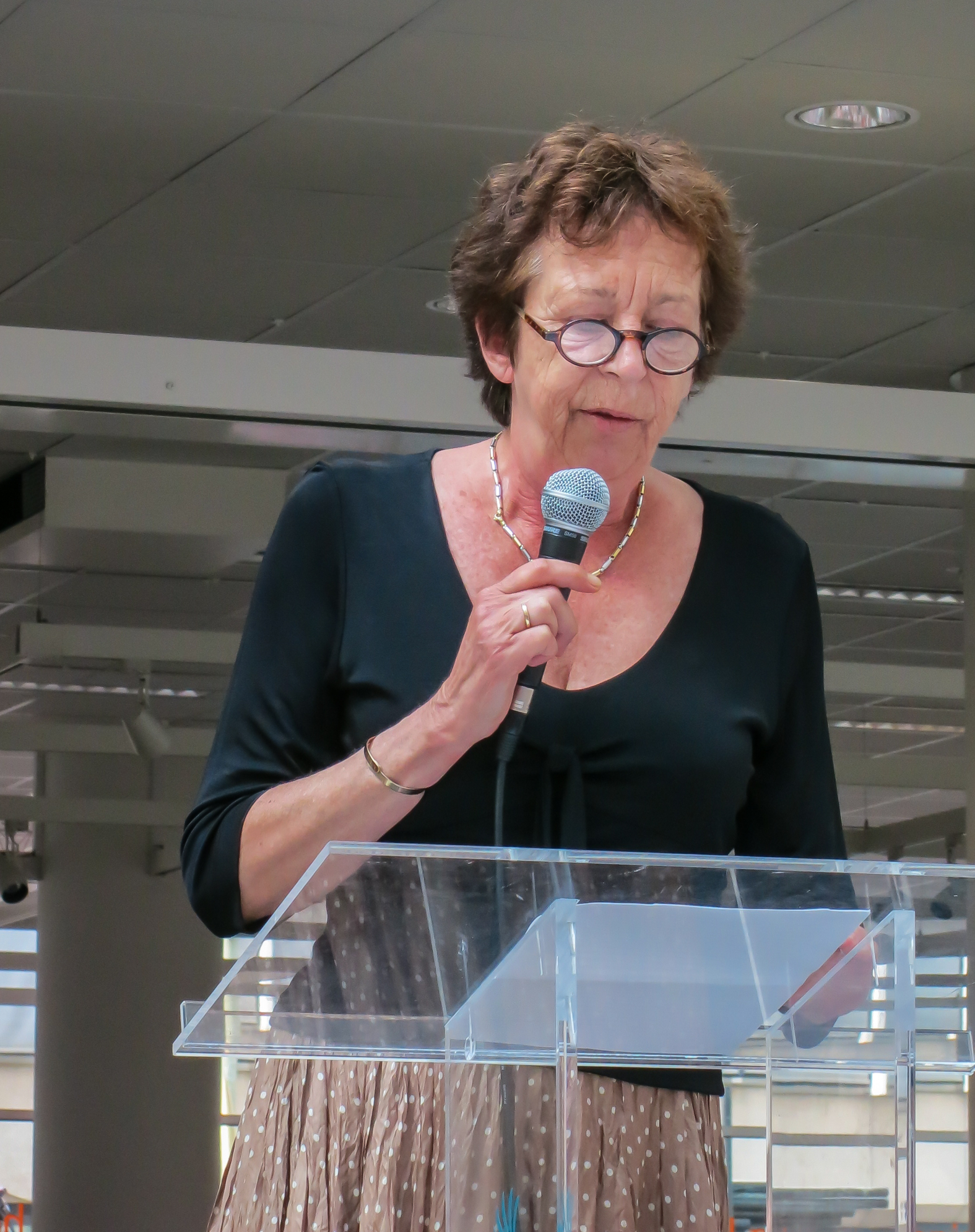
- Renate Dorrestein (in 2015)
- Born: 25 January 1954; Amsterdam
- Died: 4 May 2018 (aged 64); Aerdenhout
- Writing career
- Language: Dutch
- Period: 1983–2017
- Website: renatedorrestein.nl(in Dutch)

Renate Maria Dorrestein (25 January 1954 – 4 May 2018) was a Dutch writer, journalist and feminist. She started working as a junior journalist for the Dutch magazines Libelle and Panorama. During the period 1977 - 1982 she published in Het Parool, Viva, Onkruid and Opzij. Dorrestein published her first novel (Buitenstaanders) in 1983. Her sister's suicide had a great influence on her books. Dorrestein won the Annie Romein prize in 1993 for her complete body of work. A lot of Dorrestein's books were translated, and they were sold in 14 countries.

In September 2017 Dorrestein publicly announced that she was suffering from esophageal cancer. She died on 4 May 2018 at the age of 64.

== Bibliography ==
- 1976 – Voorleesboek voor planten (ISBN 9021603977)
- 1983 – Buitenstaanders
- 1985 – Vreemde streken
- 1986 – Noorderzon
- 1987 – Een nacht om te vliegeren
- 1988 – Korte metten
- 1988 – Het perpetuum mobile van de liefde
- 1988 – Haar kop eraf. Alice als ideale heldin voor hedendaagse feministes (essay, ISBN 9051880227)
- 1989 – Vóór alles een dame
- 1991 – Het hemelse gerecht
- 1992 – Katten en de kunst van het boekenonderhoud / Cats and the art of book maintenance
- 1992 – Ontaarde moeders (translated into English as Unnatural mothers for the US)
- 1993 – Heden ik
- 1994 – Een sterke man
- 1996 – Verborgen gebreken (translated into English as Crying shame for the UK and made into a film in 2004 (Verborgen Gebreken (film), by Paula van der Oest)
- 1997 – Het Tiende Inzicht (ISBN 907601101X)
- 1997 – Want dit is mijn lichaam ("Boekenweekgeschenk")
- 1998 – Een hart van steen (translated into English as A heart of stone for the US and the UK)
- 1999 – Voor Liefde klik op F (short story)
- 2000 – Het geheim van de schrijver
- 2001 – Zonder genade (translated into English as Without mercy for the US and the UK)
- 2003 – Het duister dat ons scheidt (translated into English as The Darkness That Divides Us by Hester Velmens)
- 2004 – Zolang er leven is
- 2006 – Mijn zoon heeft een seksleven en ik lees mijn moeder Roodkapje voor
- 2007 – Echt sexy
- 2008 – Laat me niet alleen
- 2009 – Is er hoop
- 2009 – Heiligenlevens en bananenpitten
- 2010 – De leesclub
- 2011 – Pas goed op jezelf (novella, also available as audiobook, written while writer in residence with the Vrije Universiteit Amsterdam)
- 2011 – De stiefmoeder
- 2012 – De zondagmiddagauto
- 2013 – De blokkade
- 2013 – Nott Won't Sleep (iPad game for toddlers about sleeping)
- 2014 – Liever horen we onszelf (audiobook)
- 2015 – Weerwater
- 2015 – Penvriendin in China: Hoe ik dacht een dissident te helpen
- 2016 – Zeven soorten honger
- 2017 – Reddende engel (ISBN 9789057598609)
- 2017 – Liever horen we onszelf (reissue of the audiobook from 2014, ISBN 9789021408170)
- 2018 – Dagelijks werk - een schrijversleven ("literary autobiography" with various texts written by Dorrestein in the course of her life, some of them published before, with a newly added introduction for each. ISBN 9789057599132)
