= History of the Shanghai World Expo =

The 2010 Shanghai World Expo was the culmination of more than a century of Chinese involvement with world fairs.

== Background ==
Chinese involvement in world fairs goes back to the very first one, the 1851 Great Exhibition in Victorian London. Hearing about the exhibition, Xu Rongcun (徐榮村), a Cantonese businessman in Shanghai, hurriedly prepared 12 bags of silk to present at the event. Queen Victoria herself even gave Xu a golden award. Another participant was Xisheng (希生), who arrived on the Chinese ship Keying and purported to represent the Qing government. Despite wearing an official uniform and standing for a portrait by Henry Courtney Selous, he was actually simply a private individual from Guangdong.

The Qing dynasty first officially participated in the 1876 Philadelphia Centennial Exposition, then continued in 1904 in the St Louis Louisiana Purchase Exposition. The Republic of China participated in the 1915 Panama–Pacific International Exposition.

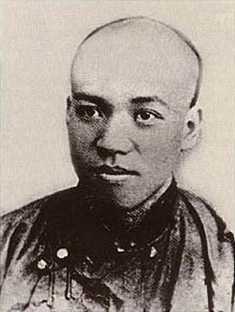
Liang Qichao, one of the many scholars to write about the possibility of hosting an expo

In 1893 a Qing representative from Xiangshan County, Guangdong named Zheng Guanying wrote a book called Words of Warning to a Prosperous Age. In the book, Zheng argued that China needed to establish a constitution and a parliament and become a constitutional monarchy. The book also proposed the idea of China hosting a "world's fair". Cheng recommended Shanghai as the place to hold the fair because it was a meeting point of East and West. The book was read and appreciated by the Guangxu Emperor, who recommended printing 2000 copies of it.

In 1902 scholar Liang Qichao also mentioned the idea of an expo in a book called The Future of New China. He even went to the Louisiana Purchase Exposition in the United States in 1904.

In the ancient town of Zhujiajiao in Shanghai, a scholar by the name of Lu Shi'e wrote a novel in 1910 called Xin Zhongguo (New China). The novel describes a utopian vision of Shanghai in 1950, hosting a grand exposition for nations from around the world.

In the Republic of China era, Sun Yat-sen wrote a series of three works collectively known as the Plan for National Reconstruction. In one of the books, he pointed out that Shanghai was in the position to host a world's fair. In the 1930s and 1940s, China was engulfed by the Chinese Civil War and the Second Sino-Japanese War, and all plans to host an exposition were postponed. It wasn't until after 1979 when Deng Xiaoping revisited the world expo idea again.

A number of specialized world fairs of much smaller scale have appeared in China before. The first was the Qing-era Nanyang Industrial Exposition, the 1910 Nanking or Nanjing Exposition. The Republic of China government tried numerous times to host a fair since 1920. They did not succeed until the 1929 West Lake Exposition.

Since then the successful hosting of the 1999 World Horticultural Exposition in Kunming was a key event that brought modern hosting experience into China and eventually led to the Shanghai bid. On November 18, 1999, the Chinese government officially decided that Shanghai would bid for the 2010 World Expo. The city would win the bid on December 3, 2002 at the 132nd General Assembly of the International Exhibitions Bureau. The 2010 Shanghai Expo took place exactly 100 years after 1910, when Lu Shi'e envisioned hosting an expo in the city.

== World expo ==
The first World Expo in China took place between 1 May and 31 October 2010, under the theme of “Better City, Better Life”, in Shanghai. Consisting of 523 hectares, it was the largest site in the history of World Expos, and took place in the area between the Nanpu and Lupu bridges on both sides of the Huangpu River.

- List of world's fairs
- List of world expositions
