= Tibet Development Company =

Tibet Development Company Limited (Chinese: 西藏发展股份有限公司, SZSE: 000752), also referred to as Tibet Development (Chinese: 西藏发展), Tibet Galaxy Technology Development Company Limited (Chinese: 西藏银河科技发展股份有限公司), specializes in the selling of Lhasa Beer and various other beverages.

== History ==
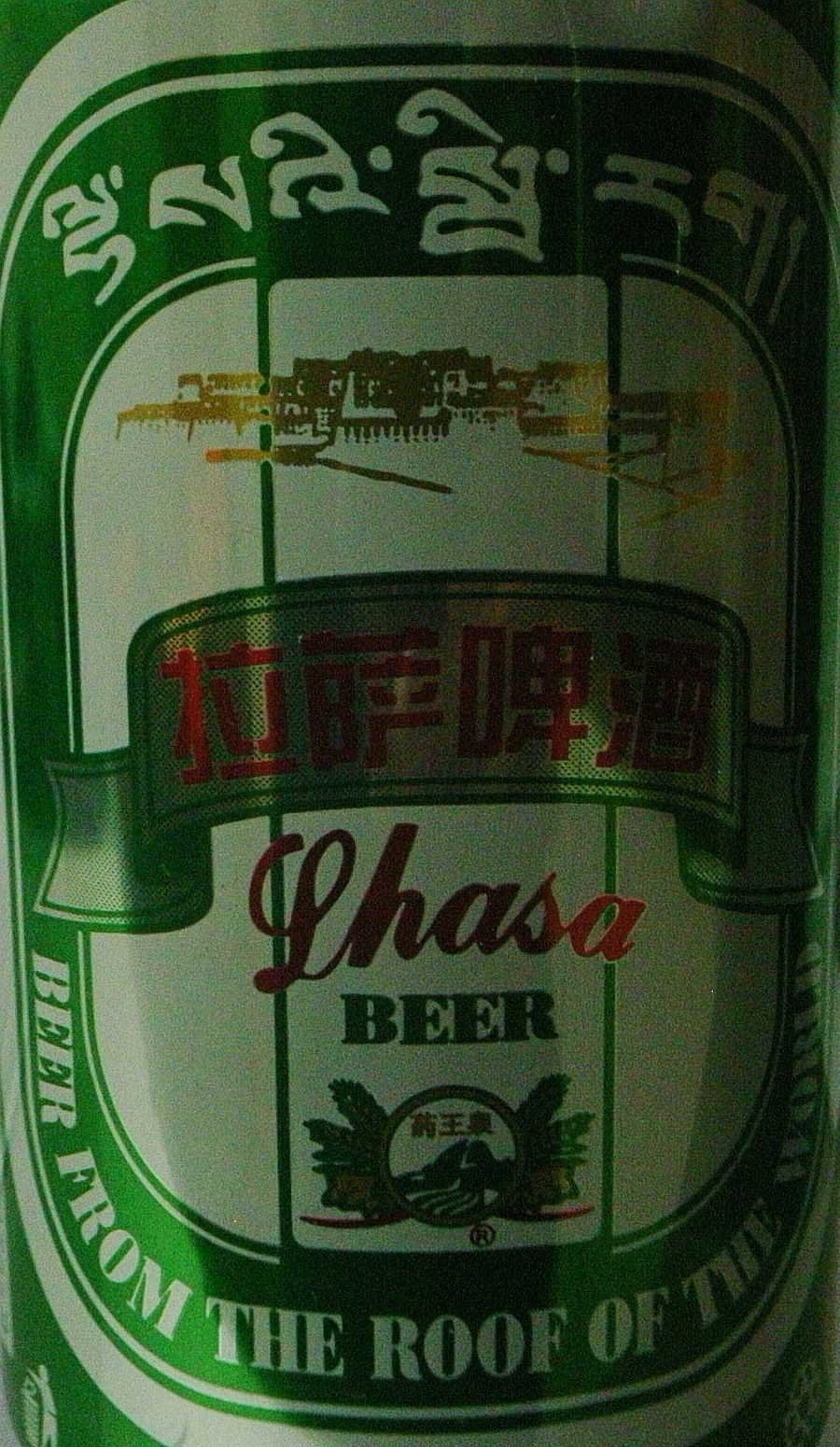
Lhasa Beer, the only Tibetan beer on the world market

Tibet Development Co., Ltd. received approval from the People's Government of Tibet Autonomous Region in Document No. 53 of Tibet Administrative Letter (1996) on December 16, 1996. It was established as a joint stock company, with Tibet Lhasa Brewery Limited Liability Company as the primary entity, and four companies—Tibet Pearl Company Limited, Tibet Autonomous Region Mining Industry Development Corporation, Sichuan Yingda Information Company, and Shengdia (Food) Company Limited—as the founders, raising capital from the general public. The company was listed on the Shenzhen Stock Exchange in June 1997.

On August 30, 2001, the Company rebranded from Tibet Lhasa Brewery Company Limited to Tibet Galaxy Science and Technology Development Company Limited. In November 2004, the "Lhasa Brewery" and its logo were acknowledged by the State Administration for Industry and Commerce (SAIC) as a "China Well-known Trademark."

In 2019, it was recognized by Tibet Autonomous Region as one of the "Top 100 Private Enterprises in Tibet," a distinction it has received annually thereafter.

== See also ==
- Beer in Tibet
