= Zhang Xiaoquan (disambiguation) =

Zhang Xiaoquan (Chinese: 张小泉) is a 1628 Chinese scissor making company.

Zhang Xiaoquan may refer to:

- Joseph Chang, whose Chinese name may be romanised as Zhang Xiaoqun (Chinese: 张孝全)
- Michael Zhang, whose Chinese name may be romanised as Zhang Xiaoqun (Chinese: 张晓泉)
