= Zhang Xiaoquan =

Scissors shop in Hangzhou, China

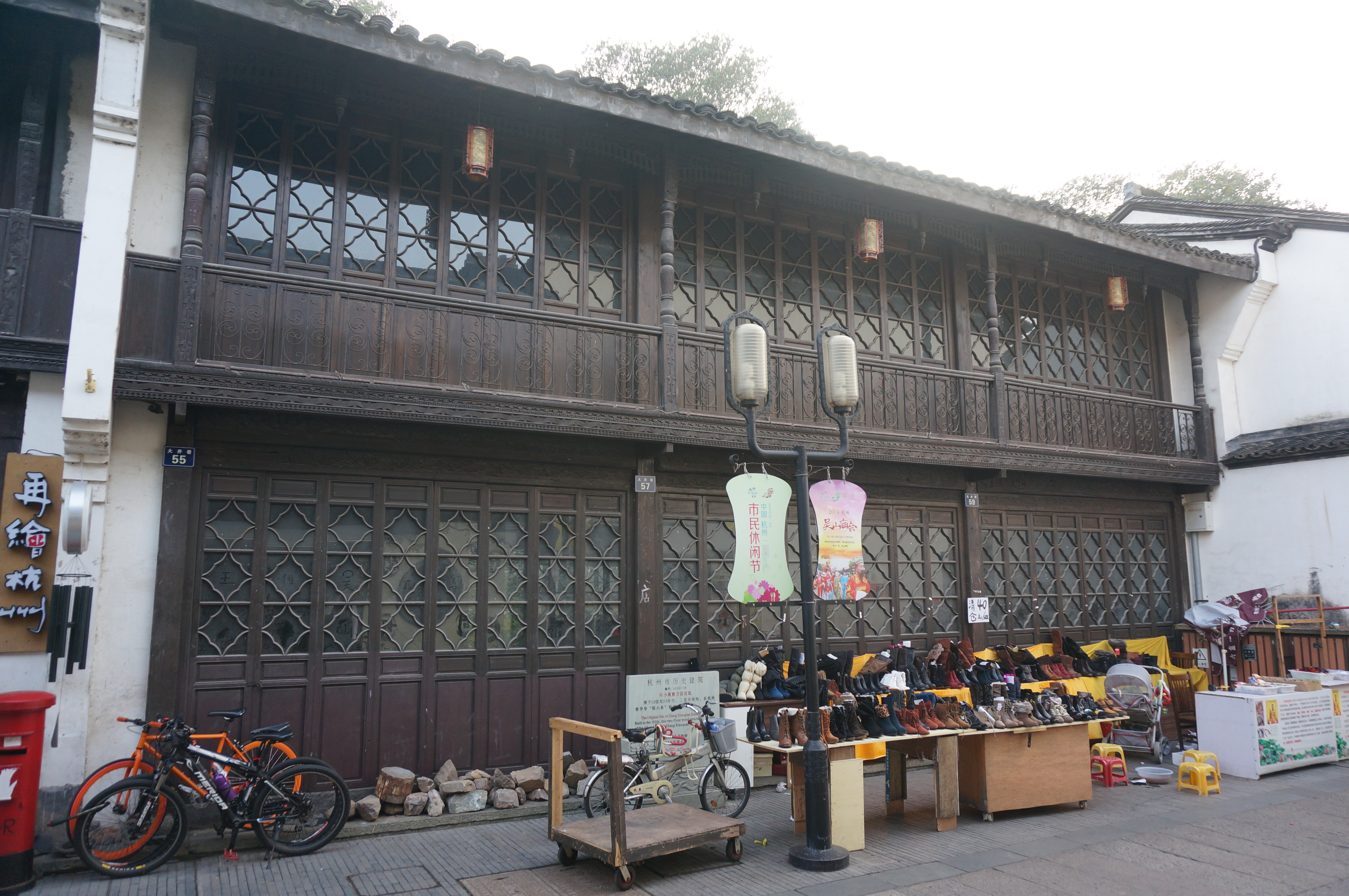
- Site of original store, taken in 2014
- Native name: 张小泉
- Headquarters: China
- Products: scissors; knives

Zhang Xiaoquan (Chinese: 张小泉; pinyin: Zhāng Xiǎoquán) is a shop in Hangzhou, China, that makes and sells scissors. It is named after its founder and was formed near the 1st year of Chongzhen, or AD 1628.

== History ==
Zhang Sijia (张思家) returned to his hometown, Huichang, Yi County, Anhui after mastering the techniques of making scissors at Wuhu, Anhui, and then opened Zhang Dalong Scissors Shop (张大隆剪刀店; Zhāng dàlóng jiǎndāo diàn). His son, Zhang Xiaoqun (张小泉; Zhāng Xiǎoquán) would take up apprenticeship under him, and assisted his father in tending the shop.

Due to chaos resulted from the war, the shop shuttered, and Zhang Xiaoqun and his son, Zhang Jin'gao (张近高; Zhāng Jìn'gāo), had to flee and settled in what was the most prosperous region of Hangzhou then, at the foot of Chenghuang Mountain (now known as Wushan, Hangzhou). To earn a living, in 1580 the Zhang family decided to settle up shop, making and selling scissors, with the shop taking on the name Zhang Dalong Scissors Shop (张大隆剪刀铺; Zhāng dàlóng jiǎndāo pù). As the scissors manufactured by Zhang Dalong Scissors Shop was sharp and long lasting, it slowly gained its reputation.

However, the brand 'Zhang Xiaoqun' would only be established some 50 years later in 1628, when it decided to use its founder's name 'Zhang Dalong' as the trademark. It was only in 1663 that the company changed its name to Zhang Xiaoqun Jinji (张小泉近记; Zhāng Xiǎoquán Jìnjì).

During the reign of Qianlong Emperor (1735–1796), Zhang Xiaoquan was managed by the third generation owner, Zhang Shuting (张树庭), and its scissors were presented to the royal family and used in the palaces. By the reign of Tongzhi Emperor (1861–1875), it was one of the five most well-known brands of Hangzhou.

In 1915, at the Panama–Pacific International Exposition, the company was awarded with a silver medal. In 1929, at the Westlake exposition, it was presented with the highest award.

Business was disrupted due to the Second Sino-Japanese War, and continued to flounder with production almost to a halt, and the company resorting to rent out their shopfront for 190 teals of gold. To restore the production line, the local government decided to establish 5 cooperatives under the company's name in 1953. In 1954, the 5 cooperatives was relocated to Hangzhou Haiyue Bridge, and was consolidated into Hangzhou Zhang Xiaoqun Scissors Cooperative (杭州张小泉剪刀厂) in 1955. In 1956, under the directions of Mao Zedong, the Hangzhou Zhang Xiaoquan Scissors Factory, located at No. 33 Daguan Road, Hangzhou, was built with an allocation of 400,000 yuan from the national government and 200,000 yuan raised by the local government.

In 1991, Zhang Xiaoquan was identified as a China Time-honored Brand by the predecessor of Ministry of Commerce, the Ministry of State Economic, in its initial batch of companies. In 1997, the company was given the China Well-known Trademark. In 2000, the company was reincorporated as Hangzhou Zhang Xiaoman Group, Co. Ltd. In 2002, the company was issued with an certificate of origin. In 2006, after the Ministry of Commerce released a new "China Time-honored Brand" guidelines, the company was reaffirmed as so. On May 20, 2006, the company's scissors manufacturing techniques was part of the first batch of intangible assets to be registered in the China National Intangible Cultural Heritage list.

There are 72 processes in the traditional hand-forging process. The scissors are characterized by "sharp cutting face, smooth pivoting, and ease of handling".

== See also ==
- List of oldest companies
