= Shanghai Expo Park =

Park in Shanghai, China

Coordinates: 31.187638°N 121.485121°E

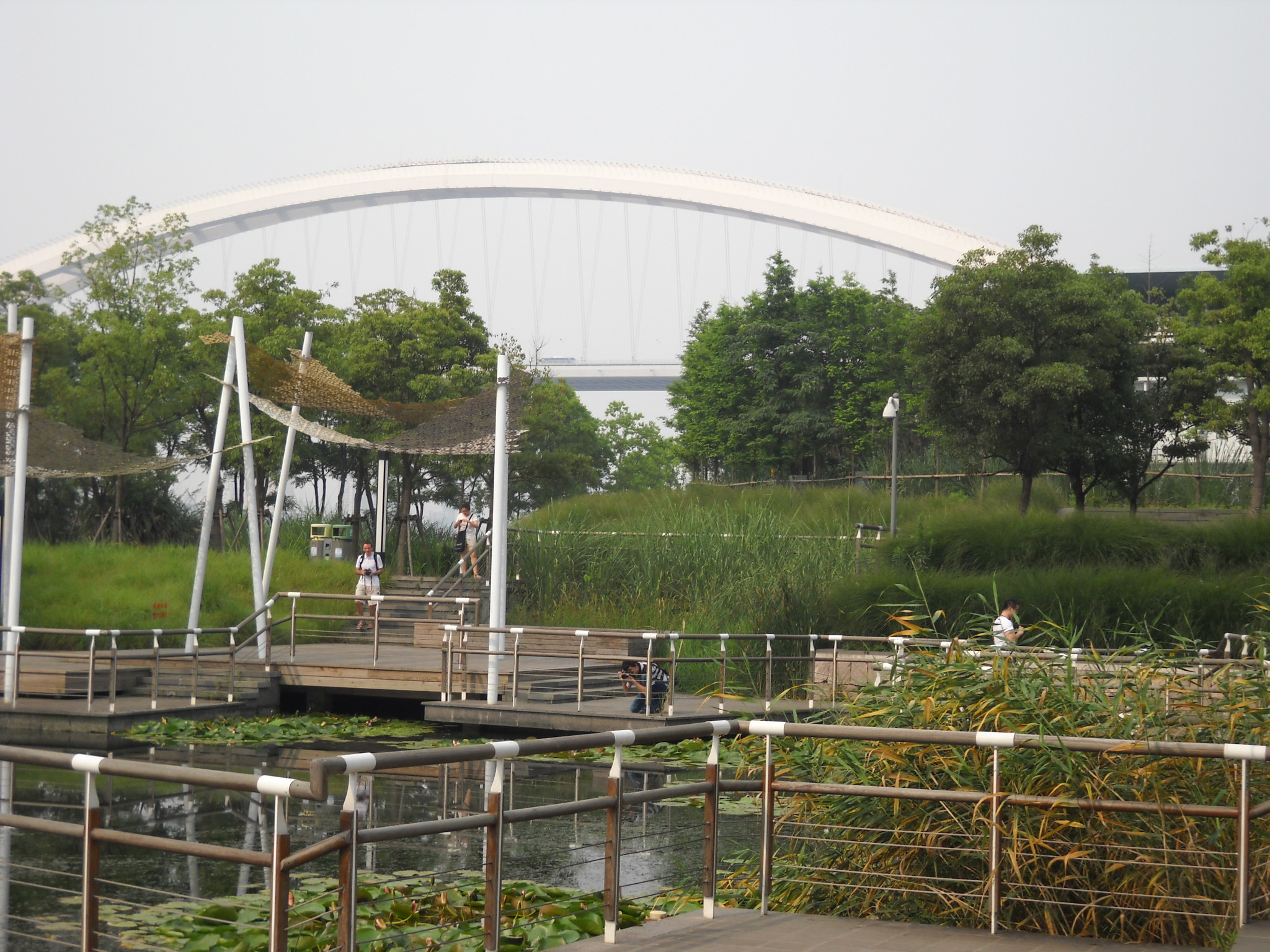
- Interactive map of Shanghai Expo Park
- Location: Pudong, Shanghai, China

Shanghai Expo Park (simplified Chinese: 上海世博公园; traditional Chinese: 世博公園; pinyin: Shìbo Gōngyuán; Shanghainese: Sypoh Gonyu) is a park in the district of Pudong within Shanghai. It is situated in Pudong New Area. It is located near the Mercedes-Benz Arena.

== Events ==
It hosted the Shanghai Expo 2010 and Strawberry Music Festival 2012. The park is close to Huangpu River, next to Mercedes-Benz Arena and the Expo Axis in Shanghai's Pudong New Area.

== Features ==
The park includes the Expo Stage, and visitors can walk and travel along the Huang Pu riverside. The park's landscaping combines Western and Chinese gardening styles. Well known places in Expo Park include the cranes, the wetland and the lotus pond.

== Transportation ==
Expo Park is best reached by taking Line 8, Shanghai Metro on the Shanghai Metro to Yaohua Road Station.
