= Salut Salon =

Chamber music quartet from Hamburg, Germany

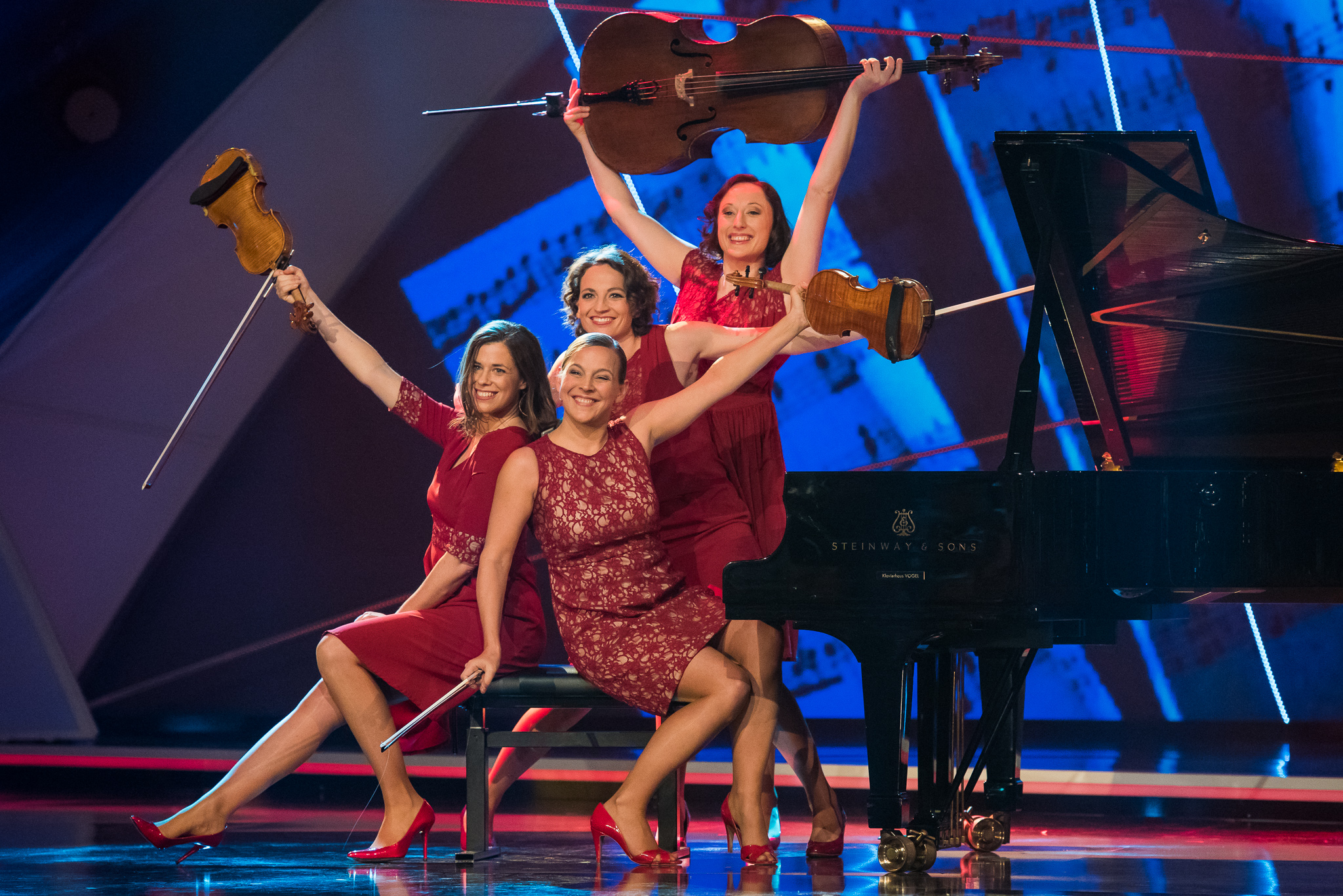
- Salut Salon at the 2014 Bayerischer Rundfunk Sternstunden Gala

Background information
- Origin: Hamburg, Germany
- Genres: Chamber ensemble; Contemporary classical
- Website: www.salut-salon.com/en/home

Salut Salon is a chamber music quartet from Hamburg, Germany, with two violinists, a cellist, and a pianist, all women. It was founded in 2002 by violinists Angelika Bachmann and Iris Siegfried. They have been called "the Harlem Globetrotters of piano quartets."

Logo

Their repertoire includes arranged classical music, themes from folk music and film soundtracks, as well as original chansons, tango, pop music, puppet shows and instrumental acrobatics, "a crossover that defies the strict classification of classical and popular music."

A number of their performances have appeared on YouTube, gathering considerable publicity.

== History ==
The two founders of the quartet met when they shared a desk in a school music rehearsal in the 1980s. Since then, they have performed together ceaselessly, notably after they graduated high school, with the pianist Ameli Winkler. They would play salon music together in the style that was popular in the 19th and 20th centuries. Their first performance as a quartet was in autumn of 1999, with Bachmann and Siegfried on the violins, Winkler on the piano, and Simone Bachmann on the cello. On 3 January 2003 they played their first major public concert in the Hamburg Musikhalle. That same year, their first CD was produced for the Warner label, What Can the Heart Return. Shortly after its release, Warner offered them a record deal. Since then, the quartet plays more than 100 concerts a year, with a changing formation, although Bachmann and Siegfried remain throughout until November 2022. Since 2008, they've performed consistently with the pianist Anne von Twardowski and the cellist Sonja Lena Schmid.

In 2003 Salon performed their first international concert. Since then they have had many appearances abroad, in the United States, Canada, Chile, Russia, Switzerland, Italy, Luxembourg, Spain, and China, where they represented Hamburg as musical ambassadors in the 2010 World Expo in Shanghai. They have also appeared on television and radio numerous times.

Salut Salon celebrated their tenth anniversary in 2012 with a tour which included Pune in India. 2016 saw their debut in New York City in a concert of their program "Carnival of the Animals and Other Phantasies" at the Michael Schimmel Center.

== Biographies ==
=== Angelika Bachmann ===
Angelika Bachmann, born in 1972 in Hamburg, was exempted from the regular school curriculum and was thus able to devote her time entirely to playing the violin. This enabled her to make her solo debut with the Hamburger Symphoniker at the age of seven. She studied with Roland Greutter, concertmaster of the Hamburg Radio Symphony Orchestra, among others, which helped her win first prize multiple times in Germany's prestigious Jugend musiziert competition. In 2007 she published Flexible Strings: Five Pieces for Variable String Ensemble, a collection of her arrangements, with Breitkopf & Härtel. In addition to music, Bachmann also studied German and Philosophy. In October 2011 she received the Federal Cross of Merit for her involvement in musical work with children and adolescents.

=== Iris Siegfried ===
Iris Siegfried, also born 1972 in Hamburg, was also a prize winner of the Jugend musiziert competition. Soon she discovered her vocal talents in performances with various choirs and a cappella groups. Alongside her musical studies, she graduated in 2000 with a degree in law. Since then she has worked as a lawyer for a Hamburg law practice specialising in competition and copyright law. In addition, she took a second degree as a culture manager from the Hochschule für Musik und Theater Hamburg. As of 2008, she is a lecturer at the Institut für Kultur- und Medienmanagement at that university, and from 2018 became a professor at that university. In October 2011, she received the Federal Cross of Merit. She left Salut Salon in November 2022 after 22 years.

=== Sonja Lena Schmid ===
Sonja Lena Schmid was born in Tübingen in 1981. She studied cello and chamber music in Hamburg, Amsterdam, the Hague and Lübeck, and has won many awards and grants, including a grant from Die Zeit, the Dutch Huygens grant, the first prize in the Charles Hennen Concours International Chamber Music Competition and a special prize in the international competition "Schubert and the Music of Modern Times". An avid theatre fan, Schmid has performed in productions at the Thalia Theater in Hamburg, the Deutsches Schauspielhaus, and the Munich Biennale.

=== Anne-Monika von Twardowski ===
Anne-Monika von Twardowski, born in 1982 in Durban, South Africa, moved to Germany when she was only six years old, where she had her first piano lessons. From 2002 to 2011, she studied piano teaching and performance, and musical arts at the Musikhochschule Lübeck, where Barbara Martini, Jacob Leuschner and David Meier were her teachers. She studied abroad in 2005 and 2006 in Barcelona at the Escola Superior de Música Catalunya where Alan Branch, among others, were her teachers. von Twardowski is passionate about community service, and as of June 2012 she has been involved as a sponsor of the project "Schule mit Courage – Schule ohne Rassismus" (School with courage – School without racism) at the Theodor-Heuss-Schule in Pinneberg near Hamburg.

== Members ==
=== Current members ===
- Angelika Bachmann: violin (founder of the quartet)
- Sonja Lena Schmid: cello (since 2008)
- Anne von Twardowski: piano (since 2008)
- Since 2010: Frederike Dany: cello (backup)
- Since 2014: Olga Shkrygunova: piano (backup)
- Since 2016: Meta Hüper: violin, vocals (backup)
- Since 2017: Rahel Maria Rilling: violin (backup)

=== Past members ===
- Ameli Winkler, piano (2000–2002)
- Simone Bachmann, cello (2000–2002)
- Christine Schütze, piano (2002–2005)
- Gesa Riedel, cello (2002–2005)
- Phoebe Scott, cello (2002–2005)
- Lara Jones, piano (2005–2008)
- Peiwen Chen, cello (2005–2007)
- Jule Hinrichsen, cello (2007–2008)
- Valeria Stab, piano (2007–2010)
- Iris Siegfried: violin, vocals (2000-2022, founder of the quartet)

== Awards ==
- 2004: Advancement award „inventio“ by the German Music Council and the foundation „100 Jahre Yamaha“
- 2016: Echo Klassik 2016 in the category "Klassik ohne Grenzen"

== Discography ==
=== CDs ===
- Was kann das Herz dafür (2005)
- Herzenssache (2007)
- Dichtung und Wahrheit. Das Beste aus 10 Jahren (2013)
- Christmas with Salut Salon (2014)
- Salut Salon Live (2015)

=== DVDs ===
- Klassisch verführt (2009)
- Salut Salon. Der Film (2012)
- A Carnival of the Animals and other Fantasies (CD, DVD, 2016)
