= World Horti-Expo Garden =

Botanical garden center in Kunming, China

Coordinates: 25°04′18″N 102°45′34″E

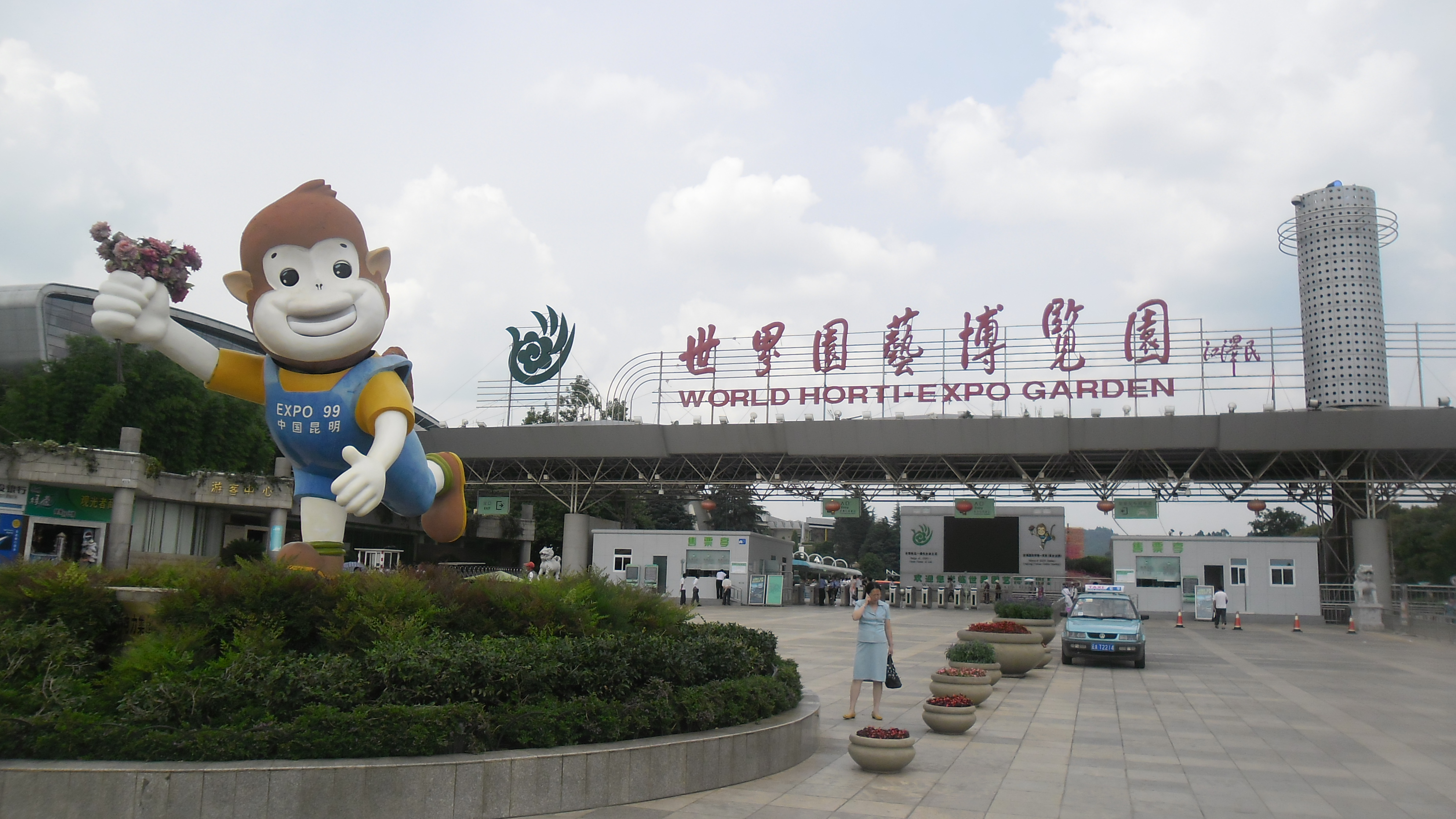
World Horti-Expo Garden Entrance

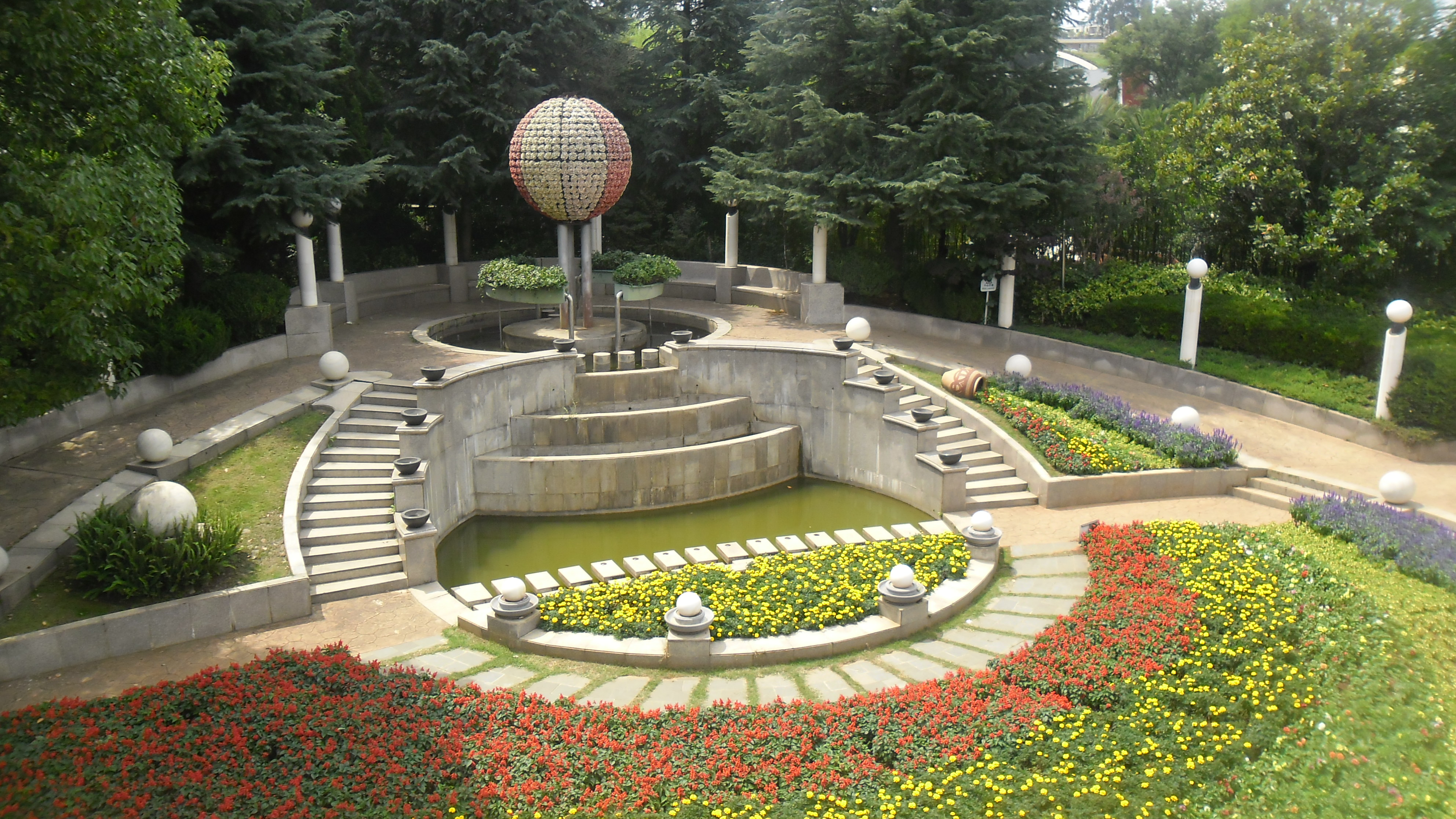
World Horti-Expo Garden

The World Horti-Expo Garden is a botanical garden center in Kunming, China. It played host to the October 1999 Kunming International Horticulture Exposition. As an international botanical garden, the Expo Garden has become a significant Kunming landmark.

The World Horti-Expo Garden covers an area of 218 hectares and consists of 5 indoor exhibition halls (China Hall, the Man and Nature Hall, the Green House, the Science and Technology Hall, and the International Hall), 6 theme gardens (the Tree Garden, the Tea Garden, the Bonsai Garden, the Medicinal Herb Garden, the Bamboo Garden, and the Vegetable and Fruit Garden) and 34 outdoor gardens of domestic participants, 34 outdoor gardens for foreign countries and international organizational and 9 outdoor exhibition area for the enterprise participants.

The World Horti-Expo Garden was designed to be in "perfect harmony" with the surrounding mountains, waters and forest, showing that it originates from and return to the nature. It has hosted a large collection of horticultural and gardening works from different Chinese provinces and municipalities, and also from all over the world.

== Metro Station ==
World Horti-Expo Park station is located near the entrance to the park. It is the terminus of Line 5 of the Kunming Metro.
