= Expo 2010 emblem =

The Expo 2010 emblem was the official emblem used during the 2010 Shanghai World Expo.

== Description ==
The emblem depicts a stylised image of three people representing the concept of you, me and him/her. The three people are holding hands which symbolises the family of mankind. The overall form was inspired by the Chinese character "世" ("shi", meaning the world) which represents the ideals for a truly global scale event in the World Expo (世博会 in Chinese). The emblem is designed with a calligraphic quality representing Chinese culture. The organisers also wanted the Expo to showcase the diverse urban cultures of the world. The predominantly green colour represents the world and the balance of the natural world. It highlights that sustainable development in the future is a pivotal part of the Expo's theme "Better City Better Life". In the emblem, the word "shi" is connected to the styled Arabic numerals 2010. The typeface of the emblem reads "Expo 2010 Shanghai China".

== Designer ==
The designer of the emblem is 34-year-old Shao Honggeng. He said "I hope that the quintessence of Chinese calligraphic representation will express the World Expo's philosophy of "understanding, communication, togetherness and cooperation".

== Expo 2010 Volunteer emblem ==
The official Volunteer emblem consists of a coloured ribbon arranged in the shape of the letter V (for Volunteer) as well as the Chinese character for heart (心). It also appears to make an outline of the shape of a dove, symbolising friendship and peace. The logo represents the spirit of volunteering and community.

== See also ==
- Expo 2010
