= Expo '99 =

International festival in Yunnan, China

EXPO 1999 Kunming
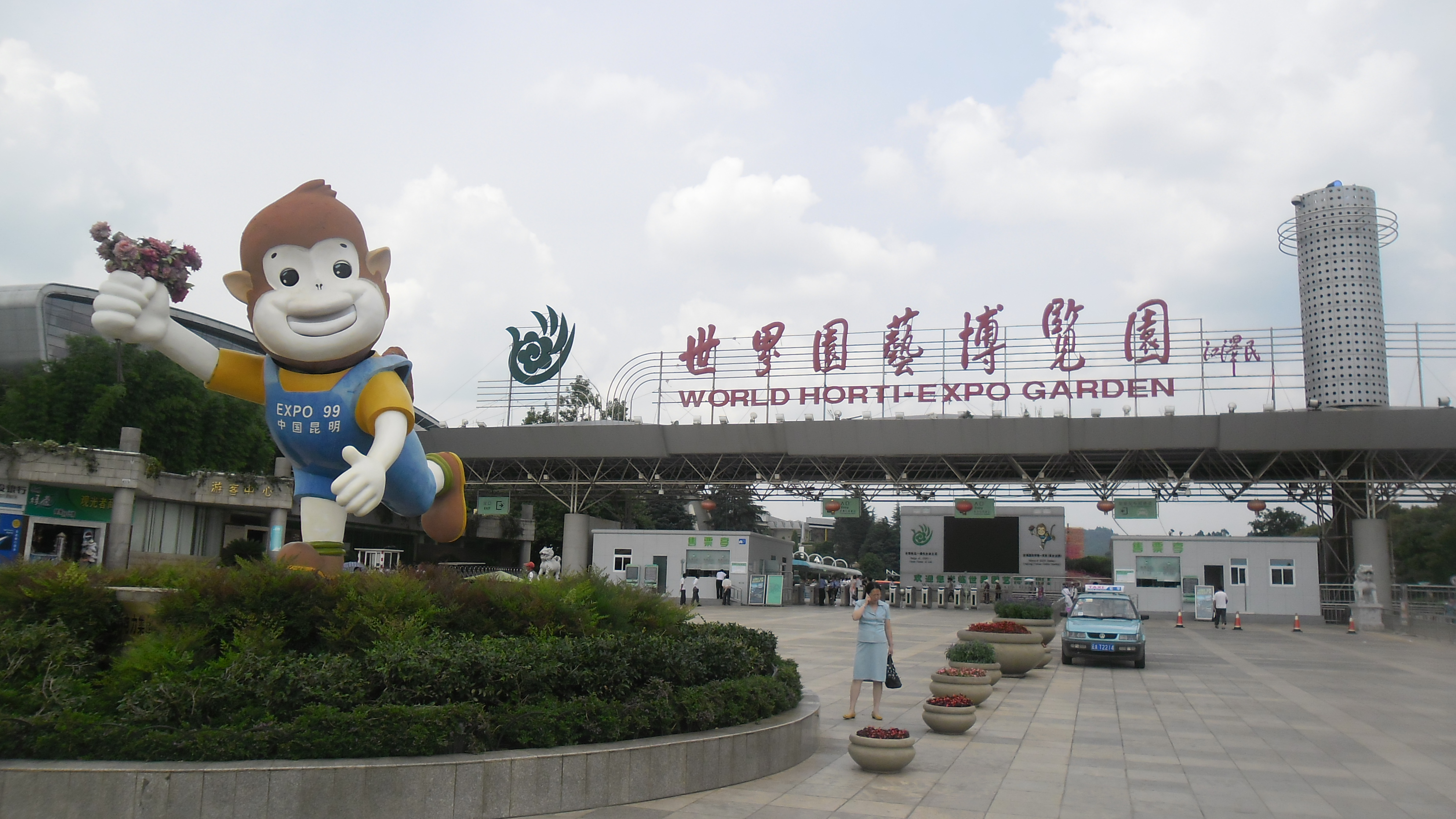
- World Horti-Expo Garden Entrance with 1999 World Horticultural Exposition mascot

Overview
- BIE-class: Horticultural exposition
- Name: 1999 World Horticultural Exposition
- Motto: Man and Nature, marching into the 21st century
- Area: 538 acres
- Visitors: 9,430,000
- Mascot: Ling Ling

Participant(s)
- Countries: 69

Location
- Country: China
- City: Kunming
- Venue: World Horti-Expo Garden
- Coordinates: 25°4′17.6″N 102°45′33.8″E

Timeline
- Awarded: June 5, 1996
- Opening: April 30, 1999
- Closure: October 31, 1999

Horticultural expositions
- Previous: Expo '93 in Stuttgart
- Next: Expo 2002 in Haarlemmermeer

Specialized expositions
- Previous: Expo '98 in Lisbon
- Next: Expo 2005 in Nagoya

Universal expositions
- Previous: Expo '92 in Seville
- Next: Expo 2000 in Hannover

The Expo '99 was an A1 category international horticultural exposition recognised by the Bureau International des Expositions (BIE). Organised under the auspices of the International Association of Horticultural Producers, the event was held in Kunming, Yunnan, China. The theme of the exposition was "Man and Nature, marching into the 21st century."

The event took place in the World Horti-Expo Garden. It lasted from April 30 to October 31, 1999, and attracted 9.5 million visitors.

== Mascot ==
The mascot of the Exposition, "Ling Ling" (灵灵), represents a black-and-white snub-nosed monkey, also referred to as a Yunnan golden hair monkey or Dian golden monkey (滇金丝猴). 'Dian' (滇) is an abbreviation for 'Yunnan'.

== See also ==
- History of Shanghai expo
