= Mandarin's House =

Residential complex in Macau, China

Coordinates: 22.1886°N 113.5350°E

- 鄭家大屋; Casa do Mandarim
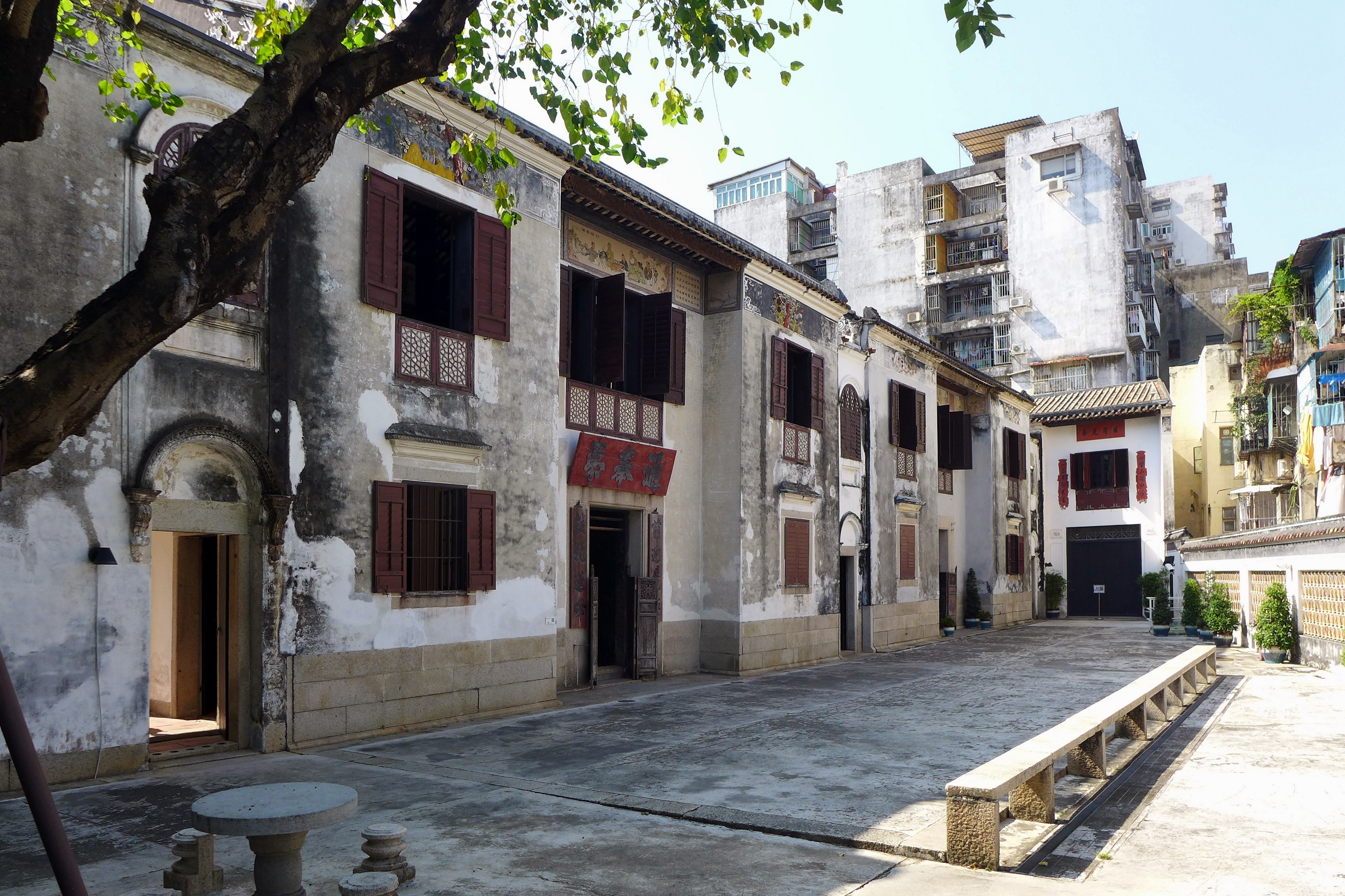
- The Mandarin's House in 2023

General information
- Location: No. 10, Travessa de António da Silva, Macau, Macau
- Completed: 1869
- Renovated: 2002–2010
- Owner: Zheng Guanying's Family (formerly)

Technical details
- Floor count: 2

Other information
- Number of rooms: more than 60

Mandarin's House

Chinese name
- Traditional Chinese: 鄭家大屋
- Simplified Chinese: 郑家大屋
Transcriptions
Standard Mandarin
- Hanyu Pinyin: Zhèngjiā Dàwū
Yue: Cantonese
- Jyutping: zeng6 gaa1 daai6 uk1

Portuguese name
- Portuguese: Casa do Mandarim

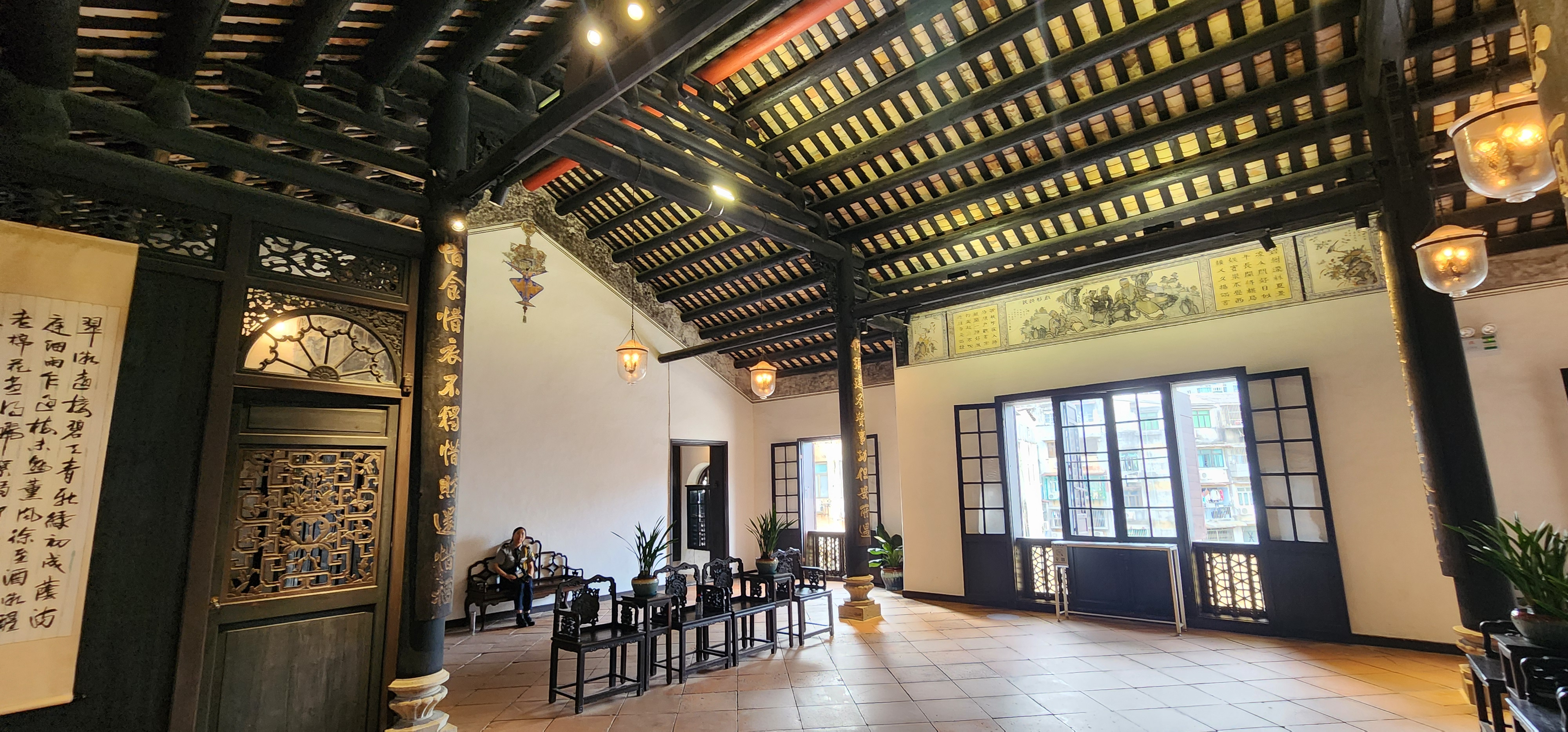
Interior of the Mandarin's House.

The Mandarin's House (Chinese: 鄭家大屋; Portuguese: Casa do Mandarim & Casa da Cheang) is a historic residential complex in São Lourenço, Macau. It was the residence and family home of the late Qing theoretician and reformist Zheng Guanying (1842–1921). He completed his masterpiece Shengshi Weiyan (Words of Warning in Times of Prosperity) in the house. The Mandarin's House occupies an area of 4,000 square metres (43,000 sq ft) and is among the largest family houses in Macau.

== History ==
The Mandarin's House was built in 1869 (eighth year of the reign of the Tongzhi Emperor) by Zheng Guanyin's father Zheng Wenrui. Zheng Guanying and his brothers gradually enlarged the complex since. It was built largely in Cantonese style but is noted for its fusion of western architectural elements.

In 1990s, the Zheng family gradually moved out and the house was then rented out. There were at once more than 300 tenants living inside the complex, resulting in poor living conditions.

The house was 4,000 square meters. The house was badly damaged because of a fire, and it took eight years to fix the house.

The government overtook the complex in 2001. In 2005, the house was listed as part of the Historic Centre of Macau, a UNESCO World Heritage Site.

== See also ==
- List of oldest buildings and structures in Macau
