= Expo 2010 =

World Expo held in Shanghai, China

2010 Shanghai
- Expo 2010 logo

Overview
- BIE-class: Universal exposition
- Category: International Registered Exhibition
- Name: Expo 2010
- Motto: Better City – Better Life (城市，让生活更美好)
- Area: 523 hectares (1,290 acres)
- Visitors: 73,085,000
- Mascot: Haibao

Participant(s)
- Countries: 192

Location
- Country: China
- City: Shanghai
- Coordinates: 31°11′39″N 121°29′11″E

Timeline
- Awarded: 3 December 2002
- Opening: 1 May 2010
- Closure: 31 October 2010

Universal expositions
- Previous: Expo 2005 in Aichi
- Next: Expo 2015 in Milan

Specialized expositions
- Previous: Expo 2008 in Zaragoza
- Next: Expo 2012 in Yeosu

Horticultural expositions
- Previous: Expo 2006 in Chiang Mai
- Next: Expo 2012 in Venlo

Internet
- Website: Expo 2010 Shanghai China at the Wayback Machine (Archived on 2012-12-18)

Chinese name
- Simplified Chinese: 中国2010年上海世界博览会
- Traditional Chinese: 中國2010年上海世界博覽會
Transcriptions
Standard Mandarin
- Hanyu Pinyin: Zhōngguó 2010 Nián Shànghǎi Shìjìe Bólǎnhuì
Wu
- Romanization: Tson^{平}koh^{入} 2010-Nyie^{平} Zaon^{去}he^{上} Sy^{去}ka^{去} Poh^{入}lae^{上}we^{去}
Hakka
- Romanization: Chûng-koet 2010-ngièn Sông-hói Sṳ-kie Pok-lám-fi
Yue: Cantonese
- Jyutping: Zung^{1}gwok^{3} 2010-Nin^{4} Soeng^{6}hoi^{2} Sai^{3}gaai^{3} Bok^{3}laam^{5}wui^{6*2}
Southern Min
- Hokkien POJ: Tiong-kok 2010-Nî Siōng-hái Sè-kài Phok-lám-hoē

"Expo"
- Simplified Chinese: 世博会
- Traditional Chinese: 世博會
Transcriptions
Standard Mandarin
- Hanyu Pinyin: Shìbóhuì
Wu
- Romanization: Sy^{去}poh^{入}we^{去}
Hakka
- Romanization: Sṳ-pok-fi
Yue: Cantonese
- Jyutping: Sai^{3}bok^{3}wui^{6*2}
Southern Min
- Hokkien POJ: Sè-phok-hoē

Expo 2010, officially the Expo 2010 Shanghai China, was held on both banks of the Huangpu River in Shanghai, China, from 1 May to 31 October 2010. It was a major World Expo registered by the Bureau International des Expositions (BIE), in the tradition of international fairs and expositions, the first since 2005. The theme of the exposition was "Better City – Better Life" and signifies Shanghai's new status in the 21st century as the "next great world city". The Expo emblem features the Chinese character 世 ('world', Chinese "shì") modified to represent three people together with the 2010 date. It had the largest number of countries participating and was the most expensive Expo in the history of the world's fairs. The Shanghai World Expo was also the largest World's Fair site ever at 5.28 square km.

By the end of the expo, over 73 million people had visited – a record attendance – and 246 countries and international organizations had participated. On 16 October 2010, the expo set a single-day record of over 1.03 million visitors.

== History ==
=== Early participation and hosting ===
Shanghai has been one of the main cities envisioned to host the expos for some time. Many scholars have written about the possibility and made suggestions in books. Unofficial participation in fairs outside China have happened since 1851. In 1910, the Qing dynasty decided to host China's first fair with the Nanyang Industrial Exposition in Nanjing (then usually spelled Nanking).

=== Selection process ===
Shanghai scored the highest in each of the four rounds of voting at the 132nd Meeting of the Bureau of International Expositions in Prince's Palace of Monaco, Monte Carlo, Monaco, with Yeosu, South Korea maintaining second place.

132nd Meeting of the Bureau of International Expositions; 3 December 2002, in Prince's Palace of Monaco, Monte Carlo, Monaco
City	Nation	Round 1	Round 2	Round 3	Round 4
Shanghai	China	36	38	44	54
Yeosu	South Korea	28	34	32	34
Moscow	Russia	12	10	12	-
Querétaro	Mexico	6	6	-	-
Wrocław	Poland	6	-	-	-

== Organization ==
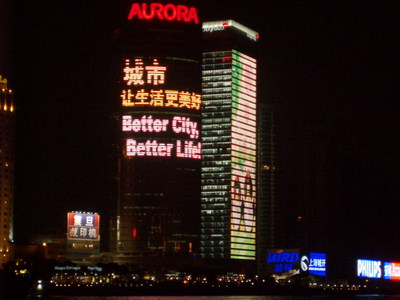
Better City, Better Life, the theme of Expo 2010.

In 2004, the Chinese central government established the Shanghai World Expo Organising Committee as the organization dedicated to host the event. The Organising Committee set up an executive committee which is responsible for the execution and management of expo affairs. Besides, the Shanghai World Expo Coordination is founded for the daily affairs of the executive committee.

The site of the event was the Nanpu Bridge–Lupu Bridge region in the center of Shanghai along both sides of the Huangpu River. The area of the Expo 2010 covers 5.28 km^{2}.

After winning the bid to host the Expo in 2002, Shanghai began a monumental task to reshape the city. More than $48 billion was spent for the preparation, more than the cost of cleaning up Beijing in the preparations for the Olympics in 2008. Shanghai began clearing 2.6 square kilometres along the Huangpu River; that involved moving 18,000 families and 270 factories, including the Jiang Nan Shipyard, which employs 10,000 workers.

Six new subway lines were opened between 2008 and 2010; four thousand brand new taxis were added in the month before Expo 2010 opened and the city's buildings along the river were decorated with more energy-efficient LEDs.

During the expo, the expo site was crowded with national pavilions, sculpture gardens, shops, a sports arena and clam-shaped performing arts centre.

Shanghai trained more than 1.7 million volunteers and adopted Olympic-level security measures, adding metal detectors to subway entrances and screening cars entering the city.

The Shanghai Expo also featured an online version of the expo grounds featuring 3D renderings of the expo grounds, and a 3D version of the pavilion interior and offerings.

== Participation ==
The Shanghai World Expo provided an unparalleled opportunity for the tourism industry. During 2010's Spring Festival, Shanghai received 2.79 million tourists, an increase of 12 percent from the previous year, resulting in record high numbers of visitors. Overall Shanghai's tourism revenue achieved an increase of 13 percent year on year during Spring Festival, resulting in RMB 2.1 billion in total revenue.

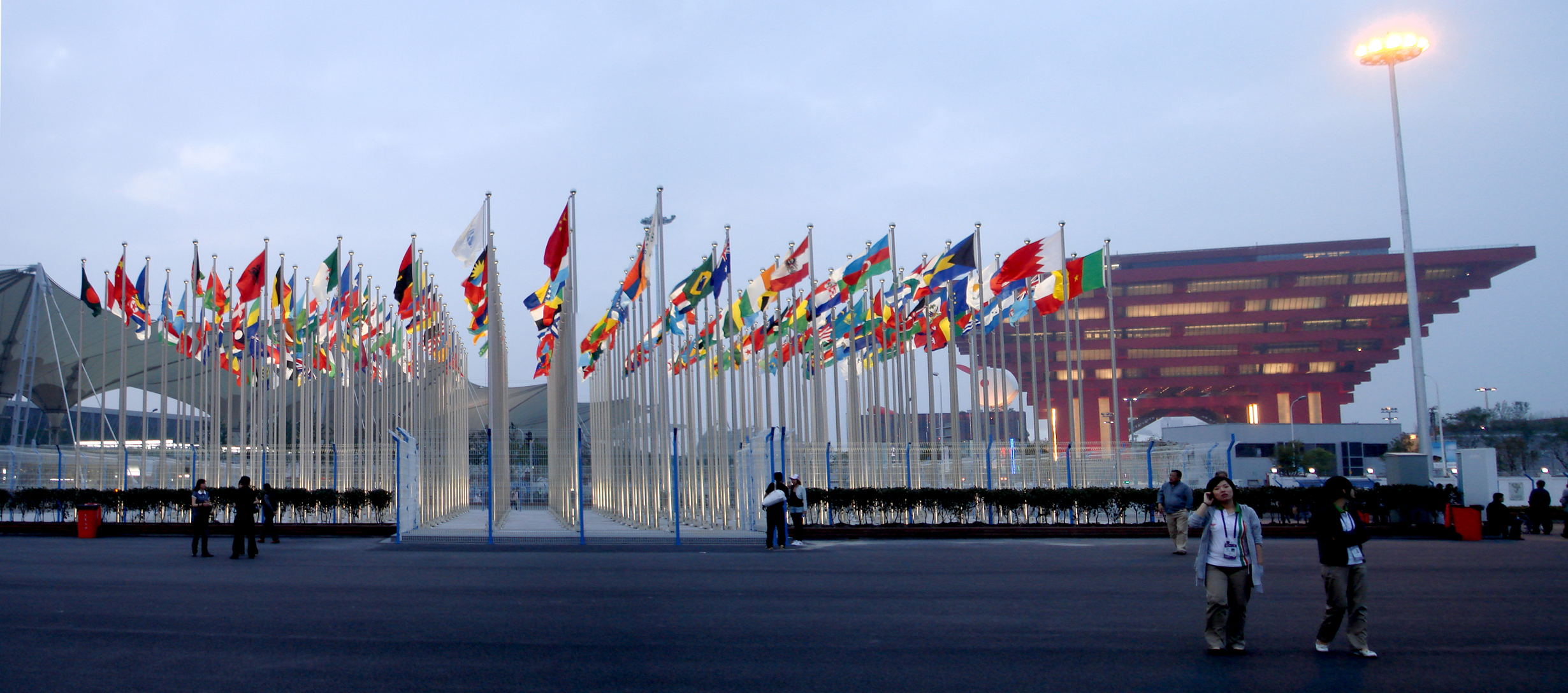
Flags of participating countries waving in front of the China pavilion.

192 countries and 50 organizations registered to participate in the Shanghai World Expo, a record number for that time.

== Attendance ==
Over 73 million people visited Expo 2010 during the 184-day event, breaking the previous record of 64 million visitors set by Expo 70 in Osaka. Organizers had expected 70 million visitors at the start of the expo. About 5.8 percent of the visitors, or 4.25 million, were foreigners.

== Finances ==
Shanghai spent 11.964 billion yuan in operating cost to host the event, making it the most expensive World Expo ever, but the organizers still made an operating profit of more than 1 billion yuan (US$157 million) thanks to the record attendance. The total revenue was 13.014 billion yuan, including 7.36 billion yuan in admission fees and almost 4 billion yuan in sponsorship income. However, the city invested another 19.74 billion yuan to prepare and construct the 5.28 square kilometer site, exceeding the budget of 18 billion yuan.

== Opening ceremony ==
Opening ceremony fireworks finale, viewed from below Nanpu Bridge

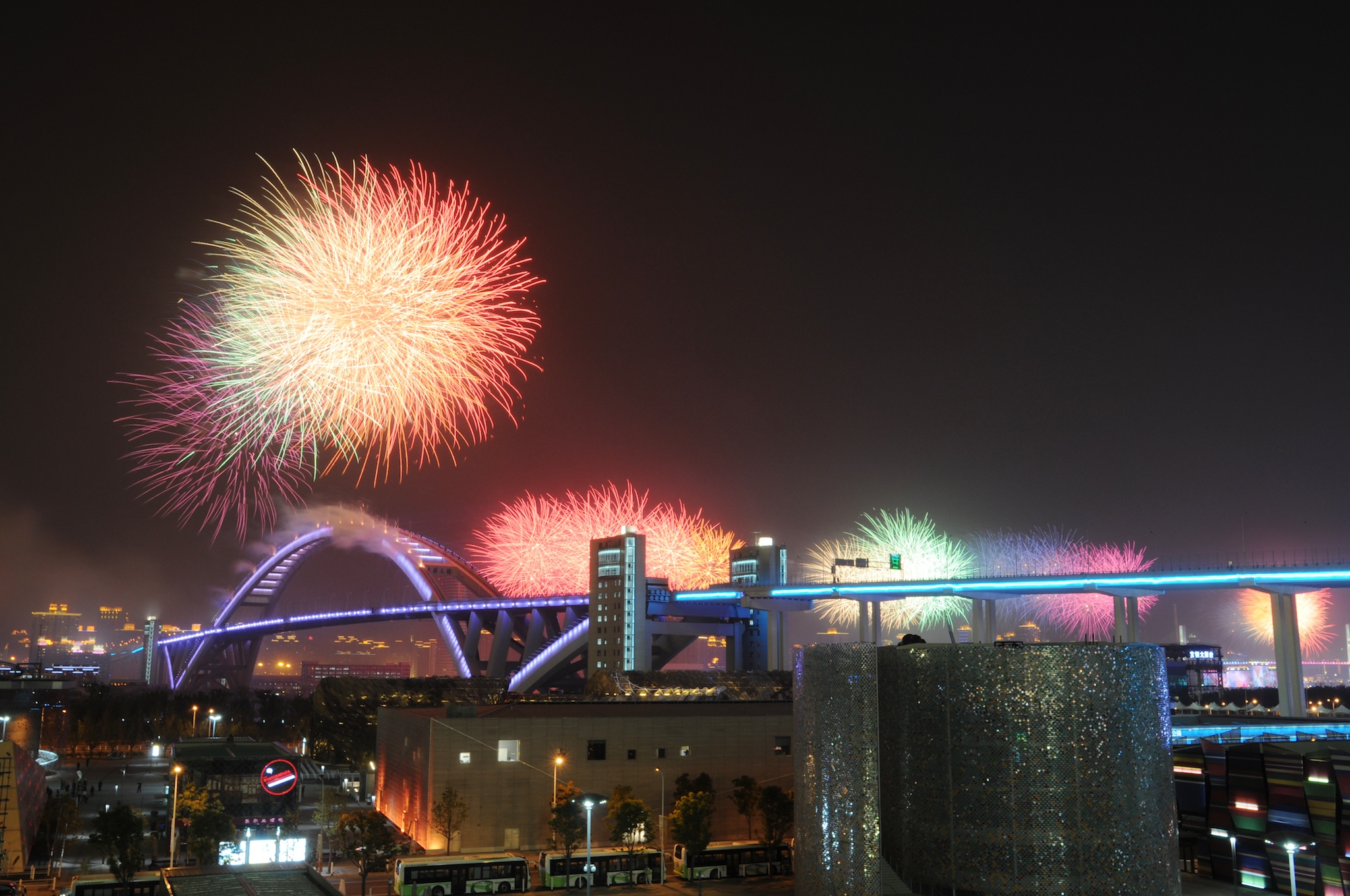
Fireworks at the Expo site

The opening ceremony was held in the evening of 30 April 2010 attended by dozens of world leaders. The ceremony consisted of an indoor and outdoor component. Jackie Chan, Lang Lang, and Andrea Bocelli were among the performers in the indoor component. The event featured an outdoor display of fireworks, lasers, and dancing fountains after a performance by singers and dancers. The outdoor ceremony was produced by David Atkins Enterprises. 6,000 LED balls were floated into the Huangpu River representing fish. Organisers called the outdoor show "the largest searchlight display in history, the largest collection of multi-coloured laser firepower ever assembled in one place, the world's largest LED screen, one of the largest dancing water fountains ever, and the "largest light show ever attempted"." General Secretary of the Chinese Communist Party Hu Jintao inaugurated the opening of the Shanghai World Expo.

== Closing ceremony ==
The closing ceremony was held on 31 October 2010, with numerous world leaders in attendance including Wen Jiabao, Prime Minister of China, Sri Lanka's President Mahinda Rajapaksa, Viktor Orbán, Prime Minister of Hungary, Mari Kiviniemi, Prime Minister of Finland, Hubert Ingraham, Prime Minister of Bahamas, Pakalitha Mosisili, Prime Minister of Lesotho, Ram Baran Yadav, President of Nepal and Ban Ki-moon, Secretary-General of the United Nations.

== Expo music ==
=== Performances ===
About 20,000 performances were set to be staged between 1 May and 31 October in 2010, many singers present at the expo song writing and preparation process since 2008. Performers included Alan Tam, Gigi Leung, Stephanie Cheng, Khalil Fong, Hacken Lee, Denise Ho, Hins Cheung, Vincy Chan, Philadelphia Boys Choir, National Boys Choir of Australia, Salut Salon, the Cross Border Orchestra of Ireland and the Harvard Din & Tonics, and others.

=== Theme songs ===
- The official theme songs of the Expo were "City" by Jackie Chan and "Better City, Better Life" by Quincy Jones.
- The promotional song of the Expo was "Right Here Waiting for You 2010" (Chinese: 2010等你来; pinyin: èr líng yī líng děng nǐ lái). Released during the 30-day countdown on 1 April, Right Here Waiting for You 2010 was plagiarized from the 1997 Japanese song "Sonomama no Kimi de Ite" ("Stay the Way You Are") by Mayo Okamoto. This resulted in its use as the Expo theme being suspended. After discussions with Okamoto's management, a compromise was reached such that "Sonomama no Kimi de Ite" is now the official song of the 2010 Expo
- The theme song for Shanghai World Expo volunteers was "By Your Side" (simplified Chinese: 在你身边; traditional Chinese: 在你身邊; pinyin: zài nǐ shēn biān) by Eason Chan.
- The theme song for the Shanghai World Expo for the Chinese culture was "The World Watching China", sung by Chinese singer Han Geng.
- The theme song for Norway was "Powered By Nature" which was composed by Rolf Løvland and performed by his group Secret Garden. The song was recorded for their 2011 album Winter Poem.

== Mascot ==
Haibao was the mascot of the Shanghai Expo 2010. It means treasure of the sea and was based on the Chinese character for man or person, "人". Some said that Haibao resembles Gumby, but the expo's secretariat said that it was an original design chosen through a competition and that they had never heard of Gumby.

== Expo Axis ==
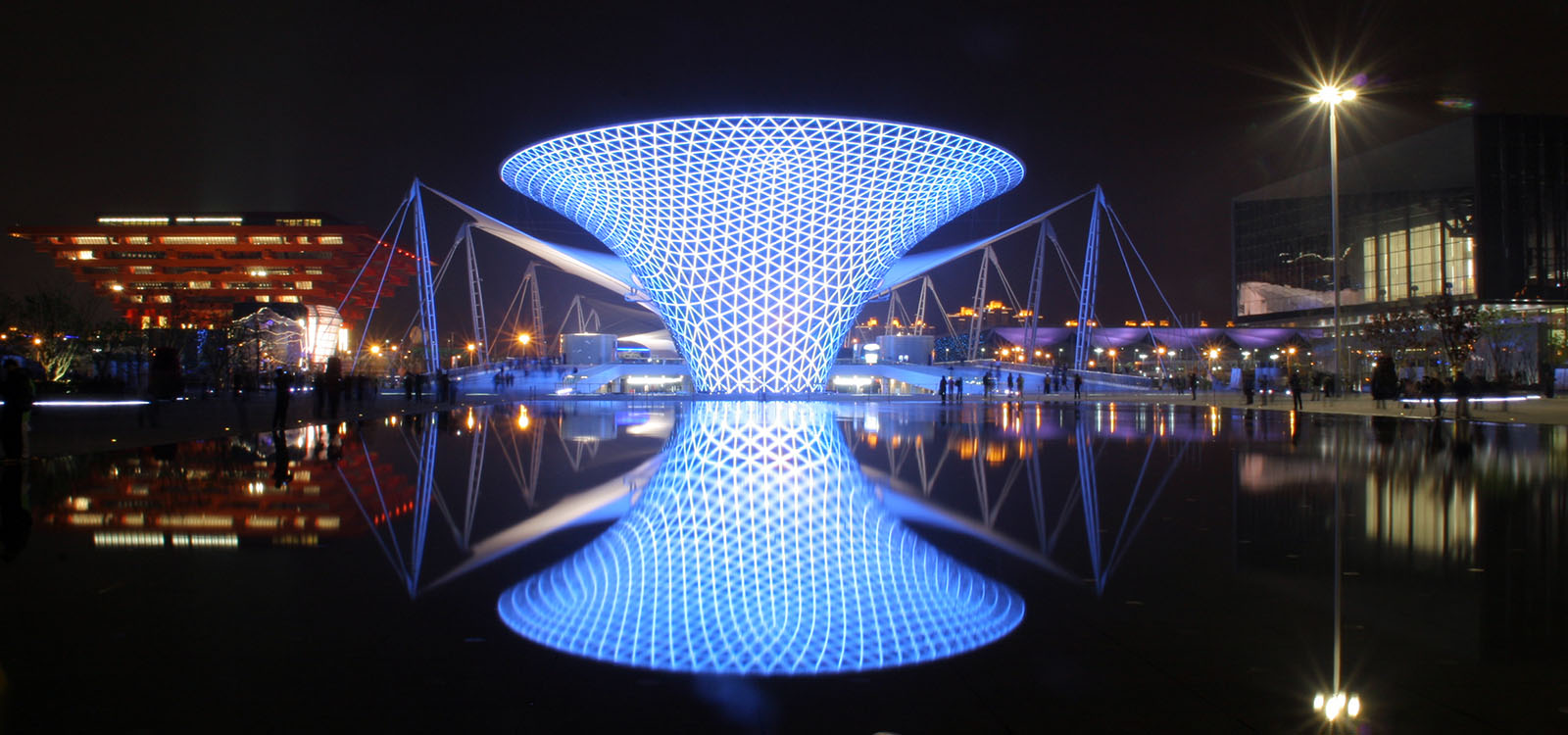
Expo Axis at night

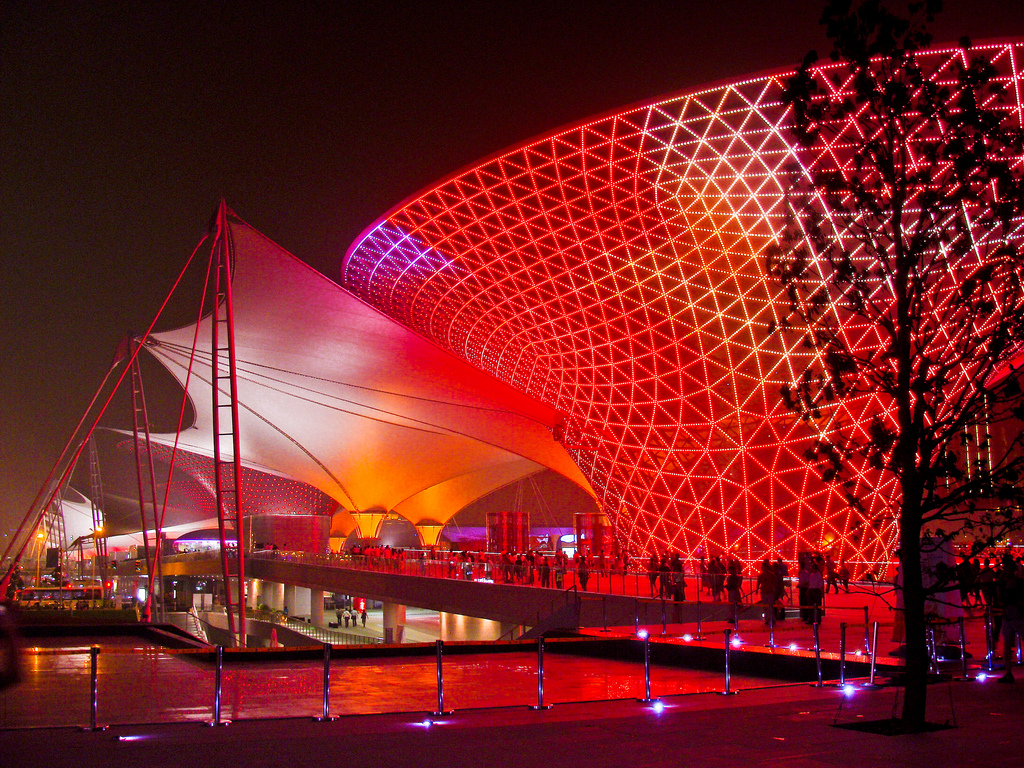
Expo Axis

The main building – called "Expo Axis" – has the world's largest membrane construction and was built by SBA (architects) and Knippers Helbig (structural engineers). The building consists of some steel-glass funnels with a 1,000 m long membrane construction. The main construction was completed at the end of 2009.

== Pavilions ==
=== Theme pavilions ===
There were five central theme pavilions at the Expo 2010, exploring different aspects of urban development. They were called Urban Footprints, Urban Planet, Urbanian, City Being, and Urban Future.

=== National pavilions ===
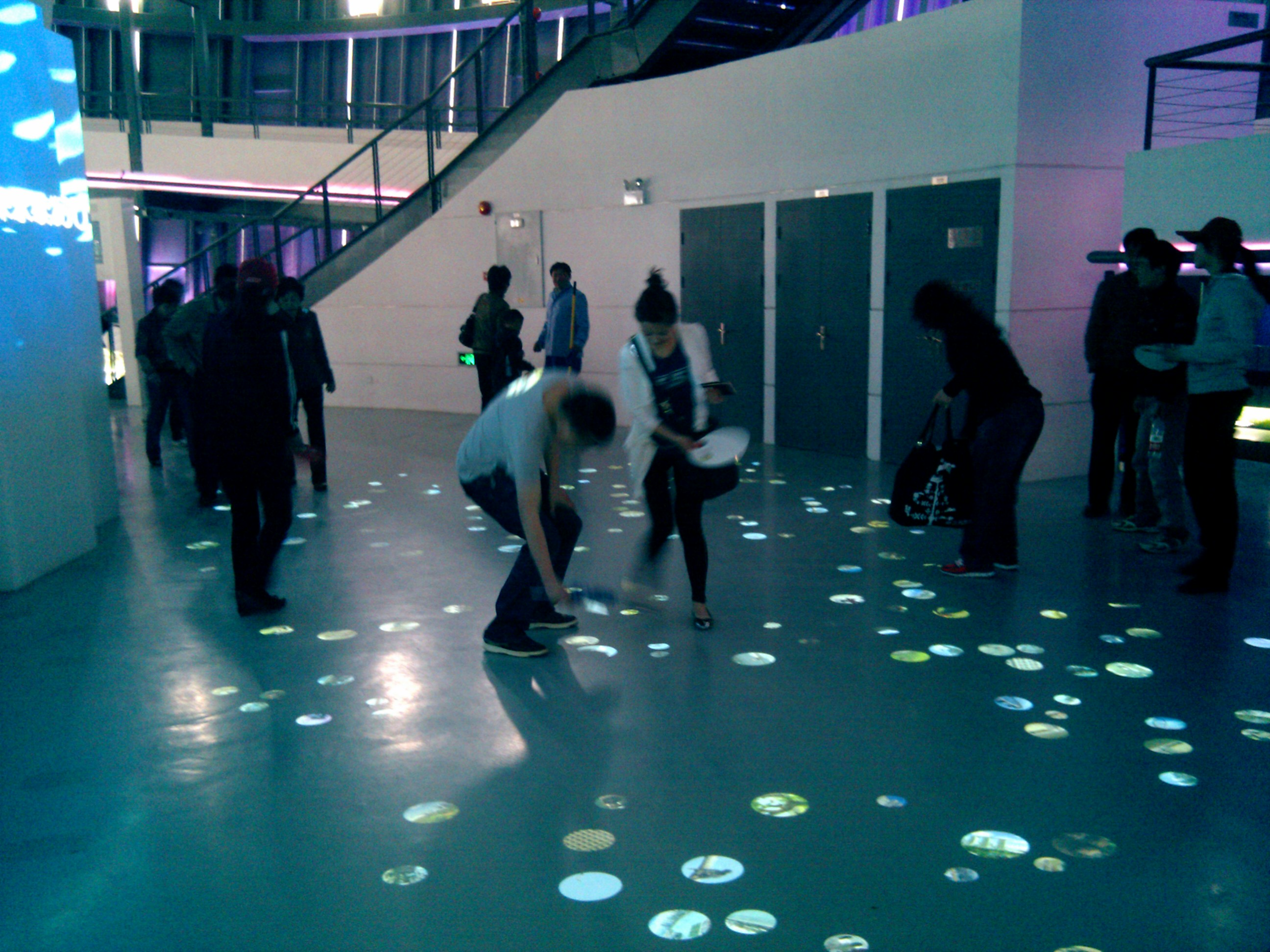

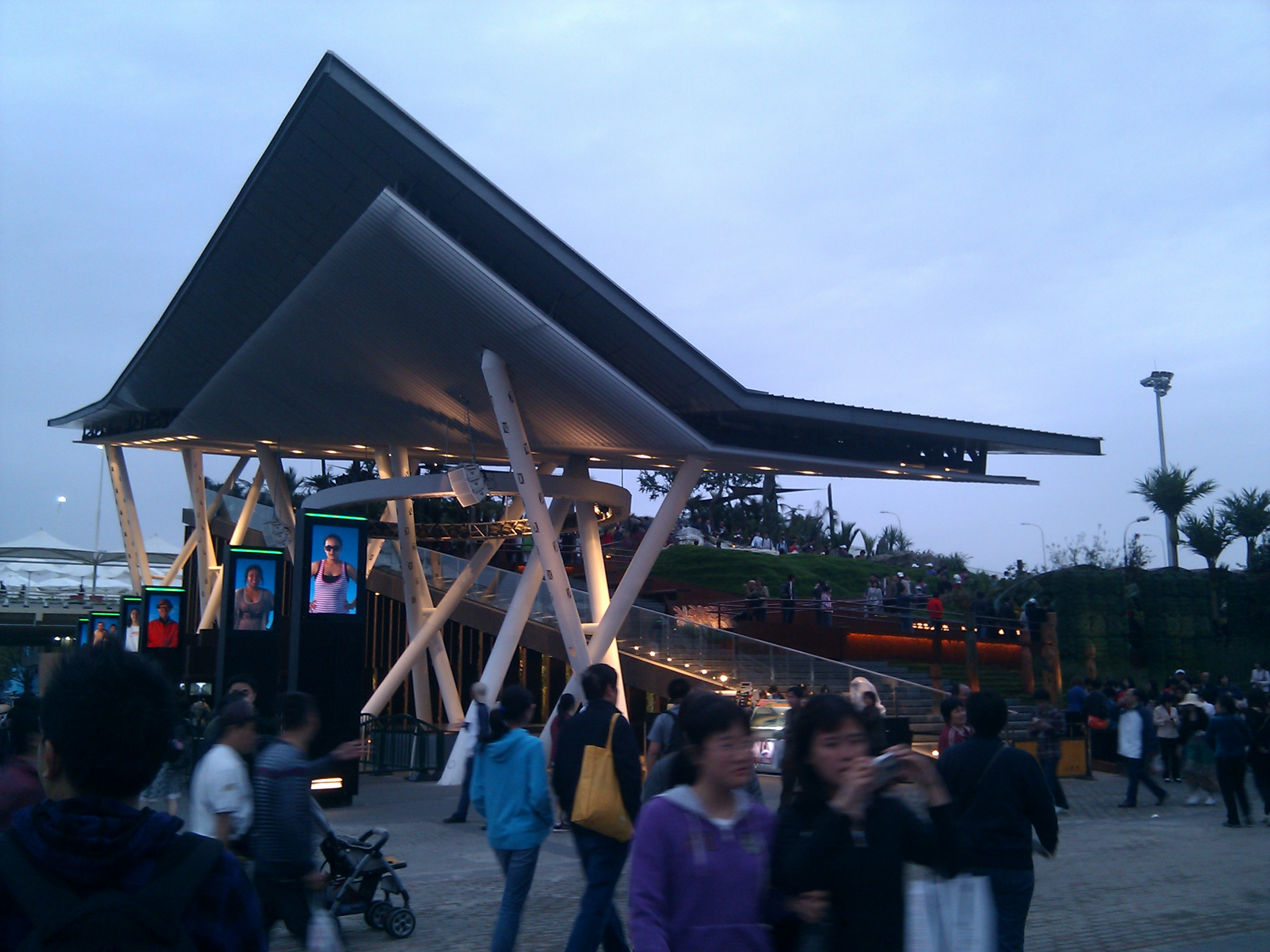

National pavilions included: Algeria, Angola, Argentina, Australia, Austria, Bangladesh, Belarus, Belgium, Bosnia and Herzegovina, Brazil, Brunei Darussalam, Canada, Cambodia, Chile, China, Colombia, Costa Rica, Croatia, Cuba, Czech Republic, Denmark, Dominican Republic, Ecuador, Egypt, Estonia, Finland, France, Germany, Greece, Hong Kong, Hungary, Iceland, India, Indonesia, Iran, Iraq, Ireland, Israel, Italy, Japan, Jordan, Kazakhstan, Kenya, Kyrgyzstan, Latvia, Lebanon, Libya, Lithuania, Luxembourg, Macau, Macedonia, Malaysia, Malta, Mexico, Monaco, Mongolia, Morocco, Myanmar, Nepal, Netherlands, New Zealand, Nigeria, North Korea, Norway, Oman, Pacific Pavilion, Pakistan, Palestine, Peru, Philippines, Poland, Portugal, Romania, Russia, Saudi Arabia, Serbia, Singapore, Slovakia, Slovenia, South Africa, South Korea, Spain, Sri Lanka, Sweden, Switzerland, Taiwan, Thailand, Timor-Leste, Tunisia, Turkey, Turkmenistan, Ukraine, United Arab Emirates, United Kingdom, United States, Uruguay, Uzbekistan, Venezuela, Vietnam and Yemen.

=== Corporate pavilions ===
Corporate pavilions included: Aurora Pavilion, Broad Pavilion, China Railway, China State Shipbuilding Corporation Pavilion, Coca-Cola Pavilion, Cisco Pavilion, Information and Communication Pavilion, Oil Pavilion, Japanese Industry, PICC, Private Enterprises Joint Pavilion, Republic of Korea Business, SAIC-GM Pavilion, Shanghai Corporate Joint Pavilion, Space Pavilion, Space Home Pavilion, State Grid and Vanke Pavilion.

=== International organizations ===
The Expo also included a pavilion for the Red Cross and Red Crescent and several others.

=== Urban Best Practice Area pavilions ===
The Urban Best Practice Area allowed cities and regions an opportunity to share experiences of improving urban living. San Francisco (a Shanghai sister city) was one participant here, as were Dafeng Town in Shenzhen, Hangzhou, Liverpool, London, Montreal, Rotterdam and Seoul.

The Expo also included Japanese displays about Hong Kong and Ningbo.

== Legacy ==
The Expo introduced numerous urban best practices and concepts from all over the world which the organisers hope will be a lasting legacy for better urban life in China and around the world. It advocated for future development to focus on environmental sustainability, efficiency and diversity. The innovations and achievements of the event were summarised in the Shanghai Declaration issued by the participants of the Expo. The declaration also nominated the Shanghai Expo's closing day 31 October as "World Better Cities Day". United Nations Secretary-General Ban Ki-moon stated at the closing of the Expo, "Thanks to this Expo, millions of people learned about possibilities for making our cities healthier and safer, cities that better integrate nature and technology, cities that offer their citizens cleaner air and water, and better lives all around".

Within Shanghai, the grounds of the former Expo site now constitute the Expo Park, including the former China Pavilion. The Bureau of International Expositions (BIE) and the Shanghai government have announced plans to construct the world's only official World Expo Museum in Shanghai, on the Puxi side of the expo site. Construction began in 2012, and the museum opened its doors on 1 May 2017. More than 200 participants from Expo 2010 have donated over 30,000 exhibits to the future museum. The BIE has added into its formal requirements that all future Expo bidders shall support the new Expo Museum.

The Shanghai Expo was touted by the Chinese government as yet another first-rate global scale event, similar in significance to the Beijing Olympics, which would symbolise the economic and political rise of China in the 21st century. The event would demonstrate to both the Chinese populace and foreign nations the enormous progress of China's urban development in the heart of the nation's economic hub of Shanghai. The event received extensive media coverage in the Chinese media both in the lead up and during the World Expo. According to China analyst Tom Doctoroff, "In terms of what the city was able to achieve, the Chinese were impressed. Shanghai stepped up a level in internationalization". Outside China, the Expo propelled Shanghai onto magazine covers, newspaper front pages and television programmes at a time when it is laying the groundwork to become an international financial centre by 2020.

== Controversies ==
A group of NGOs protested a month before the expo against the alleged displacement of 18,000 families in the Shanghai area in connection with the Expo. Dissident Feng Zhenghu was detained in mid April 2010 for threatening to publicly seek redress for them in the courts. According to the U.S. government-run Congressional-Executive Commission on China, Shanghai authorities used the expo as an excuse to conduct a surveillance, propaganda, and detention campaign against members of the banned Falun Gong spiritual group.

Denmark controversially sent the original Little Mermaid statue from Copenhagen to the expo, putting a video replica recorded by dissident Ai Weiwei in its place. Some observers criticized the Hong Kong and Macao Affairs Office's payment for the 9 Hong Kong undersecretaries to inspect infrastructure projects and hold discussions on city-to-city cooperation. Six legislators from the pro-democracy camp boycotted an invitation to the expo by the Shanghai government because of the issue of political reform and the 2010 Hong Kong by-election. The Chinese government postponed the planned visit of 1,000 Japanese youths to the expo in September because of the 2010 Senkaku boat collision incident, which Japanese prime minister Naoto Kan called regrettable.

State employees were given free one-day vouchers to the expo, and according to one worker, threatened with wage cuts, in order to fulfill the target of 70 million visitors. Long lines at the Germany pavilion caused visitors to shout "Nazi, Nazi" and attack workers, according to general commissioner for Germany's pavilion Dietmar Schmitz. Free tickets to an expo show featuring K-pop group Super Junior caused a stampede that injured 100 people, which spokespersons for the expo and the Korean pavilion allegedly denied.

== See also ==
- 2008 Summer Olympics
- 2008 Summer Paralympics
- 2010 Asian Games
- 2011 Summer Universiade
- Shanghai Expo Park & New International Expo Center
- Urbanization in the People's Republic of China
- Tourism in China
