= Words of Warning to a Prosperous Age =

1893 book by Zheng Guanying

- Author: Zheng Guanying
- Language: Traditional Chinese
- Publication date: 1893
- Publication place: Qing dynasty

Words of Warning to a Prosperous Age or Words of Warning in Times of Prosperity (Chinese: 盛世危言), also translated as Blunt Words in a Time of Prosperity, is a book written by Zheng Guanying that advocates self-strengthening and seeking wealth, and reforms. The Chinese phrase "危言" (Weiyan; pinyin: Wēiyán) refers to upright speech, not dangerous speech.

Words of Warning to a Prosperous Age was completed in 1892 and first published in 1893. In the book, Zheng suggested the establishment of a constitution and a parliament and the adoption of a constitutional monarchy, pointing out that the root cause of the country's weakness and the people' poverty was authoritarian politics. He argues that "armed warfare" is not as good as "commercial warfare".
