= Nanyang Industrial Exposition =

1910 industrial exposition in Nanjing, China

1910 Nanjing, Jiangsu

Overview
- BIE-class: Unrecognized exposition
- Name: Nanyang Industrial Exposition
- Area: 41 acres
- Visitors: 305,000

Participant(s)
- Countries: 15

Location
- Country: Qing Empire (China)
- City: Nanjing, Jiangsu
- Venue: Jiangning District

Timeline
- Opening: 5 June 1910
- Closure: 29 November 1910

Nanyang Industrial Exposition
- Traditional Chinese: 南洋勸業會
- Simplified Chinese: 南洋劝业会
Transcriptions
Standard Mandarin
- Hanyu Pinyin: Nányáng Quànyèhui
- Wade–Giles: Nan-yang Ch'üan-yeh-hui

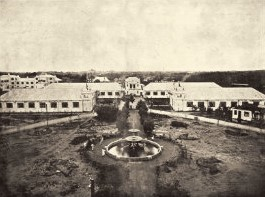

The Nanyang Industrial Exposition, more commonly known as the 1910 Nanking or Nanjing Exposition, was a world's fair held in Nanjing, China, during the end of the Qing dynasty. It opened on 5 June 1910 and lasted 177 days.

== Name ==
The Chinese name of the exposition refers to Nanyang, a region that includes Jiangsu, Jiangxi, and Anhui. At the time, these provinces were all under the Viceroy of Liangjiang, so the event was meant to be an exposition of the entire region.

== Organization ==
On 15 December 1908, Duanfang, the viceroy of Liangjiang, and Chen Qitai, the governor of Jiangsu Province, submitted a petition to the Qing Court proposing that China host an international exposition. It was an official fair backed by the Qing government.

A site of about 41 acres (17 ha) near San Pai Lou in Nanjing's Jiangning District was established for the exhibition. Along a main axis road were several exhibit buildings including the Administration Building, Fine Arts Building, Agriculture Building, Transportation Building, Foreign Exhibit Buildings, and several buildings for various Chinese provinces. Exhibits came from all over China as well as Japan, Dutch East Indies (now Indonesia), the United States, France, Great Britain, and Germany.

== See also ==
- West Lake Exposition
- Shanghai World Expo
