= West Lake Exposition =

1929 world's fair in Hangzhou, China

1929 West Lake Exposition

Overview
- BIE-class: Unrecognized exposition
- Name: 1929 West Lake Exposition
- Visitors: 20,000,000

Location
- Country: Republic of China
- City: Hangzhou, Zhejiang

Timeline
- Opening: 6 June 1929
- Closure: 10 October 1929

West Lake Exposition
- Traditional Chinese: 西湖博覽會
- Simplified Chinese: 西湖博览会
Transcriptions
Standard Mandarin
- Hanyu Pinyin: Xīhú Bólǎnhuì
- Wade–Giles: Hsi-hu Po-lan-hui

The West Lake Exposition was a world's fair held in 1929 around West Lake in Hangzhou (then usually spelled Hangchow), the capital of Zhejiang Province in eastern China. The event opened on 6 June 1929 and lasted 137 days. There were 14,760,000 items on display to the event's 20,000,000 visitors.

The main architect and designer was Liu Jipiao, who devoted six months to organizing and creating the Expo. Having studied art and architecture at L'Ecole des Beaux Arts in Paris, France, he hoped that bringing western art and culture to the Chinese masses would help strengthen and modernize China.

== See also ==
- Warlord Era
- Nanyang Industrial Exposition
- History of the Shanghai Expo
