= Zheng Guanying =

Chinese reformist

- 鄭觀應
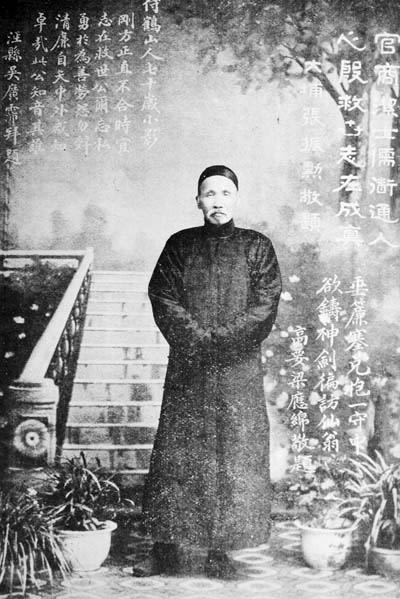
- Born: July 24, 1842; Zhongshan, Guangdong, China
- Died: 1922 (aged 79–80)
- Occupations: Merchant reformer author
- Known for: Chinese nationalist republican advocate

Zheng Guanying
- Traditional Chinese: 鄭觀應
- Simplified Chinese: 郑观应
Transcriptions
Standard Mandarin
- Hanyu Pinyin: Zhèng Guànyìng
- Wade–Giles: Cheng Kuan-ying

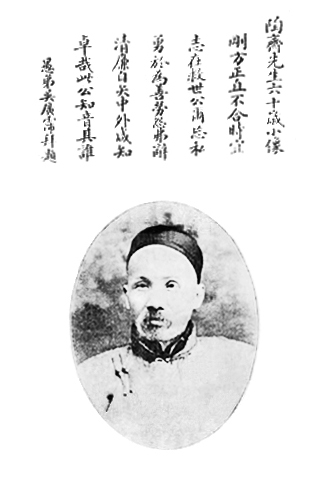
Zheng Guanying

Zheng Guanying or Cheng Kuan-ying (1842–1922 or '23) was a Chinese reformist active in the late Qing dynasty. He was a proponent of fighting economic dominance by Western countries of China through economic nationalism, of parliamentary representative democracy, and of women's rights.

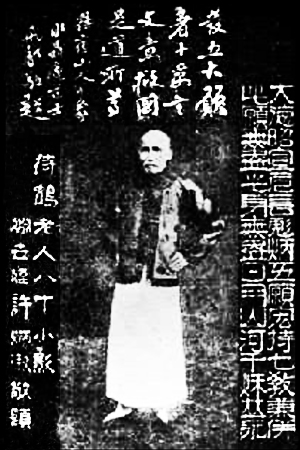
Zheng in the 1920s

== History ==
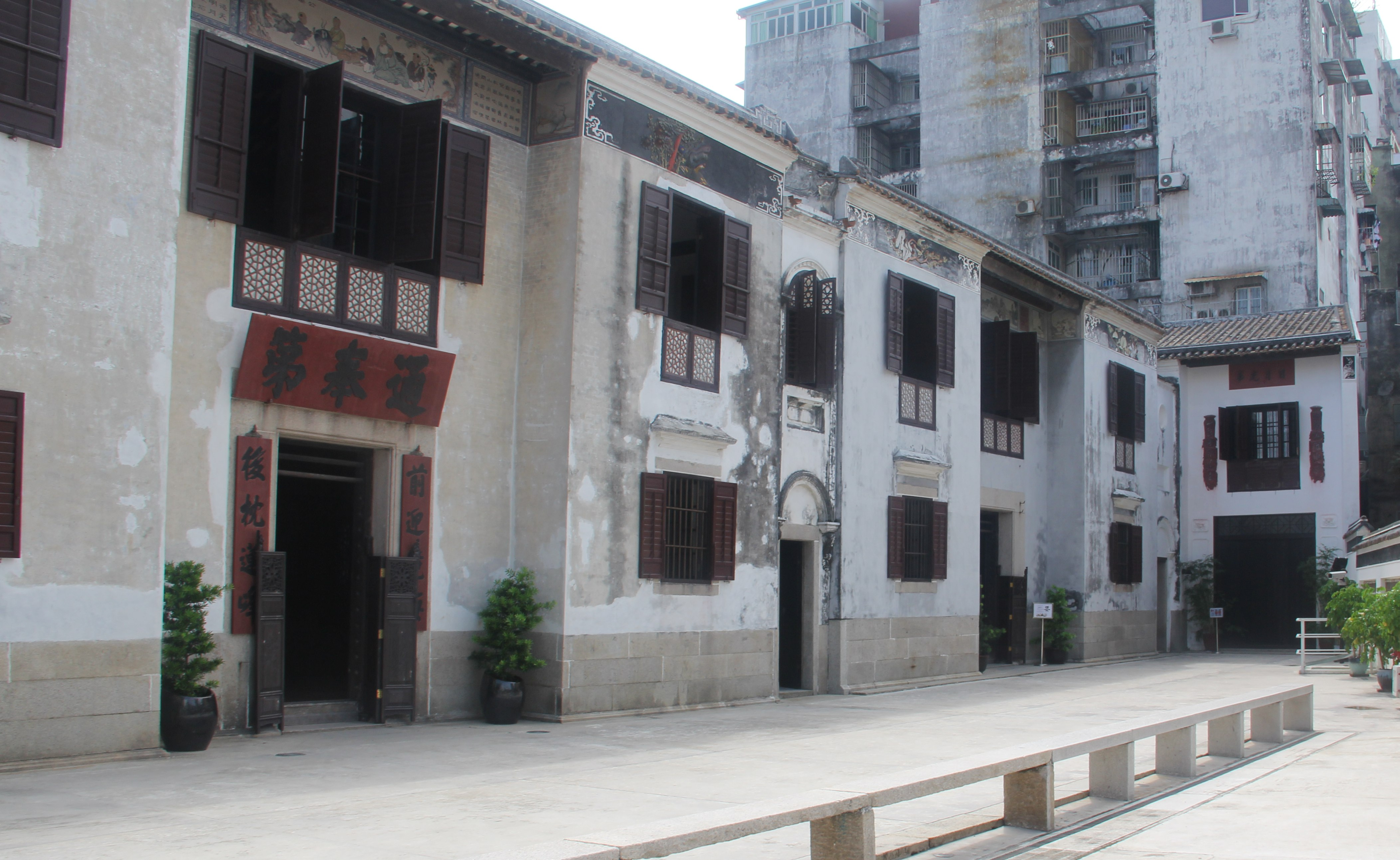
Mandarin's House

His family members resided in Macau, but his birthplace was Xiangshan, Guangdong; today this is the Yongmo area of Sanxiang, Zhongshan. He lived in the Mandarin's House in São Lourenço, Macau.

He made a career as a comprador after moving to Shanghai at 16 years of age; he previously took and failed the xiucai imperial examinations at that age; he ultimately never passed any such examinations. He first worked for Overweg and Company, a British firm, and later for Butterfield & Swire. Initially he used his funds to buy official titles. In 1879 he became a circuit intendant or daotai as an award for his community service, and he received other titles due to his service work. He took night classes on the English language at the Anglo-Chinese School. He began his own firm after turning 41. He went back to Macau in late 1886.

His employment background differed from those of other Chinese reformers of that era; others had academic or government backgrounds.

== Works ==
In the early 1870s he published essays about politics.

Words of Warning to a Prosperous Age (盛世危言 shèngshì wēiyán) was published in 1893.

Travels to the South, a travel log, was the result of his 1884 intelligence-gathering mission in French Indochina.

== Legacy and scholarship ==
Zheng's writings had an extraordinary influence, both in his own time and in later decades. Among those who acknowledge his inspiration were Mao Zedong, and Lu Xun.

As of 2011 most English-language journal articles discussing Zheng were published in the 1960s, and few English-language books on him existed. Beginning in the 1980s more articles about Zheng were published in Chinese.

Escola Oficial Zheng Guanying, a government school in Macau, was given its current name in 2011. The 160th anniversary of the birth of Zheng was held in Zhongshan in 2002.

== Sources ==
- Guo, Wu. Zheng Guanying, Merchant Reformer of Late Qing China and his Influence on Economics, Politics, and Society. Cambria Press. May 28, 2010. ISBN 9781604977059.
