= China Well-known Trademark =

The China Well-known Trademark (Chinese: 中国驰名商标) is a legal proprietary notion in China. It specifically denotes a trademark that is extensively recognized and familiar to the public in China.

== History ==
The third version by the State Administration for Industry and Commerce (SAIC), sanctioned by the State Council of the People's Republic of China, along with the Provisions on the Recognition and Protection of Well-Known Trademarks, designates the Trademark Office of the SAIC and the Trademark Review and Adjudication Board as the authorities responsible for the recognition and management of well-known trademarks.

Article 6 of the Interpretation on Several Issues Concerning the Application of Law to the Trial of Civil Disputes Involving Domain Names of Computer Networks (July 17, 2001), issued by the Supreme People's Court, permits the People's Court to ascertain the status of a registered trademark as well-known in the context of a domain name dispute trial, and it cannot be classified as a "Well-known Trademark" without license. Recognized trademarks are safeguarded by relevant laws and regulations, which can effectively prevent unauthorized usage by others.

The term "Well-known Trademark" originates from the Paris Convention for the Protection of Industrial Property, which mandates that member governments must provide enhanced protection for well-known trademarks compared to regular trademarks.

Per the Decision of the Standing Committee of the National People's Congress regarding the Amendment of the Trademark Law of the People's Republic of China (Presidential Decree No. 6) dated August 30, 2013, effective May 1, 2014, the revised provisions of the Trademark Law prohibit producers and operators from utilizing the terms "Well-known Trademark" on product packaging and containers to prevent unilateral promotion associated with the term.

Well-known marks in China are governed by regulations issued by the State Administration of Industry and Commerce. Unlike in most other jurisdictions, well-known trademark determinations in China can only be made when requested for specific cases, and during an adjudication the claimant must provide proof of use over five years. Requesters are liable for the authenticity of the documentation they submit, and the Trademark Office may hold violators liable for fraud.
